= Clee =

Clee may refer to

- Clee Hills, a range of hills in Shropshire, England
  - Brown Clee Hill, the highest point in the county of Shropshire, in the Clee Hills
  - Titterstone Clee Hill, a hill in the Clee Hills, Shropshire
- Clee Hill Junction, a railway junction in Shropshire
- Cleehill, a village in Shropshire
- Clee St Margaret, a village in Shropshire
- Old Clee, a village in Lincolnshire, England
- New Clee, a suburb of Grimsby, Lincolnshire
  - New Clee railway station, a railway station serving New Clee
- Clee Park, the original ground of Grimsby Town F. C. (1880 - 1889)

See Also Cleethorpes

People with the surname Clee

- Lester H. Clee (1888 - 1962), American clergyman
