= Nordy Bank (novel) =

1964 children's adventure novel by Sheena Porter

- Front cover of first edition
- Author: Sheena Porter
- Illustrator: Annette Macarthur-Onslow
- Language: English
- Genre: Children's adventure novel, supernatural fiction
- Publisher: Oxford University Press
- Publication date: 1964
- Publication place: United Kingdom
- Media type: Print (hardcover)
- Pages: 144 pp (first edition)
- ISBN: 0192770853 (New Oxford Library, 1979)
- OCLC: 688964
- LC Class: PZ7.P8338 No3

Nordy Bank is a children's adventure novel by Sheena Porter, published by Oxford in 1964 with illustrations by Annette Macarthur-Onslow. Set in the hills of Shropshire, it features children whose camping holiday seems to engage the prehistoric past. Porter won the annual Carnegie Medal for excellence in British children's literature.

Roy Publishers issued the first US edition in 1967, retaining the original illustrations.

== Plot summary ==
Six children plan a camping trip during the Easter holidays, deciding on Brown Clee Hill as it is out of the way of summer visitors. They set up camp on the top of the hill, which turns out to be the site of an Iron Age hillfort, Nordy Bank. Bronwen is particularly susceptible to the atmosphere of the place, and shows unexpected knowledge about its construction. Her personality begins to change, as from a quiet good-natured girl she becomes argumentative, then increasingly withdrawn and sullen. Bron is aware of the change and frightened by it. Her friend Margery believes she is possessed by the spirit of an Iron Age woman.

Meanwhile, an Alsatian dog of the Royal Army Veterinary Corps escapes while on his way to retraining by the National Canine Defence League after being retired due to partial deafness. Being muzzled, he is unable to hunt and becomes increasingly hungry. When the dog appears lurking round the camp, the dog-loving Bron reacts with fear and hostility, calling him a wolf. However, his forlorn state eventually rouses her true self and she befriends him.

== Characters ==
Campers

- Peter Furness, a 15-year-old boy, clever, a natural leader and inclined to be sarcastic
- Margery Furness, Peter's younger sister, kind-hearted and a peace-maker
- Robin Furness, their 10-year-old brother, keen on fossils
- Anne Turner, their cousin, visiting from Bristol, a good cook but scared of dogs and worms
- Bronwen Owen (Bron), Margery's friend, an only child, a shy but sensible girl, who loves animals
- Joe Catlin, Peter's friend, a 15-year-old farmer's son, very competent and an experienced camper

Adults

- Dr Furness, a busy GP
- Mrs Furness, who breeds Dalmatians
- Mr Owen, Bron's father, whose work forces his family to move frequently
- Mrs Owen, Bron's over-protective mother
- Mr Catlin, Joe's father, a farmer
- Arthur and Edward, farming brothers who give permission for the camp and supply the campers with milk and water
- Mrs Pritchard, shopkeeper and postmistress in the village of Clee St. Margaret, where the children buy supplies
- Corporal Smythe of the RAVC, the Alsatian's handler
- Mr Kirby of the National Canine Defence League

Animals

- Lucy, Margery's Dalmatian, who has puppies during the story
- Spotted Dick, the smallest of Lucy's litter
- Griff (as named by Bron), an Alsatian, a former army dog

== References to actual history and geography ==
The novel is set primarily in a precisely described location, Nordy Bank on Brown Clee Hill in Shropshire. The surrounding countryside, the Shropshire Hills, the village of Clee St. Margaret, and the market town of Ludlow also feature prominently. (As of 2007 Porter lives in Ludlow.)

The ancient hill fort at Nordy Bank was designed for defence against men or wolves. The novel describes the differences between Roman, Iron Age and Stone Age camps on the site.

== References to other works ==
Margery and Bron quote from A. E. Housman's poem "The Welsh Marches" while looking at the surrounding landscape. The novel echoes the theme of the poem, the long history of warfare in the region, the "war that sleeps" in the land itself.

For reading in camp, Bron takes Rosemary Sutcliff's novel Warrior Scarlet, about a boy in Bronze Age Britain whose test of manhood is the single-handed killing of a wolf. When the army dog first appears, she is reading aloud to the others a wolf attack on the boy's sheep.

== Literary significance ==
In The Nesbit Tradition, Marcus Crouch calls Nordy Bank Sheena Porter's finest book. He describes the camping scenes as beautifully done, conveying a sense of adventure and good companionship, but he regards the novel as primarily concerned with the development of personality. "In Nordy Bank Sheena Porter shows how self-discovery can go hand-in-hand with the discovery of society. It is an effective lesson, the more so because the lesson is contained in an absorbing and dramatic story and the inner and outer themes are inseparable."

Porter and Nordy Bank won the annual Carnegie Medal from the Library Association for 1964, recognising the year's best children's book by a British subject.

== See also ==
Awards
Preceded by Time of Trial	Carnegie Medal recipient 1964	Succeeded by The Grange at High Force
