= Coreley =

Village in Shropshire, England

Coordinates: 52.360°N 2.563°W

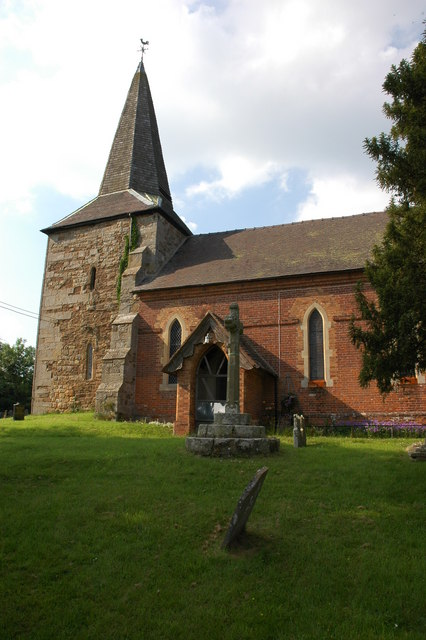
- St Peter's church, Coreley

- Location within Shropshire
- Population: 388 (2011)
- OS grid reference: SO616737
- Civil parish: Coreley
- Unitary authority: Shropshire
- Ceremonial county: Shropshire
- Region: West Midlands
- Country: England
- Sovereign state: United Kingdom
- Post town: LUDLOW
- Postcode district: SY8
- Dialling code: 01584
- Police: West Mercia
- Fire: Shropshire
- Ambulance: West Midlands
- UK Parliament: Ludlow

Coreley is a small, dispersed village and civil parish in south Shropshire, England, near to Clee Hill Village. It is situated approximately 30 miles (48 km) south west of Birmingham and just 4.5 miles (7.2 km) north east of Tenbury Wells. The name Corely comes from the Old English corn meaning a crane/heron and lēah meaning a forest/wood. This translates to crane wood/farmland.

CORELEY, a parish in Cleobury-Mortimer district, Salop; under the Clee Hills, 3½ miles NNE of Tenbury r[ailway]. station, and 5 WSW of Cleobury-Mortimer. Post town, Tenbury. Acres, 2,175. Rated property, £1,490. Pop[ulation]., 515. Houses, 106. The property is divided among a few. The living is a rectory in the diocese of Hereford. Value, £280.* Patron, Rev. J. Burnett Stuart. The church is of brick, and ancient, with tower and spire; and was reported in 1859 as bad.

— John Marius Wilson, Imperial Gazetteer of England and Wales

== History ==
Coreley is a very rural parish and historically industry in Coreley has been dominated by agriculture. In 1831 the occupation of men living in Coreley was largely dominated by farmers and agricultural labourers. In 1881 industry in Coreley was also engaged in mining which attracted the majority of working males whilst others continued with agricultural practices. This contrasts with the more recent 2001 census which states that only 8% of both men and women were working in the agricultural field and mining was no longer represented due to the mining industry being closed down in 1984. The most popular career paths for the population of Coreley, according to 2001 census are: Construction; Health and Social Work and Real Estate.

Listed buildings include Brook Row Cottage, Colliers Arms Public House and Hints Farm, all Grade II.

== Transport ==
=== Bus Service ===
The village is near the A4117, along which travels the 292 Kidderminster to Ludlow bus.

=== Rail Links ===
The closest station to Coreley is in Ludlow which offers a regular train service to Manchester, Cardiff or to Birmingham via Hereford

== See also ==
- Listed buildings in Coreley
