= Bedlam, Shropshire =

Hamlet in Shropshire, England

Coordinates: 52°23′33″N 2°36′44″W

Bedlam (also known as Titterstone Village) is a small hamlet in south Shropshire, England.

It is located east of Bitterley and north of Cleehill, situated on the slopes of Titterstone Clee Hill. The village, along with Dhustone, was built to house workers in the dhustone quarries on the hill.

The village has a war memorial in the form of a short stone Celtic cross standing on a large base next to a now-closed chapel.
