= Titterstone Clee Hill =

Hill in Shropshire, England

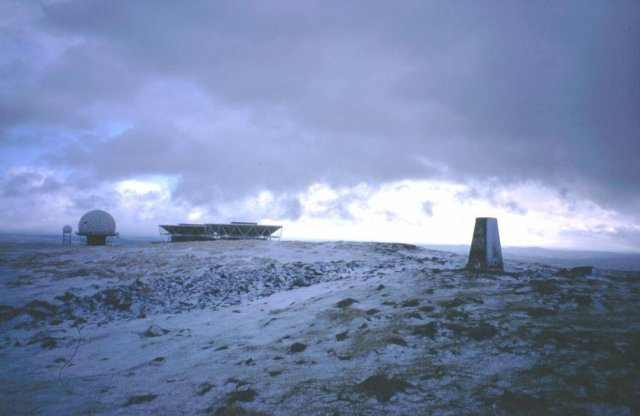
- The summit under snow, with the radar station beyond

Highest point
- Elevation: 533 m (1,749 ft)
- Prominence: 232 m (761 ft)
- Parent peak: Brown Clee Hill
- Listing: Marilyn
- Coordinates: 52°23′51″N 2°36′09″W

Geography
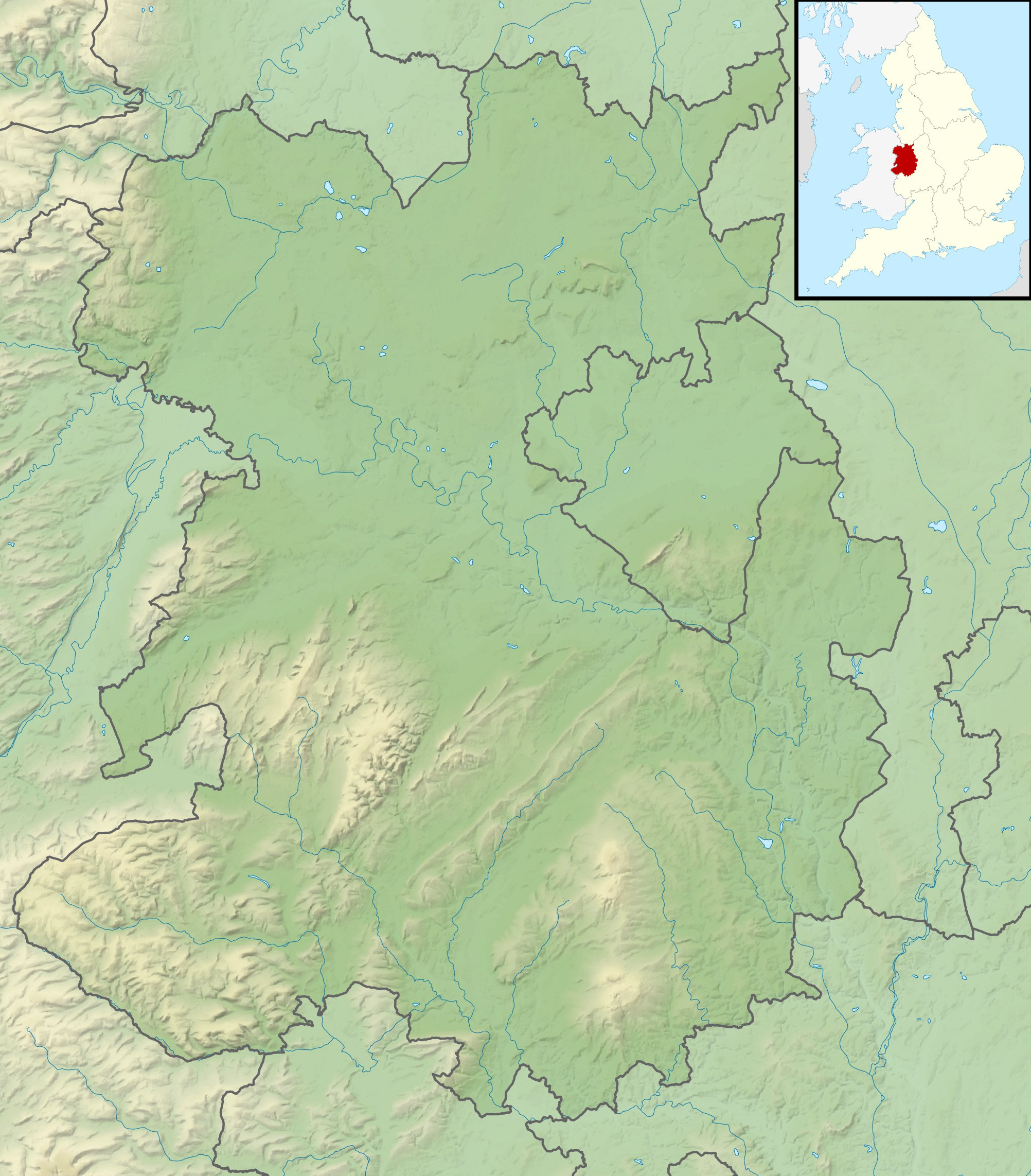
- Location within Shropshire
- Location: Shropshire, England
- Parent range: Clee Hills, Shropshire Hills
- OS grid: SO591779
- Topo map: OS Landranger 137, 138

Climbing
- Easiest route: Road and footpath from Cleehill village

Titterstone Clee Hill, sometimes referred to as Titterstone Clee or simply Clee Hill, is a prominent hill in the county of Shropshire, England. It rises to 533 metres (1,749 ft) above sea level at the summit, making it the third-highest hill in the county after Brown Clee Hill and Stiperstones.

The hill forms part of the Clee Hills, which lie within the Shropshire Hills National Landscape (formerly known as 'Area of Outstanding Natural Beauty'). The nearest town is Ludlow, visible from parts of Cleehill village on the slopes of the hill. On clear days, long-distance views are possible towards the Malvern Hills, the Brecon Beacons, the Shropshire Plain and, in the distance, the Welsh mountains.

A 20th-century triangulation pillar stands at the summit, close to the remains of ancient cairns and modern radar domes used for air traffic control and weather monitoring.

== Geography ==
Titterstone Clee is the third-highest hill in Shropshire, exceeded only by nearby Brown Clee Hill (540 metres (1,770 ft)) and the Stiperstones (536 metres (1,759 ft)). The upper part of the hill is mainly common land, used for the grazing of sheep, for air traffic control installations, and for both active and disused quarries. The summit is open and treeless, shaped by decades of quarrying, with a number of industrial remains still present.

The summit has been heavily altered by human activity. It was first disturbed by the construction of Bronze Age cairns and an Iron Age hill fort, and later by mining for coal and the quarrying of dolerite, known locally as dhustone. The stone was originally worked into setts for road paving and dock construction, notably at the new docks in Newport, South Wales, and later used as aggregate for concrete and modern road surfaces. Many abandoned quarry buildings are regarded as being of industrial archaeological interest, including some of the earliest known uses of reinforced concrete in Britain.

=== Settlements ===
The village of Cleehill lies on the A4117 road as it crosses the hill. At 1,200 feet (370 m) above sea level, it is home to the highest pub in Shropshire, known as The Cross on the Hill, as well as the county's highest primary school.

On the north-eastern slope of the hill lies the small village of Cleeton St Mary, a scattered settlement with a church and a number of historic houses. Both Cleehill and Cleeton St Mary developed with the growth of quarrying and continue to serve as local communities for people living on and around the hill.

== Geology ==
Titterstone Clee rises above the surrounding countryside because of its distinctive geology. The hill is capped by resistant igneous rock and surrounding zones of contact metamorphism, which have withstood erosion more effectively than the underlying sedimentary rocks. Most of the lower ground consists of mudstones and sandstones of Devonian age, collectively known as the Old Red Sandstone. The upper part of this succession is the St Maughans Formation, which on the northern and western flanks rises close to the summit. Here it is overlain by a thick dolerite sill and a band of tough hornfels formed by contact metamorphism. A similar but larger intrusion caps Brown Clee Hill to the south.

The Old Red Sandstone is unconformably overlain by Carboniferous Limestone, represented locally by the Oreton Limestone Formation and the Lower Limestone Shale Group. These rocks crop out in a curved belt to the south of Cleehill village and to the north around Farlow. Above them lies the Cornbrook Sandstone Formation, the local equivalent of the Millstone Grit, which occurs between Cleehill village and Knowle, and also to the northeast of the hill. This is overlain by mudstones, siltstones and sandstones of the Lower and Middle Coal Measures, which cover much of the surface of the hill. The sequence extends southwest to Knowbury and northeast beneath Catherton Common. It contains seatearths and coal seams that were once worked commercially, the most widespread being the 'Gutter Coal', lying just above the basal sandstone of the Coal Measures.

The dark dolerite sill is known locally as Dhustone (probably derived from the Welsh du, meaning 'black'). It is an olivine basalt, intruded as a sill between sandstone layers within the Middle Westphalian sediments. The intrusion distorted the weaker surrounding rocks, which were still relatively unconsolidated at the time.

An extensive fault system runs east-north-east to west-south-west across the southern slopes of the hill. The northerly downthrowing Leinthall Earls Fault continues to the west-south-west, while the Titterstone Clee Fault extends to the east-north-east. Other smaller faults, some at right angles to these main structures, affect both the sedimentary strata and the intruded sills.

Near the summit is the Giant's Chair, a pile of periglacial boulders formed during cold phases of the Devensian glaciation.

== History, quarrying and land usage ==
Near the summit trig point are the remains of a Bronze Age cairn, dating back about 4,000 years. This suggests the summit was once used as a ceremonial site. Although quarrying has partly damaged it, the Iron Age hill fort on Titterstone Clee, surrounded by large earthworks, has survived better than the fort on Brown Clee. The fort walls are unusual as they are built from stone blocks rather than earth banks.

Clee Hill is one of the few hills or mountains marked on the Hereford Mappa Mundi, a 13th-century map of the world kept at Hereford Cathedral.

During the medieval period, ironstone was mined, and later coal was worked, often by means of bell pits—small mine shafts, one of which has since filled with water to form a lake. Over time, many quarries were opened on Titterstone Clee to extract dolerite. All but one quarry, on Clee Hill, are now closed. The largest have cliffs dropping up to 100 feet (30 m).

Before the Second World War, the area was considered industrial because of the scale of quarrying and related work. Men travelled from towns such as Bridgnorth and Ludlow to work in the quarries. The villages of Bedlam and Dhustone were built specifically to house quarry workers. Today, remains of quarry buildings lie scattered across the hill, reminders of an industry that once employed more than 2,000 people. A disused 3 ft (914 mm) narrow gauge railway incline can still be seen, along with a large concrete structure where wagons were loaded with stone, next to the current car park. On the slopes above Cleehill village, a standard gauge incline once carried stone away by rail; it remained in use until the early 1960s. On a smaller scale, the quarries have also been worked for coal, fireclay and limestone.

In the early 20th century, a further large quarry, the Magpie Quarry, was opened on the eastern side of Clee Hill. An aerial ropeway was built to carry stone down to the railway at Detton Ford. The concrete bases for the pylons that once supported the ropeway can still be seen near the summit, close to the modern track leading to the radar domes.

The nearby settlement cleehill, continues to be a host for quarrying with company Midland Quarry Products operating there

== Radar domes ==
During the Second World War, a radar station was established on Titterstone Clee in September 1941 as part of the air defence of the United Kingdom. Operating under the cover name RAF Clee Hill, it housed between 40 and 50 personnel. At first, the radar and wireless staff lived in huts on the site, which made for cold conditions in winter. In September 1956 the station ceased to be residential, and personnel were instead billeted in Ludlow. The unit, latterly commanded by a Flight Lieutenant, was disbanded and closed in September 1957. It was later reactivated in 1964 under the control of the Civil Aviation Authority.

Now used by the Civil Aviation Authority for civil radar operations, several radar domes and towers remain in operation on the summit. The largest array is part of the National Air Traffic Services (NATS) network, one of around 30 overlapping radars that together monitor UK airspace. The installation at Titterstone Clee tracks aircraft within a radius of about 100 miles (160 km). A smaller dome is operated by the Met Office as part of a nationwide network of 16 weather radars used to detect rainfall and cloud systems. The domes and towers are well-known local landmarks, and one of the larger radomes is popularly nicknamed "the golf ball".

== Modern-day quarrying ==
Quarrying continues on Clee Hill, to the rear of Cleehill village. Operations resumed in the late 1980s, around 50 years after the closure of the Titterstone Clee Dhustone quarry near the summit. The current quarry extracts dolerite for use in road construction and aggregate.

The site is currently operated by Midland Quarry Products.

From the A4117 road, the main quarry buildings are faintly visible, though careful landscaping and screening largely conceal the industrial site from public view. The quarry remains an important local employer and continues the long history of stone extraction on Titterstone Clee that dates back to the 19th century.

== Access and recreation ==
The summit area and unenclosed upper slopes of Titterstone Clee, along with Clee Hill to its south, were mapped as 'open country' under the provisions of the Countryside and Rights of Way Act 2000 and are freely available to walkers.

There is also a dense network of footpaths and bridleways across both the unenclosed land and the surrounding farmland. Some connect from the A4117 — which runs east–west across Clee Hill Common's southern flanks and reaches a height of 1,250 feet (380 m) above sea level — while a minor public road provides access to the upper parts of the hill and nearby parking areas.

Titterstone Clee is popular with walkers and picnickers, though less so than nearby hills such as the Long Mynd. From the summit, the Shropshire Way runs north to Brown Clee Hill, southwest to Ludlow and east to Cleobury Mortimer. Another long-distance trail, the Jack Mytton Way, runs along the northeastern margin of the hill.

== In popular culture ==
- Titterstone Clee features prominently in the historical mystery novel The Virgin in the Ice by Ellis Peters, part of the Cadfael series. The hill and surrounding landscape provide a key setting for the novel's events.
- The hill is depicted as a location in the 2020 video game Assassin's Creed Valhalla, set in 9th-century England. Players can explore the area as part of the Sciropescire region in the game.

== See also ==
- Clee Hill Junction – near Bitterley, the location of the railway junction and transfer sidings connecting the inclines to the main railway network
