= Listed buildings in Coreley =

Coreley is a civil parish in Shropshire, England. It contains 13 listed buildings that are recorded in the National Heritage List for England. Of these, one is listed at Grade II*, the middle of the three grades, and the others are at Grade II, the lowest grade. The parish contains the village of Coreley and the surrounding countryside. The listed buildings consist of a church and items in the churchyard, a farmhouse, a cottage, a public house, two mileposts, a drinking fountain and a milestone.

== Key ==
Grade	Criteria
II*	Particularly important buildings of more than special interest
II	Buildings of national importance and special interest

== Buildings ==
Name and location	Photograph	Date	Notes	Grade
St Peter's Church; 52.36260°N 2.56947°W		13th century	The nave and chancel were rebuilt in 1757, and there were further alterations in the 19th century. The tower is in sandstone, the body of the church is in brick on a sandstone plinth, and the roofs are tiled. The church consists of a nave with a south porch, a chancel, and a west tower. The tower has quoins, and is surmounted by a wooden shingled broach spire. The windows are lancets, and the east window has three lights.	II*
Hints Farmhouse; 52.37211°N 2.57079°W	—	16th century	A farmhouse, later a private house, it is partly timber framed with rendered infill, partly in stone, and partly in brick, and has a tile roof. There is one storey and an attic, and the building originated as a longhouse with three domestic bays and two agricultural bays. The windows are casements, there are two gabled dormers, and the doorway has a plain oak frame.	II
Brook Row Cottage; 52.36600°N 2.57939°W	—	17th century	A timber framed house with brick infill, rendered, and with a tile roof. There are two storeys, two bays, lean-to extensions at the sides, and a rear extension. The doorway has a moulded frame, and the windows are casements.	II
Colliers Arms Public House; 52.37617°N 2.57201°W		17th century	A farmhouse, later a public house, it is timber framed with rendered infill on a stone ground floor, the gable ends are in stone, partly rendered, and the roof is tiled. There are two storeys and an attic, three bays, and later extensions. The doorway has a gabled canopy, the windows are casements, and there is a flat-roofed dormer.	II
Group of two headstones 52.36260°N 2.56926°W	—	Early 18th century	The headstones are in the churchyard of St Peter's Church, and are to the memory of two former rectors of the parish and members of their family. They are in sandstone, one is carved with skull and crossbones, and the other has a festoon ornament.	II
Starie memorial 52.36248°N 2.56925°W	—	18th century	The memorial is in the churchyard of St Peter's Church, and is to the memory of John Starie and his wife. It is a sandstone headstone with carving on both sides. On the front is an inscribed cartouche with raised foliage ornament, surmounted by cherubs.	II
Milestone at NGR SO 6123 7598; 52.38044°N 2.57082°W		Late 18th century	The milestone is on the south side of the A4117 road, and is in sandstone. It has a rectangular section and a rounded top. The destination plate is missing, and there is a benchmark on the head.	II
Milepost at NGR SO 5979 7550; 52.36248°N 2.56925°W		Early 19th century	The milepost is on the north side of the A4117 road, and is in cast iron with a triangular section and a sloping top plate. The top is inscribed with "CLEE HILL", and on the sides are the distances in miles to Ludlow and to Cleobury Mortimer.	II
Milepost at NGR SO 6123 7598; 52.38054°N 2.57093°W		Early 19th century	The milepost is on the north side of the A4117 road, and is in cast iron with a triangular section and a sloping top plate. The top is inscribed with "DODDINGTON", and on the sides are the distances in miles to Ludlow and to Cleobury Mortimer.	II
Pugh memorial 52.36265°N 2.56925°W	—	Early 19th century	The memorial is in the churchyard of St Peter's Church, and is to the memory of two members of the Pugh family. It is a chest tomb in sandstone, and has a plain plinth, recessed panels, vertically incised corner piers with scalloped bands, and a flat slab lid.	II
Unidentified chest tomb 52.36256°N 2.56940°W	—	Early to mid 19th century	The chest tomb is in the churchyard of St Peter's Church. It is in sandstone, and has a plain plinth, recessed panels, vertically beaded and recessed panelled corner piers, and a shallow pediment lid with a fluted infill. The inscriptions are illegible.	II
Lowe memorial 52.36255°N 2.56928°W	—	Mid 19th century	The memorial is in the churchyard of St Peter's Church, and is to the memory of two members of the Lowe family. It is a chest tomb in sandstone, and has a plain plinth, recessed panels, fluted and beaded corner sections, and a shallow pedimented lid with fluted infill.	II
Pillar fountain 52.37406°N 2.57225°W	—	Late 19th century	The drinking fountain is in cast iron and has a cylindrical plan. It consists of a fluted column with a roll moulded base and collar. At the top is a fluted domed cover, with a bud finial and a handle mount on the right. On the front is a protruding lion mask spout, under which is a small inscribed plaque.	II
