= Listed buildings in Caynham =

Caynham is a civil parish in Shropshire, England. It contains 17 listed buildings that are recorded in the National Heritage List for England. Of these, two are listed at Grade II*, the middle of the three grades, and the others are at Grade II, the lowest grade. The parish contains the small villages of Caynham and Knowbury, and is otherwise rural. The listed buildings consist of two churches and items in the churchyards, houses, a bridge, a milestone, and a school.

== Key ==
Grade	Criteria
II*	Particularly important buildings of more than special interest
II	Buildings of national importance and special interest

== Buildings ==
Name and location	Photograph	Date	Notes	Grade
St Mary's Church; 52.35572°N 2.65668°W		12th century	The oldest part of the church is the tower, and the body of the church was largely rebuilt in 1884–85. The church is built in stone, and has tiled roofs with ornamental cresting. It consists of a nave, a north aisle, a south porch, a chancel with a north vestry, and a west tower. The tower is in Early English style, with lancet windows, with two stages and a pyramidal roof. The east window is in Decorated style, and in the nave is a reset Norman window.	II*
Churchyard Cross; 52.35562°N 2.65650°W		14th century (probable)	The cross is in the churchyard of St Mary's Church. It is in ashlar stone, and consists of a tapering shaft about 2.4 metres (7 ft 10 in) high on a stone base on three stone steps. On the shaft is vestigial crocket decoration, and on the base are carved panels.	II*
Upper North Cottage; 52.35343°N 2.65273°W	—	Late 17th century	A timber framed house with brick infill on a brick plinth, with a tiled roof and ornamental ridge tiles. There is a single storey with attics, and two bays with extensions at each end. The windows are casements, and there are gabled dormers.	II
North Cottage; 52.35296°N 2.65412°W	—	18th century	A house that was extended in the 19th century, altered in the 20th century, and divided into two dwellings. The original part is timber framed and rendered, the later parts are in brick, and the roof is slated. There is a single storey and attics, a two-bay range, and a cross-wing with extensions. The windows are casements, and there are dormers.	II
Caynham Court; 52.35371°N 2.66683°W	—	18th century	A country house that was considerably expanded in 1852–55. It is in red brick, partly rendered, with a string course, a dentil cornice, a parapet, and a hipped slate roof. On the roof is a glazed flat-roof belvedere. The main block has three storeys, a front with a central range of three bays flanked by projecting wings. In the centre is a portico with Tuscan columns and a Doric entablature. There are canted bay windows, sash windows, and a French window. To the left is a single-storey wing with a doorway, there are two-storey extensions on the left, and further extensions at the rear and on the right.	II
Caynham House; 52.34767°N 2.68355°W	—	18th century	A rear wing was added in the early 19th century. The house has a stone front, with brick at the sides and rear, and is stuccoed, with a hipped slate roof. The main part has three storeys and four bays. On the front is a portico with Tuscan columns and pilasters and an entablature. The windows are sashes in the lower two floors and casements in the top floor. The rear wing has two storeys and two bays, and contains sash windows with segmental heads.	II
Milestone; 52.37795°N 2.61380°W	—	Late 18th century	The milestone is on the north side of the A4117 road. It is in sandstone and has a rectangular section with a rounded head.	II
Sunnybrae; 52.37575°N 2.60696°W	—	Late 18th or early 19th century	A small cottage that was extended in the 19th century, it is in local basalt stone and has a tile roof. There are 1½ storeys, two bays, and a single-storey outshut. It has a brick porch, and the windows are casements.	II
Caynham New Bridge; 52.35256°N 2.67294°W	—	1824	The bridge carries a road over the Ledwyche Brook. It is in stone, it consists of a single segmental arch, and has swept approach walls with terminal piers. The bridge contains voussoirs, spandrels, a string course, and a coped parapet.	II
Group of three chest tombs 52.35578°N 2.65640°W	—	Early 19th century	The chest tombs are in the churchyard of St Mary's Church, and are in ashlar stone. They are of different designs, and are to the memory of people who died between 1816 and 1840.	II
Old Vicarage, wall and gatepiers 52.37304°N 2.63032°W	—	Early 19th century	The vicarage, later a private house, is in roughcast stone with quoins, and a hipped and gabled slate roof. It has a square plan, two storeys and three bays, and there is a service wing at the rear with one storey and attics. The central doorway has pilasters, a round-headed fanlight, and an open pedimented canopy. The windows are sashes with keyed lintels. Attached to the house are stone walls, and gate piers with pyramidal caps.	II
National School; 52.35384°N 2.66275°W	—	1834	The school is in stone with a slate roof, a single storey, and three bays. The gables have bargeboards with pierced fleur-de-lis decoration. On the roof is a bell turret with a pyramidal roof and a finial. The doorway has a chamfered surround, an arched head, and a stepped hood mould. The windows are mullioned and transomed, with keyed lintels and stepped hood moulds.	II
Methodist Chapel; 52.35801°N 2.65125°W		c. 1836	The chapel is in red brick with a slate roof, one storey and one room. In the front facing the road are two windows with pointed arches, in the left gable end is a segmental-arched doorway and a window with a pointed arch above. To the north is a lean-to extension.	II
St Paul's Church, Knowbury; 52.37346°N 2.63005°W		1838–39	The chancel, stair turret, and porch were added in 1883–84 when other alterations were made. The church is built in stone, the early part has a slate roof, and the roof of the later parts is tiled. It consists of a nave, a south porch, a higher chancel with a north organ chamber, and a west tower with a north vestry. The tower has three stages, a west doorway with a pointed arch, and an embattled parapet. The windows are in Decorated style.	II
Willow Cottage; 52.35402°N 2.66231°W		1870	A pair of mirror-image estate cottages in stone with some brick, and tiled roofs with red and blue crested ridge tiles. There are two storeys, and on the front are two gables. The ground floor windows are mullioned and transomed, and in the upper floor they are mullioned. On the sides are gables with porches in the angles that have shaped bargeboards.	II
Knowbury War Memorial; 52.37335°N 2.63017°W		c. 1920	The war memorial is in the churchyard of St Paul's Church to the west of the church. It is in grey granite, and consists of an obelisk on a stepped plinth. The obelisk has two stages separated by a chamfered band. In the upper part is an inscription, and in the lower part are the names of those lost in the First World War. On the plinth is another inscription, and the names of those lost in the Second World War are on a separate granite plaque.	II
Lychgate; 52.35507°N 2.65696°W	—	Early 20th century	The lychgate is at the entrance to the churchyard of St Mary's Church. It has an oak frame on a stone plinth and a tile roof. There is a pair of timber gates, and an inscribed plaque on the southwest truss to the memory of those lost in the First World War.	II
