= Caynham =

Village and civil parish in Shropshire, England

Coordinates: 52.354°N 2.66°W

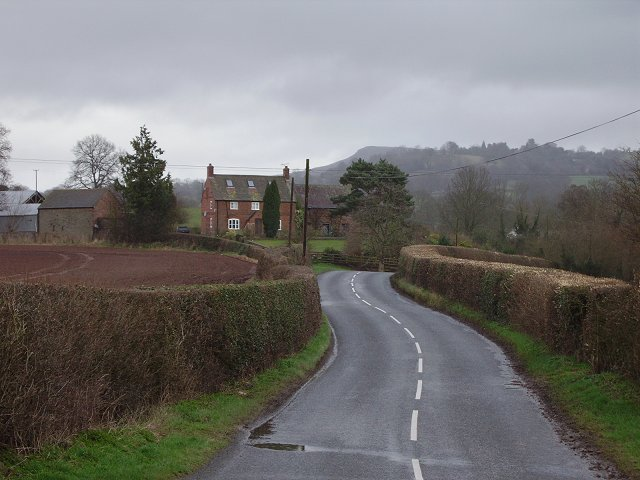
- Caynham

- Location within Shropshire
- Population: 1,489 (2011)
- OS grid reference: SO550731
- Civil parish: Caynham
- Unitary authority: Shropshire
- Ceremonial county: Shropshire
- Region: West Midlands
- Country: England
- Sovereign state: United Kingdom
- Post town: LUDLOW
- Postcode district: SY8
- Dialling code: 01584
- Police: West Mercia
- Fire: Shropshire
- Ambulance: West Midlands
- UK Parliament: Ludlow

Caynham is a village and civil parish in south Shropshire, England. The parish lies on the River Teme. It can be accessed via the A4117 or the A49 roads and is located 2 1/2 miles (4 km) southeast of the market town of Ludlow. The civil parish includes the village of Cleehill and has an area of 953 hectares (2,350 acres).

== History ==
The word "Caynham" is an Old English derivation of "Caega's Ham" or homestead of a person called Caega. It is believed the Saxons arrived in the area around 550–600 AD. Caynham (often written as Cainham in historic texts) is also mentioned in the Domesday Book (1086):

"Taxable value 8 geld units.Value: Value to lord in 1066 £8. Value to lord in 1086 £3.9. Value to lord c. 1070 £3.Households: 14 villagers. 9 smallholders. 9 slaves.Ploughland: 19 ploughlands (land for). 4 lord's plough teams. 5 men's plough teams.Other resources: 4.0 lord's lands.Woodland 200 pigs. 1 mill. 1 salthouse.Lord in 1066: Earl Morcar.Lords in 1086: Ralph of Mortimer; Robert of Vessey; Walter.Tenant-in-chief in 1086: Ralph of Mortimer.Phillimore reference: 4,11,4"

=== Early history of Caynham ===
400 million years ago, when life on earth was only 150–200 million years old, life was only under water. Caynham was situated in warm coral waters and was likely to have been bristling with sea-life, shells can still be found today in the stones around the foothills of Shropshire. Dead sea life fossilised over time to create limestone. This limestone was extensively quarried from the 18th century onwards.

First evidence of human settlement in the area is the massive earthwork of "Caynham Camp". It can be dated back to 900 BC, late in the Bronze Age. It was later developed and expanded until the Roman invasion of 44 AD.

Much of Caynham's later history lies with the manor of Caynham. It is believed that the village of Caynham today is far less important than the manor was in Norman times. There have been many owners of the manor, from Saxon and Norman times with the Earl of Mercia, and Ralph de Mortimer who wrote the extract within the Domesday book for Caynham, to the Curtis dynasty of 1852–1946. In addition the manor of Caynham passed through many different hands in years to follow, until only recently in 2003 the court was bought by Paul Chester and work continues to substantially refurbish and restore the Manor.

=== Bishop Hooper C of E School ===
Bishop Hooper is Caynham's local primary school. Long serving the village and surrounding areas, dating back to the early 19th century in 1834. Aided by Shropshire Local Education Authority, the school is prestigious for its upkeep, and won an award for Environmental friendliness. In 2011 the school moved out of Caynham, to a new site in nearby Ashford Carbonell.

== Landmarks ==
=== St. Mary's Church ===
As a parish Caynham possesses a small parish church. St. Mary's Church is a small but quaint church, used mostly by local settlers and dates back to 1179, during the reign of King Henry II. The churchyard contains one Commonwealth war burial of the First World War, Captain Sir William Michael Curtis, 4th Baronet, of the Royal Defence Corps, who lived at Caynham Court. The lych gate was dedicated to the nine local men who died serving in the same war, whose names are also listed on a brass plaque within the church in addition to a roll of honour of those who served.

=== Village hall ===
Caynham Village Hall was opened in 1911 in loving memory of George B. Charleton Esq. A new window was also placed in St. Mary's Church in memory of him. The hall is now used by youth clubs, the Mothers' Union and the local school for nativity performances etc. Moreover, it is also used for village socials suggesting a very close-knit, rural community. The Village Hall Committee manage and maintain the Hall.

== Industry ==
Industry in Caynham has changed significantly over time. As with many rural villages Caynham was once dominated by agriculture. This sector was highly dominated by one gender, with 90% of workers being male. Also in 1881, services and offices started to become large sectors of employment, dominated more by female workers at around 80%. Today, Caynham is largely used for commuters who travel to and from work in the cities or towns of the surrounding area.

== Geography ==
The village of Caynham is located along Caynham Road which also runs through the village of Knowbury. The road can be reached from the west by the A49 (north of Ashford Bowdler) or from the east from the A4117 near Clee Hill Village. There is also the minor road to Ludlow and the A49 there, via the Sheet.

The village lies on fairly high ground surrounded by rural foothills. Ledwyche Brook runs through the village.

Shrewsbury lies 32 miles to the north and can be accessed via the A49. Hereford is 24 miles south of Caynham and can also be accessed via the A49. The large town of Kidderminster is 22 miles east of Caynham, whilst the small local town of Ludlow lies 2.4 miles northwest.

== Demography ==
The population of the civil parish of Caynham in the 1961 census was 1,063. This increased to 1,489 in the 2011 census. However, the civil parish covers a much wider area than the actual village of Caynham.

== See also ==
- Listed buildings in Caynham
