= Klee (disambiguation) =

Paul Klee (1879–1940) was a German-Swiss painter.

Klee or KLEE may also refer to:

- KLEE, an American radio station
- Klee (band), a German pop band
- Klee (film), a 2025 Canadian short horror film directed by Gavin Baird
- Klee (surname), a surname (including a list of people with the surname)
- Klee Passage, a channel of water in the Marshall Islands
- KLEE-TV, a Houston TV channel now KPRC-TV
- 10543 Klee (1992 DL4), a main-belt asteroid
- Leesburg International Airport (ICAO code:KLEE)
- Klee, a character in 2020 video game Genshin Impact

== See also ==
- Clee (disambiguation)
