= Knowbury =

Village in Shropshire, England

Coordinates: 52.368°N 2.626°W

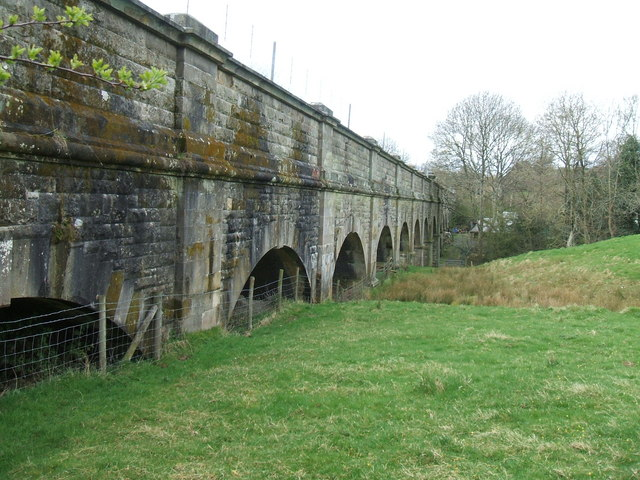
- The Bennett's End Aqueduct

- Location within Shropshire
- OS grid reference: SO573746
- Civil parish: Caynham
- Unitary authority: Shropshire
- Ceremonial county: Shropshire
- Region: West Midlands
- Country: England
- Sovereign state: United Kingdom
- Post town: LUDLOW
- Postcode district: SY8
- Dialling code: 01584
- Police: West Mercia
- Fire: Shropshire
- Ambulance: West Midlands
- UK Parliament: Ludlow

Knowbury is a small village near Ludlow in Shropshire, England. It is located in the civil parish of Caynham.

It is near to Clee Hill Village and had a part-time Post Office - now closed.

There were two adjacent public houses in the village, on Hope Bagot Lane - the Penny Black, and the Bennett's End. The Bennett's End continues to be a pub, though the Penny Black is now closed.

The Elan aqueduct passes through the area and crosses the Colly Brook valley (including Cumberley Lane) on the impressive Bennett's End Aqueduct.

== St Paul's Church, Knowbury ==
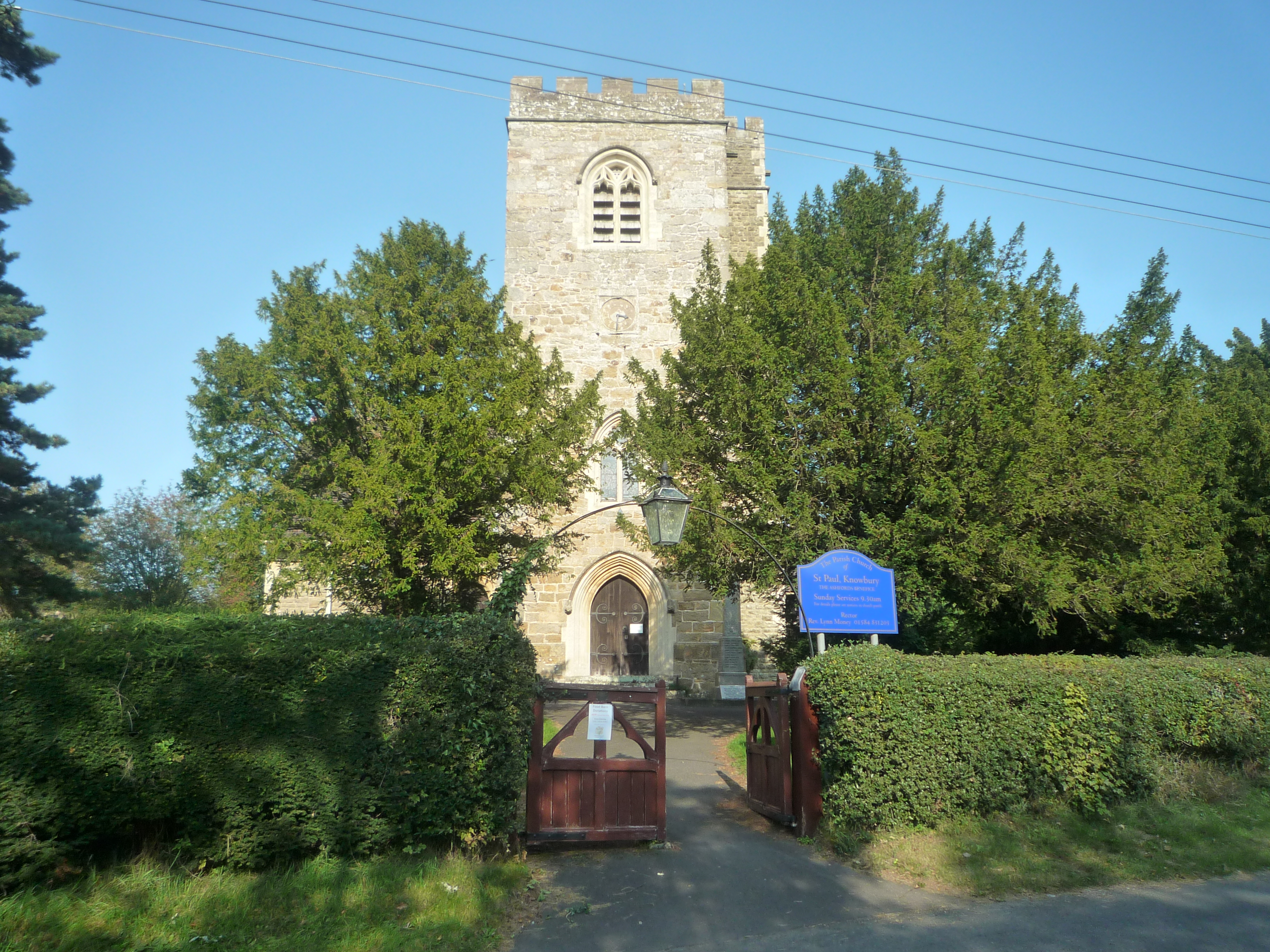
St. Paul's Church, Knowbury

The first church was a simple structure with a square tower, erected in 1839 for £1,200, on land donated by the Hon. Robert Clive, who also donated the stone and wood for building the church and vicarage. The builder was John Grosvenor of Ludlow. Next to the church was a school for 100 pupils. At the time the population was employed in collieries and brick works. The church was consecrated on 29 January 1840 by the Bishop of Hereford, Thomas Musgrave. The church "stands on the hill side, and is a conspicuous object from all parts of the surrounding country."

It was closed for essential work in 1874, and re-opened in 1881.

There were alterations and additions made in 1883/4 when the chancel, stair turret, and porch were added by Edward Turner of Leicester. The church is built in stone, the early part has a slate roof, and the roof of the later parts is tiled. It consists of a nave, a south porch, a higher chancel with a north organ chamber, and a west tower with a north vestry. The tower has three stages, a west doorway with a pointed arch, and an embattled parapet. The windows are in Decorated style.

Further donations were made, with the addition of a processional cross, altar cross, candlesticks, communion table, books, seats and silver communion plate. The organ is by H Wedlake of London and cost £191 in 1884. An old font was donated by Sir John Dashwood King, who also donated the tower clock. The clock mechanism is by J B Joyce & Co of Whitchurch. The stained glass in the east window is by Mayer of Munich; it shows the Crucifixion. The window in the south chancel showing the Eucharist and the glass in the tower, showing the Baptism of Christ and Suffer Little Children, are probably also by Mayer. The painted reredos, a wooden triptych, is by Charles Edgar Buckeridge; it shows Christ in Majesty, painted in the Netherlandish style. The rood was erected in the memory of Revd. F M Williams in 1911. The floodlighting for the tower was installed in 1977 to commemorate David Coles.

In 2019 a public meeting resolved to keep the church open, but with fewer services and more community functions.

The church is grade II listed. The churchyard contains the graves of 4 war dead, two British Army soldiers and an airman of World War I and an airman of World War II. Outside the church is the grade II listed War Memorial in form of a granite obelisk.

== See also ==
- Listed buildings in Caynham
