= Annette Macarthur-Onslow =

Australian author and illustrator (1933–2026)

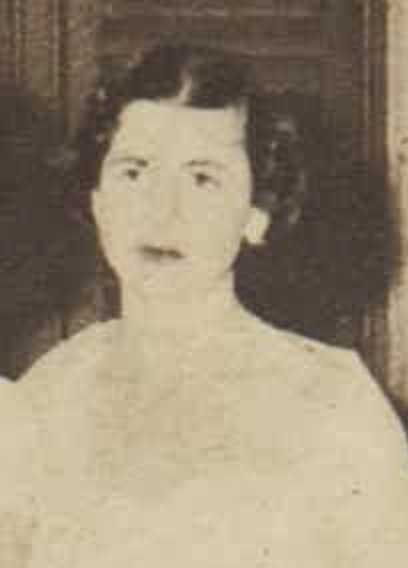
- Macarthur-Onslow in 1954
- Born: Annette Rosemary Macarthur-Onslow; 31 March 1933; Australia
- Died: 25 April 2026 (aged 93); Camden, New South Wales, Australia
- Education: East Sydney Technical College
- Occupations: Author; Illustrator; Artist
- Known for: Uhu (1969)
- Notable work: Uhu; Minnie; Pastures of the Blue Crane
- Awards: CBCA Book of the Year (1970); Diplôme d'Honneur, Biennial of Illustration Bratislava (1971)

Annette Rosemary Macarthur-Onslow (31 March 1933 – 25 April 2026) was an Australian author and book illustrator. She was best known for her 1969 book, Uhu, which won the CBCA Book of the Year in 1970.

== Early life and education ==
Born on 31 March 1933, Macarthur-Onslow was the eldest daughter of Winifred Owen and Edward Macarthur-Onslow. She completed her secondary education at Frensham School, Mittagong, later attended by her siblings, Pamela (Harrison, 1936–2012) and Phoebe (Atkinson, 1939–2018). She then studied art at East Sydney Technical College.

== Career ==
Macarthur-Onslow worked for a time in Sydney as a commercial artist. She also assisted Norman Hetherington with his puppets at department stores and, in 1957, live on ABC television. She left for London by sea in January 1958, planning to study puppetry there and in Europe. She continued her art studies while working for publishers, including Oxford University Press (OUP).

In the early 1960s Macarthur-Onslow began illustrating children's books for Australian and British authors. Gwen Hutchings wrote of her work in Sheena Porter's Nordy Bank that "the fine line drawings by Annette Macarthur-Onslow at times show exquisite detail, while others are shadowy and impressionistic". The book won the 1965 Carnegie Medal, while Hesba Brimsmead's Pastures of the Blue Crane which she illustrated for OUP won that year's CBCA Book of the Year. Uhu, which she wrote and illustrated, won the CBCA Book of the Year in 1970. It is the story of a small tawny owl in the Gloucestershire countryside.

Macarthur-Onslow was the first author/illustrator to represent Australia at the Biennial of Illustration Bratislava in 1971, where she was awarded a Diplome d'Honneur for Uhu and Minnie.

== Death ==
Macarthur-Onslow died in Camden on 25 April 2026, at the age of 93.

== Selected publications ==
=== As author/illustrator ===
- Uhu, Ure Smith, 1969
- Minnie, Ure Smith, 1971
- Round House, Collins, 1975
- The Giant Bamboo Happening, John Ferguson, 1982

=== As illustrator ===
- Animal Stories by Ruth Manning-Sanders, OUP, 1961
- Half a World Away by Nan Chauncy, OUP, 1962
- Pastures of the Blue Crane by Hesba Brinsmead, OUP, 1964
- Winged Skis by Elyne Mitchell, Hutchinson, 1964
- Victoria: the story of a great queen by Elisabeth Kyle, Thomas Nelson, 1964
- Nordy Bank by Sheena Porter, OUP, 1965
- Silver Brumbies of the South by Elyne Mitchell, Hutchinson, 1965
- Silver Brumby Kingdom by Elyne Mitchell, Hutchinson, 1966
- Birds: Poems by Judith Wright, Angus and Robertson, 1967
- Trim by Matthew Flinders, Collins, 1977
- The Man from Snowy River by Banjo Paterson, Nelson, 1986
