= Catherton Common =

Nature reserve in Shropshire, England

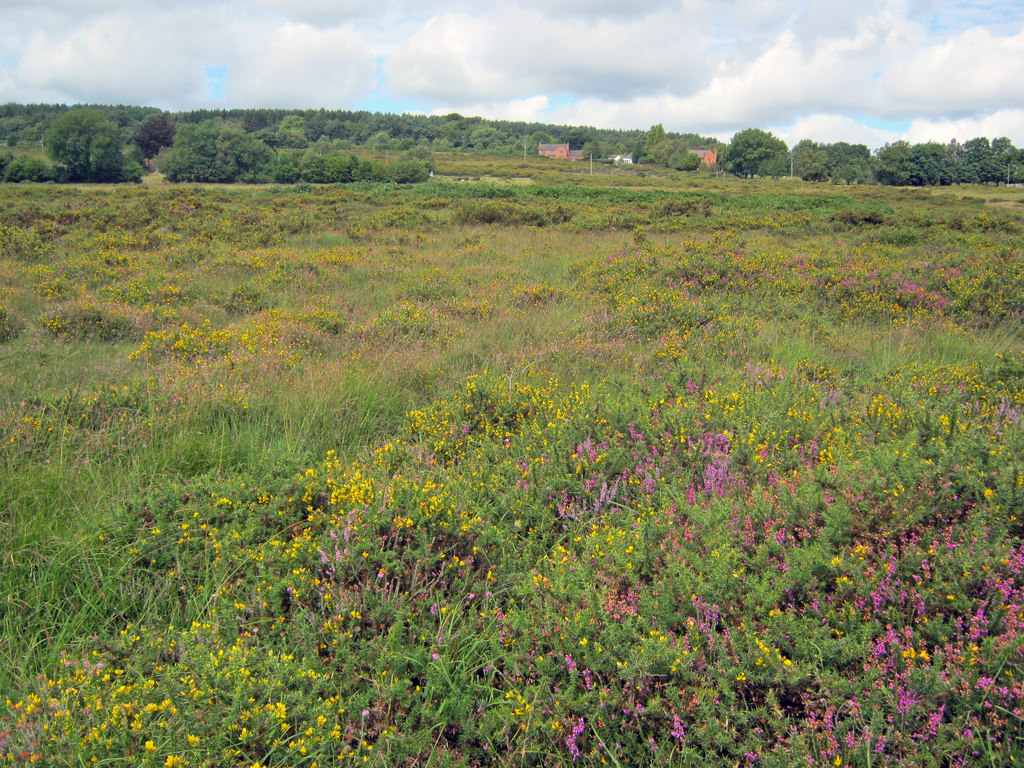

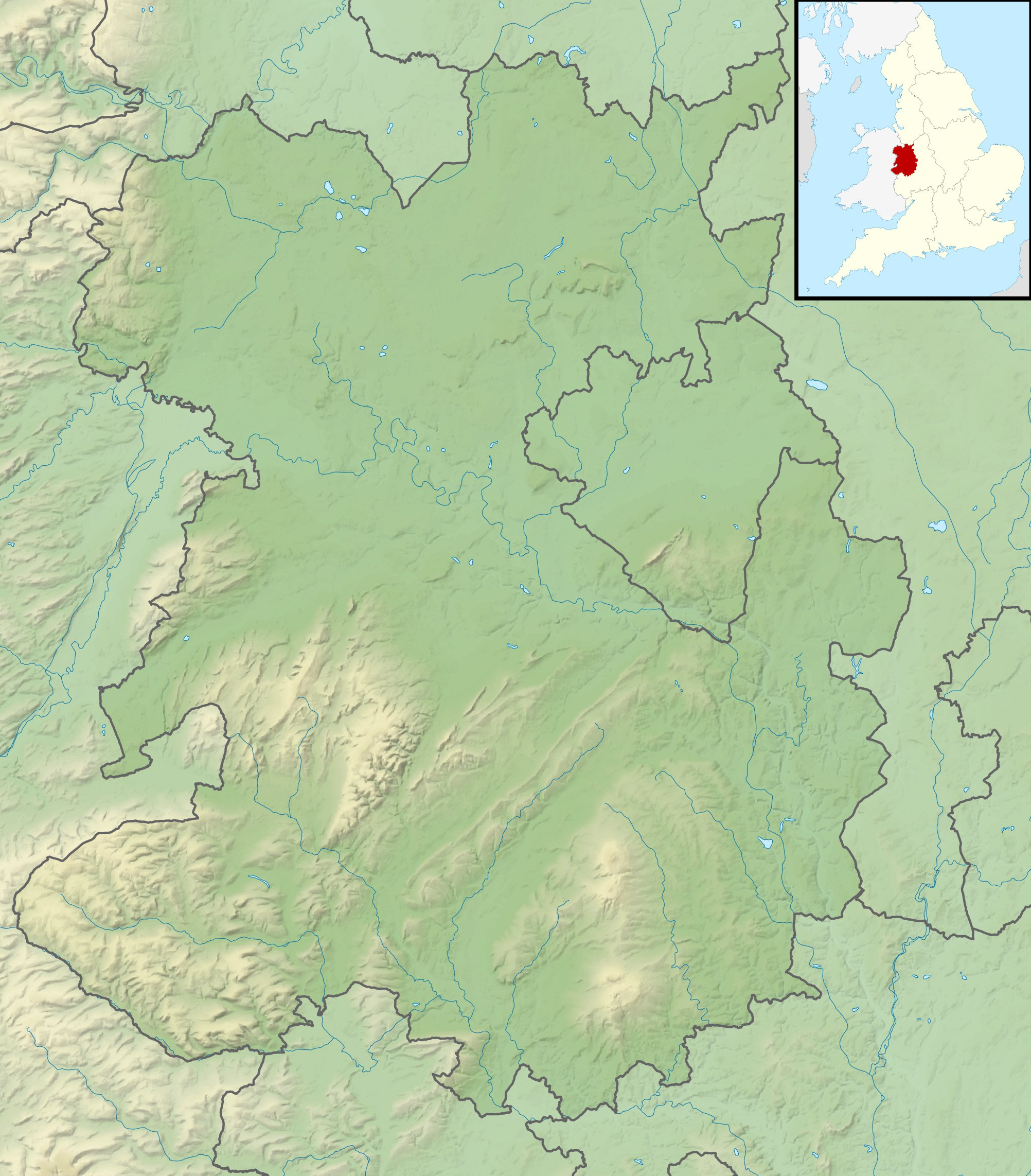
- Location within Shropshire
- Interactive map of Catherton Common
- Location: near Cleobury Mortimer, Shropshire
- OS grid: SO 624 778
- Coordinates: 52°23′48″N 2°33′14″W
- Area: 213 hectares (530 acres)
- Operator: Shropshire Wildlife Trust
- Designation: Site of Special Scientific Interest
- Website: www.shropshirewildlifetrust.org.uk/nature-reserves/catherton-common

Catherton Common is a nature reserve of the Shropshire Wildlife Trust, between Cleehill and Cleobury Mortimer in Shropshire, England. It is heathland, designated a Site of Special Scientific Interest.

== Description ==
The area of the reserve is 213 hectares (530 acres); it is an uncultivated landscape, in which houses and smallholdings are dispersed. There is heather, including cross-leaved heath, and deergrass which is rare in Shropshire. In wetter places there is bog asphodel and sundew.

Bird species to be seen include Eurasian skylark, European stonechat, yellowhammer, and common linnet.

=== Remains of mining ===
Coal mining on Catherton Common and the adjacent Clee Hills is recorded from the 13th century to the early 20th century. A representative sample of the mining remains on Catherton Common is listed as a scheduled monument. The evolution of mining over the period is evident, from the early working of coal outcrops, to medieval bell pits, and shaft mounds where larger pits were sunk from the early 17th to early 19th century.
