= Far Forest =

Village in Worcestershire, England

Coordinates: 52.37°N 2.399°W

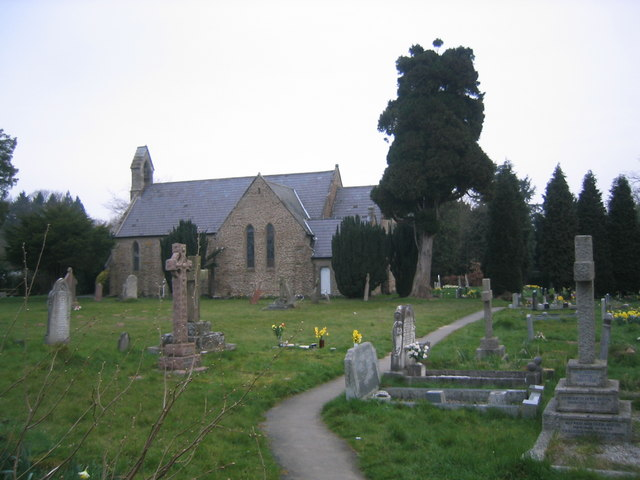
Holy Trinity Church, Far Forest

Far Forest is a small village in north Worcestershire, England, approximately 3.5 miles (5.6 km) west of Bewdley, and next to the border with Shropshire.

It is on the A4117 road, on the edge of the Wyre Forest near Fingerpost.

Far Forest is in the Wyre Forest District.

There is a public house, the Plough Inn, a primary school, a shop with a post office, and two churches: one Baptist, and one Anglican, called Holy Trinity Church.

The R&B Travel 292 bus service (Ludlow–Bewdley–Kidderminster) provides regular public buses from Monday to Saturday.

There is also a primary school called Far Forest Lea Memorial CE Primary School with around 121 students.

Mary Whitehouse, the conservative media activist, lived with her husband in Far Forest early in the 1970s. She later alleged they were forced to move away after opponent protestors tracked her down and picketed their home.
