= Burway Bridge =

Coordinates: 52°22′22″N 2°43′14″W

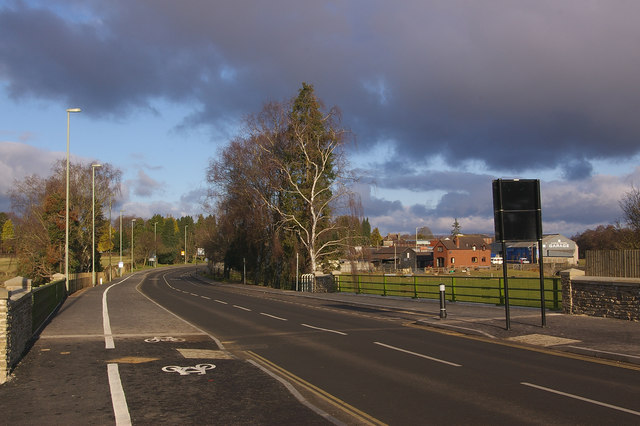
The "new" Burway Bridge, which forms part of the wide Coronation Avenue, here shown looking 'out' of Ludlow (towards Burway).

Burway Bridge is a bridge in Ludlow, Shropshire, England. It takes the B4361 road across the River Corve.

== Original bridge ==
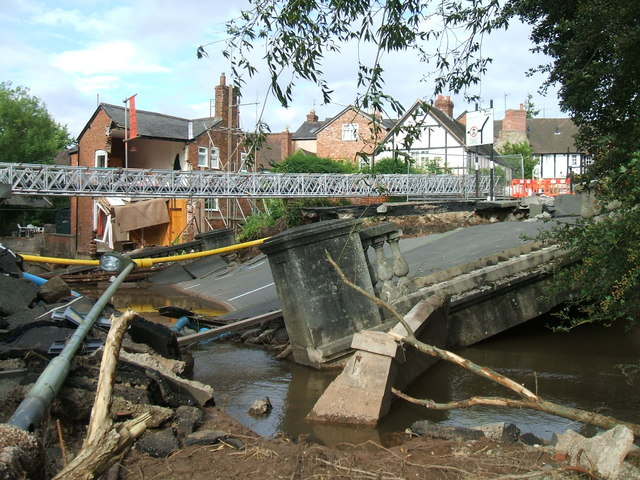
The original Burway Bridge having collapsed in 2007.

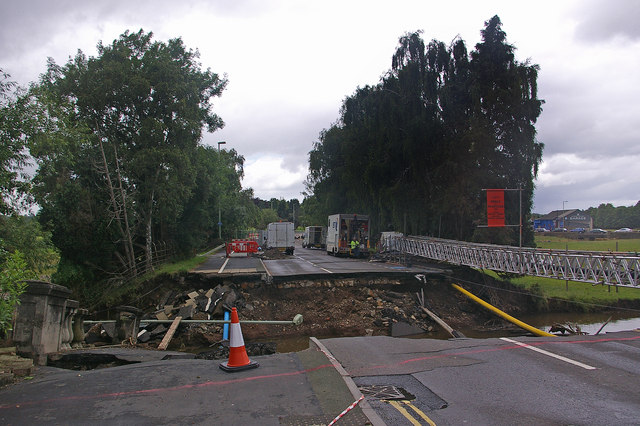
The gap in Coronation Avenue left by the collapsing of the 1950s bridge.

The original bridge was built in the mid-20th century to take the new Coronation Avenue across the Corve, relieving the historic Corve Bridge just upstream. Before its construction the A49 trunk road crossed Corve Bridge; its construction diverted that route, but consequently meant the less-major A4117 road crossed the Corve Bridge in order to meet the A49. The opening of the A49 Ludlow by-pass in 1979 removed these A roads from the vicinity, with the former A49 route crossing Burway Bridge re-classified as the B4361, which remains to the present day.

=== Collapse ===
The bridge was demolished on 27 June 2007 following heavy rainfall which caused serious flooding of the River Corve resulting in the collapse of the bridge and a neighbouring house.

== Rebuilding ==
Undertaken by Shropshire County Council, a temporary Bailey bridge was first opened in August 2007 to partially reopen the B4361. Over the next year, the council's consultants Mouchel designed a permanent bridge and this was constructed by McPhillips (Wellington) Ltd. Constructed to withstand any serious future flooding, the bridge now features a longer span to increase the volume capacity of the River Corve beneath.

The new bridge finally opened on 19 January 2009. (The inscription on the bridge reads "Burway Bridge 2008" as that was the year of its construction.)

The bridge now carries across the river not only two-way road traffic, but also a lane for car parking, a wide cycling & pedestrian pavement on one side of the carriageway, and a pedestrian pavement on the other side.

== See also ==
- 2007 United Kingdom floods
