= Mid Severn Sandstone Plateau =

Coordinates: 52°30′33″N 2°18′13″W

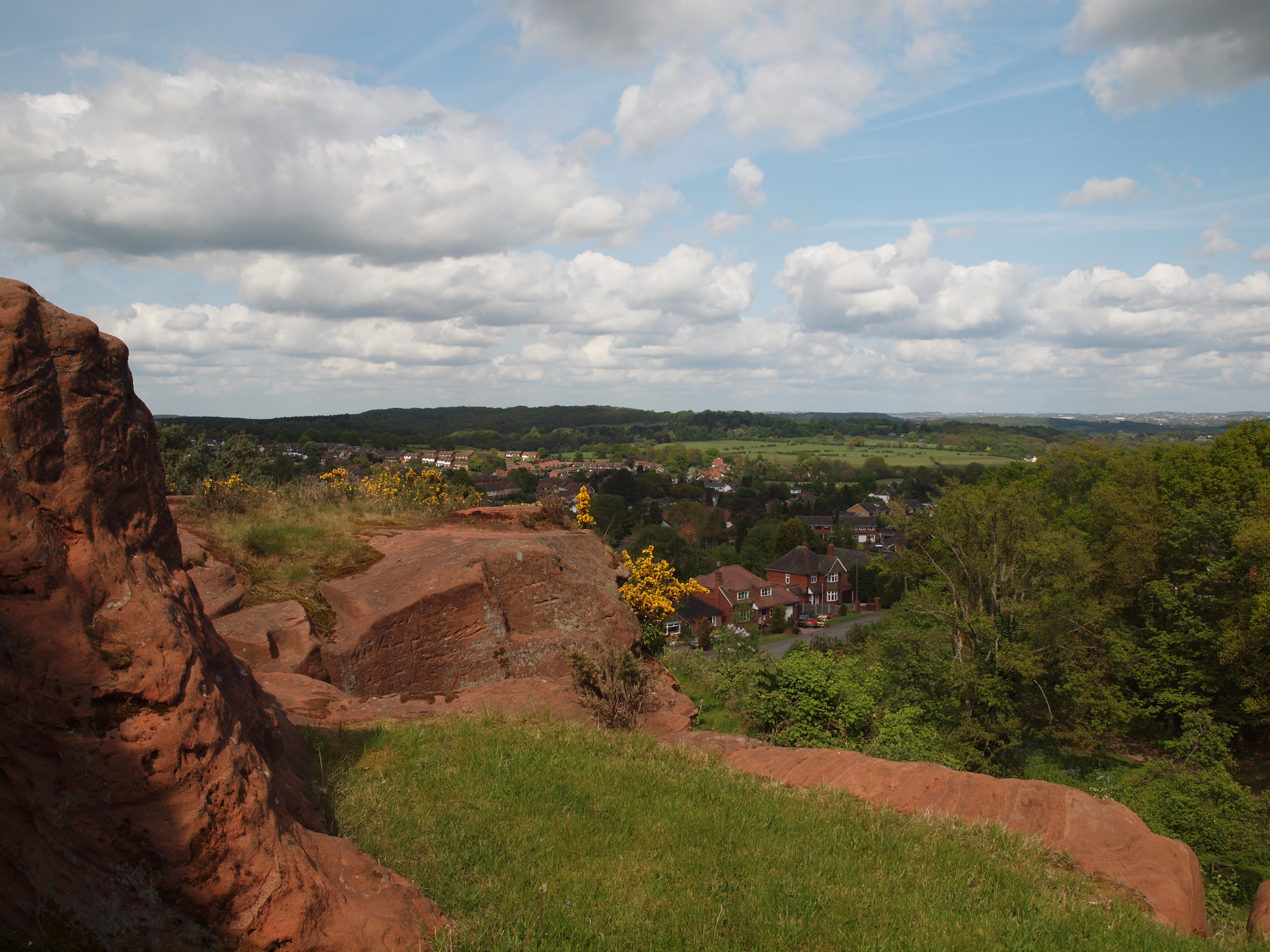
View from the rock houses in the sandstone at Kinver Edge

The Mid Severn Sandstone Plateau is a rural landscape and one of the natural regions of central England, straddling the border between the counties of Shropshire and Staffordshire. It stretches from the western fringes of the Birmingham conurbation to Telford in the north and Kidderminster in the south. The major feature of the plateau is the valley of the River Severn, which cuts through it from north to south. It consists of Permian and Triassic-age New Red Sandstone getting older as one goes west until one reaches Silurian and Carboniferous-age siltstones and coals west of the river.

== Geography ==
The plateau is listed as National Character Area 66 by Natural England, the UK Government's advisor on the natural environment. The NCA covers an area of 88,803 hectares (342.87 sq mi) and measures around 25 kilometres from west to east and 50 kilometres from north to south. To the west and southwest, the land ascends from the Severn Valley to the Shropshire Hills and Herefordshire Plateau. To the east it rises from the Stour Valley into the Black Country and Arden. In the south, the rolling terrain gradually descends into the Severn and Avon Vales, while, in the north, it transitions to the clays of the Shropshire and Staffordshire Plain.

There is a national nature reserve, the Wyre Forest NNR, within the region, as well as a small portion (13 ha) of the Shropshire Hills AONB. Its major watercourses are the rivers Severn, Stour and Worfe. The average elevation is 97 metres; the plateau reaching its highest point at 233 metres (764 ft).
