= Nordy Bank =

Iron Age hill fort in Shropshire, England

Coordinates: 52.4583°N 2.6257°W

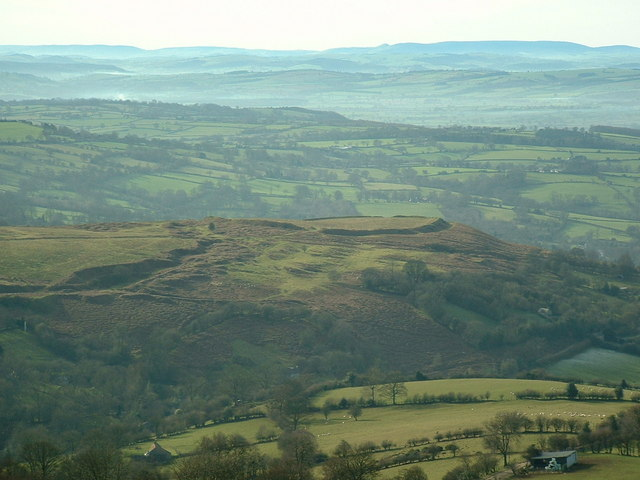
Nordy Bank from Brown Clee Hill

Nordy Bank is an Iron Age hill fort on Brown Clee Hill in the Shropshire Hills Area of Outstanding Natural Beauty in South Shropshire, England.

== Location ==
The nearest village is Clee St. Margaret, overlooking Ludlow, the nearest market town. The fort probably dates to between the late Bronze Age and the early Iron Age. The site is a scheduled monument under the Ancient Monuments and Archaeological Areas Act 1979.

== Description ==
Nordy Bank is a univallate (having a single circuit of ramparts for enclosure and defence) hill fort situated on the western end of a spur running west from the main plateau of Brown Clee Hill. The maximum dimensions of the oval enclosure are 260 m (850 ft) by 200 m (660 ft), and it covers an area of 3.2 hectares (7.9 acres). The main entrance seems to be on the northeastern portion, facing along the ridge. A broadening and lowering of the ramparts here suggest that there may have been a gatehouse structure. A secondary entrance lies halfway along the southern side; this one lies above a steep slope making it less vulnerable to attack, and there is no sign of a guard-house here. The other gaps in the rampart are thought to be modern. There are some slight indications of the remains of structures on the inner side of the rampart; this is most notable in the northwestern part where an 8 m (26 ft) square building seems to have been located. The fort will probably have been used as a stock enclosure, a place of refuge and a permanent settlement.

The defensive ditch earthworks are in good condition although past quarrying has damaged part of the ramparts on the southeastern part.

The Jack Mytton Way long distance footpath passes adjacent to the site and the Shropshire Way runs 2 km to the northeast.

Nordy Bank is the location setting of Sheena Porter's novel Nordy Bank (1964).
