= Listed buildings in Clee St. Margaret =

Clee St. Margaret is a civil parish in Shropshire, England. It contains eight listed buildings that are recorded in the National Heritage List for England. Of these, one is listed at Grade II*, the middle of the three grades, and the others are at Grade II, the lowest grade. The parish contains the village of Clee St. Margaret and the surrounding countryside. Six of the listed buildings are in the village, and consist of a church and a memorial in the churchyard, a farmhouse and a farm building, a complex of mill buildings, and a telephone kiosk. The other two listed buildings are to the southwest at Cold Weston, and consist of a redundant church and a memorial in its churchyard.

== Key ==
Grade	Criteria
II*	Particularly important buildings of more than special interest
II	Buildings of national importance and special interest

== Buildings ==
Name and location	Photograph	Date	Notes	Grade
St Margaret's Church; 52.45543°N 2.64228°W		11th century	Alterations were made to the church in the 13th and 15th centuries, it was restored in 1872, and additions were made in 1897. It is built in stone and has a tiled roof with ornamental ridge tiles. The church consists of a nave, a south porch, a chancel, and a north vestry, and there is a bellcote at the west end. It contains Norman, Early English, and Decorated features.	II*
Old Church of St Mary; 52.44338°N 2.66090°W		12th century	The church, now redundant, was altered in the 14th century and restored in 1876, and the bellcote was added in 1894. It is built in stone with a tile roof, and consists of a nave and a chancel, with a bellcote on the west gable. The north doorway and a window on the south side of the chancel are Norman in style. The church was converted into a house in 1998–2000.	II
Church Farmhouse; 52.45543°N 2.64185°W	—	17th century	A farmhouse, later a private house, it was extended in the 19th and 20th centuries. The house is in stone with timber framing in the upper storey, and has a tile roof. There are two storeys and a T-shaped plan, consisting of a main range, a cross-wing, and extension wings. The windows are casements.	II
Headstone; 52.44331°N 2.66083°W	—	Early 18th century	The headstone is n the churchyard of the Old Church of St Mary, and is to the memory of Robert Rickard. It is in ashlar stone, and consists of a rectangular slab set vertically with a carved curved top and an inscription on the front.	II
Barn east of Church Farmhouse; 52.45544°N 2.64149°W	—	18th century	The barn is in stone with a tile roof. It has a single storey and a loft, and four bays. It has various openings, some with segmental heads, and ventilation slots.	II
Mill House, mill building and bakehouse 52.45620°N 2.64428°W	—	18th century	The buildings are in sandstone, with weatherboarding on the agricultural buildings, the house and mill have tile roofs, and the roof of the bakehouse is slated. The house has a single storey, an attic and a cellar, and attached to it are a pigsty and a barn. There is a central doorway with a canopy, and the windows are casements. The former corn watermill has two storeys and an attic, and the bakehouse has a single storey.	II
Slab Memorial; 52.45535°N 2.64222°W	—	Late 18th century	The memorial is in the churchyard of St Margaret's Church. It is in stone and consists of a slab on a plinth, with an ornament in the corner and a moulded edge.	II
Telephone kiosk 52.45635°N 2.64114°W		1935	A K6 type telephone kiosk, designed by Giles Gilbert Scott. Constructed in cast iron with a square plan and a dome, it has three unperforated crowns in the top panels.	II
