= Angelbank =

Coordinates: 52.380°N 2.629°W

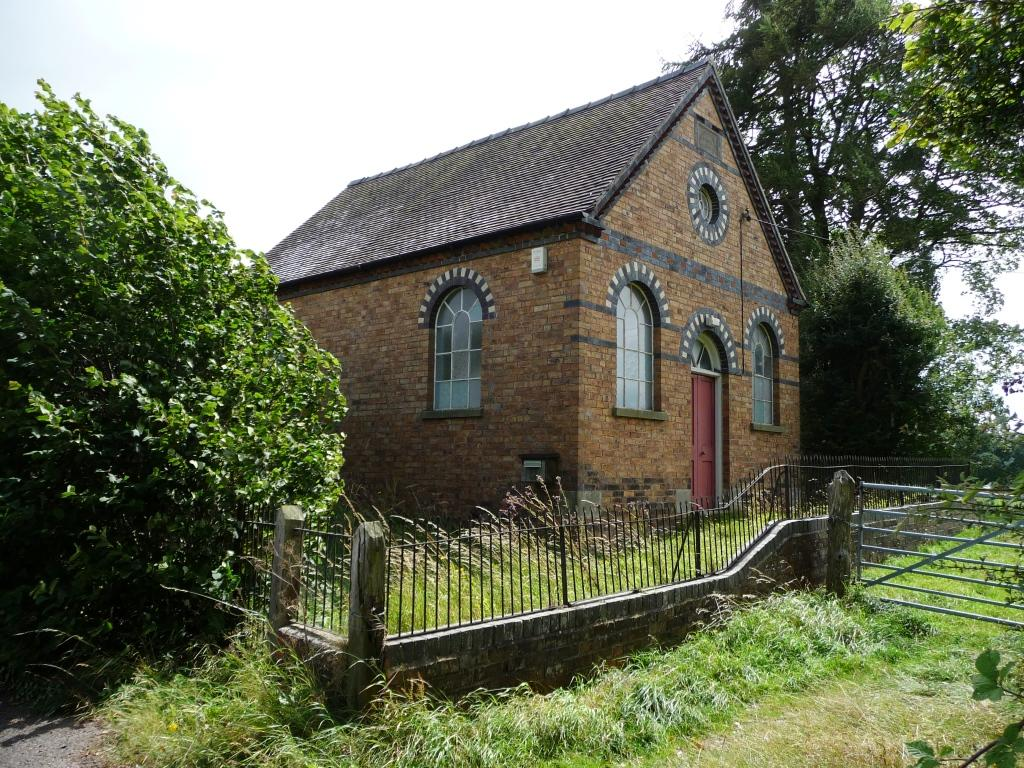
- Angelbank Primitive Methodist Chapel

- Location within Shropshire
- OS grid reference: SO571760
- Civil parish: Bitterley
- Unitary authority: Shropshire
- Ceremonial county: Shropshire
- Region: West Midlands
- Country: England
- Sovereign state: United Kingdom
- Post town: LUDLOW
- Postcode district: SY8
- Dialling code: 01584
- Police: West Mercia
- Fire: Shropshire
- Ambulance: West Midlands
- UK Parliament: Ludlow

Angelbank (or Angel Bank) is a small settlement in south Shropshire, England.

It is located on the A4117 road, between Ludlow and Cleehill; the road goes uphill towards Clee Hill Village and this incline is called Angel Bank. There is also a lane leading off this main road called Angel Lane.
