= Sheena Porter =

British author of children's novels (born 1935)

Sheena Porter (1935-2010) is a British author of children's novels. She won the 1964 Carnegie Medal from the Library Association, recognising Nordy Bank as the year's best children's book by a British subject.

Sheena Porter worked as a librarian in Leicester, Nottingham and Shropshire, and ultimately lived in Ludlow.

Her work is particularly notable for its atmosphere and characterization. It has a feeling for landscape, often portraying actual places, especially in the high country of the Welsh Marches, such as Nordy Bank, and the Long Mynd in The Knockers. She also weaved the history and folklore of the region into her narratives.

== Selected works ==
- The Bronze Chrysanthemum (1961), illustrated by Shirley Hughes
- Hills and Hollows (1962), illus. Victor Ambrus
- Jacobs' Ladder (1963), illus. Ambrus
- Nordy Bank (1964), illus. Annette Macarthur-Onslow
- The Knockers (1965), illus. Gareth Floyd
- Deerfold (1966), illus. Ambrus
- The Scapegoat (1968), illus. Doreen Roberts
- The Valley of Carrig-Wen (1971), illus. Roberts
- The Hospital (1973), illus. Robin Jacques
