= Fingerpost, Worcestershire =

Hamlet in Worcestershire, England

Coordinates: 52.363°N 2.388°W

Fingerpost is a hamlet and road junction in north Worcestershire, England, approximately 3 miles (4.8 km) west of Bewdley.

It is located at the junction of the A456 and A4117 roads, on the edge of the Wyre Forest and is named for a notable fingerpost that once existed at this historic junction.

Fingerpost is in the civil parish of Rock and the Wyre Forest District. The parish council erected a large commemorative stone near the Fingerpost junction for the Diamond Jubilee of Queen Elizabeth II.

Further along the A4117 is Far Forest, beyond which is Shropshire.
