= Shropshire Hills =

Upland area in Shropshire, West Midlands

Coordinates: 52.522°N 2.719°W

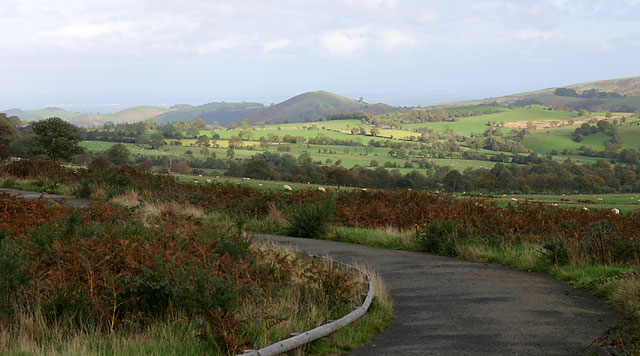
View from below the Stiperstones looking NE towards the Hollies

The Shropshire Hills are a dissected upland area and one of the natural regions of England. They lie wholly within the county of Shropshire and encompass several distinctive and well-known landmarks, such as the Long Mynd, Wenlock Edge, The Wrekin and the Clees.

The Shropshire Hills lie south of the county town of Shrewsbury between the Welsh border and Much Wenlock, extending as far south as Ludlow. To the north they are bounded by the Shropshire, Cheshire and Staffordshire Plain, to the east by the Severn Valley and Mid Severn Sandstone Plateau, to the southeast by Knighton and the Teme Valley and to the southwest by the Clun and North West Herefordshire Hills.

== Environment ==
The Shropshire Hills are listed as Natural Area No. 42 and also as National Character Area 65 by Natural England, the UK Government's advisor on the natural environment. The NCA covers an area of 107,902 hectares (416.61 sq mi) and measure around 50 kilometres (31 mi) from west to east and north to south. The dominant pattern of the hills is a series of southwest to northeast ridges, scarps and valleys. They are characterized by steep, rounded 'whaleback' hills, often crowned with open moorland, with woodland dressing the steeper slopes. There are scattered farms in dales and sheltering in valleys; larger settlements being confined to the Stretton Valley and A49 corridor.

== Major summits ==
Roughly a half of the NCA lies within the Shropshire Hills AONB. In addition, the region contains two Special Areas of Conservation (The Stiperstones & The Hollies SAC; Downton Gorge SAC) and a national nature reserve (The Stiperstones NNR) as well as 73 Sites of Special Scientific Interest, the latter totalling 4,893 hectares (12,090 acres). Its major watercourses are the rivers Corve, Onny, Severn and Teme and the Ledwyche and Rea brooks. The average elevation is 84 metres (276 ft); the highest point is Brown Clee Hill at 540 metres (1,770 ft). Significant summits in the Shropshire Hills include:

- Brown Clee (540m),
- Stiperstones (536m),
- Titterstone Clee (533m),
- Long Mynd (Pole Bank) (516m),
- Caer Caradoc (459m),
- Heath Mynd (452m),
- Hope Bowdler (426m),
- The Wrekin (407m),
- Ragleth Hill (398m),
- Lawley (377m).
