= Stiperstones =

Hill in the county of Shropshire, England

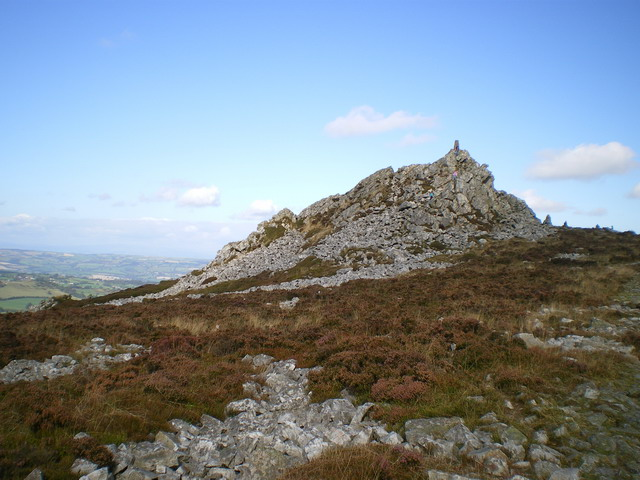
- Manstone Rock

Highest point
- Elevation: 536 m (1,759 ft)
- Prominence: 357 m (1,171 ft)
- Parent peak: Plynlimon
- Listing: Marilyn
- Coordinates: 52°34′55″N 2°56′06″W

Geography
- Location within England
- Location: Shropshire, England
- Topo map: OS Landranger 137

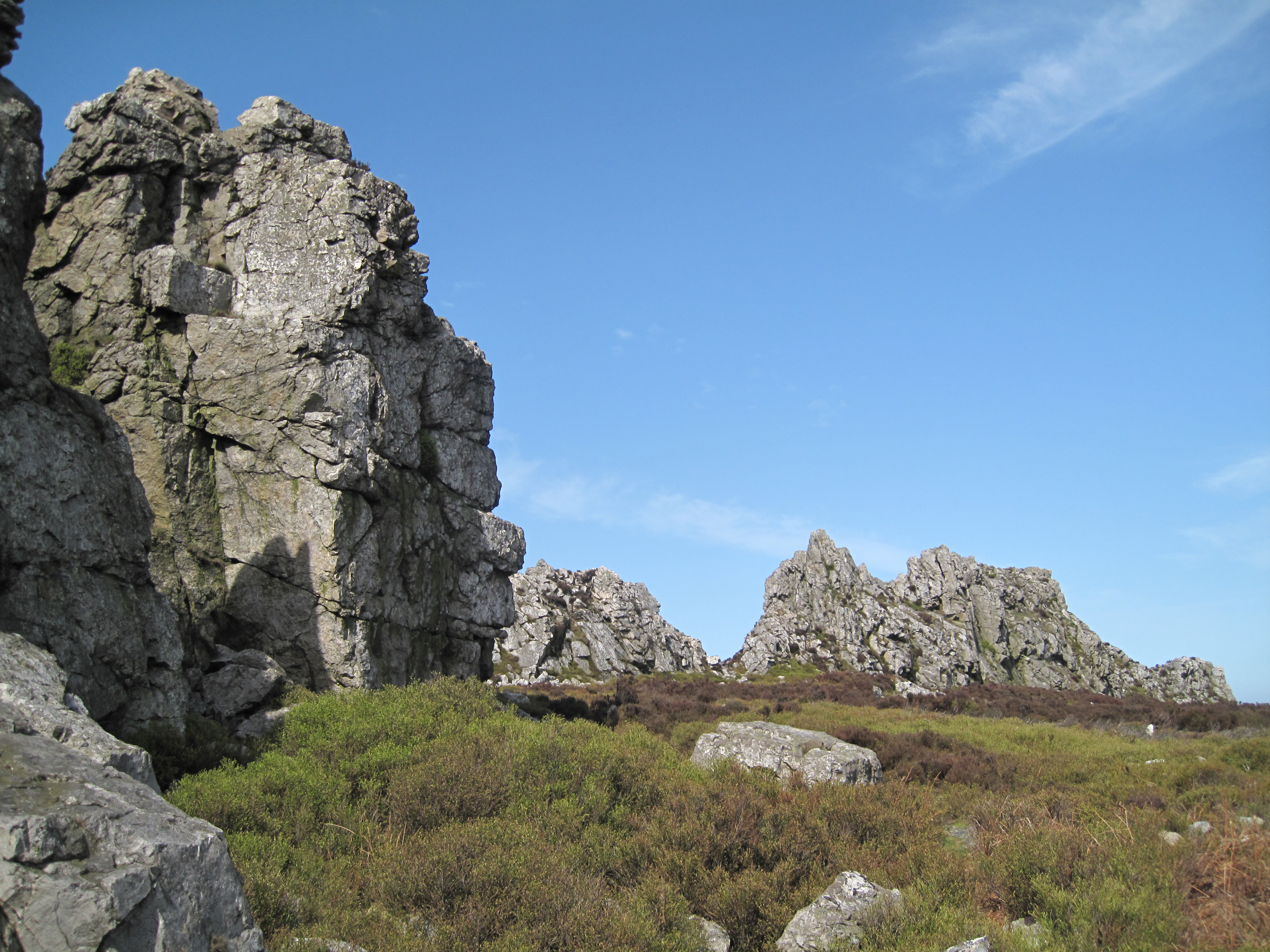
Shattered Cambrian quartzite at the Devil's Chair, Stiperstones

The Stiperstones (Welsh: Carneddau Teon) is a distinctive hill in Shropshire, England. The quartzite rock of the ridge formed some 480 million years ago. During the last Ice Age Stiperstones lay on the eastern margin of the Welsh ice sheet. The hill itself was not glaciated though glaciers occupied surrounding valleys and it was subject to intense freezing and thawing which shattered the quartzite into a mass of jumbled scree surrounding several residual rocky tors. At 536 metres (1,759 ft) above sea level it is the second-highest hill in the county, surpassed only by Brown Clee Hill (540 metres (1,772 ft)). Stiperstones' 8-kilometre (5 mi) summit ridge is crowned by several jagged outcrops of rock, which may be seen silhouetted against the sky.

== Geography ==
The Stiperstones is noted for its tors of quartzite. The principal ones are named as follows, from north-east to south-west:

- Shepherd's Rock (grid reference SO373998)
- Devil's Chair (SO368991)
- Manstone Rock (SO367986)
- Cranberry Rock (SO365981)
- Nipstone Rock (SO365969)
- The Rock (SO351963)

Manstone Rock is the highest of these at 536 metres (1,759 ft), and is topped with a trig point. The Devil's Chair is the largest and best known.

The Stiperstones ridge is a good place to view the upland landscape of the Shropshire Hills, particularly the Long Mynd to the east, and also gives extensive views towards the North Shropshire plain and the hills of Mid Wales.

== Geology ==
The tors are formed from heavily faulted Ordovician age, grey-white quartzose sandstones known as the Stiperstones Quartzite Formation. This Arenigian age rock unit which dips steeply to the WNW is between 120 and 325m thick. The western slopes of the hill dropping to Stiperstones village are formed in the overlying Mytton Flag Formation, whereas the eastern slopes are formed in the underlying, and hence older, mudstones of the Shineton Shale Formation. Faulting narrows the outcrop of the Mytton Flags along the southern part of the Stiperstones ridge and the mudstones of the Hope Shale Formation with their interbedded volcaniclastics form much of the afforested ground to the west. The outcrop of the Stipertones Quartzite continues south-southwest to Black Rhadley Hill and peters out just beyond Heath Mynd. To the north-northeast, it continues as far as Pontesbury.

Much of the ground around the tors is covered by head, a gravelly and bouldery deposit arising during the present Quaternary period and deriving from the rocks immediately beneath it. There are also some isolated peat deposits in places. Of particular note is the patterned ground surrounding the tors; some of the best examples of the periglacial features known as stone stripes and polygons in England.

== Wildlife and conservation ==
The Stiperstones is a National Nature Reserve and Site of Special Scientific Interest (SSSI). and is within the Shropshire Hills Area of Outstanding Natural Beauty. It is a haven for wildlife, with birds that are normally associated with upland areas present, including red grouse, Eurasian curlew, peregrine falcon and the rare ring ouzel.

Recently, a project called Back to Purple has commenced, to clear some of the hill of remaining plantations of coniferous and wooded areas, restoring the land to heather-based heath, with seasonal purple-flowering heather covering the summits around the tors and enhancing the views of the Stiperstones from the surrounding peaks and valleys. Back to Purple is managed by a partnership of Natural England, Forest Enterprise and the Shropshire Wildlife Trust. Their work has so far seen removal of thousands of pine trees and other conifers, including the whole Gatten Plantation (still shown on OS maps) and the previously covered Nipstone Rock has emerged from hiding. Thousands of heather seedlings have been successfully planted to supplement natural regeneration. To balance this out and complement it further work below summit level has also aimed at restoring grasslands, rich in herbs, hay meadows, wet flushes which produce bog cotton, Heath Bedstraw and the rarer Mountain Pansy and natural woodlands.

== Cultural references ==
The general area has a long history of lead mining, most notably during the Roman occupation of Britain. Several pigs of lead have been found nearby, and the tradition continued into Victorian times.

The area around the Stiperstones is rich in myths and folklore relating to the rocks of the Devil's Chair. According to one legend, the ghost of Wild Edric, a Saxon earl who held lands that were confiscated after 1066 and successfully defied the Normans, for a time at least, rides the hills whenever England is threatened by invasion. The Stiperstones feature in the literary works of Mary Webb, who drew it as The Diafol (translated from Welsh, "Devil's") Mountain in her novel The Golden Arrow (1916), of children's author Malcolm Saville, and in a jazz work commissioned by Music at Leasowes Bank, written and performed by the Clark Tracey Quintet. D.H. Lawrence used the Stiperstones and the Devil's Chair in particular as a setting for his novel St Mawr (1925).

The Half Man Half Biscuit album 90 Bisodol (Crimond) contains a track entitled "Descent of the Stiperstones".

An exaggerated version of the Stiperstones is included as a location in the 2020 video game Assassin's Creed Valhalla.

== Bog Mine and Visitor Centre ==
Until the early 20th century lead was mined at The Bog, just west of Stiperstones. The mine at The Bog and the adjacent Stiperstones outcrop were only viable because of a geological movement; over time the movement of the tectonic plates landed at this site, combined with the movement of the earth it crumpled the layers and the softest layers were then eroded away. After mining stopped, the undisturbed remnants provided a range of wildlife habitats: birds nest in the old buildings, bats roost in the old mine tunnels, and reservoirs and ponds are ideal for aquatic life.

The Bog Visitor Centre is the main facility for visitors to the Stiperstones. It is housed in the former village school and retains its old interior design. It provides historical information about the past workers, mining, and present-day work to restore the landscape. Facilities at the centre include toilets and car parking (with facilities for the disabled including reserved parking, toilets and ramps). Activities include walking, with two main circular walks called Mucklewick Walk and Flenny Bank Walk and a variety of riding routes.

== 2012 fire ==
On 25 July 2012 part of the reserve was devastated by fire, said to have been a result of the sudden upturn in dry, hot weather coupled with the large amount of dry heather on the hills. More than 70 firemen battled the fire between 15.00 and 22.00 BST; smoke could be seen up to 10 miles away in the county town of Shrewsbury. Firefighters remained on site throughout the night because of the severity of the fire and the extent of the affected areas.

== Gallery ==
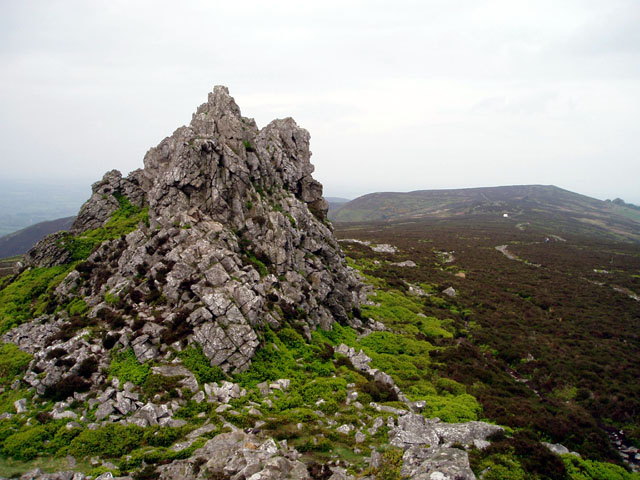
The Devil's Chair, looking northwards

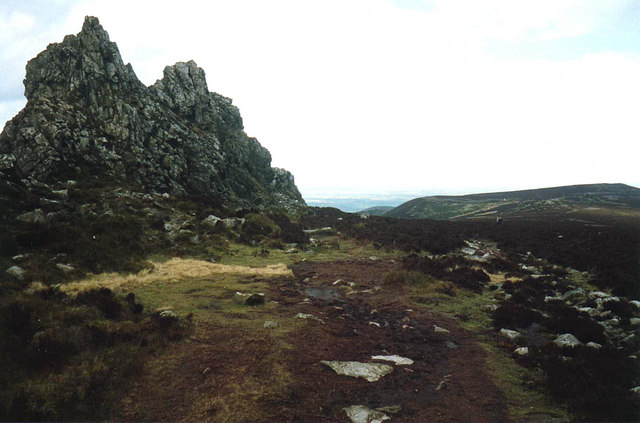
The Stiperstones feature in the literary works of Mary Webb and children's author Malcolm Saville.
