= Clee St. Margaret =

Village in Shropshire, England

Coordinates: 52.455°N 2.641°W

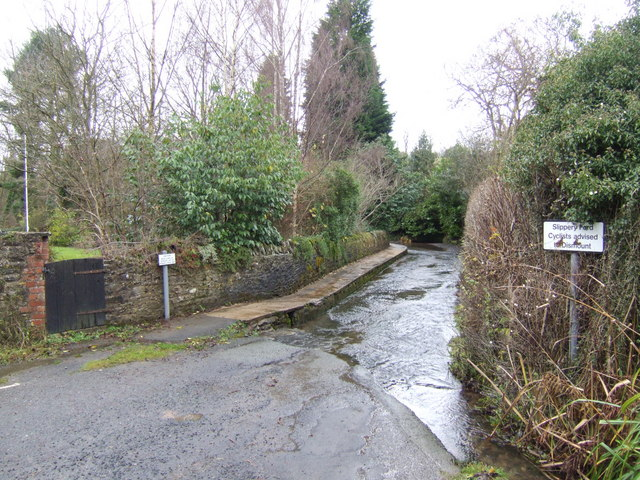
- Ford on the Clee Brook

- Location within Shropshire
- Population: 162 (2011)
- OS grid reference: SO564844
- Civil parish: Clee St. Margaret
- Unitary authority: Shropshire
- Ceremonial county: Shropshire
- Region: West Midlands
- Country: England
- Sovereign state: United Kingdom
- Post town: CRAVEN ARMS
- Postcode district: SY7
- Dialling code: 01584
- Police: West Mercia
- Fire: Shropshire
- Ambulance: West Midlands
- UK Parliament: South Shropshire
- Website: http://www.clee.org.uk/

Clee St. Margaret is a small village and civil parish in the Clee Hills area of Shropshire, England. It is seven miles north east (about a fifteen-minute drive) from the market town of Ludlow.

It lies at approximately 205 metres (673 ft) above sea level. The Clee Brook passes through the settlement, as a 50-metre long, shallow ford. Local land use includes two small vineyards and extensive sheep grazing.

There is a 900-year-old parish church and a village hall, but no pub. Clee St. Margaret had five pubs earlier during the height of the quarrying on nearby Brown Clee Hill. Historically the settlement also had a shop, a Methodist Chapel, a school and a post office.

== Population and housing ==
The parish includes the hamlet of Cockshutford, at foot of Nordy Bank.

The population in 2001 of Clee St. Margaret was 126, 65 being males and 61 being females. Over the years the population of this small village has declined: in 1871 it was over double today's average, at 297.

The number of houses has also fluctuated. From 1841 to 1881 it rose from 71 to 76, before declining to 48 in 1921; since then it has increased slightly, reaching 51 in 1961 and today there are 65 houses.

In recent years there has been a slight rise in the number of households. This may be due to the housing density declining in recent years. In 1931, 1609 people were living with more than one person whereas in 2001 only 510 residents in South Shropshire were living with more than one person. The average house price of Clee St Margaret was about £281,462 in April 2012. Prices are relatively low compared to the rest of England because of the location and because most houses are small.

== Education ==
Clee St. Margaret's population is made up mostly of families and couples. The education level for the area of South Shropshire has improved greatly. In 1851 school attendance was lower than those not attending, however in 2001, 716 children were attending and only 191 stayed at home. There are two primary schools within 6 km radiance and five playgroups centres within 7 km radiance.

The proportion of residents with a degree living in the South Shropshire district is relatively low. In 2011, residents without a degree were 23,029 and those with a degree 5,393.

== Employment ==
In 1881 the land was generally used for agriculture. Most of the male residents worked in agriculture, and the females were employed in domestic services or offices. Today, the service sector provides the most employment, employing 10,364 residents of South Shropshire, while 1,855 are employed in agriculture. Most of the population travel to work, on average 38.80 km, implying they are employed in services in Kidderminster or Shrewsbury.

== Governance ==
The village falls within the electoral ward simply called Clee. This ward includes several of the villages in the Clee Hills, with a total population taken at the 2011 census of 4,595.

== Religion and politics ==
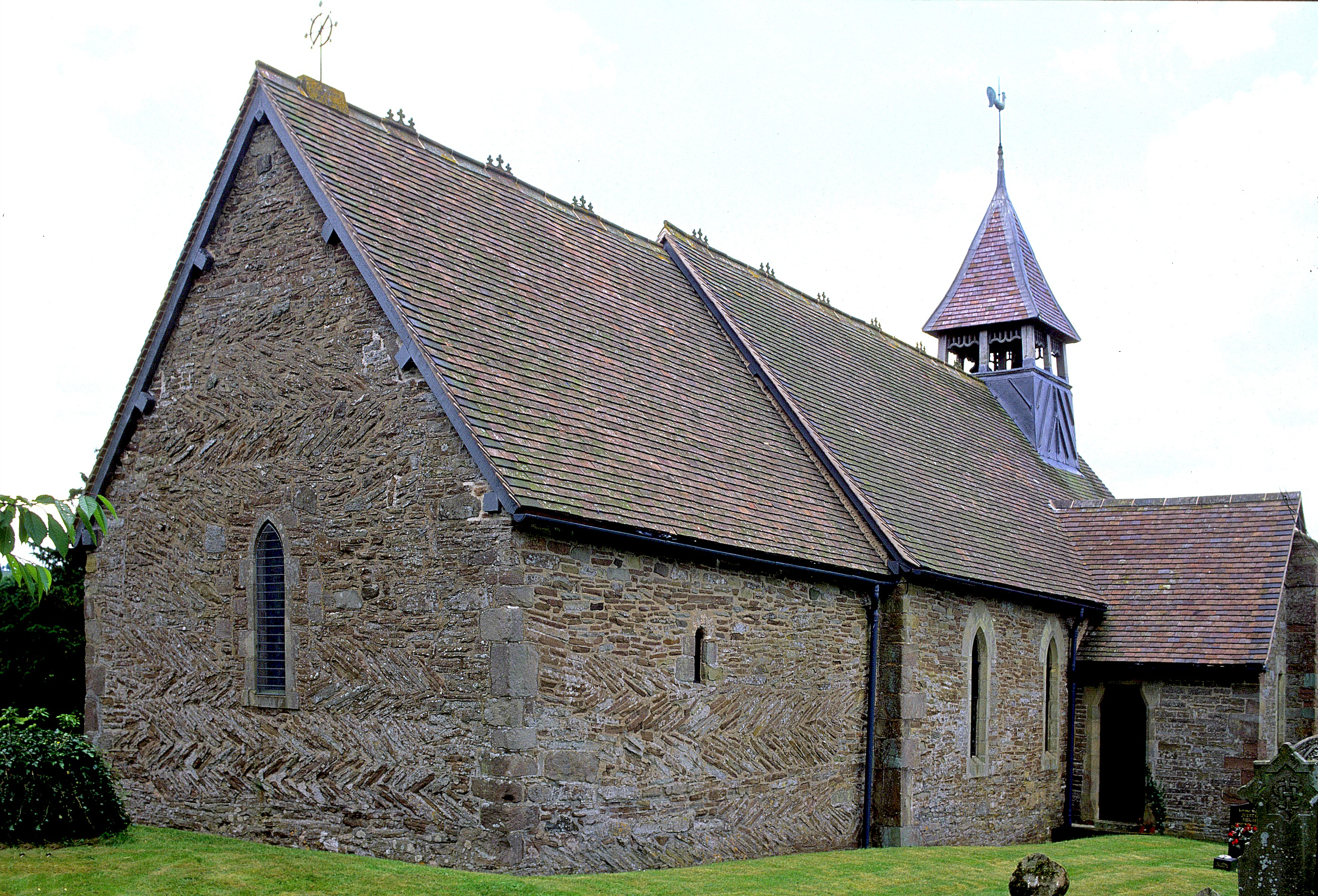
The Church of St Margaret is a Grade II* listed building and was founded in the 11th century.

The main religion in Clee St Margaret and the surrounding area of South Shropshire is Christianity, with Islam and Buddhism following. The church was renewed in 1860 and is used regularly for Christian worship

In the 1851 Religious Census, there was a congregation of Southcottians or "Millenarians" worshiping at Cockshutford in the parish.

Clee St Margaret is in the Conservative-held constituency of South Shropshire. The member of parliament for the constituency is Stuart Anderson, elected in 2024.

== Climate ==
Clee St Margaret is within The Midlands of England, causing it to experience a mixture of both southern and northern climatic conditions. When rainfall is concerned it is a transitional area between Wales and the East of England. As the Midlands region is at some distance from the sea, the annual range of temperature is more pronounced than in most parts of the UK. It is subjected to sharp winter frosts and occasional very hot summer days, particularly in the south and east of the region where Clee St Margaret is located. These temperature extremes of both winter and summer are a key characteristic of the Midlands climate.

The coldest months are January and February, reaching highs of 7 °C and lows of 0 °C. The warmest months are July and August, with highs of 21 °C and lows of 10 °C.

Climate data for Shropshire, The Midlands
Month	Jan	Feb	Mar	Apr	May	Jun	Jul	Aug	Sep	Oct	Nov	Dec	Year
Mean daily maximum °C (°F)	7 (45)	7 (45)	10 (50)	12 (54)	16 (61)	19 (66)	21 (70)	21 (70)	18 (64)	14 (57)	10 (50)	7 (45)	14 (56)
Mean daily minimum °C (°F)	0 (32)	0 (32)	1 (34)	2 (36)	5 (41)	8 (46)	10 (50)	10 (50)	7 (45)	4 (39)	2 (36)	1 (34)	4 (40)
Average precipitation cm (inches)	5.48 (2.16)	4.11 (1.62)	4.53 (1.78)	4.64 (1.83)	5.42 (2.13)	5.43 (2.14)	5.18 (2.04)	5.69 (2.24)	5.88 (2.31)	6.18 (2.43)	6.08 (2.39)	6.10 (2.40)	64.72 (25.47)

== See also ==
- Listed buildings in Clee St. Margaret
