= Clee Hills =

Range of hills in Shropshire, England

Coordinates: 52°25′N 2°40′W

The Clee Hills are a range of hills in Shropshire, England near Ludlow, consisting of Brown Clee Hill 540 metres (1,770 ft), the highest peak in Shropshire, and Titterstone Clee Hill 533 metres (1,749 ft). They are both in the Shropshire Hills Area of Outstanding Natural Beauty.

== Geography ==
The hills stretch over 24-kilometre (15 mi) and run north–south, and for about this distance the lowest point along the hills is just under 300 metres (980 ft). Titterstone Clee Hill is around five miles south of Brown Clee Hill.

The B4364 road from Ludlow to Bridgnorth runs between the two hills, offering good views of both. The hills have been said to form a "gateway" from the built up areas of the West Midlands to the hills and rural landscape of Wales and are at the heart of the Welsh Marches. Much quarrying has taken place on the hills over the years, and there are large air traffic control domes and radar towers on the summits of both hills which can be seen for many miles around.

=== Views ===
Views from the west of the hills spread as far as Snowdonia and Cadair Idris, the Brecon Beacons, the Black Mountains, The Long Mynd, Stiperstones Shropshire's third highest peak, Corndon Hill and Radnor Forest. To the south are the Malvern Hills and the Cotswolds, and to the east are the Clent Hills, Turner's Hill, Barr Beacon and the spread of the West Midlands. To the north is Cannock Chase, and on a very clear day the hills of the Peak District including The Roaches and Winter Hill.

It is possible to see the urban centres of Dudley and Wolverhampton, with Wolverhampton Wanderers FC's Molineux stadium visible. The hills mark a clear eastern boundary to the Shropshire Hills, and are just west of the Severn Valley between Bridgnorth and Bewdley. The hills stand out over the surrounding countryside and can be seen from well into Staffordshire, Worcestershire, Herefordshire and the Black Country. They can also be seen, on a clear day, from the M5 Motorway on the northbound approach to Bromsgrove. The hills were created by glacial activity in the last ice age.

In the summer the hills attract many visitors from the Black Country and other parts of the West Midlands as well as much further afield, but care must be taken during winter, as though most of the time there is no snow and ice on the hills, when it comes it can be sudden and severe with very strong gales and blizzards often closing roads on the hill.

The village of Cleehill, lies on the slopes of Titterstone Clee Hill, about halfway between Ludlow and Cleobury Mortimer.

The area is important for wildlife, with peregrine, kestrel, Northern wheatear, European stonechat, skylark, Eurasian curlew and barn owl often seen, as well as adders, rabbits, and other birds, including ravens. In late July and early August 2007, Catherton Common near Titterstone Clee was home to a very rare woodchat shrike.

== The hills in popular culture ==
- There is a long-standing rumour in the local area – that is that they are the highest land eastwards until the Ural Mountains in Russia. According to OpenCycleMap this appears to be true, with no land above 500 metres (1,600 ft) until the Urals. It has even been known for radios in the area to pick up Radio Moscow signals, hence the name of the former pub near Clee Hill village, The Kremlin Inn, which closed in 2015.

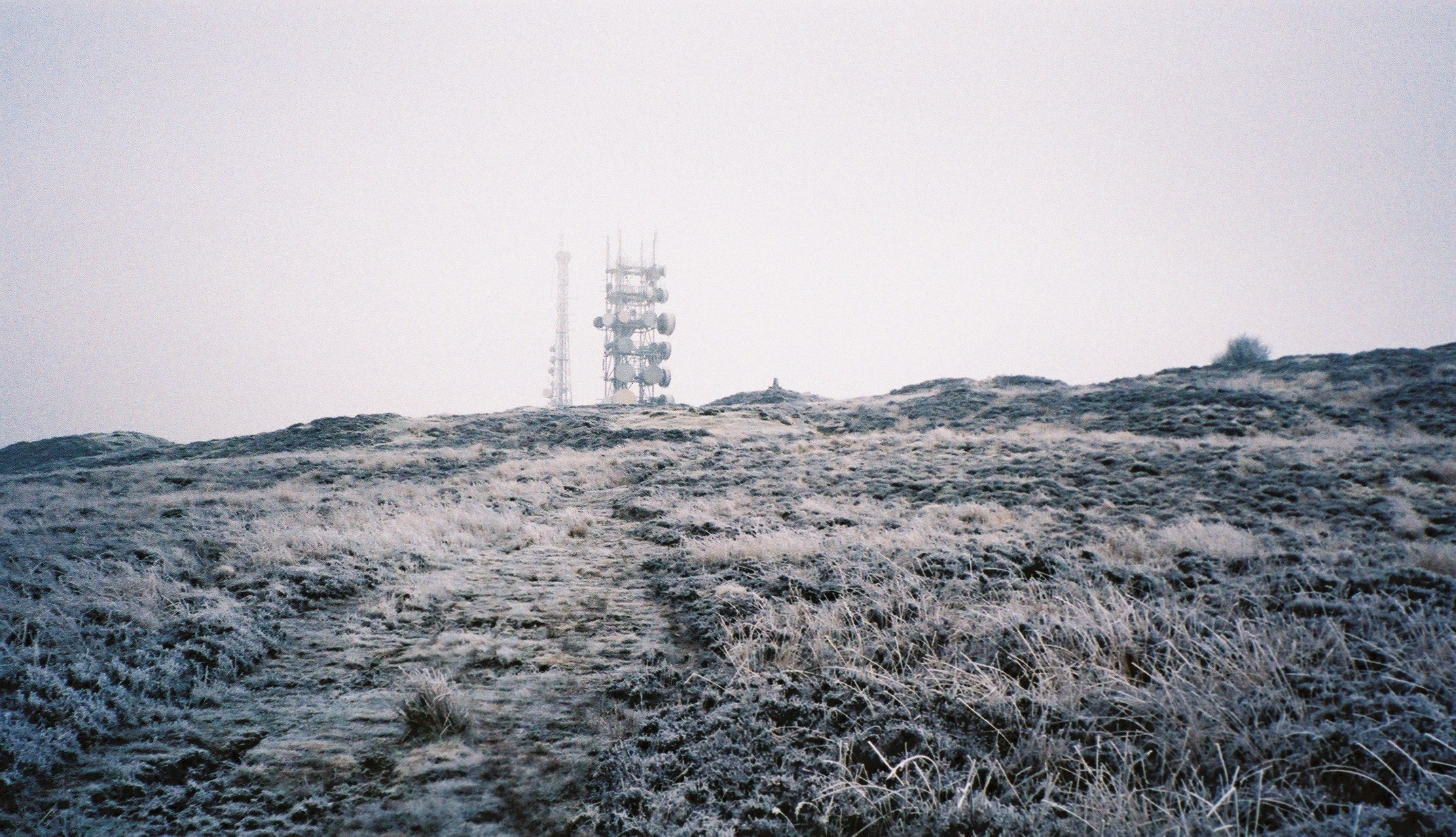
Abdon Burf, the summit of the Brown Clee in freezing conditions. The radar masts are clearly visible.

- The Clee hills are mentioned in the opening line of A. E. Housman's collection A Shropshire Lad. Poem I begins "From Clee to heaven the beacon burns".
- Titterstone Clee and Brown Clee also figure in Ellis Peters' Brother Cadfael mystery, The Virgin in the Ice.
- The Clee Hills have given rise to many place names in the area, including the villages of Cleehill, Cleeton St Mary, Cleestanton and Cleedownton.
- Unusually, Clee Hill features prominently on the Hereford Mappa Mundi - the only hill to do so

== Terminology ==
The Clee Hills often cause confusion amongst people through their names, but basically:

- The Clee Hills are the range of hills in southern Shropshire consisting of Brown Clee Hill and Titterstone Clee Hill.
- Cleehill is a small village on the southern slopes of Titterstone Clee Hill
- Titterstone Clee Hill is the smaller of the Clee Hills to the south of the range, heavily quarried.
- Brown Clee Hill is the larger of the hills to the north of the range.
- Clee Hill – rather confusingly there is actually no such thing as Clee Hill, and it is seen as either:
  - A misspelled version of Cleehill, referring to the village,
  - A local name for Titterstone Clee Hill
  - A local name for the quarrying areas on Titterstone Clee Hill
  - A local name for the area.
