= Brown Clee Hill =

Hill in Shropshire, England

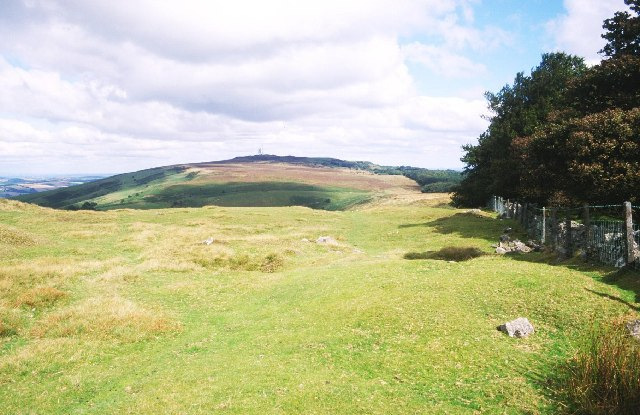
- Brown Clee Hill, looking towards Abdon Burf

Highest point
- Elevation: 540 m (1,770 ft)
- Prominence: 373 m (1,224 ft)
- Parent peak: Plynlimon
- Listing: Marilyn, County Top
- Coordinates: 52°28′30″N 2°36′02″W

Geography
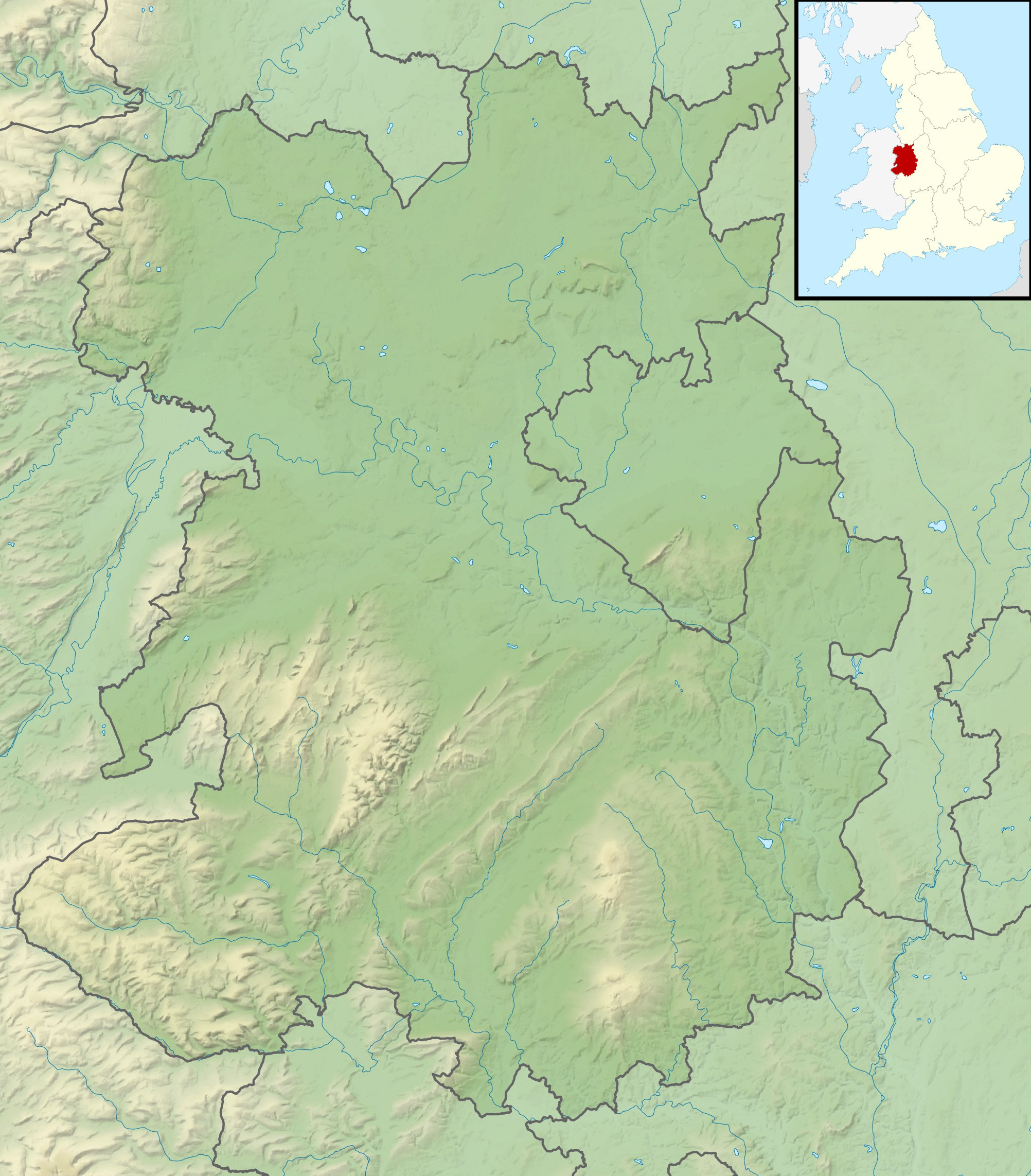
- Location within Shropshire
- Location: Shropshire, England
- OS grid: SO593865
- Topo map: OS Landranger 138

Brown Clee Hill is the highest hill in the rural English county of Shropshire, at 540 metres (1,770 ft) above sea level. It is one of the Clee Hills, and is in the Shropshire Hills Area of Outstanding Natural Beauty.

== Geography ==
Brown Clee Hill lies five miles north of its sister and neighbour, Titterstone Clee Hill. The highest peak of the hill is Abdon Burf, at 540 metres (1,770 ft) high with its shorter summit of Clee Burf being 510 metres (1,670 ft).

Much more of Brown Clee Hill is private land than on Titterstone Clee, and large areas are covered with coniferous plantations. The eastern expanse of the hill is in possession of the Burwarton Estate under ownership of Viscount Boyne, whilst the western fringes of the hill are owned by various private land owners and the parish of Clee St. Margaret.

The common land features the remains of where an Iron Age hill fort once stood (See Below).

Nearby towns are Ludlow, Cleobury Mortimer, Church Stretton, Broseley, Bridgnorth and Much Wenlock.

Several air traffic control radar masts on the summit of the hill can be seen for many miles around. They, along with the ones on top of Titterstone Clee Hill build up a picture of all the aircraft in a hundred-mile radius.

A toposcope, installed in 2006, points out local landmarks and is sited at Abdon Burf.

== Geology ==
Like Titterstone Clee to the south, Brown Clee is formed from sedimentary rocks originating during the Carboniferous period, rising above the lower ground which is underlain by older strata of Devonian, and having a capping of hardwearing igneous rock. The gentler relief of the surrounding area is characterised by the mudstones and sandstones of the St Maughans Formation. The lower slopes of the hill itself are formed by the sandstones and conglomerates of the overlying Clee Sandstone Formation, the boundary between the two sets of strata being marked by the narrow outcrop of the Upper Abdon Limestone. Together these constitute the Lower Old Red Sandstone of the area; the middle and upper 'Old Red' are absent locally. This sequence of rocks is unconformably overlain by the mudstones of the Lower and Middle Coal Measures which of course include coal seams. Atop this thickness of sedimentary rocks are the outcrops of dolerite which form the summits of both Abdon Burf and Clee Burf. A dark coloured rock, it is known locally as 'dhustone', dhu perhaps deriving from Welsh 'du' meaning 'black'. This erosion-resistant rock was intruded into the sedimentary rocks in late Carboniferous times, though all overlying strata have long since eroded away.

Extensive areas of head are mapped to the east, and to an extent to the north, of the hill.

== History ==
Several Iron Age hill forts are dotted around the Clee Hills. Nordy Bank is the last 'intact' survivor of three hill forts on Brown Clee. The other two, at Abdon Burf and Clee Burf, have been largely lost to quarrying activity. Nordy Bank occupies a sloping ridge top site and its ramparts are up to three metres (10 feet) high. It was built some time in the British Iron Age first millennium BC and gives a commanding view of the local countryside.

Quarrying dhustone was for long the main income of the area, and it was widely known as a dangerous and gruelling job, this dolerite being a very hard and challenging material to extract. People would walk to the Abdon Quarry on Brown Clee Hill from as far as Bridgnorth and Ludlow, and often they would tend to at least one other job.

The Abdon Clee quarries closed in 1936, and by this time the area had become almost industrial, with a concrete plant, tarmac plant in Ditton Priors, plus a small railway to move the stone - and the quarries themselves. If the wind was coming down over the hill it was apparently possible to hear the stone crusher at the top crunching away, even down in Cleehill village.

After the quarries closed, a lot of the quarrymen went to work at the Cockshutford quarries on the other side of Brown Clee but the dhustone there was not as good quality and durable as over on the Abdon side and that quarry failed too after a short period. Many of the men returned and worked at the naval ammunition depot set up at Ditton Priors at the start of World War II. The quarries totally finished in the 1930s and 40s.

Whilst the radar facilities of the Clee Hills protect aircraft, both hills were once a hazard to aircraft, and a memorial, unveiled on Good Friday in 1981, commemorates the 23 Allied and German airmen killed here when their planes crashed into Brown Clee during World War II, in addition to those of a Jet Provost which crashed on the hill in 1969. The first aircraft to crash into Brown Clee was a German Junkers Ju 88, on 1 April 1941. Two Wellington Bombers, a Hawker Typhoon and at least two Avro Ansons also crashed here. It is now thought that there were more wartime crashes on Brown Clee than any other hill in Britain. The engine and other parts of one of the Wellington Bombers are said to rest on the bottom of Boyne Water, Brown Clee.

Simon Evans (1895-1940), the postman writer of Cleobury Mortimer, had his ashes scattered on Abdon Burf following his death.

== Views ==
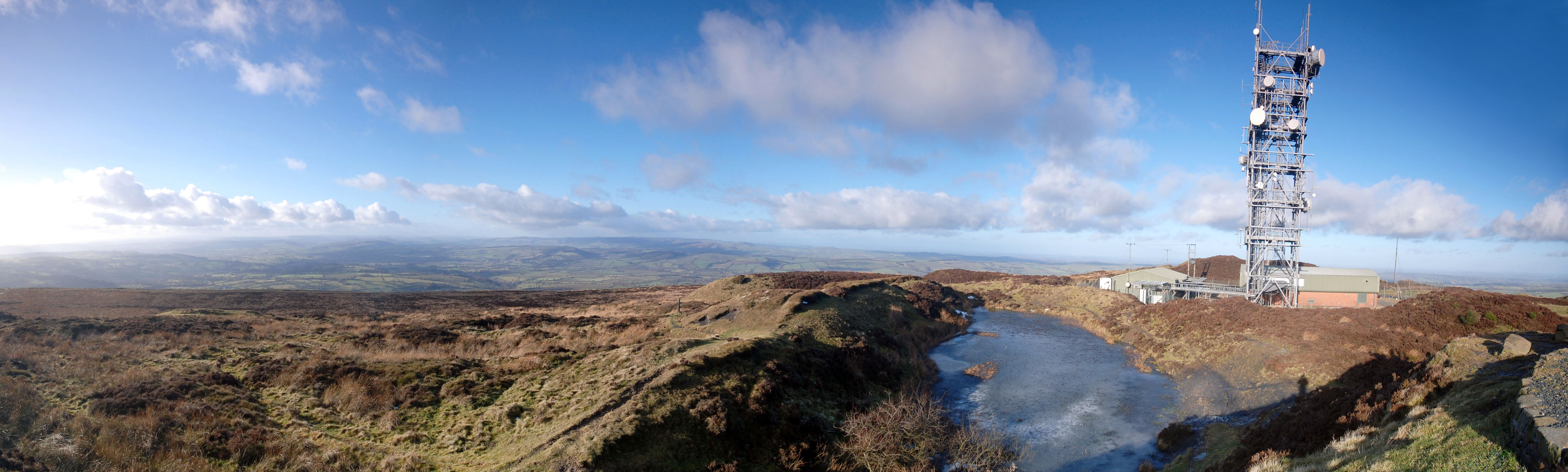
View to the west from Abdon Burf
