= A4117 road =

Road in Shropshire

Coordinates: 52.384°N 2.54°W

A4117

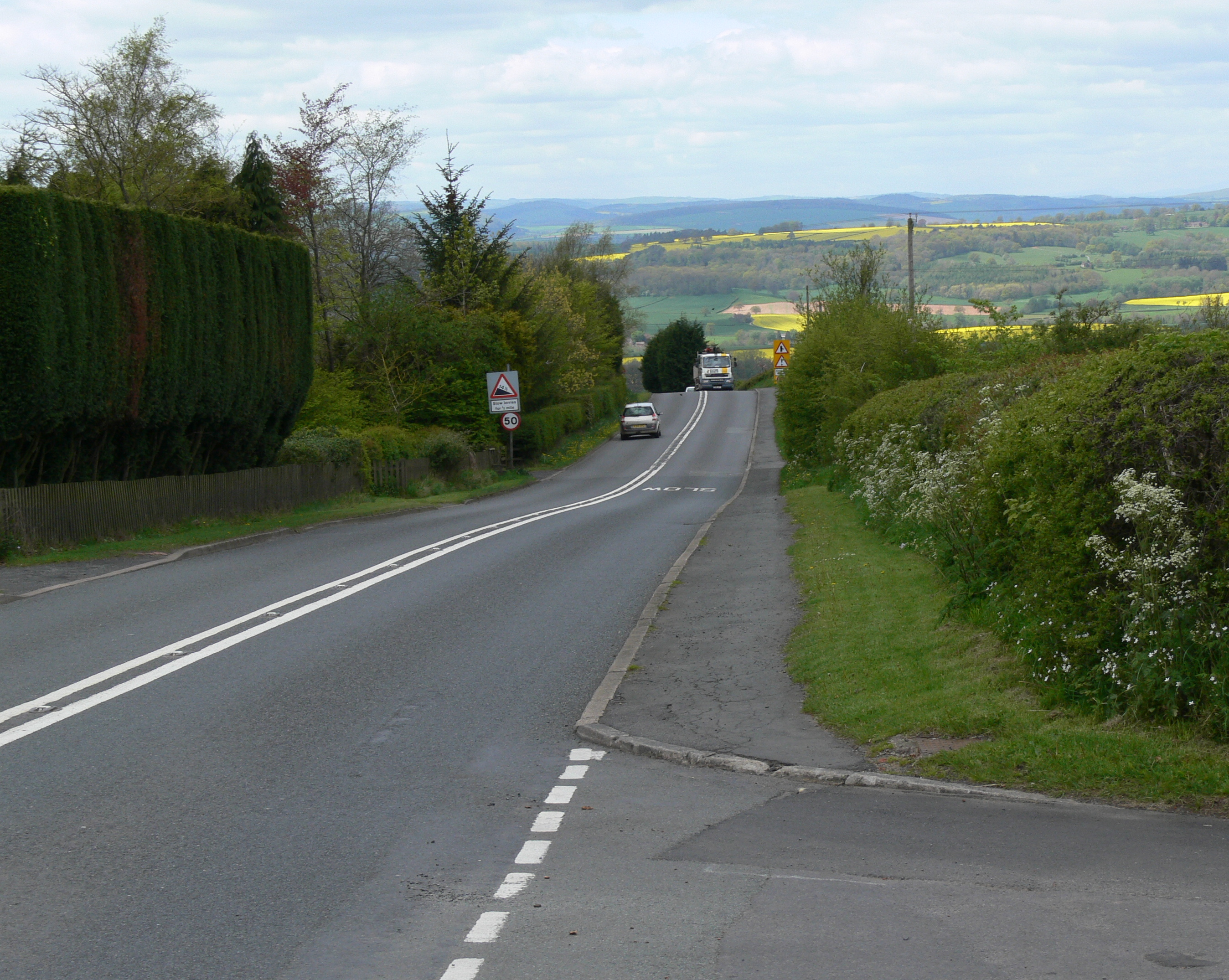
- A4117 at Angel Bank

Route information
- Maintained by Shropshire Council & Worcestershire County Council
- Length: 15.0 mi (24.1 km)
- Existed: 1927–present
- History: 1922–27 classified as the B4200; 1979 shortened by 1.0 mile (1.6 km) miles

Major junctions
- East end: A456 at Fingerpost, near Bewdley
- A456; A49
- West end: A49T at the Ludlow bypass

Location
- Country: United Kingdom
- Constituent country: England
- Primary destinations: none

Road network
- Roads in the United Kingdom; Motorways; A and B road zones
← A4115	→ A4118

The A4117 is a single-carriageway 'A road' in western England, largely in Shropshire, which passes through part of the Wyre Forest and Clee Hills.

== Route ==
It branches from the A456 2.2 miles (3.5 km) west of Bewdley, at a place called Fingerpost. Only the first 1.2 miles (1.9 km) of the route is in Worcestershire, as immediately after passing through the small village of Far Forest it passes over the Lem Brook and into Shropshire. Heading in a roughly westerly direction, it passes through Cleobury Mortimer, Hopton Wafers and Clee Hill Village. The road's destination is the town of Ludlow, where (since 1979) it ends at the Rocks Green roundabout on the A49 bypass. The route is 15.0 miles (24.1 km) long.

Notable bridges are where the road crosses the River Rea on the eastern edge of Cleobury Mortimer, the Hopton Brook at Hopton Wafers, and also the Ledwyche Brook at Henley near Ludlow.

=== B road junctions ===
The A4117 has no 'A road' junctions other than at its two ends. It has five junctions with 'B roads' however, all of which are at a terminus of the B road in question.

To the east of Cleobury Mortimer there are junctions with the B4202 road (which heads southwards into north Worcestershire), and the B4201 and B4363 roads (which head northwards into east Shropshire). Further along, the B4214 road runs from a junction with the A4117 at Cleehill, down a considerable decline to Tenbury Wells. At Henley, near the Ludlow bypass, the B4364 road from Bridgnorth joins the A4117.

=== Terrain ===
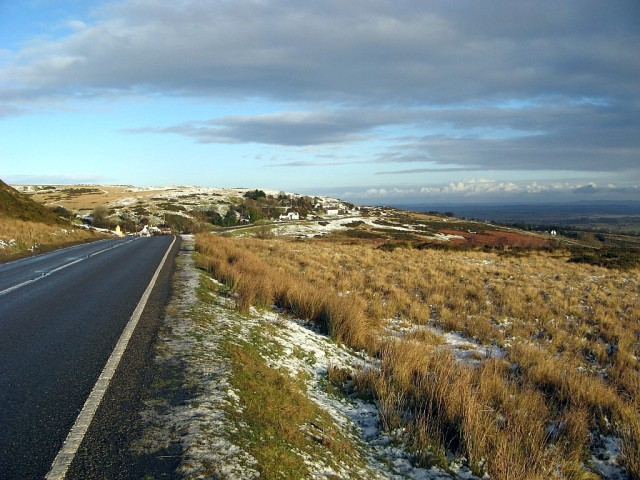
The A4117 just east of Cleehill, where the road passes through a common with grazing sheep.

The pass over the southern slopes of Titterstone Clee Hill reaches an altitude of 381 metres (1,250 ft), making the A4117 Shropshire's highest A-road (the highest classified road is the B4368 at Anchor). Because of its situation and altitude, the A4117 is often affected by snow in winter. This upland part of the route is within the Shropshire Hills AONB.

Two notable inclines are named – the stretch from Hopton Wafers to Doddington is Hopton Bank; whilst the road from Clee Hill Village down to Henley is named Angel Bank. Hopton Bank had Shropshire's last remaining emergency escape lane (a sand trap for vehicles unable to brake) towards its lower end in Hopton Wafers; this was however removed in 2014 having become obsolete.

The road passes through common land between Doddington and Clee Hill Village, and as such has cattle grids across the road to keep the openly grazing sheep within the common.

There is a public car park by the A4117 in Clee Hill Village, which affords a considerable view over the Teme valley below and further into the counties of Herefordshire and Worcestershire. At the car park is a toposcope and close by are public conveniences.

The road also passes right through the centre of the small market town of Cleobury Mortimer, which is a linear settlement along the road. This stretch is often congested.

Due to the hilly terrain and passing through the constrained streets through Cleobury Mortimer and Clee Hill Village, it is sometimes quicker (and more fuel efficient, especially for heavy goods vehicles) to take the A456 and A49 (i.e. via Woofferton) instead, if travelling between Bewdley and Ludlow; these two A roads are designated primary routes, whilst the A4117 is not.

=== Bus service ===
The 292 bus service (Ludlow-Bewdley-Kidderminster) operated by Diamond Bus, runs along the entire length of the road, providing regular public buses Monday to Saturday.

=== Garages ===
The modern route as of 2018 has three filling stations, at Mawley Oak (the B4202 junction), in Cleobury Mortimer, and at Foxwood near Doddington. Another opened in 2017 at the original junction with the former route of the A49 in Ludlow.

A Sainsbury's supermarket was constructed at the junction with the A49 in 2021 and originally an adjacent filling station was planned, but due to no interest from potential operators, as of 2024 there is a plan for a Costa Drive-thru instead.

== History ==
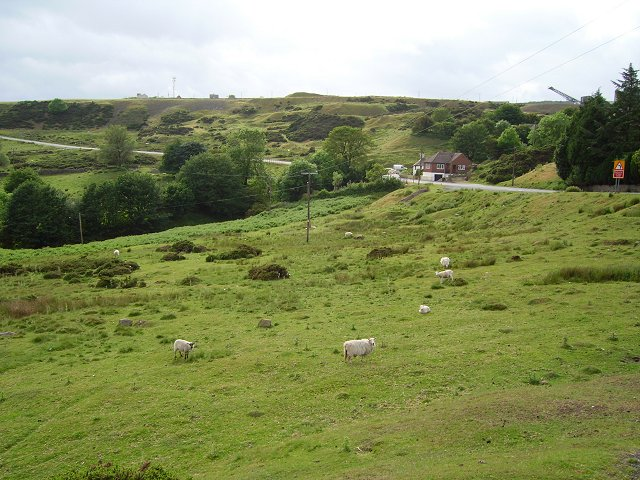
The Cornbrook Corner, between Doddington and Clee Hill Village; above can be seen quarrying operations, which use the A4117 for transporting extracted stone.

The A4117 was created in 1927. Previously the majority of the route (from Henley to Fingerpost) was the B4200, and the remainder (between the A49 in Ludlow and Henley) was part of the B4364. (These B roads having been classified only five years earlier in 1922.) The route number 'B4200' has since been re-used for a short road in Wednesbury.

Prior to the opening of the A49 Ludlow bypass in 1979, the A4117 continued into the town along Henley Road and New Road to the old A49 route (passing under the Welsh Marches railway line at the foot of New Road). The junction with the A49 was at the Bridge Inn on Corve Street until the construction of Burway Bridge in the 1950s diverted the A49, after which the A4117 ran a little further (along part of the former A49 route), crossing the historic Corve Bridge.

This 1.0 mile (1.6 km) section from the pre-bypass A49 route (which has been re-classified as the B4361) along New Road and Henley Road to the Rocks Green roundabout is no longer a classified (A or B) route, however remains a busy local route (and the 292 bus route runs the length of Henley Road).

=== Railway closures ===
The A4117 passed under the Tenbury and Bewdley Railway, which closed in 1962 to passengers and 1964 for freight, and the Cleobury Mortimer and Ditton Priors Light Railway, which finally closed in 1960, near to the former Cleobury Mortimer railway station, which was situated some distance from the town in the Wyre Forest and which was the junction of these two lines. The town, since these closures, has no railway links.

1962 saw the final closure of the railway link from Clee Hill Junction in Ludlow to the stone aggregate quarries on Clee Hill, meaning the quarrying operations there (which continue to the present-day) now rely on the A4117 road.

=== Milestones ===
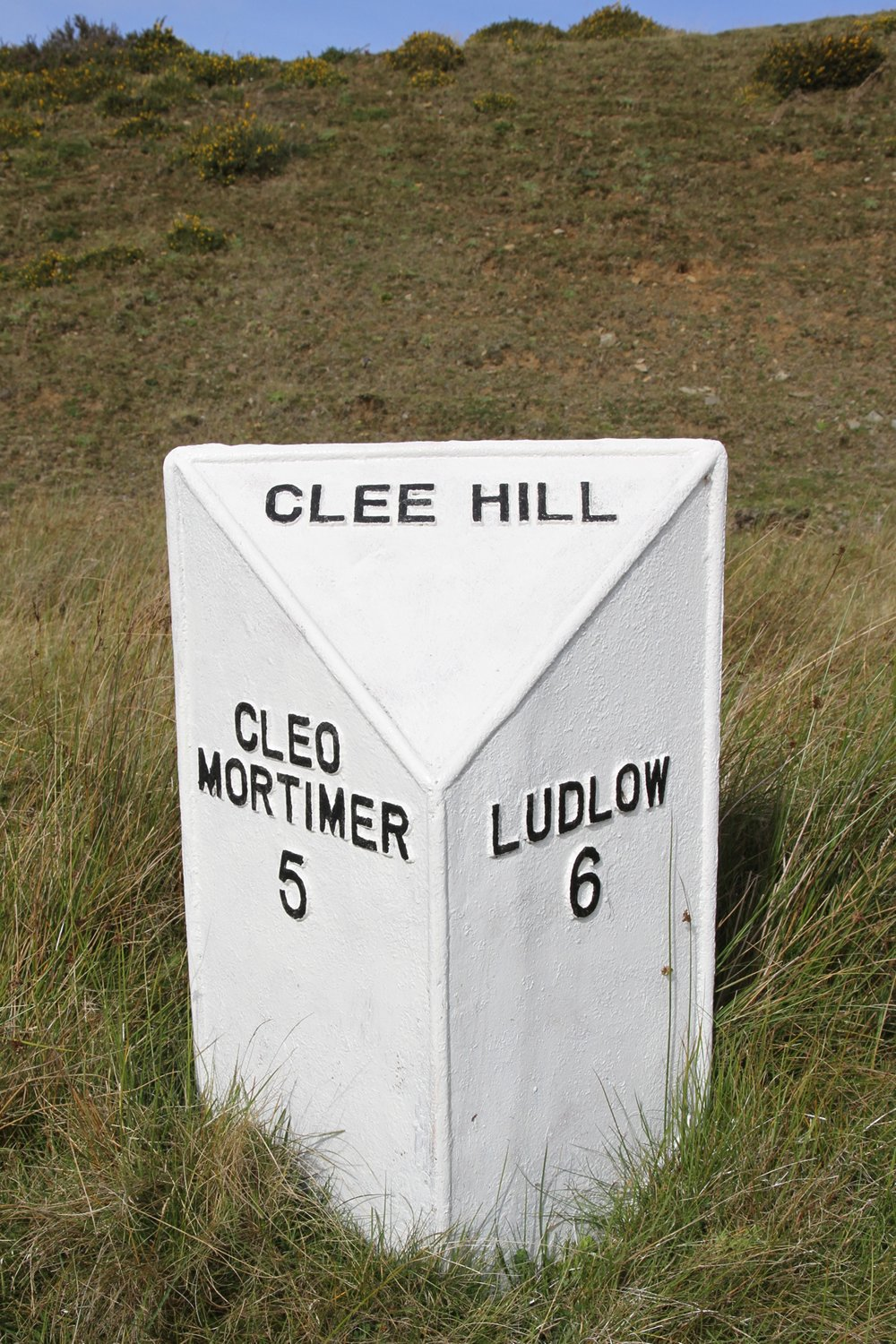
One of the historic mileposts on the route.

A number of historic milestones and mileposts (dated to the 18th and 19th centuries) continue to exist along the route; the remaining ones are in place between Far Forest and Cleobury Mortimer (marking distances to Cleobury and Bewdley) and again from Doddington to Henley (marking distances to Ludlow and Cleobury).
