= Cleehill =

Village in Shropshire, England

Coordinates: 52.374°N 2.601°W

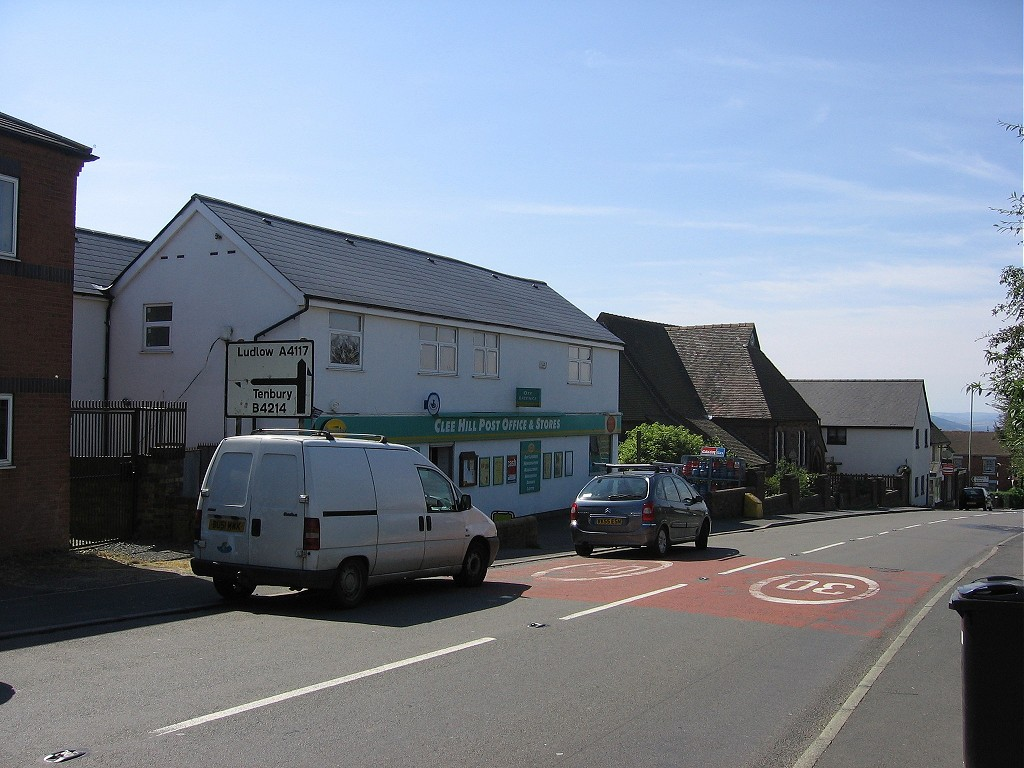
- The convenience store on the main road through Cleehill, in 2007

- Location within Shropshire
- OS grid reference: SO590753
- Civil parish: Caynham
- Unitary authority: Shropshire
- Ceremonial county: Shropshire
- Region: West Midlands
- Country: England
- Sovereign state: United Kingdom
- Post town: LUDLOW
- Postcode district: SY8
- Dialling code: 01584
- Police: West Mercia
- Fire: Shropshire
- Ambulance: West Midlands
- UK Parliament: Ludlow

Cleehill is a village in south Shropshire, England. It is sometimes written as Clee Hill Village (including on the road sign entering the village) to avoid confusion. It lies in the civil parish of Caynham. The market towns of Ludlow and Cleobury Mortimer are both 5.5 miles (8.9 km) distant, Ludlow to the west and Cleobury to the east.

It lies on the slope of Titterstone Clee Hill and, lying between 1,120 feet (340 m) and 1,250 feet (380 m) above sea level, it is one of the highest settlements in the county.

== Amenities ==
The village has Shropshire's highest school (the Clee Hill Community Primary School).

Cleehill has a pub, the Cross on the Hill (currently the highest pub in Shropshire at 1200ft/366m), a small convenience store, a café (Brewe Clee Hill) and a fish and chips take-away. Until it closed in 2015, Shropshire's highest public house, at 1,300 feet (400 m), was The Kremlin (previously the Craven Arms), located on the upper slopes of the village.

There is a public car park by the A4117, which affords a considerable view over the Teme valley below and further into the counties of Herefordshire and Worcestershire. At the car park is a toposcope and other information boards. There are also public conveniences.

== Transport ==
The A4117 runs through the village and there is a cattle grid stretching over this major thoroughfare due to the road running across common land. The road reaches an elevation of 1,250 feet (380 m) just to the east of the village, and is often affected by snow in winter. The B4214 road to Tenbury Wells starts at a junction with the A4117 in the village.

The 292 bus service (Ludlow-Cleobury-Bewdley-Kidderminster) calls at Cleehill, providing a regular service Monday to Saturday.

== Sport ==
The village has a football club called Clee Hill United, who play their home games at Knowle Sports Ground, the highest venue in the Mercian Regional Football League at an elevation of 950 feet (290 m).

== Climate ==
Although Cleehill has an oceanic climate like the rest of the U.K., it is slightly different to surrounding areas in certain months of the year and snowfall is more common in winter because of the high elevation.

Compared with the nearest Met Office weather station of Shobdon, Cleehill has colder maximum temperatures year-round, however minimum temperatures are warmer every month of the year except March and April, probably because of the reduced amount of sunshine the village receives compared to nearby areas.

Sunshine amounts are suppressed compared with nearby areas; Cleehill receives less sunshine than Shobdon in every month of the year except January.

Cleehill is also drier than surrounding areas with the exception of the months of April–July, when the village receives more rainfall. Precipitation tends to be heavier than in Shobdon, reflected in the reduced number of rainy days.

Between 1966 and 1971, the highest recorded temperature was 26.3 °C (79.3 °F) on 7 July 1970, and the lowest was −8.4 °C (16.9 °F) on 9 December 1967.

Climate data for Cleehill 360m amsl (Extremes 1966-1971)
Month	Jan	Feb	Mar	Apr	May	Jun	Jul	Aug	Sep	Oct	Nov	Dec	Year
Record high °C (°F)	9.0 (48.2)	9.6 (49.3)	15.1 (59.2)	17.0 (62.6)	20.0 (68.0)	24.4 (75.9)	26.3 (79.3)	23.3 (73.9)	19.5 (67.1)	18.7 (65.7)	12.4 (54.3)	11.7 (53.1)	26.3 (79.3)
Mean daily maximum °C (°F)	6.4 (43.5)	6.9 (44.4)	9.1 (48.4)	11.8 (53.2)	14.8 (58.6)	17.6 (63.7)	19.5 (67.1)	18.9 (66.0)	16.9 (62.4)	13.3 (55.9)	9.1 (48.4)	6.8 (44.2)	12.6 (54.7)
Daily mean °C (°F)	4.0 (39.2)	4.1 (39.4)	5.5 (41.9)	7.9 (46.2)	11.1 (52.0)	14.0 (57.2)	15.8 (60.4)	15.4 (59.7)	13.4 (56.1)	10.4 (50.7)	6.7 (44.1)	4.5 (40.1)	9.4 (48.9)
Mean daily minimum °C (°F)	1.5 (34.7)	1.2 (34.2)	2.0 (35.6)	3.8 (38.8)	6.9 (44.4)	9.9 (49.8)	11.7 (53.1)	11.7 (53.1)	9.8 (49.6)	7.4 (45.3)	4.1 (39.4)	2.1 (35.8)	6.0 (42.8)
Record low °C (°F)	−7.7 (18.1)	−6.2 (20.8)	−6.8 (19.8)	−6.0 (21.2)	−2.5 (27.5)	1.4 (34.5)	4.6 (40.3)	5.8 (42.4)	1.0 (33.8)	−1.0 (30.2)	−5.8 (21.6)	−8.4 (16.9)	−8.4 (16.9)
Average rainfall mm (inches)	63 (2.5)	50 (2.0)	54 (2.1)	60 (2.4)	68 (2.7)	68 (2.7)	65 (2.6)	60 (2.4)	58 (2.3)	70 (2.8)	69 (2.7)	65 (2.6)	750 (29.8)
Average rainy days (≥ 1.0 mm)	9	8	8	9	9	8	9	8	8	8	9	8	101
Average relative humidity (%)	87	83	80	77	76	75	74	77	79	83	87	87	80
Mean monthly sunshine hours	62.0	56.5	93.0	120.0	186.0	180.0	186.0	155.0	120.0	93.0	60.0	31.0	1,342.5
Source 1: U.K. holiday weather for sun
Source 2: en climate data

== See also ==
- Knowbury
- Angelbank
- Clee Hills#Terminology
