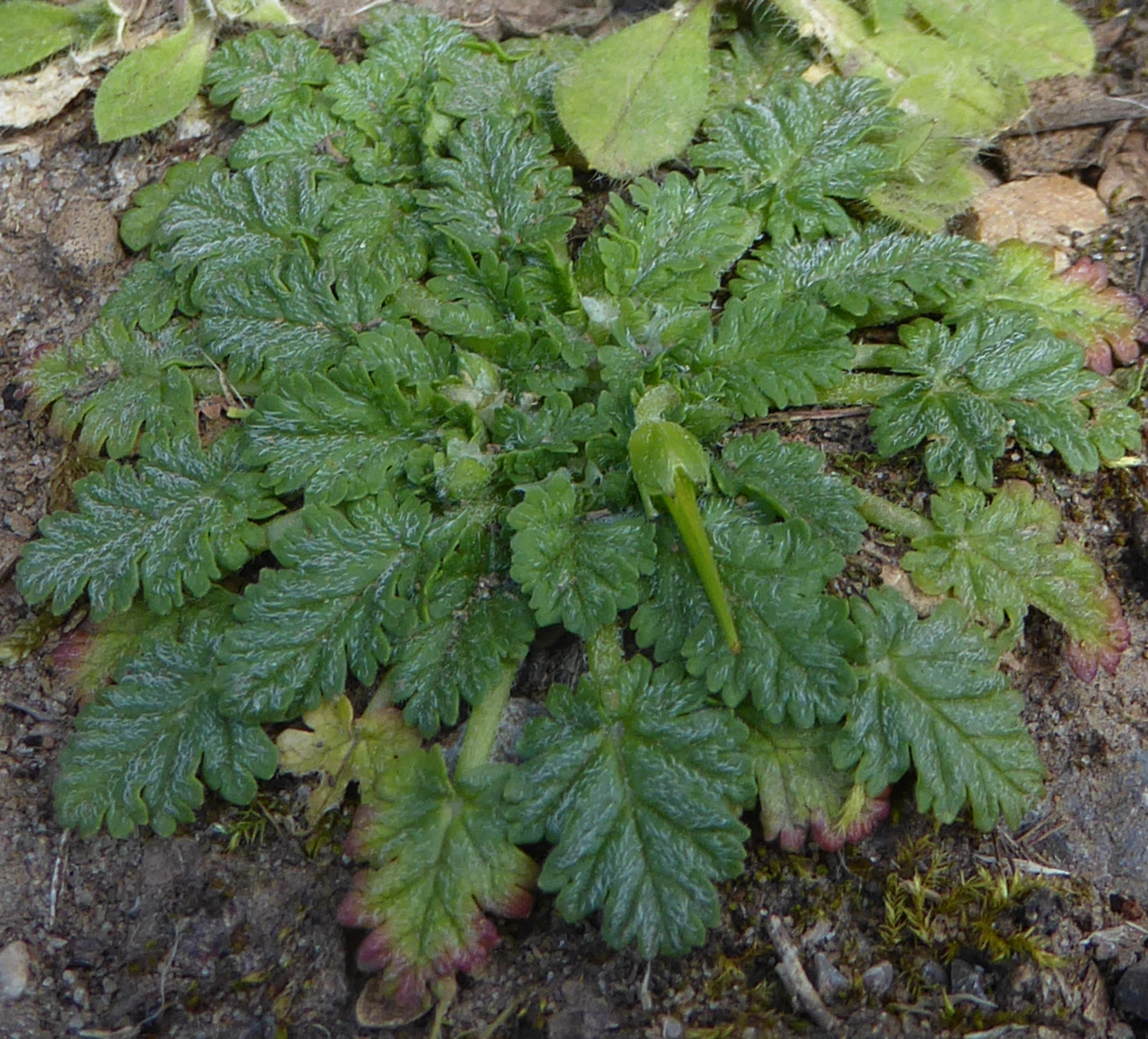

Conservation status
- Least Concern (IUCN 3.1)

Scientific classification
- Kingdom: Plantae
- Clade: Tracheophytes
- Clade: Angiosperms
- Clade: Eudicots
- Clade: Rosids
- Order: Geraniales
- Family: Geraniaceae
- Genus: Erodium
- Species: E. maritimum

Binomial name
- Erodium maritimum (L.) L'Hér.

Synonyms
- Geranium maritimum L.; Erodium bocconei Viv.; Geranium littoreum Cav.

= Erodium maritimum =

Species of flowering plant

Erodium maritimum, the sea stork's-bill, is a herbaceous perennial plant in the family Geraniaceae. It occurs on free-draining stony soils close to the sea and, very occasionally, in similar situations inland. Most of the world's population occurs in southern Britain and Brittany, but it is found in scattered locations around the coast of Europe as far as Corsica and Italy, and south to the Canary Isles.

== Description ==
Sea stork's-bill is a perennial monoecious herb which typically grows in rosettes pressed flat to the ground, with a deep tap root that allows it to survive through the summer on dry soils. The leaves are all or mostly basal, but are arranged in opposite pairs if the stem elongates. The leaves are simple, oval in outline, up to 2 cm long, shallowly lobed and quite strongly toothed, with a petiole that can be as long, or longer, than the blade. The surface of the leaf is streaked with long, white, appressed hairs.

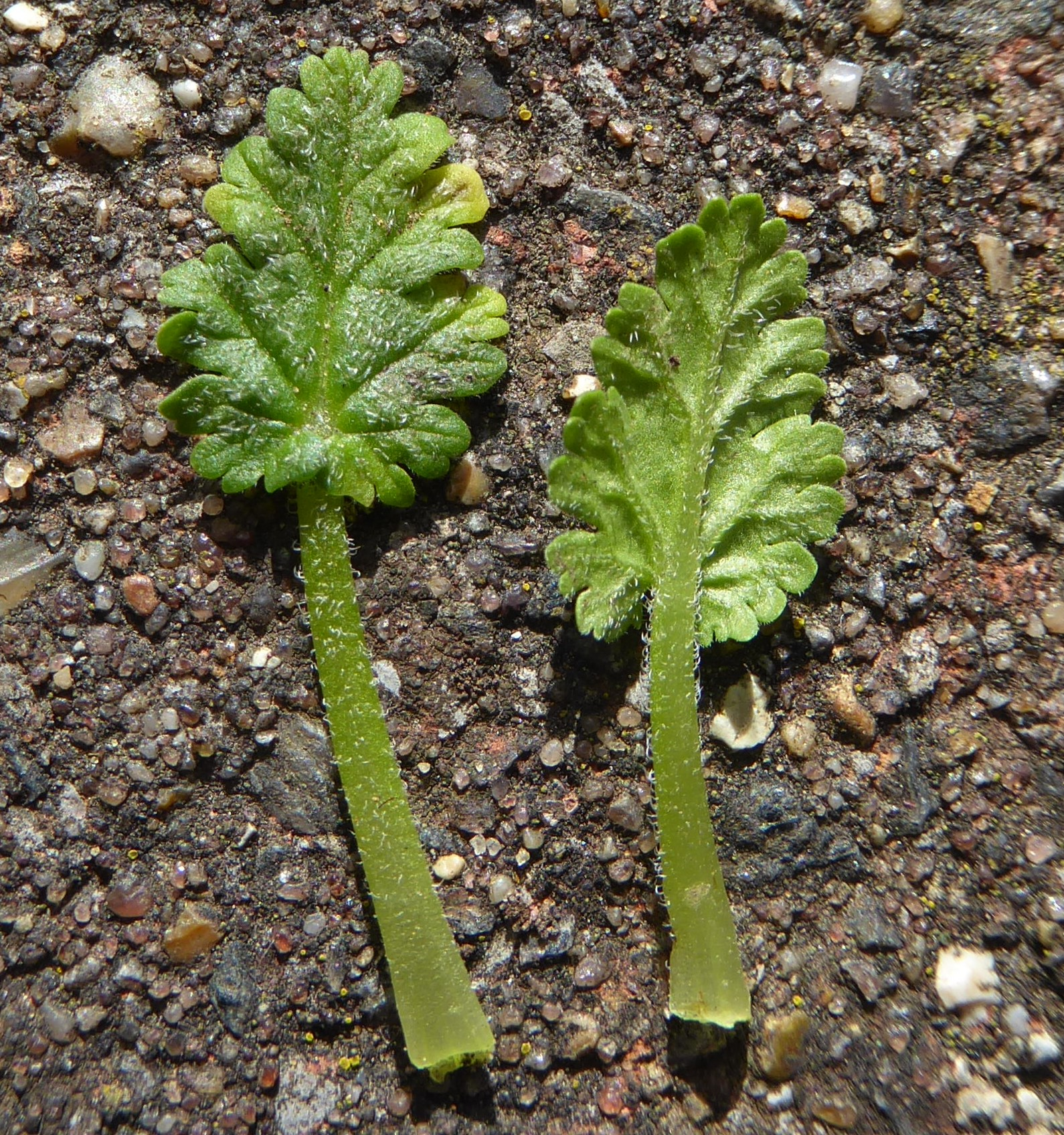
Detail of the leaves

The actinomorphic flowers are arranged singly (occasionally in pairs), arising from the middle of the rosette on short patent-hairy pedicels. The hermaphroditic flowers have five green, pointed, hairy sepals a few millimetres long and usually no petals at all, but sometimes small white petals about the same size as the sepals. If present, the petals fall soon after flowering. There are five stamens, and five carpels which develop into beaked mericarps that look like miniature storks bills, less than 1 cm long. The flowers are usually self pollinating.

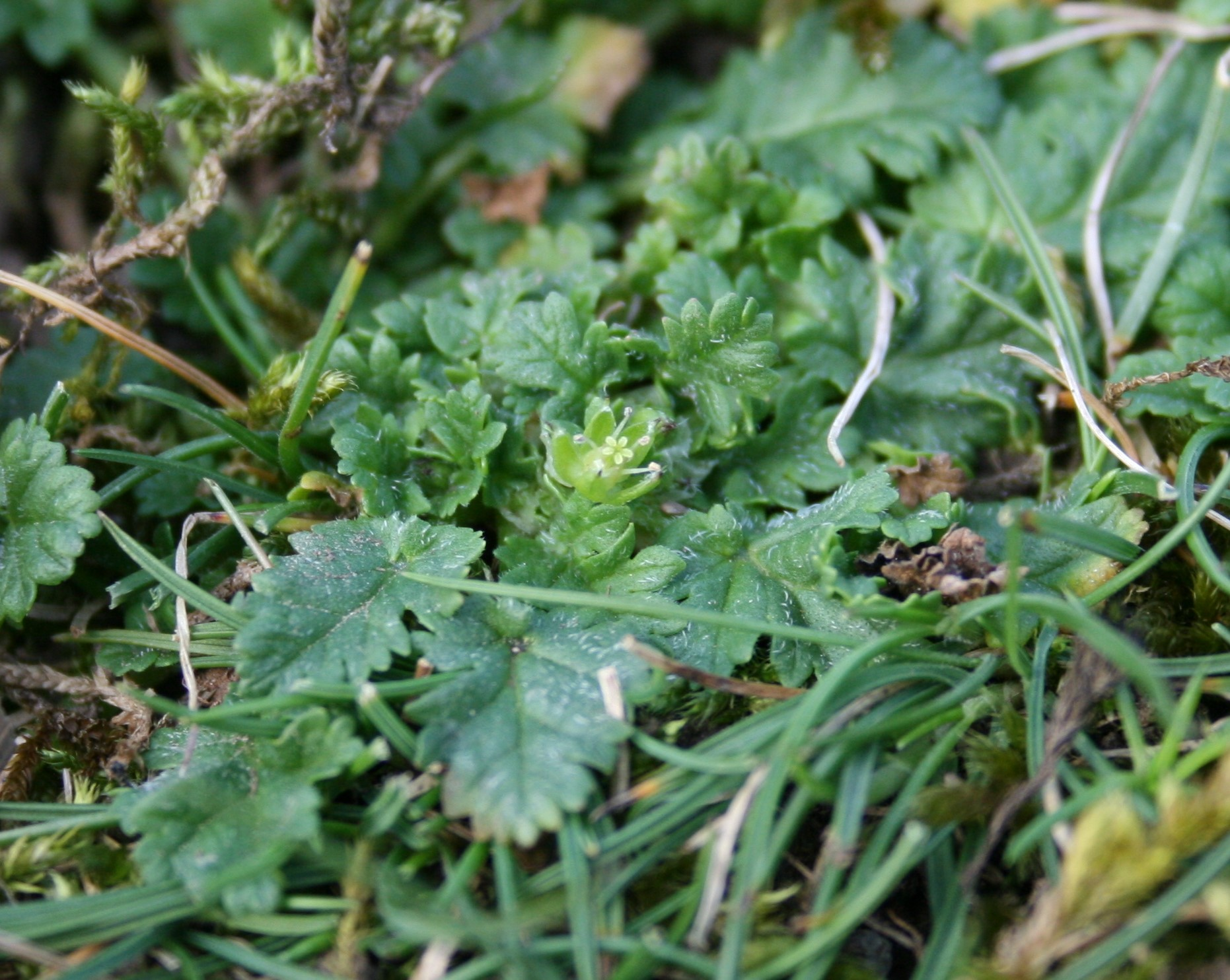
Flowering rosette of sea stork's-bill

== Identification ==
Sea stork's-bill can be separated from other stork's-bills in the areas where it grows by the division of the leaves: common stork's-bill and sticky stork's-bill are twice-pinnate, musk stork's-bill is 1-pinnate, whereas sea stork's bill has simple leaves. Soft stork's-bill and Mediterranean stork's-bill also have simple leaves but, like the other three, both have large, persistent petals, whereas sea stork's-bill usually has none.

For technical confirmation, the pit at the apex of the mericarp is hidden by long hairs in sea stork's-bill, whereas it is generally visible in the other species.

== Taxonomy ==
Erodium maritimum was originally named Geranium maritimum by Linnaeus in 1763 but, together with several other similar species, it was transferred to the genus Erodium by the French botanist Charles Louis L'Héritier de Brutelle in Hortus Kewensis in 1789, on the basis that they only have 5 stamens, rather than the 10 of Geranium. A couple of other synonyms have been created over the years (i.e. similar plants were mistakenly thought to be new species) but they have never been widely used.

Its chromosome number is 2n = 20.

There are no currently accepted subspecies or varieties, although several have been suggested in the past, and it is not known to hybridise with any other species.

A 2012 study of the genetics of sea stork's-bill found that populations on the Atlantic coast of Europe lacked diversity, and plants throughout this area were all closely related to each other, as if long-distance dispersal events were frequent. However, no obvious mechanism for this dispersal was identified. The Sardinian population appeared to have a higher level of genetic variability, suggesting that this may be the ancestral population that has migrated west and north since the last Ice Age. The low levels of diversity might be due to founder effects, whereby a small number of individuals have given rise to the entire Atlantic seaboard population.

== Distribution and status ==
Sea stork's-bill is almost entirely restricted to western Europe, where it has a very Atlantic distribution, mainly in south-western Britain, southern Ireland and Brittany. It extends to north-west Spain and the western Mediterranean to Italy. In north Africa it is found only in the Canary Islands (specifically, La Palma, Gran Canaria and Tenerife) and Tunisia (a specimen collected at Nabeul in 1884 is at the Paris Museum of Natural History) and it is known on the island of Zembra). Some sources suggest that it has been introduced to Tasmania, but a 2021 census of plants did not list it there.

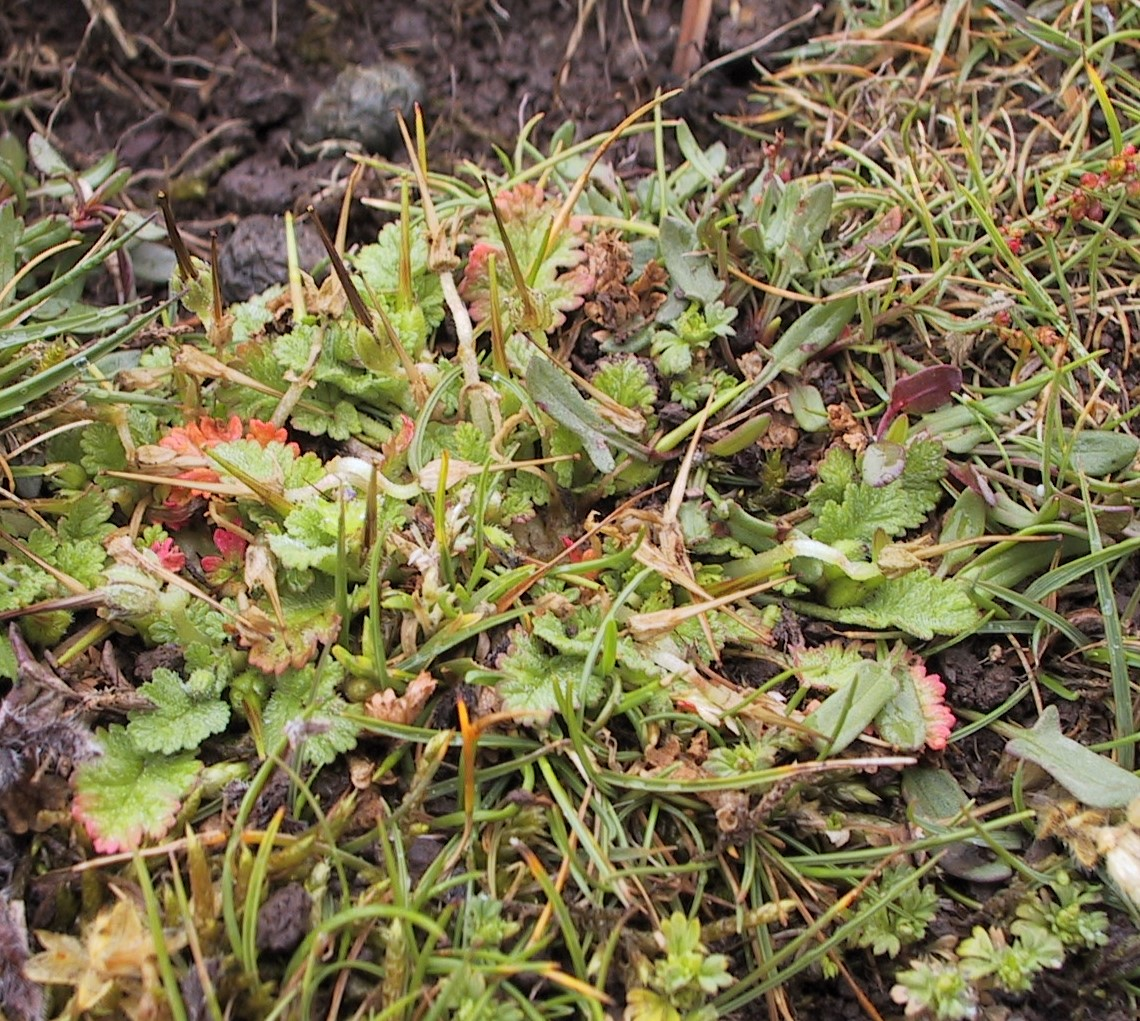
Sea stork's-bill in acid grassland on the Long Mynd

Its conservation status globally has not been assessed but in Britain, where it is most common, it is listed as LC (least concern) and it is clearly increasing in the south-east and East Anglia. Similarly, in mainland France it is generally classified as LC. It is restricted to a short stretch of coastline from the Cotentin Peninsula through Brittany to the Pays de la Loire; but it is considered VU (vulnerable) in Normandy and the Loire. The isolated population in Corsica is similarly listed as LC. By contrast it is considered to be Critically Endangered in Spain.

In some counties in Britain sea stork's-bill is considered to be an axiophyte, or species typical of valuable habitats. These are mostly the ones in the west, such as Cardiganshire, where it is found on stony slopes and screes on south-facing hillsides such as Foel y Mwnt, although it is also sometimes found in less natural places, including the station platform at Borth. Eastern counties, such as Kent, are less likely to consider it to be an axiophyte.

== Habitat and ecology ==
The native habitat of sea stork's-bill is generally on rocky, stony ground near the sea, with free-draining soil. It is mesotrophic, calcifugous and xerophilic. In Britain it is considered to have an alternative habitat in short, acid grassland in inland places, but it has disappeared from most such situations. An exception is the Long Mynd in Shropshire, where it was found over 200 years ago by the Jamaican-English botanist Mary McGhie and is still present, in U1 sheep's sorrel grassland on a south-facing shale hillside, at an altitude of 220 m above sea level. Secondary populations occasionally appear on roadsides, railway lines, walls, in quarries and car parks, but these tend not to persist. In Corsica it occurs at all altitudes, from coastal dunes to over 1,500 m inland.

Although it normally shuns alkaline soils, it is recorded as growing on limestone hills near Bristol. Where it does so is either "overlooking salt water... or in valleys that were once arms of the sea; never inland," so it may be that the saline influence is more significant than the soil type.

Its Ellenberg values in Britain are L = 9, F = 4, R = 6, N = 6, and S = 3, which supports the conclusion that it favours brightly lit places with low moisture, circumneutral acidity, moderate fertility, and high salinity.

While it is potentially a perennial, sea stork's-bill often behaves as a spring annual, becoming abundant in a wet year and sometimes disappearing above ground in a dry summer.

The only vegetation community listed for sea stork's-bill in the European Habitats System is N34 "Atlantic and Baltic soft sea cliffs", for which it is a diagnostic species. This habitat is subject to protection under the Bern Convention. It is not mentioned in the British National Vegetation Classification.

There are as yet no known associations between insects and sea stork's-bill. It is commonly self-pollinating, but ants and flies are known to visit the flowers, although this apparently does not result in an increase in seed production. Seed dispersal is thought to be facilitated by endozoochory (specifically, being eaten but not digested by rabbits) and epizoochory (carried on the fur). Although it is sometimes described as occurring in gull colonies, studies have shown no evidence that the seeds are carried by seabirds.

== History ==
The first British record (as Geranium Betonicae folio, the geranium with leaves like betony) was made around 1666 by Christopher Merret, who found it "over against Saint Vincent's Rocks... and at Bass Castle in Cornwall."
