= Norbury, Shropshire =

Coordinates: 52.529°N 2.939°W

Norbury
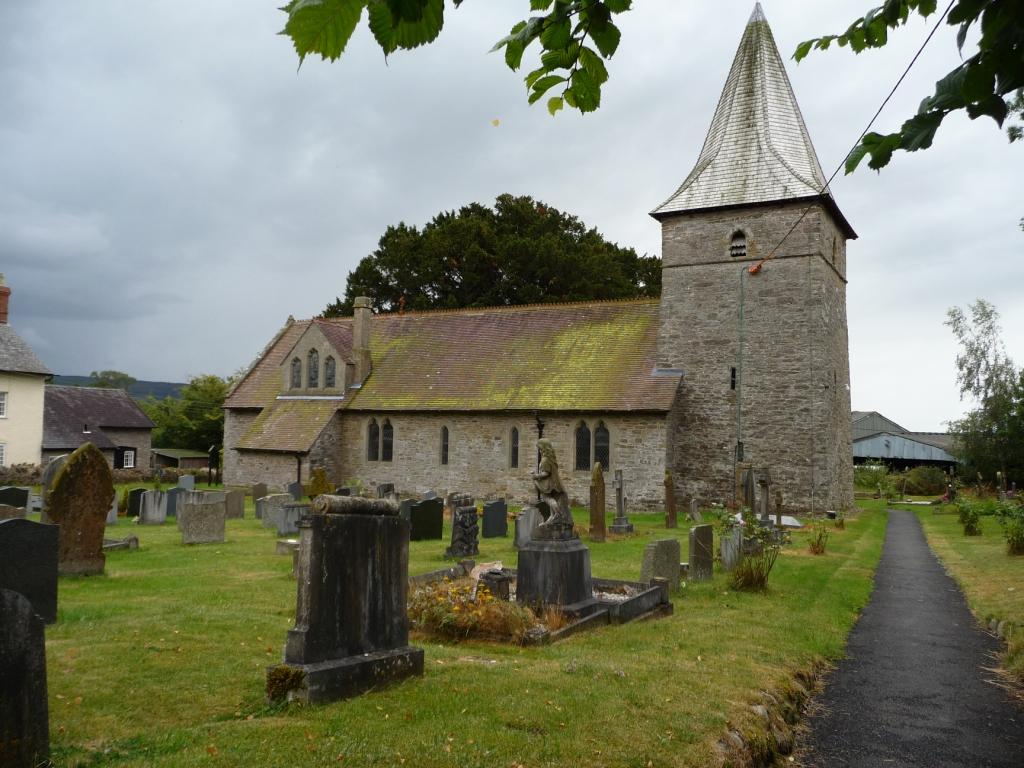
- The parish church of All Saints in Norbury

- Location within Shropshire
- Population: 136 (2011)
- OS grid reference: SO363928
- Civil parish: Norbury
- Unitary authority: Shropshire
- Ceremonial county: Shropshire
- Region: West Midlands
- Country: England
- Sovereign state: United Kingdom
- Post town: Bishops Castle
- Postcode district: SY9
- Dialling code: 01588
- Police: West Mercia
- Fire: Shropshire
- Ambulance: West Midlands
- UK Parliament: Ludlow

Norbury (/norð burh/) is a small village and civil parish in Shropshire, England. It lies to the west of the Long Mynd and the nearest town is Bishop's Castle. The parish is made up of three townships Asterton, Whitcott and Hardwick. There is a parish church dedicated to All Saints and a Country House B&B called The Coach House.

In the 1870s Norbury was described as: a township, a parish, and a sub-district, in Clun district, Salop. The township lies 2½ miles W of the Long-Mynd, 2½ E of the boundary with Wales, and 4¼ N E of Bishops-Castle r[ailway]. station. The parish contains also the townships of Asterton, Whitcott, and Hardwick; and its post town is Bishops-Castle, Shropshire. Acres, 4,584. Rated property, £2,570. Pop[ulation]., 412. Houses, 81. The property is much subdivided. The living is a p[erpetual]. curacy, annexed to the vicarage of North Lydbury, in the diocese of Hereford. The church is ancient; and there is a Primitive Methodist chapel.—The sub-district contains also four other parishes. Acres, 21,282. Pop[ulation]., 1,636. Houses, 316.

== History ==
Norbury is a chapelry of Lydbury North Ancient Parish in Shropshire. The name Norbury can be interpreted in Anglo-Saxon to mean 'North fortification', this is due to the hill fort defences that are situated nearby and the fact that Norbury is tucked away in the bucolic Onny Valley.

Over time the boundaries of the parish have not changed; however, the parish is separated into two-halves due to the boundaries of Wentnor parish. Norbury parish is made up of three townships, Asterton, Whitcott and Hardwick. There are two identified types of non-Church of England denominations in Norbury Primitive Methodist and Wesleyan Methodist.

In 1870 Asterton was described as: "a township in Norbury parish, Salop; on Long Mynd hills, 4½ miles SW of Church-Stretton. Pop[ulation]., 164." Asterton is commonly known for farming hence the name Asterton meaning 'Eastern home farm'. There is a Primitive Methodist church which was built in 1839. Church records show that in 1851 55 people attended the service. Today, the primitive Methodist church is derelict and is believed to have closed in the late 1950s.

Whitcott is described as: "a township in the parish of Norbury, county Salop, 3 miles N.E. of Bishop's Castle. It is joined with Hardwick."

Hardwick is the third township of Norbury parish. Hardwick was described as "a township in the parish of Norbury, county Salop, 3 miles N.E. of Bishop's Castle. It is situated on the Onny, and is joined to Whitcott to form a township". Records for Norbury parish date back to 1560.

In 1961 Mr George Foxall started to produce map records containing the field names and land usage in Norbury parish. These records are based on historical records and maps drawn up in 1846 and all records are held in the Shropshire Archives. These maps indicate what the land in Norbury parish was used for and who owned it.

Until 1894 Norbury was a dependent chapelry of Lydbury North. Records from 1521 indicate that the church was dedicated to St Ethelbert. The original church was built c 1200 and was rebuilt in 1723. The parish church of All Saints was predominantly built in the late 19th century. In 1880–1892 the nave, chancel and spire were built by Henry Curzon. The church's west tower dates from the 14th century.

The village was struck by an F1/T2 tornado on 23 November 1981, as part of the record-breaking nationwide tornado outbreak on that day. The Norbury tornado was the longest-lived tornado of the entire outbreak, staying on the ground for over 35 miles as it moved north-eastwards across Shropshire, dissipating after passing through the town of Whitchurch in the north of the county.

== Present day ==
Today in Norbury the Church of England parish church of All Saints is still open and holding services. There is a morning prayer every Wednesday morning and holy communion and prayers on Saturday and Sunday. This shows that there is still a high demand and usage of the church unlike the primitive Methodist church in Asterton.

The village shop is in Wentnor parish and is 1/3-mile away. Although there are not any shops in the parish itself there are two busy high-streets in the neighbouring towns Clun and Bishops castle.

On the outskirts of the parish is Norbury primary school and nursery which was founded in 1874 by Mrs Addyes Scott. The nearest secondary school is situated in Bishops Castle. In 2013 Norbury primary school was classified as good by Ofsted and has maintained its status since their visit in 2010.

There are two luxury hotels, The Coach House and the Walkmill. The Walkmill consists of Walkmill House and Lodge. Walkmill house is a traditional stone-built cottage set along the River Onny. The Coach House, previously known as the Sun Inn, was built in the 1700s. It is situated opposite All Saints church and has 6 bedrooms. The Coach House serves their guests locally grown and sourced food.

Whilst farming has decreased since 1831, it is still a prominent industry. There are still several farms in Norbury, using the flat land at the bottom of the valley. Although there are not many events in Norbury people are attracted into the area due to events occurring in the neighbouring towns or parishes. People are also attracted to the beautiful landscape the Onny Valley has to offer. Many tourists come to Norbury to do cycling or walking routes, photo walks or to enjoy one of many fete and fairs.

== Population ==
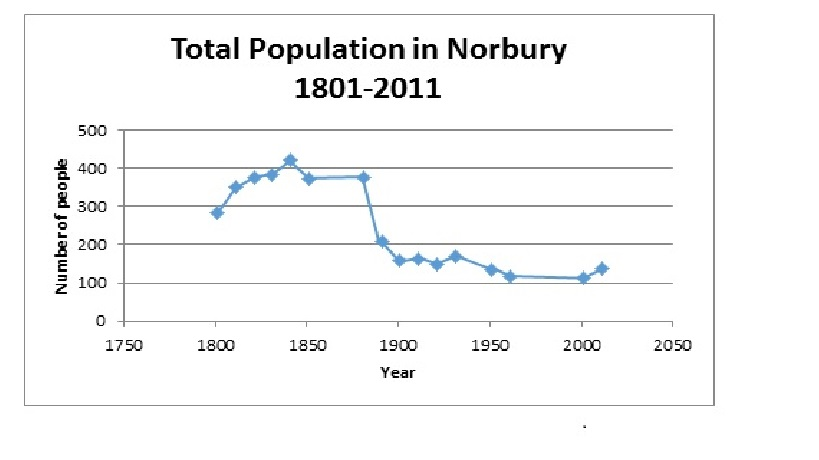
Total population of Norbury, Shropshire according to the census of population between 1801 and 2011

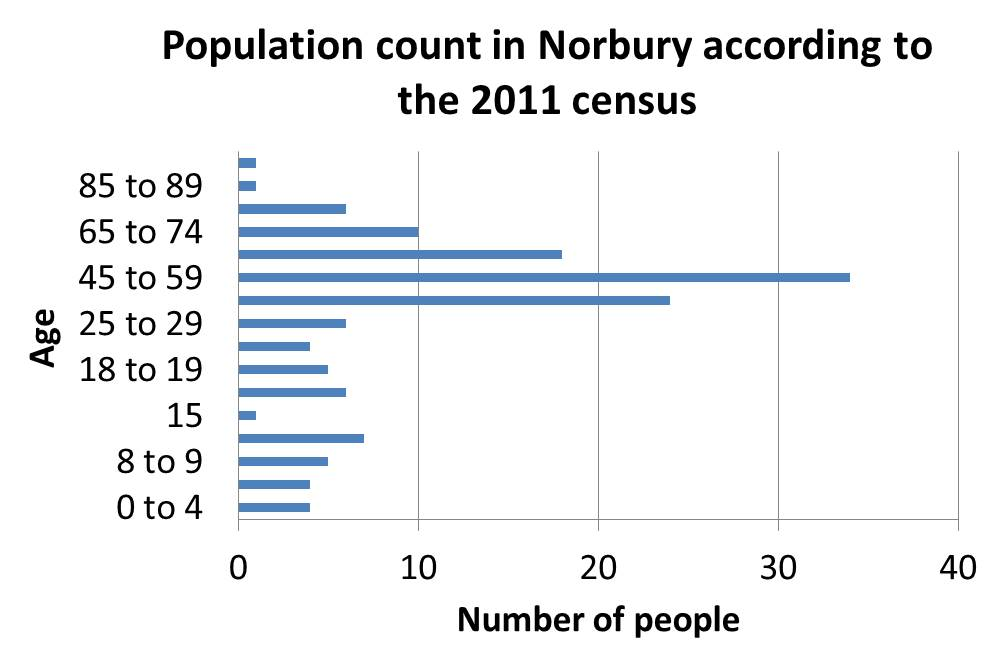
This graph shows the population of Norbury

The first census data recorded for Norbury was in 1801. The 1801 census data shows that there was a population of 281 people living in Norbury parish. This figure grew at a constant rate for the next four decades until 1841 where it reached its highest recorded population of 420. Since 1841 the population decreased to the lowest on record of 117 in 1962. The 2011 census has shown a slight increase in population, as data shows that the parish currently has a population of 136.

According to 2011 census data the majority of Norbuy's population is between the ages of 30 and 59. This highlights where there was an increase in population as a high percentage of the population is middle aged. With a low population between the ages of 20 and 29 the census data implies that young people are moving out of the area thus the people working in Norbury are more likely to be middle aged. This is explains why Norbury has a low population of under 15's.

The pie chart shows the occupation count for both females and males in Norbury according to 2011 census data

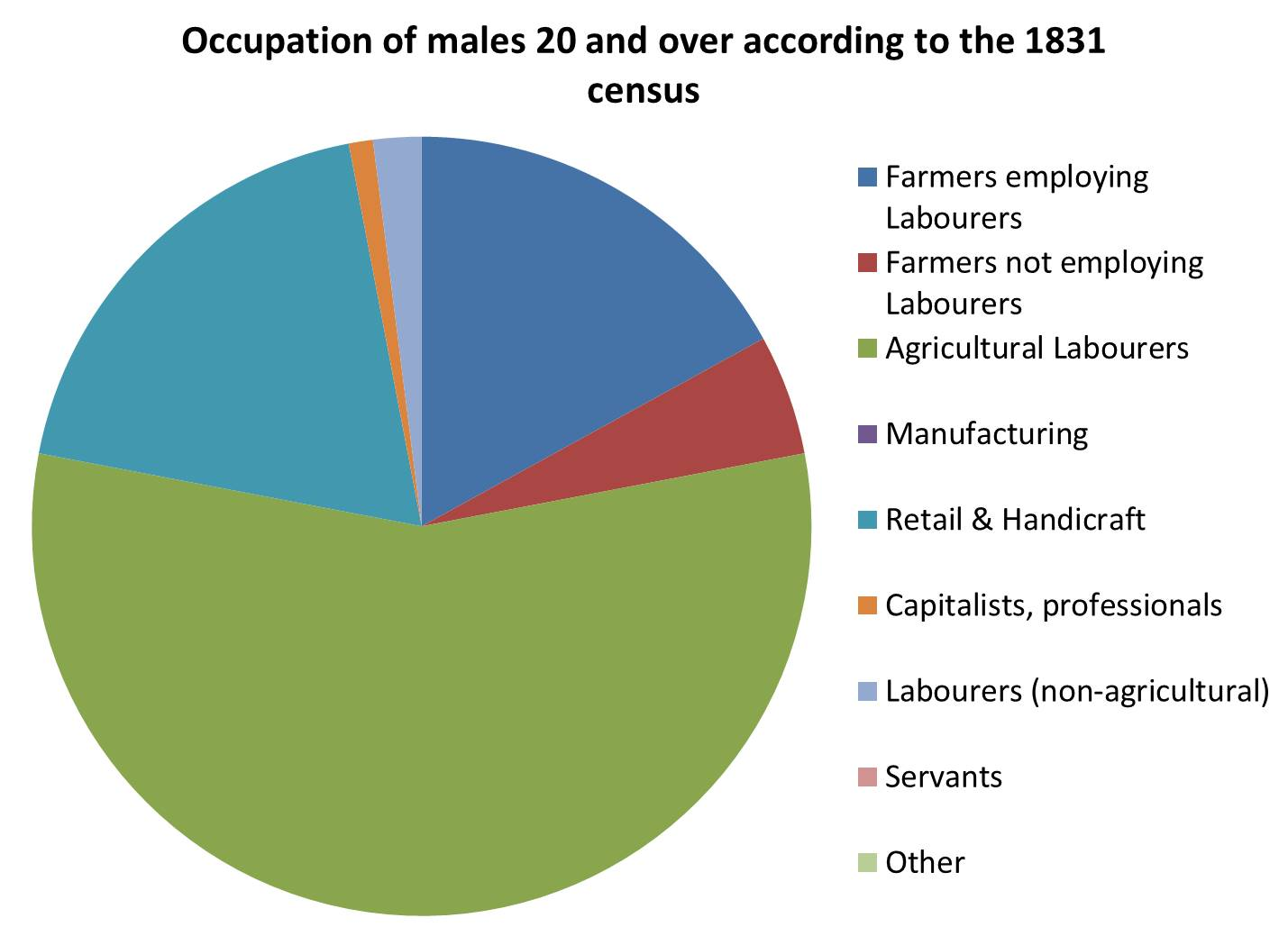
The pie chart shows male occupation in Norbury

== Occupation ==
The 1831 census data looking at the occupation of males aged 20 and over highlights the top nine occupations in that period. In Norbury at this time agricultural labourer was the most common occupation. This helps to explain why there is a lot of farmland in Asterton. This data shows that farming was the main industry in Norbury. The data also indicates that not many people in Norbury were educated as the number of skilled professionals was extremely low. In Norbury today farming is not as common. The 2011 census data shows that there has been an increase in education as the majority of people have skilled occupations. A high 31.5% of Norbury's population works in skilled trade. 1881 statistics show that the main industry for men was agricultural work with 261 people working in the industry. The data also shows that very few women worked; 260 women had no known employment. In 1881 the most common industry for women was domestic servants.

== See also ==
- Listed buildings in Norbury, Shropshire
