= Bury Ditches =

Iron Age hillfort in Shropshire, England

Coordinates: 52°26′49″N 2°59′27″W

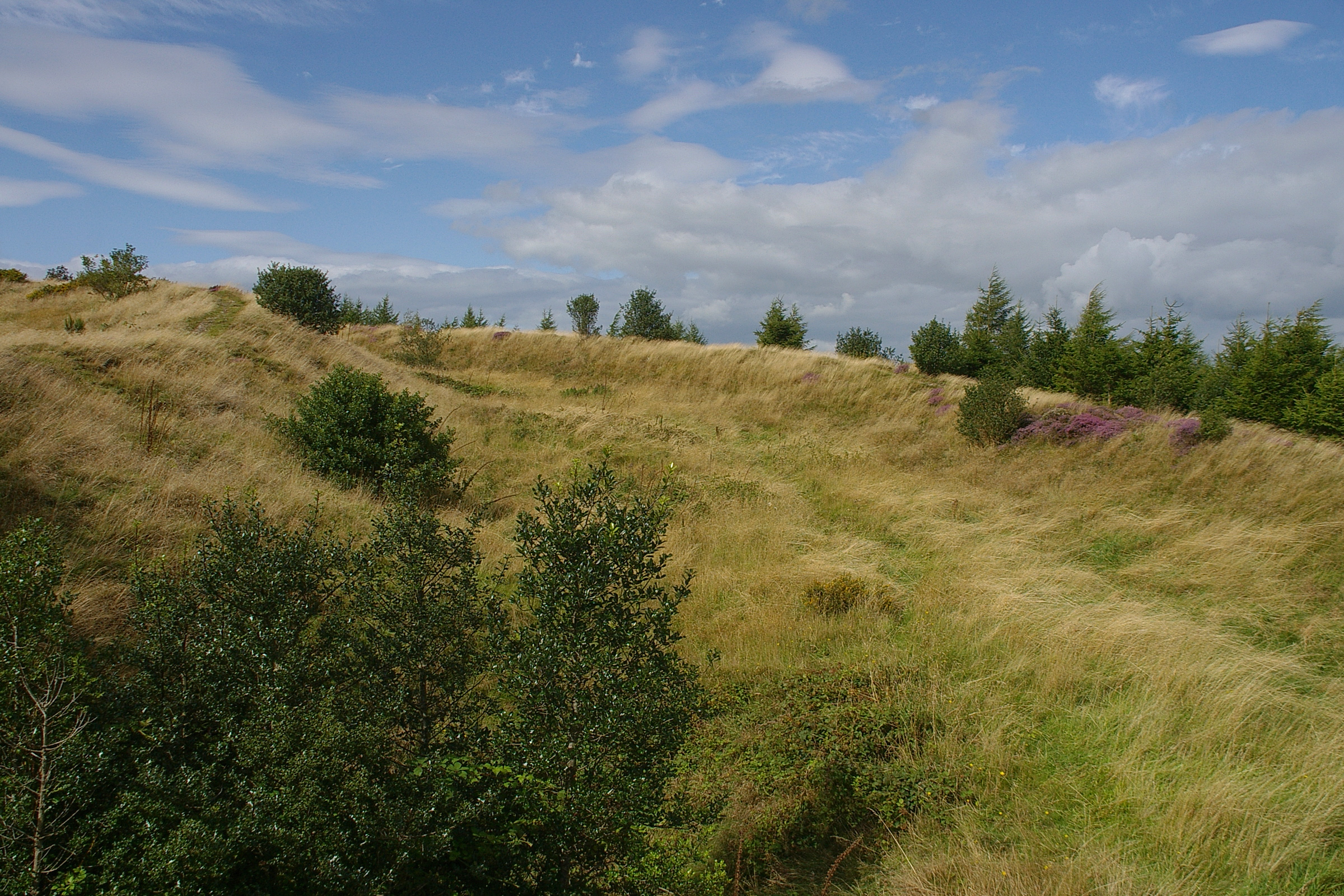
View of Bury Ditches Hill Fort.

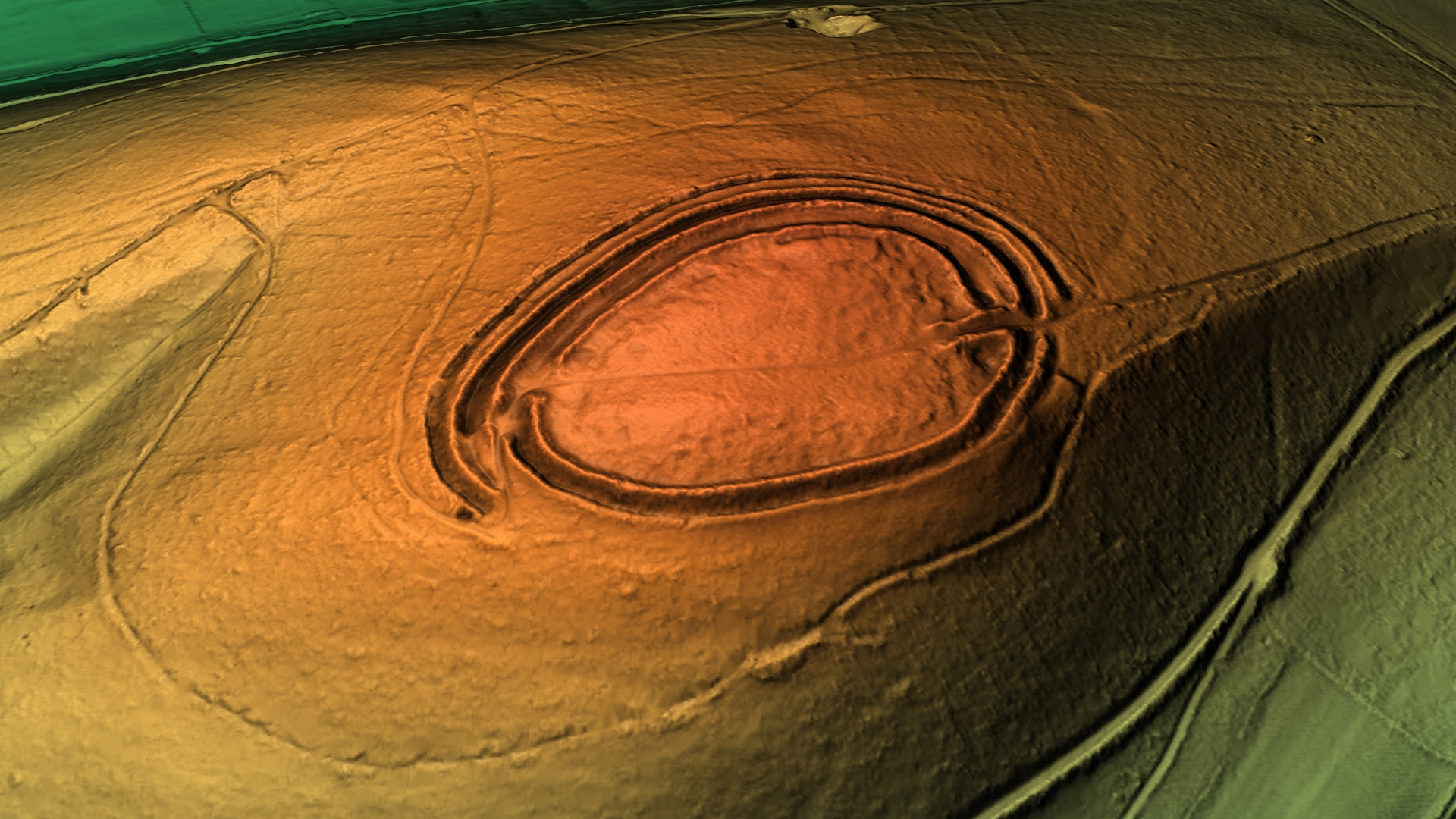
3D view of the digital terrain model

Bury Ditches is a British Iron Age hill fort between Clun and Bishop's Castle in the Shropshire Hills of central England.

== Site ==
The site is managed by Forestry England. Storms in the 1970s and 1980s led to the removal of woodland from the hill fort site on the crown of the hill, from which today the views are open in all directions.

There is a car park within an easy uphill walk of the summit.

== Description ==
Bury Ditches is often rated as a spectacular example of a surviving hill fort as it forms a neat oval or elliptical shape and is situated on the crown of a hill called Sunnyhill and comprises up to four multi-vallate ditches and rampart banks as part of its defensive earthworks and two well preserved entrance ways.

From the summit views are clear to the Long Mynd, Corndon Hill and other Shropshire Hills.

Waymarked walks cross the site and pass through the woodlands below. The Shropshire Way and Jack Mytton Way pass below the site and Wild Edric's Way crosses adjacent to it also.
