= Wild Edric's Way =

Long-distance footpath in Shropshire, England

Coordinates: 52°35′0″N 2°56′3″W

A post on Wild Edric's Way also with waymarks for Offa's Dyke Path and the Shropshire Way

Wild Edric's Way is a waymarked long distance footpath running wholly within the county of Shropshire in England. The path runs for 49 miles (79 km), mostly sharing the route of the Shropshire Way.

== The route ==
The route runs from Church Stretton in the Shropshire Hills AONB to Ludlow. It is named for Eadric the Wild.

From Stretton it climbs up the Long Mynd, and Stiperstones descending to Bishops Castle using both a medieval drovers' road, the Portway and Offa's Dyke Path to reach quiet Clun and Norman Clun Castle before traversing the Iron Age hillfort at Bury Ditches and heading to Craven Arms and finally Ludlow, the centre of the Welsh Marches.
