= Prolley Moor =

Coordinates: 52.530°N 2.895°W

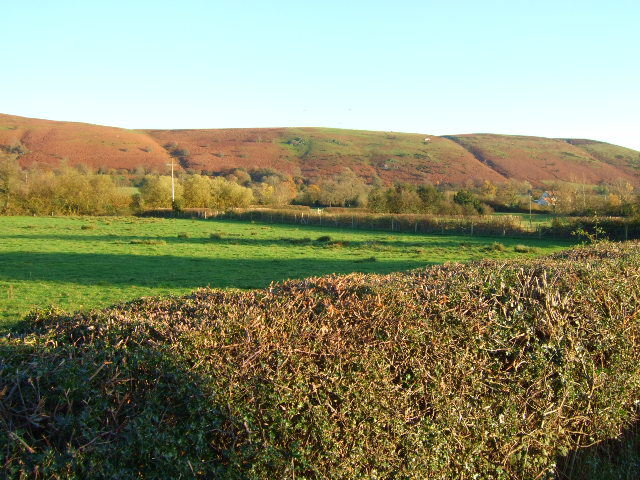
- Farmland at Prolley Moor

- Location within Shropshire
- Population: 50
- OS grid reference: SO392928
- Civil parish: Wentnor; Myndtown
- Unitary authority: Shropshire
- Ceremonial county: Shropshire
- Region: West Midlands
- Country: England
- Sovereign state: United Kingdom
- Post town: BISHOPS CASTLE
- Postcode district: SY9
- Dialling code: 01588
- Police: West Mercia
- Fire: Shropshire
- Ambulance: West Midlands
- UK Parliament: Ludlow

Prolley Moor (also known as Prolly Moor) is a sparsely populated moorland area in Shropshire, England. It is located east and north respectively of the villages of Wentnor and Asterton. It is bisected by a minor road into a northern section, known as Wentnor Prolley Moor, and a southern section, known as Asterton Prolley Moor.

It is part of the Shropshire Hills National Landscape and features in suggested walks where bird types such as Red Kite and Curlew may be observed.

There is an ancient monument known as Robury Ring on Wentnor Prolley Moor, featuring earthworks and buried remains of a small enclosed settlement which is either Iron Age or Romano-British in origin.
