= Listed buildings in Norbury, Shropshire =

Norbury is a civil parish in Shropshire, England. It contains eleven listed buildings that are recorded in the National Heritage List for England. Of these, two are at Grade II*, the middle of the three grades, and the others are at Grade II, the lowest grade. The parish contains the village of Norbury and the surrounding countryside. The oldest of the listed buildings are a church and a manor house. Most of the other listed buildings are cottages, and the rest consist of a farmhouse and farm buildings, and two milestones.

== Key ==
| Grade | Criteria |
|---|---|
| II* | Particularly important buildings of more than special interest |
| II | Buildings of national importance and special interest |

== Buildings ==
| Name and location | Photograph | Date | Notes | Grade |
|---|---|---|---|---|
| All Saints Church; 52.52967°N 2.93901°W | | Late 13th century | The earliest part of the church is the tower, the spire was added and the nave largely rebuilt in 1879–80, and the chancel was added in 1892–93. The church is built in stone with a tile roof, and consists of a nave and chancel in one cell, a south porch, a north organ chamber, and a west tower. The tower has thick battered walls, it contains narrow slits, and has an oak-shingled broach spire with a weathercock. The windows are lancets, and the east window is a triple lancet. | II* |
| Hardwick Hall; 52.50982°N 2.93114°W | | 14th or 15th century | A manor house that has been extended and altered on a number of occasions, it is timber framed, the earliest part with cruck construction, the infill is with brick, it is partly roughcast, partly encased in limestone, and has slate roofs. The plan is irregular, the earliest part being the southwest range, which has one storey and an attic, and inside are three full cruck trusses. In the late 16th century a timber framed porch was added; this has a jettied gable with a moulded bressumer. The later parts consist of two parallel ranges with three storeys. The windows are a mix of casements and sashes. | II* |
| Dale Cottage; 52.53003°N 2.93876°W | — | 16th century (probable) | The cottage is timber framed on a stone plinth and has a tile roof. There is one storey and an attic, and an outshut at the rear. The windows are casements, and there are two gabled dormers. | II |
| Smithy Cottage; 52.51917°N 2.91849°W | — | Late 18th century (probable) | A cottage and smithy that was later extended, it is in limestone with a slate roof. The cottage has two storeys and four bays, to the right is the single-storey smithy, and to the left is a single-storey 19th-century extension. The windows are casements. | II |
| Walkmill; 52.52982°N 2.91701°W | — | Late 18th century (probable) | A limestone cottage with a slate roof that was extended in the 19th century. It has two storeys, a main range and a later wing at right angles to the rear at the left end. The windows are casements. | II |
| Clapper Farmhouse and farm buildings 52.54013°N 2.94512°W | — | Early to mid 19th century | The farmhouse is in limestone and conglomerate and has a slate roof. There are two storeys, three bays, and a lean-to at the rear. The windows are casements with Gothic glazing. To the west is a two-bay cowhouse with a loft over the right bay, and to the south is a cowshed. | II |
| Bank Cottage; 52.52968°N 2.93754°W | — | Mid 19th century | A limestone cottage with a slate roof, it has two storeys, two bays, and a later gabled extension to the left. The windows are casements with Gothic glazing. | II |
| Sunville and Sunbank Cottage; 52.52968°N 2.93736°W | — | Mid 19th century | A pair of limestone cottages that were later altered and extended. They have two storeys, three bays, and a later rear range in red brick. The windows are casements with Gothic glazing. | II |
| The White House and The Smithy and blacksmith's shop 52.52996°N 2.93968°W | — | Mid 19th century | A pair of cottages and an attached smithy in roughcast stone with a slate roof. There are two storeys, and they contain casements with Gothic glazing. The blacksmith's shop is in limestone and has a slate roof. | II |
| Milestone near Walkmill Bridge; 52.52765°N 2.91685°W | | Mid to late 19th century | The milestone is on the east side of the road. It has a rounded ledged top, and is inscribed with the distances in miles to Bishops Castle and to Shrewsbury. | II |
| Milestone near Quarry Cottages; 52.52513°N 2.93664°W | | Mid to late 19th century | The milestone is on the south side of the road. It has a rounded ledged top, and is inscribed with the distances in miles to Bishops Castle and to Shrewsbury. | II |
