= Listed buildings in Wentnor =

Wentnor is a civil parish in Shropshire, England. It contains twelve listed buildings that are recorded in the National Heritage List for England. Of these, one is listed at Grade II*, the middle of the three grades, and the others are at Grade II, the lowest grade. The parish contains the village of Wentnor and smaller settlements, and is otherwise rural. The listed buildings consist of houses and cottages, farmhouses and farm buildings, a church, a bridge and three milestones.

== Key ==
Grade	Criteria
II*	Particularly important buildings of more than special interest
II	Buildings of national importance and special interest

== Buildings ==
Name and location	Photograph	Date	Notes	Grade
St Michael's Church; 52.52829°N 2.90997°W		12th century	The oldest part of the church is the nave. The bellcote was added probably in the 17th century, and in 1885–86 the nave was reconstructed, and the chancel, vestry and porch were added. The church is built in stone with slate roofs, and consists of a nave, a south porch, a chancel and a south vestry. At the west end is a broad timber framed bellcote with weatherboarding and a pyramidal roof with a weathervane, and the porch is also timber framed. In the north wall is a Norman window and blocked doorway, and more surviving medieval material. Most of the windows are lancets, and the east window is a triple lancet.	II*
1 Home Cottages; 52.50719°N 2.92016°W	—	17th century (probable)	The cottage, which probably has a timber framed core, was refaced and extended in the 19th century. It is in red brick, roughcast at the rear, with a band, and a slate roof. There is one storey and an attic, two bays, and a lean-to on the left. In the centre is a doorway, and the windows are casements with cambered heads.	II
The Old Shop; 52.53018°N 2.90824°W	—	17th century	A farmhouse and attached cowhouse, later a private house, that has been altered. It is in limestone with some brick, partly plastered, and has a tile roof. It consists of a three-bay range with one storey and an attic, a protruding three-bay wing with one storey, formerly a cowhouse, and a rear outshut. The windows are casements, and there are two gabled dormers. Inside the house is an inglenook fireplace with a chamfered lintel.	II
The Snead Farmhouse; 52.52903°N 2.90990°W	—	17th century	This consists of a farmhouse with an attached cottage to the left and an extension beyond that. The farmhouse is in brick on a plinth at the front and in limestone at the rear, with a slate roof. There are two storeys and an attic, and three bays with a central protruding two-storey porch that has a coped gable. The windows on the front are sashes with cambered heads, and elsewhere they are casements. The cottage is in limestone and has one storey and an attic, casement windows with Gothic glazing, and two gabled dormers. The extension has two bays.	II
The Home; 52.50726°N 2.91955°W	—	c. 1700 {probable)	The house was extended in the 19th century. It is in limestone with some painted brick, and stucco to the extension. The older part has two storeys and an attic, and an H-shaped plan with a two-bay range and two cross-wings. The extension has two storeys and an L-shaped plan with fronts of one and two bays. On the ground floor of the original part are casement windows, elsewhere the windows are sashes, in the older part with segmental heads.	II
Ashgrove and cowhouse 52.54586°N 2.90957°W	—	Early to mid 18th century (probable)	A farmhouse and attached cowhouse in limestone with brick dressings and a slate roof. There are two storeys, with three bays in the farmhouse and one in the cowhouse. The windows are casements, some with Gothic tracery and cambered heads. The cowhouse has a hayloft above, and is entered through the left gable end.	II
Walkmill Bridge; 52.52963°N 2.91685°W		18th century (probable)	The bridge carries a road over the River East Onny. It is in limestone and consists of two arches with voussoirs, a flat string course, and a cutwater. On the north side is a capped parapet, and on the south side are iron railings.	II
Walkmill Cottage and cowhouse 52.52994°N 2.91629°W	—	Late 18th century (probable)	The cottage and cowhouse are in limestone with slate roofs. The cottage has two storeys and two bays. On the front is a porch, and the windows are casements. One of the internal cross-walls is timber framed. The cowhouse is lower and incorporates a hayloft.	II
Milestone near Horse Shoe Inn; 52.56341°N 2.89730°W		Mid to late 19th century	The milestone is in white painted stone with black lettering. It has a round ledged top and inscribed with the distances in miles to Bishops Castle and to Shrewsbury.	II
Milestone near England Shelve Farmhouse; 52.55411°N 2.91277°W		Mid to late 19th century	The milestone is in white painted stone with black lettering. It has a round ledged top and inscribed with the distances in miles to Bishops Castle and to Shrewsbury.	II
Milestone near Upper Mill Farmhouse; 52.54125°N 2.91348°W		Mid to late 19th century	The milestone is in white painted stone with black lettering. It has a round ledged top and inscribed with the distances in miles to Bishops Castle and to Shrewsbury.	II
Stanbatch Cottage and cowhouse 52.53799°N 2.88271°W		1876	The cottage and attached farmhouse are in limestone with brick dressings and a slate roof. The cottage has two storeys and two bays. In the centre is a gabled porch, and the windows are casements with Gothic glazing, those in the ground floor with cambered heads. The cowhouse with a hayloft continues to the east and has an entrance with a cambered arch.	II
