= Quinny Brook =

Stream in Shropshire, England

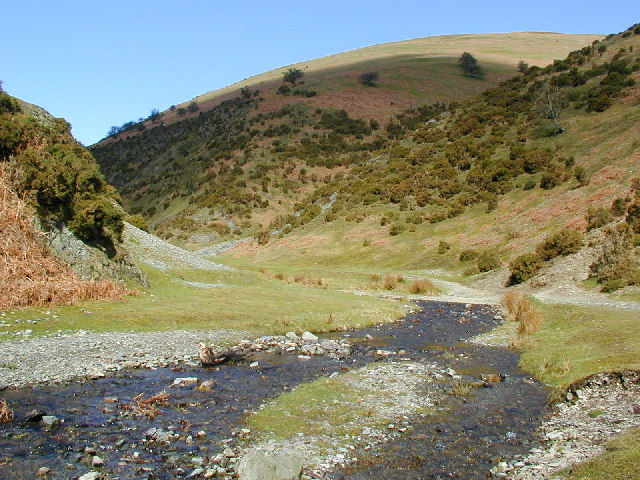
- The brook flowing through Ashes Hollow valley

Location
- Country: England
- Counties: Shropshire

Physical characteristics
- Source
  - location: Long Mynd
  - elevation: 475 m (1,558 ft)
- Mouth
  - location: Wistanstow, Shropshire
  - coordinates: 52.4538°N 2.8313°W
- Length: 14.5 km (9.0 mi)
- Basin size: 89 km^{2} (34 sq mi)

Quinny Brook is a tributary stream of the River Onny which flows through the Shropshire Hills National Landscape in England.

== Course ==
Its source is a spring called Boiling Well on the dissected plateau of the Long Mynd, adjacent to a number of round barrows. From this point it flows south-east through the V-shaped valley known as Ashes Hollow, to reach the village of Little Stretton.

After passing through Little Stretton, the watercourse heads south towards Marshbrook and Strefford. To the north of Strefford, it is joined by its main tributary the Byne Brook. The now larger brook is forded at Strefford from where it flows south-westerly to The Grove and Berrymill cottage, south of Wistanstow, where it joins the River Onny. The brook has a total length of 8.7 miles (14 km).

The drainage basin for the brook, which lies between that of the River Onny to the west, the Cound Brook to the east, and that of the River Corve to the south, has an area of 89 square kilometres (34 mi^{2}).

== Byne brook ==
The principal tributary of the Quinny is the Byne Brook, which flows through Ape Dale at the foot of Wenlock Edge. Its source is near Rushbury, where it is known as Lakehouse brook, and it is also known as Eaton brook as it passes the village of Eaton-under-Heywood. The Byne brook is 14.3 km long and has a catchment area of 53 square kilometres (20 mi^{2}), thereby contributing nearly two-thirds of the total catchment area of the Quinny brook.

== Ecology ==
The Quinny and Byne brooks have been classed as having moderate ecological quality under the Water Framework Directive. This is the middle band in the five part framework scale, which ranges from high, good, and moderate, through to poor and finally bad.

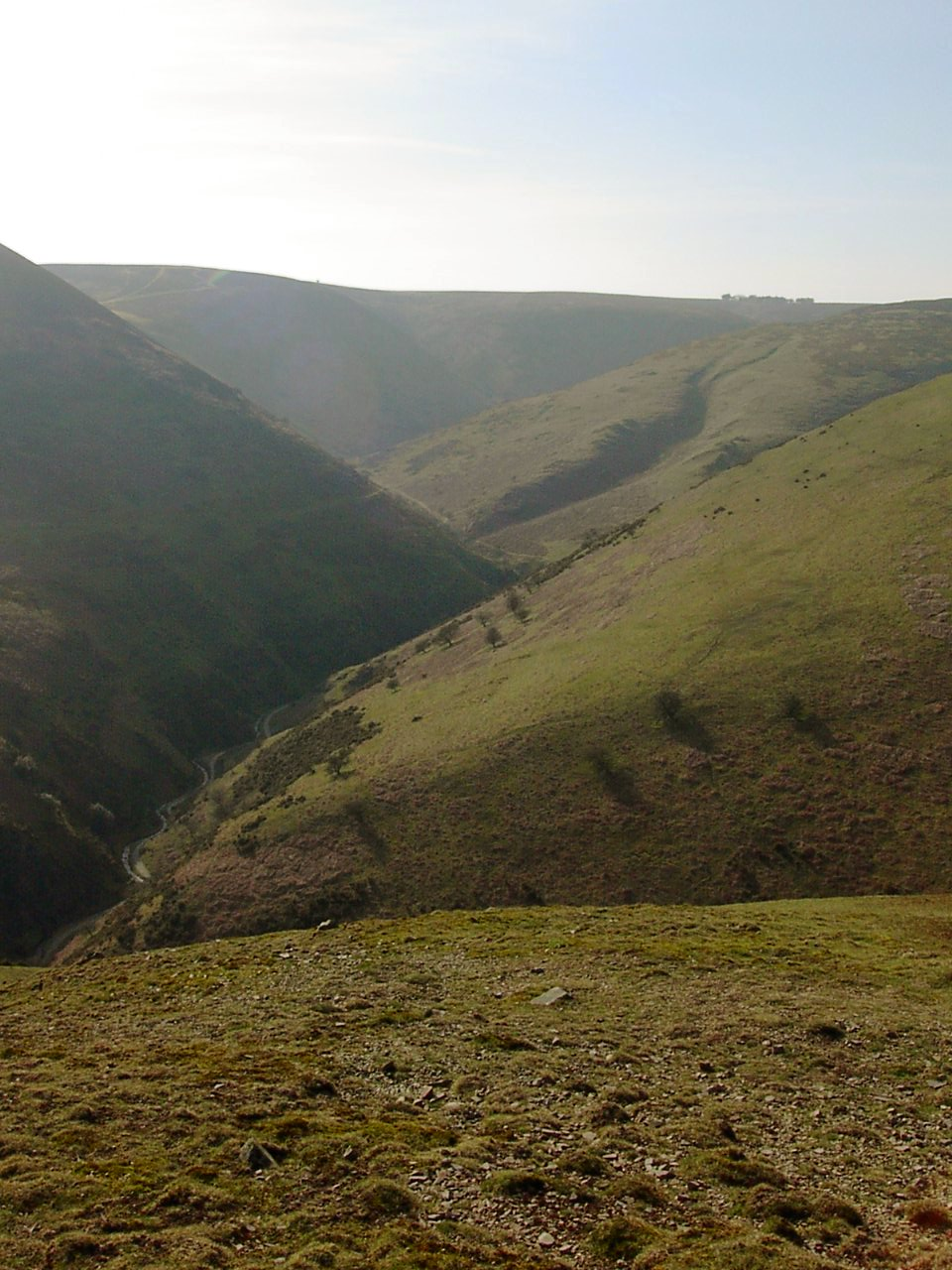
The view up Ashes Hollow towards Pole Bank
