= Listed buildings in Myndtown =

Myndtown is a civil parish in Shropshire, England. It contains eight listed buildings that are recorded in the National Heritage List for England. Of these, one is at Grade II*, the middle of the three grades, and the others are at Grade II, the lowest grade. The parish contains the villages of Asterton and Myndtown and the surrounding countryside. Apart from a church that originated in the 12th century, all the listed buildings are houses, cottages, farmhouses, and farm buildings.

== Key ==
Grade	Criteria
II*	Particularly important buildings of more than special interest
II	Buildings of national importance and special interest

== Buildings ==
Name and location	Photograph	Date	Notes	Grade
St John the Baptist's Church; 52.50035°N 2.89948°W		12th century	The church was restored in 1859. It is in stone, roughcast and whitewashed, and has slate roofs. The church consists of a nave, a south porch, and a lower chancel. At the west end is a bellcote with weatherboarded sides, a pyramidal cap, and a weathervane in the form of a fish. The porch is open and timber framed with five pointed arches, and incorporates a cruck truss.	II*
Home Farmhouse; 52.51489°N 2.88828°W	—	14th or 15th century	The farmhouse was later remodelled and extended. It is basically timber framed with cruck construction, and has been clad and extended in limestone. The house has a slate roof, and two storeys. Most of the windows are casements, and there is a small staircase window. Inside is a cruck truss that has been truncated, and timber framed walls, one with wattle and daub infill.	II
Asterton House; 52.51421°N 2.88823°W		c. 1600	The house was remodelled and extended in about 1700 and later. It is in stone, probably with a timber framed core, and has slate roofs. The original part has three bays, and there is a lower extension to the west. There are two storeys, casement windows and a gabled porch. Inside is an inglenook fireplace.	II
Myndtown Hall Farmhouse; 52.50000°N 2.89887°W	—	c. 1600	The farmhouse was later altered and extended. The oldest part is the cross-wing to the south, which is timber framed with plaster infill, and has two storeys and an attic. The gable end is jettied at the upper floor and the attic, with moulded bressumers, in the attic with carved brackets. The main range and the parallel range at the rear are roughcast over brown brick, they have two storeys and three bays. The roofs are partly slated and partly tiled, the windows are casements, and the doorway has a fanlight and a gabled hood.	II
North Handless; 52.50780°N 2.89094°W	—	17th century	A timber framed cottage with brick infill on a stone plinth, with a tile roof. There is one storey and an attic, four bays, a lean-to entrance, and a rear outshut. The windows are casements, and there are two gabled eaves dormers.	II
Asterton Hall; 52.51591°N 2.88906°W	—	Early to mid 18th century	A red brick farmhouse, partly roughcast, on a chamfered plinth, with bands and a tile roof. There are two storeys, an attic and cellars, and four bays. The windows are casements with cambered heads, there are two gabled dormers, and the entrance is approached by steps on the west side.	II
Barn and cowshed west of Asterton Hall; 52.51569°N 2.88946°W	—	Early to mid 18th century	The barn and cowshed are in red brick with bands, and the building has a stone-slate roof repaired with Welsh slate and tiles. It contains doorways, eaves hatches and ventilation shafts.	II
The White House; 52.51641°N 2.88914°W	—	c. 1800 (probable)	The farmhouse is in roughcast limestone with a slate roof. There are two storeys and an attic, three bays, a two-storey extension to the right with a hipped roof, and in the angle is a further extension with three sides. Above the middle bay is a small gable containing a lunette, and the other windows are casements with cambered heads. The central doorway has a fanlight and a hood.	II
