= Asterton =

Hamlet in Shropshire, England

Coordinates: 52.515°N 2.889°W

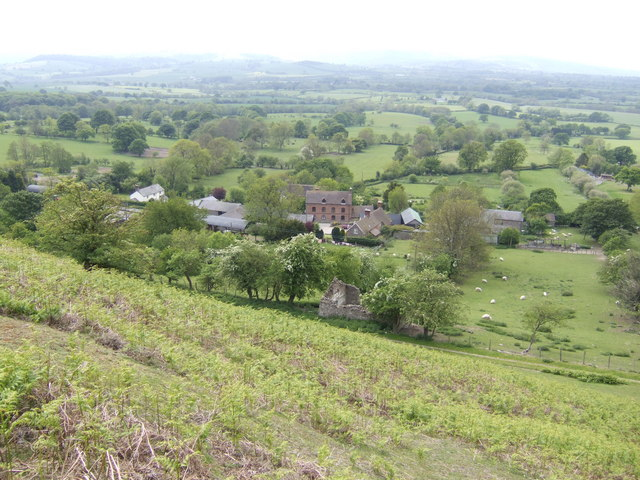
- Asterton and the Clun Forest

- Location within Shropshire
- Population: 50
- OS grid reference: SO396912
- Civil parish: Myndtown
- Unitary authority: Shropshire
- Ceremonial county: Shropshire
- Region: West Midlands
- Country: England
- Sovereign state: United Kingdom
- Post town: Lydbury North
- Postcode district: SY7
- Dialling code: 01588
- Police: West Mercia
- Fire: Shropshire
- Ambulance: West Midlands
- UK Parliament: Ludlow

Asterton is a hamlet in Shropshire, England, in the civil parish of Myndtown. The name means "eastern home farm", from Old English east "east" and "ham" "home". It is thought to date back to early Saxon times. It is situated 4 miles (6.4 km) south-west of Church Stretton, 5 miles (8 km) north-west of Bishop's Castle, 13 miles (21 km) north-west of Ludlow and 15 miles (24 km) south of Shrewsbury, the county town of Shropshire. The nearest other settlements are Prolley Moor, Wentnor, Ratlinghope, Myndtown and Little Stretton.

The village is home to 40 residents in 13 houses.

It is well-known for being at the foot of the long, steep and precipitous single-lane road that runs down the western ridge of the Long Mynd into the village. This road is often closed during spells of adverse weather in the winter, which results in motorists facing a diversion via Plowden and Marshbrook before reaching Church Stretton. The Midland Gliding club is situated at the top of this road, above the village on the Long Mynd.

== See also ==
- Listed buildings in Myndtown
