= Shropshire Way =

202-mile footpath in Shropshire, England

The Shropshire Way Main Route is a waymarked long distance footpath running through the English county of Shropshire. It runs 202 miles (325 km) around the interior of the county in two loops centred on Shrewsbury, with an additional spur to Whitchurch.

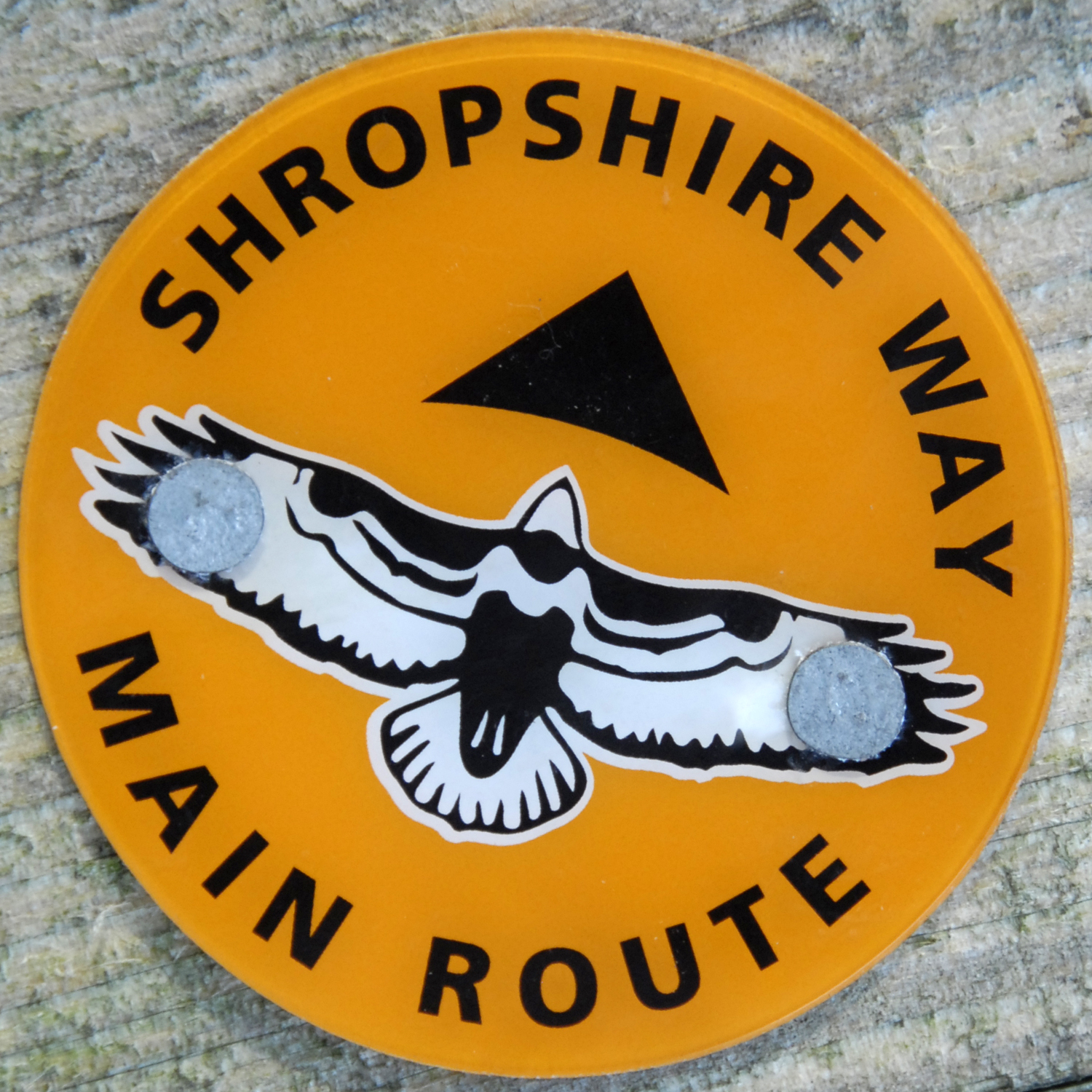
New Shropshire Way waymark on The Wrekin

== The Main Route ==
The Main Route South was launched in 2017. It is divided into Stages 1 to 9, 10a and 10b. The Main Route North was launched in September 2019; this has stages 11 to 15 (stage 12 includes the Whitchurch spur as an alternative ending). This is fully documented in the website of the Shropshire Way Association.

== Old waymarked route ==
The route when marked on a map of the county used to loosely resemble a 'hangman's noose' with the rope dangling from the northern border of Shropshire at Grindley Brook. The route then runs south to Wem and then to Clive and Grinshill where the circular loop begins, taking you to Shrewsbury, then via Lyth Hill further south into the Shropshire Hills.

== Old additional loop ==
In the Shropshire Hills Area of Outstanding Natural Beauty an additional loop on the route runs to Stiperstones, Bishops Castle and Clun linking back to the main route via the River Onny at Little Stretton and the Long Mynd.

== Old buzzard waymark ==
The old path was distinctly waymarked with a buzzard symbol in black and white usually easily seen from field edges and across most country.

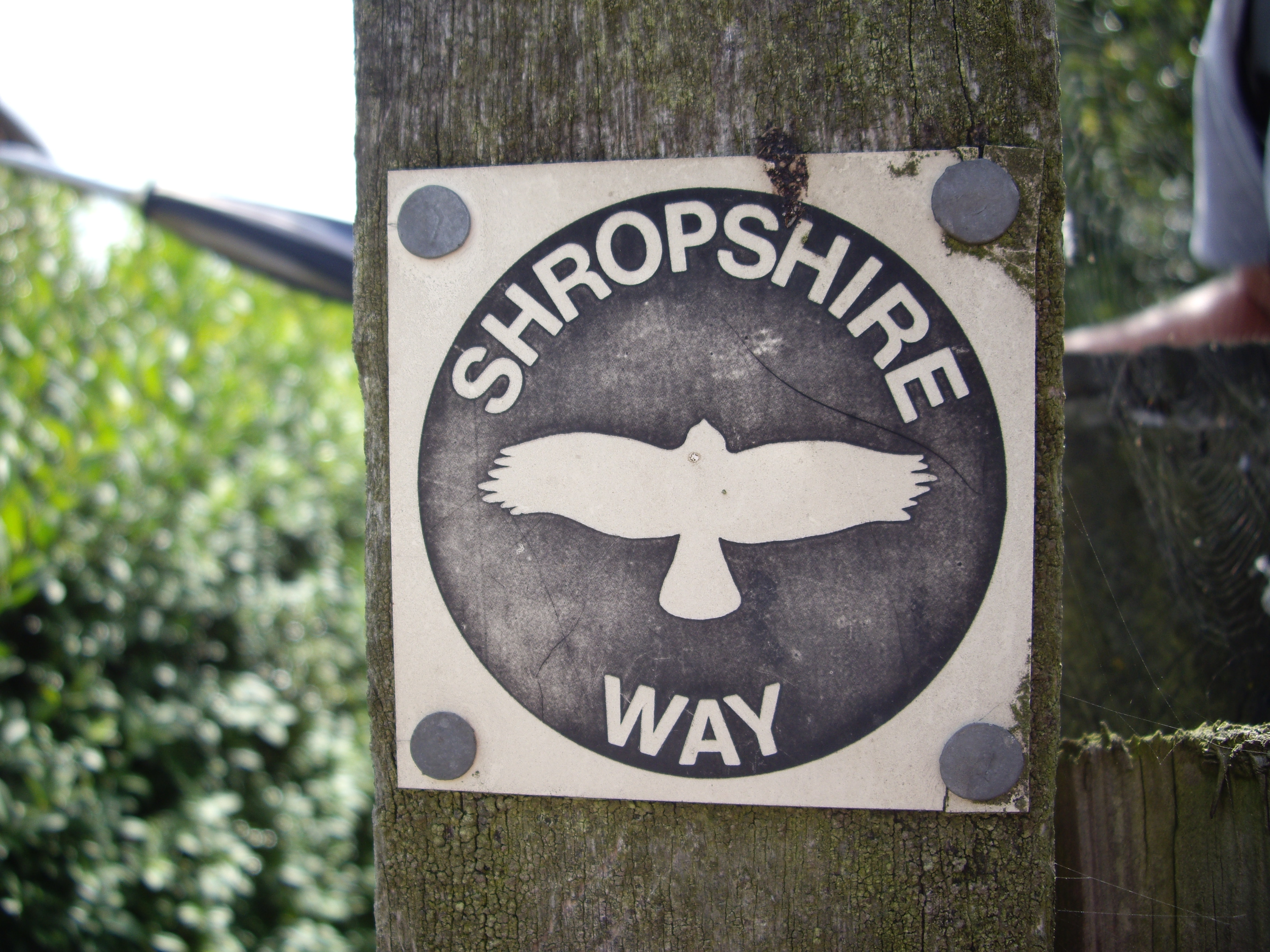
The old distinctive waymark of the Shropshire Way

== Old improvements ==
The southern section of the Shropshire Way underwent a major refurbishment in 2007/2008. Extra sections have been added to make it circular in its own right and some original routes have been "tweaked" so they now go to more places of interest. This led to confusion, hence the 2017 to 2019 re-waymarking.
