= Wentnor Group =

Geological group in Great Britain

The Wentnor Group is an assemblage of two geological formations associated with the Longmyndian Supergroup of Precambrian age in present-day Wales, U.K.

The rocks are located between the Church Stretton Fault and the Pontesford-Linley Lineament. The Wentnor Group is a predominantly sedimentary group with a range of facies attributable to that of a closing ocean. The Wentnor Group overlies the Stretton Group of rocks and although the units are separate, together they show a good geological progression. At the base of the Stretton Group the rocks are of basinal oceanic facies and over time a coarsening occurs with increased terrigenous input from the continent. Turbidites are observed and deltas form latterly with alluvial plains with occasional marine washovers. This creeps up into the Wentnor Group where alluvial plains occur latterly with fluvial and alluvial deposits noted in the uppermost (youngest) Bridges Formation.

== Bridges Formation ==
This is the topmost formation of the Wentnor Group and viz. the Longmyndian Supergroup. The unit grades up from the underlying Bayston-Oakswood Formation. The massive and cross-bedded sandstones of the underlying unit become interbedded with purple siltstones and thin ripple cross laminated sandstones. Thick cross-bedded sandstones are recorded with sharp erosional bases and are interpreted as fluvial channels running upon mud rich alluvial plain deposits.

== Bayston-Oakswood Formation ==
This is made up of fine to medium grained cross-stratified sandstone with mudstone rip-up clasts and sub-rounded lithic clasts. There are interbeds of cross-laminated finer grained sandstones with apparent upward fining successions. The formation also contains matrix and clast supported conglomerate members with sub-rounded lithic clasts and sub-angular sedimentary clasts. These are interpreted as braided fluvial deposits. (Unit is barren of fossils).
