= Myndtown =

Village in Shropshire, England

Coordinates: 52.500°N 2.899°W

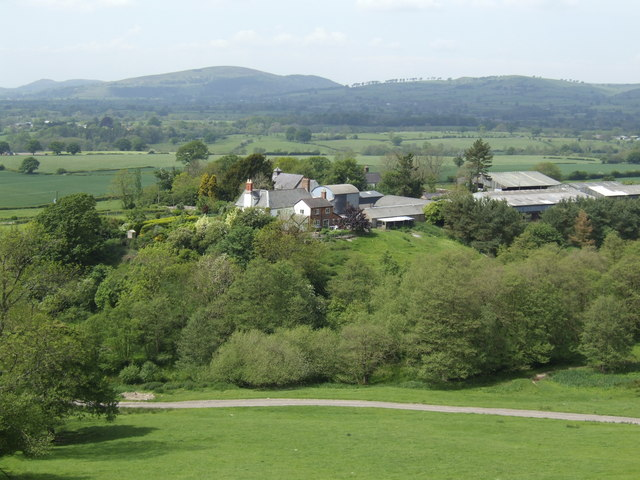
- Myndtown

- Location within Shropshire
- OS grid reference: SO389895
- Civil parish: Myndtown
- Unitary authority: Shropshire
- Ceremonial county: Shropshire
- Region: West Midlands
- Country: England
- Sovereign state: United Kingdom
- Post town: LYDBURY NORTH
- Postcode district: SY7
- Dialling code: 01588
- Police: West Mercia
- Fire: Shropshire
- Ambulance: West Midlands
- UK Parliament: Ludlow

Myndtown (sometimes formerly spelt Mindtown) is a small village and civil parish in rural Shropshire, around 5 miles to the north-east of Bishop's Castle.

The village of Myndtown itself lies immediately beneath the slope of the Long Mynd; it consists of only one farm, the former rectory and the small parish church of St. John the Baptist, which has 12th-century origins and is Grade II* listed. The parish is sparsely populated and includes some other small settlements such as Asterton.

== See also ==
- Listed buildings in Myndtown
