= Longmyndian Supergroup =

Sequence of late Precambrian rocks in the United Kingdom

- Stratigraphic range: Ediacaran; 566–555 Ma
- Type: Supergroup
- Sub-units: Wentor Group; Stretton Group

Location
- Location: Long Mynd
- Coordinates: 52.54775°N 2.838894°W

The Longmyndian Supergroup is a 6,000-metre-thick (20,000 ft) sequence of Ediacaran (late Precambrian) rocks that outcrop between the Pontesford–Linley Fault System and the Church Stretton Fault System in the Welsh Borderland Fault System of England and Wales. The supergroup consists of two major geological groups, the Stretton Group and the overlying Wentnor Group. The successions represented by these two groups have also been referred to as the Eastern Longymndian and Western Longmyndian respectively, forming as they do the bedrock of the east and west parts of the Long Mynd in Shropshire. The rocks are a generally regressive sequence from basinal facies to clastic sedimentation. The rocks are thought to be derived from Uriconian mountains that were formed during the southward subduction of an oceanic plate beneath a continental block (ocean closure). The rocks have since been folded due to fault movements and plunge gently to the south.

The Longmyndian rocks were deposited in northeast–southwest trending faulted rift basins. These were deposited on top of the Uriconian volcaniclastic deposits. Subsequent ocean closure squeezed these rocks together to provide sub-vertical bedding in the synclinal sequence seen in exposed rocks today. The deposited rocks of the Longmyndian show a variety of depositional facies that tell a story of ocean closure. The Longmyndian deposits rest upon Uriconian rocks but different sections are exposed exclusively between the Church Stretton Fault and the Pontesford-Linley Lineament.

== Wentnor Group ==
Once known as the Wentnor Series, the Wentnor Group is made up of two formations. Uppermost within the group and supergroup are the fluvial deposits of the Bridges Formation. They are underlain by the braided deposits of the Bayston-Oakwood Formation. Debate remains as to whether the Wentnor Group succeeds the Stretton Group without a break or if there is an unconformity at this point.

- Bridges Formation
- Bayston-Oakwood Formation
  - Stanbatch Conglomerate Member (two beds in lower half of fmtn)

== Stretton Group ==
Once known as the Stretton Series, the Stretton Group consists of six formations varying between 2.7 and 4 km thick overall. Topmost of the group, the Portway Formation, consists of braided fluvial deposits with marine incursions. The underlying Lightspout Formation is interpreted as originating in a fluvio-deltaic environment, this is preceded by a similar facies in the Synalds Formation. Turbidite facies are prevalent in the Burway Formation which underlies it and the deep marine basinal environments continue toward the base of the supergroup within the Stretton Shale Formation. The Ragleth Tuff Formation is the basal unit of the Stretton Group and the supergroup sequence. Distinct sub-units within certain of the formations are afforded 'member' status. In stratigraphical order, i.e. uppermost/youngest first:

- Portway Formation
  - Huckster Conglomerate Member (or 'Narnells Grit', at base of fmtn)
- Lightspout Formation
- Synalds Formation
  - Batch Volcanic Member
- Burway Formation
  - Cardingmill Grit Member (at top of fmtn)
  - Buxton Rock Member (at base of fmtn)
- Stretton Shale Formation
- Ragleth Tuff Formation

== Dating ==
Within the strata are bentonite and lapilli tuff horizons that allow for zircon U-Pb dating and, noted within the Batch Volcanics of the Synalds Formation, a date is returned of 566±2.9 Ma. The Lightspout Formation toward the top of the Stretton Group returned a date of 555.9±3.5 Ma.
