= Blasting St. Vincent's Rock, Clifton =

1830 painting by John Sell Cotman

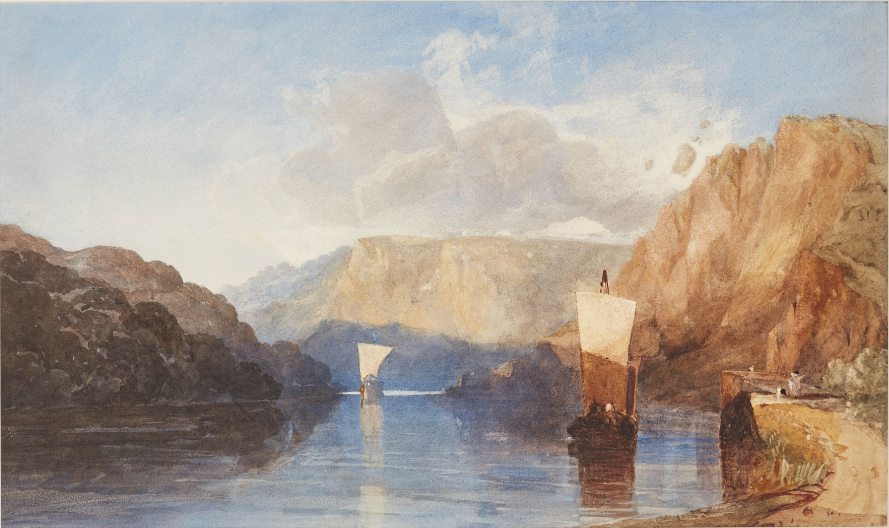
- Artist: John Sell Cotman
- Year: 1830
- Type: watercolor with touches of gum Arabic over pencil on off-white paper
- Dimensions: 34 cm × 57.8 cm (13.5 in × 22.75 in)
- Location: Indianapolis Museum of Art; Indianapolis

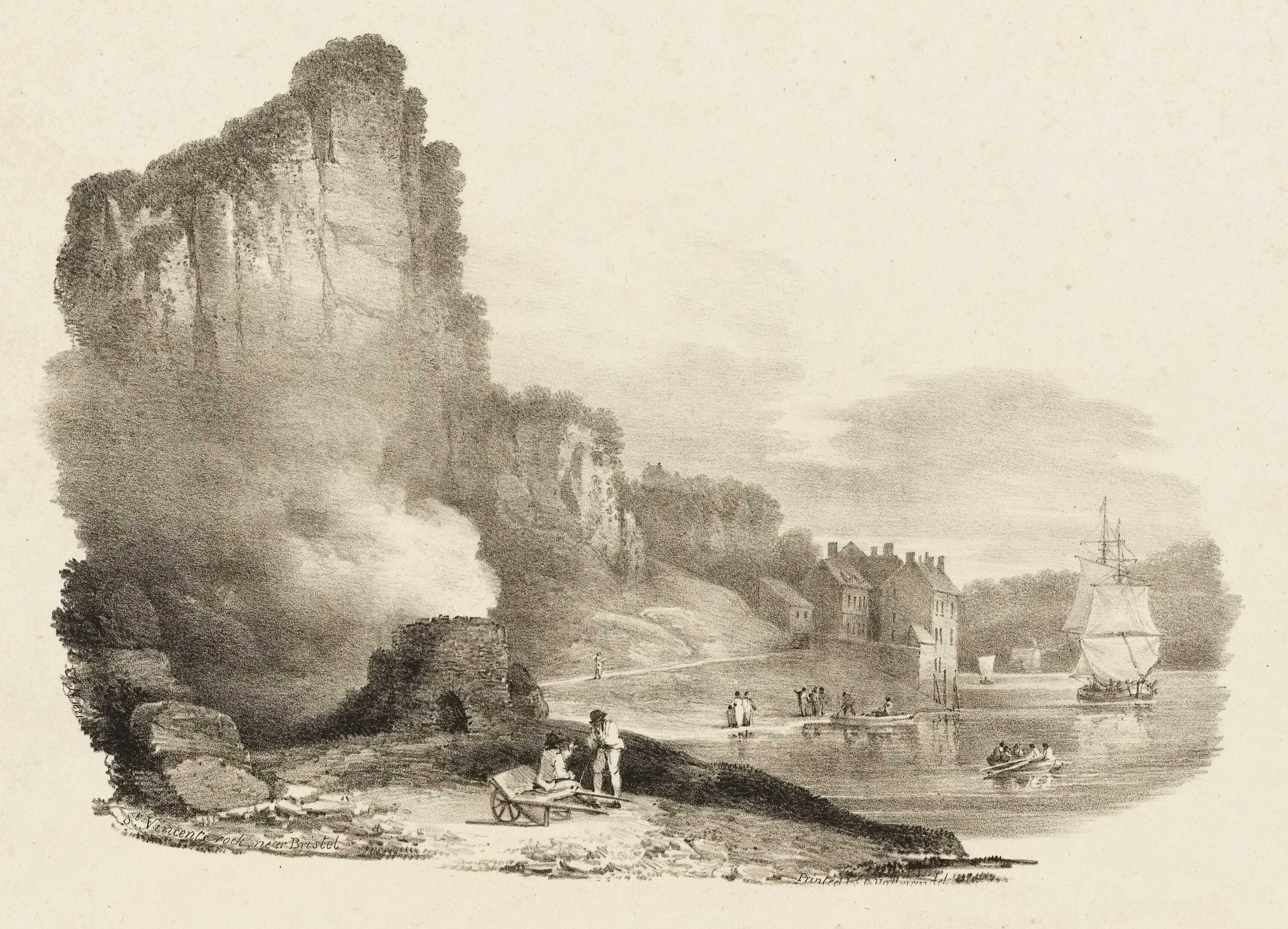
St Vincent rock near Bristol prior to blasting work, by Charles Joseph Hullmandel

Blasting St. Vincent's Rock, Clifton is a watercolor created by Norwich artist John Sell Cotman. Created in 1830, it is held in the Indianapolis Museum of Art.

== Description ==
In the foreground, there is a boat, floating down the Avon River, right outside Bristol. There is a second boat, further down the river, nearer to the action of the painting. The dark, rocky cliffs on the left are juxtaposed with the light, sheer cliffs on the right, creating a deep contrast for the centre, where the river runs through. The subject of the painting, not in the foreground, is a chunk of limestone being blown off the cliff face, in preparation for the construction of the Clifton Suspension Bridge.

== Historical information ==
The subject matter was given to Cotman by his friend and patron, Reverend James Bulwer, who lived in Bristol. The view is believed to be one of the last views from this popular vantage point, as the view was lost in 1831, when construction of the Clifton Suspension Bridge started. Cotman's style of watercolor varied from his contemporaries, opting to use watercolors like paint, instead of a tint. He used the paints in unique ways, using the translucent quality of the medium to his full advantage.

=== Acquisition ===
The Indianapolis Museum of Art purchased Blasting St. Vincent's Rock in 1999, using the Beeler Fund, the Mr. and Mrs. Spurlock Fund and James E. Roberts fund.
