= Stretton Group =

Group of rocks in Shropshire, England

The Stretton Group is a group of rocks associated with the Longmyndian Supergroup of Ediacaran age, in Shropshire, England. The rocks are located within the tract between two elements of the Welsh Borderland Fault System, the Church Stretton Fault and the Pontesford-Linley Lineament.

The Stretton Group is a predominantly sedimentary group with a range of facies attributable to that of a closing ocean. The Wentnor Group overlies the Stretton Group of rocks and although the units are separate, together they show a good geological progression. At the base of the Stretton Group the rocks are of basinal oceanic facies and as time goes a coarsening occurs with increased terrigenous input from the continent. Turbidites are observed and deltas form latterly with alluvial plains with occasional marine washovers.

This creeps up into the Wentnor Group where alluvial plains latterly with fluvial and alluvial deposits noted in the uppermost (youngest) Bridges Formation. The information below is present oldest to youngest.

The progradational Longmyndian Sequence from oldest to youngest is: Ragleth Tuff Formation; Stretton Shale Formation; Burway Formation; Synalds Formation; Lightspout Formation; Portway Formation; Bayston-Oakswood Formation; Bridges Formation. The latter two units belong to the Wentnor Group. Below we carry on from the underlying Portway Formation (Stretton Group).

== Ragleth Tuff Formation ==
This is a unit of coarse epiclastic sediments that may pass upward into the Helmeth Grit. Its position is stratigraphically tentative.

== Stretton Shale Formation ==
A grey/green shale with normally graded siltstone which is interpreted as a distal turbidite with basin floor facies. The Helmeth Grit is located at the base of the unit (medium-grained sandstone). The Stretton Shale has been assigned a geochronological time of 566Ma+/-2.9.

== Burway Formation ==
The base of this formation is defined as the base of the rhyolitic tuffs of the Buxton Rock Member. It coarsens upwards from thin to thick bedded turbidite lobe facies. Above the turbidite facies are shallow marine mudstones and then deltaic sandstones. The uppermost unit, the Cardingmill Grit, at the top is interpreted as a fluvial deposit. Beltanelliformis minutae and Beltanelliformis brunsae occur in the succession.

== Synalds Formation ==
A mudstone lithology with inter-bedded, laminated and cross stratified sandstones is interpreted as alluvial plain, fluvial and possibly deltaic deposits. Mudstones are green at the base of the unit and red at the top. Beltanelliformis miuntae and Beltanelliformis brunsae occur in the succession.

== Lightspout Formation ==
Laminated mudstones that coarsen upwards with upward fining sandstones interpreted as alluvial plain, fluvial and possibly deltaic facies. Beltanelliformis miuntae occurs in the succession. The succession is geochronologically dated at 555.9Ma+/-3.5.

The formation also contains matrix and clast supported conglomerate members with sub-rounded lithic clasts and sub-angular sedimentary clasts. These are interpreted as braided fluvial deposits. The unit is barren of fossils.

== Portway Formation ==
This succession comprises red mudstones and siltstones interbedded with fine grained sandstones although it is sandier and coarser than the Synalds and Lightspout formations but also interpreted as alluvial plain and fluvial deposits. The base is marked by the Huckster Conglomerate which is thought to be deposited in a braided fluvial (palaeo)environment.
