= Wentnor =

Village in Shropshire, England

Coordinates: 52.529°N 2.91°W

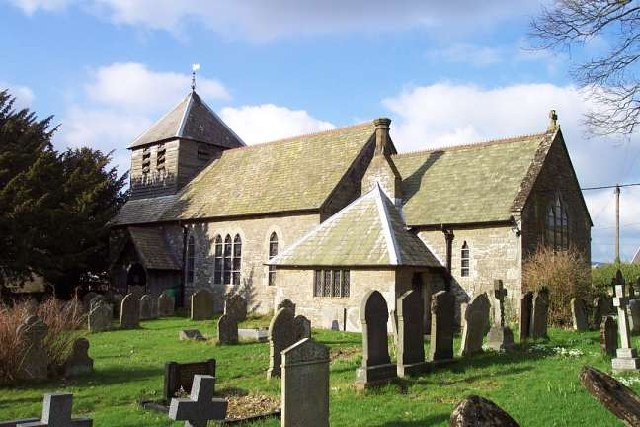
- St. Michael and All Angels church, Wentnor

- Location within Shropshire
- Population: 346 (2011)
- OS grid reference: SO382927
- Civil parish: Wentnor
- Unitary authority: Shropshire
- Ceremonial county: Shropshire
- Region: West Midlands
- Country: England
- Sovereign state: United Kingdom
- Post town: Bishop's Castle
- Postcode district: SY9
- Dialling code: 01588
- Police: West Mercia
- Fire: Shropshire
- Ambulance: West Midlands
- UK Parliament: Ludlow

Wentnor is a village and civil parish in Shropshire, England.

It lies to the west of the Long Mynd and between the village and the hill range is the dispersed settlement of Prolly Moor. The village itself is situated atop a hill, which rises to 269 metres (883 ft) above sea level, with the Criftin Brook to the east and the River East Onny to the west. The nearest towns are Church Stretton and Bishop's Castle, the village of Asterton lies 1 mile to the south east of the village.

There is a parish church and two public houses: the "Crown" in the village itself and the "Inn on the Green" which is in a hamlet, just outside the village, by the River East Onny called The Green.

== Transport ==
The village no longer has a local bus service, Church Stretton railway station is 6 miles away and provides regular rail services to South Wales and the North.

== See also ==
- Listed buildings in Wentnor
