= Little Stretton, Shropshire =

Village in Shropshire, England

Coordinates: 52.521°N 2.822°W

Little Stretton
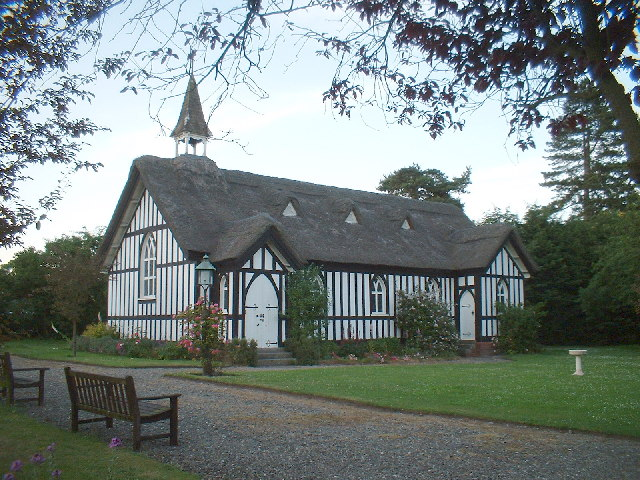
- The thatched All Saints' church in the village

- Location within Shropshire
- OS grid reference: SO443917
  - London: 158 miles (254 km)
- Civil parish: Church Stretton
- Unitary authority: Shropshire
- Ceremonial county: Shropshire
- Region: West Midlands
- Country: England
- Sovereign state: United Kingdom
- Post town: CHURCH STRETTON
- Postcode district: SY6
- Dialling code: 01694
- Police: West Mercia
- Fire: Shropshire
- Ambulance: West Midlands
- UK Parliament: Ludlow

Little Stretton is a village and former civil parish, now in the parish of Church Stretton, in the Shropshire district, in the ceremonial county of Shropshire, England. In 1961 the parish had a population of 80. Little Stretton became a civil parish in 1899 being formed from Church Stretton, on 1 April 1966 the parish was abolished and merged with Church Stretton.

It is located in the Shropshire Hills Area of Outstanding Natural Beauty between the Long Mynd and Ragleth Hill. Lying on the B5477 south of the market town of Church Stretton; similarly, the small village of All Stretton lies to the north of Church Stretton on the same road. A milestone in the centre of the village on the B5477, which is called Ludlow Road at this point, indicates that Ludlow is 14 miles (23 km) away, to the south. The centre of Church Stretton is 1.3 miles (2.1 km) away via the B5477.

The Quinny Brook runs from Ashes Hollow through the village and it is a popular place to begin walks up the Long Mynd. The village lies between 590 and 616 feet above sea level. Ragleth Hill lies immediately to the east of the village, on the other side of the Welsh Marches Line and A49. Little Stretton once had its own railway halt: Little Stretton Halt railway station.

To the southwest are the hamlets of Minton and Hamperley, which are part of Church Stretton parish and are included within the parish ward of Little Stretton. The modern-day parish of Church Stretton is sometimes referred to as "Church Stretton and Little Stretton".

== Amenities and attractions ==
The village has a large Conservation Area. There are many Listed buildings and structures in the village.

=== Church ===
There is a small church in the village, built in 1903 - "All Saints". It is a Church of England church and is one of three in the ecclesiastical parish of Church Stretton, along with the churches in All Stretton and Church Stretton. The parish is part of the Diocese of Hereford. It is a very unusual church (for England in the present era) for its construction is timber with a thatched roof replacing the original corrugated iron roof.

=== Pubs ===
As of 2012, there are approximately 110 dwellings in the village. Little Stretton today has two public houses: the Green Dragon and the Ragleth Inn (historically the "Sun Inn"), both of which serve a wide range of local real ales.

=== Brockhurst Castle ===
Half a mile to the north are the earthwork remains of the 12th-century Brockhurst Castle. It is situated on private land with no public access.

== Notable people ==
Novelist and short story writer Beatrice Harraden (1864-1936) spent summer holidays lodging at the Green Dragon, inspiring her short story At the Green Dragon (published 1894).

Oliver Sandys (1892-1964), widow of Caradoc Evans and a novelist in her own right, lived at the Ancient House, across the road from the church, from the 1950s. A later novel, Quaint Place (1952) was set in this area.

Michael Bourke (born 1941), Church of England clergyman, Bishop of Wolverhampton, has lived at Little Stretton in retirement.

The poet Peter Reading (1946–2011) lived in the village.

The horologist Charles Jendon was a well-known figure in the village for many years; his knowledge of long-case clocks was well known to many specialists in the field.

The music critic Ephriam Monk, who championed the early work of Lionel Crill, who himself was a pioneer in the use of the theremin in classical music, lived in the village between 1952 and 1959.

== Gallery ==
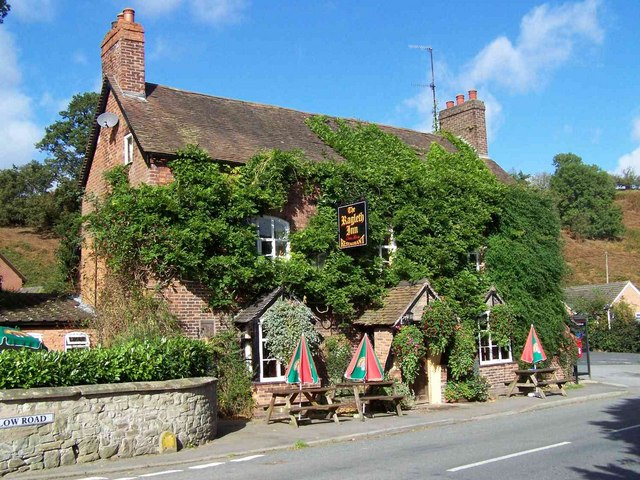
Ragleth Inn in the village

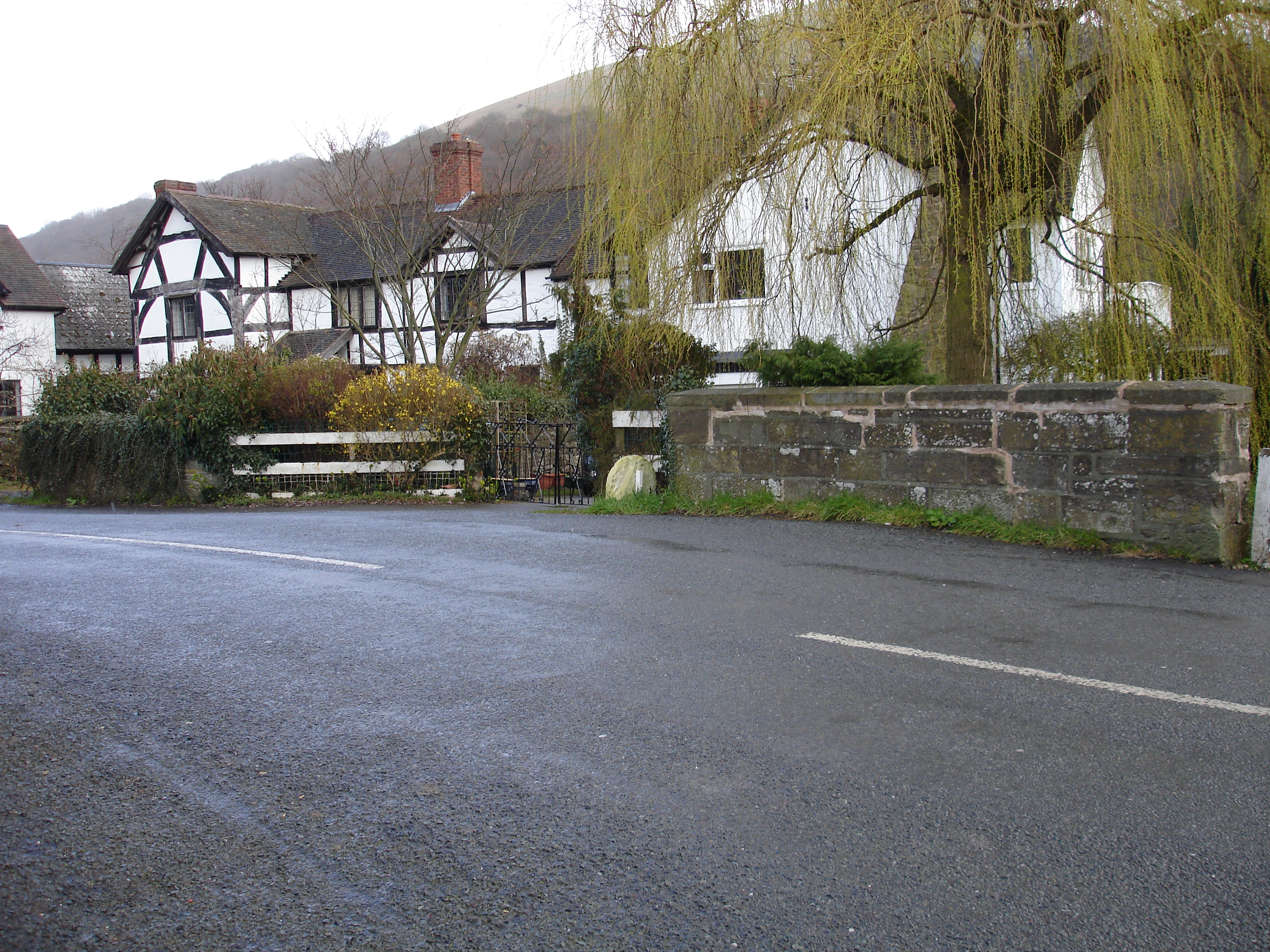
Ludlow Road where it crosses the small Quinny Brook from Ashes Hollow - the beige milestone, facing the other way, can be seen

== See also ==
- Listed buildings in Church Stretton
