= Long Mynd =

Heath and moorland plateau in Shropshire, England

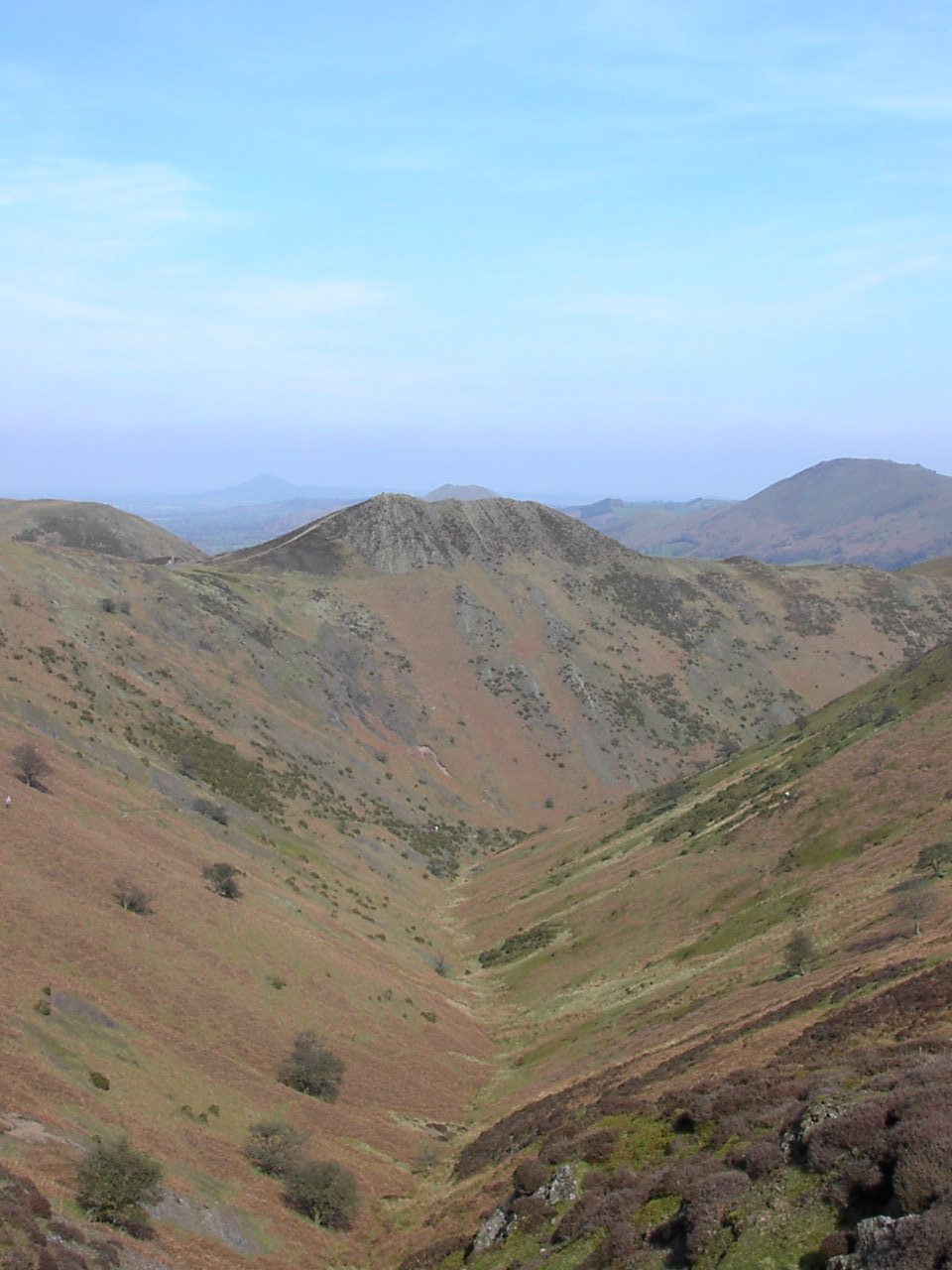
- View down Townbrook Valley toward Burway Hill

Highest point
- Peak: Pole Bank
- Elevation: 516 m (1,693 ft)
- Coordinates: 52°32′42.42″N 2°51′53.25″W

Dimensions
- Length: 11.26 km (7.00 mi) N–S
- Width: 4.8 km (3.0 mi) E–W
- Area: 54 km^{2} (21 mi^{2})

Geography
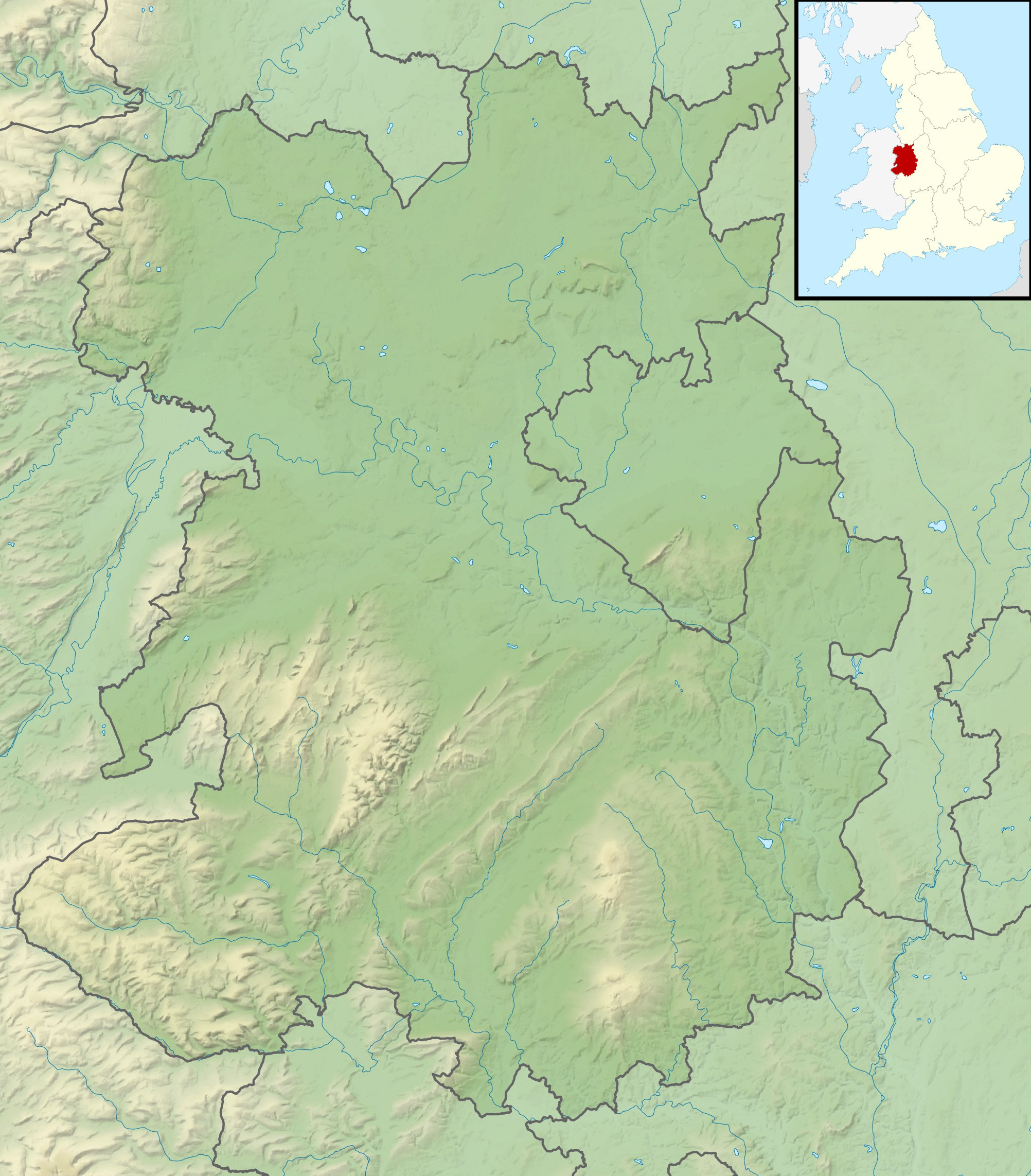
- Location within Shropshire
- Country: England
- County: Shropshire
- Range coordinates: 52°32′51.90″N 2°50′20.02″W
- Borders on: Stiperstones; Stretton Hills; Wenlock Edge
- Biome: Heathland; Moorland

Geology
- Formed by: Glaciation
- Rock age: Quaternary
- Rock type: Sandstone

The Long Mynd is a heath and moorland plateau that forms part of the Shropshire Hills in Shropshire, England. The high ground, which is common land and designated as a National Landscape, lies between the Stiperstones range to the west and the Stretton Hills and Wenlock Edge to the east. Much of it is owned by the National Trust, and is managed by the Longmynd Commoners.

The Long Mynd is approximately 7 miles (11 km) long by 3 miles (5 km) wide, and is broadly characterised by steep valleys on its eastern flanks, and a long slope to the western side rising in a steep escarpment. In its vicinity are the principal settlements of Church Stretton, Little Stretton and All Stretton, Pulverbatch, Smethcott, Woolstaston, Asterton, Myndtown, Wentnor and Ratlinghope.

The highest point on the Long Mynd is Pole Bank (1,693 ft, 516 m); this and the adjacent hill of Caer Caradoc (1,506 ft, 459 m) are classed as Marilyns.

== Etymology ==
The name Long Mynd means "long mountain", the second element being Brittonic in origin. In modern Welsh it is named Mynydd Hir [ˈmənɪð ˈhiːr], which has the same meaning, or Cefn Hirfynydd, meaning "long mountain ridge".

== Commoning on Long Mynd ==
There is pollen evidence to show that trees began to be replaced by grass on the plateau of the Long Mynd from the Bronze Age and written evidence of organised management as a grazed common from the 13th century. The Long Mynd commoners' ponies and sheep grazed here are hardy animals and are well adapted to the harsh conditions of life on the hill. They graze selectively and very close to the ground, leaving patches of long vegetation which benefits insects and small mammals.

This grazing pattern has resulted in a special ecology and the Long Mynd Common is therefore designated as a Site of Special Scientific Interest. To enhance the ecology the commoners have, since 1999 been in an environmental stewardship scheme that also supports sustainable farming practices.

Livestock grazing plays an important role in maintaining species-rich habitats by controlling the more aggressive plant species which would otherwise dominate the area.

Other than the boundary fence which is largely maintained by the commoners, there is no other fencing on the hill that restricts the movement of livestock. Therefore, to undertake routine husbandry tasks, commoners use dogs to gather their flocks together before driving them off the hill back to the farm. The sheep from each farm know instinctively where their flock's grazing boundary is. This ancient practice, known as hefting, is passed down the generations of sheep through the shepherding by the commoners.

== Geology ==
=== Precambrian ===
The Long Mynd is formed from Late Precambrian (Ediacaran) sedimentary rocks. Referred to collectively as the Longmyndian Supergroup, the rock sequence is divided into two groups; the older Stretton Group comprising five named formations and the younger Wentnor Group formed of two formations. The entire 7000m thick succession was folded into an NE-SW aligned syncline, the Long Mynd Syncline. The axis of the syncline lies to the west of Long Mynd itself.

The 180m thick sequence of mudstones, siltstones and sandstones of the Burway Formation are overlain by a similar though thicker (670m) sequence known as the Synalds Formation. A sandstone referred to as the Cardingmill Grit Member is found at the junction of these two formations. The Synalds Formation which contains tuff bands towards the top, is overlain by the Lightspout Formation which is of a similar character and thickness. It contains a massive conglomerate known as the Huckster Conglomerate Member which is up to 18m thick. It has also been referred to as the Narnells Grit, a name deriving from Narnell's Rock where it outcrops.

The western part of the massif is formed from the roughly 1800m thick Bayston-Oakwood Formation, a suite of sandstones and grits which include mudstones, siltstones and some conglomerates.

=== Silurian period ===
The Precambrian rocks forming the Long Mynd massif are unconformably overlain on their southern and eastern margins by a suite of Silurian age sandstones and shales; the Pentamerus Sandstone, Purple Shales and overlying Bromsleymill Shale formations.

=== Quaternary period ===
As elsewhere in the Marches, a succession of ice ages during the last 2.6 million years have glacially modified the landscape of this area. During the last ice age as glacial ice covered much of Shropshire, a tongue of Irish Sea ice reached into the Church Stretton valley from the north filling it to a height of 260m. Like nearby Stiperstones and Long Mountain, the Long Mynd itself is not considered to have been over-ridden by ice during this ice age. The Onny Valley Glacier pushed around the southern margin of the Long Mynd; one of many lowland outlets for the Welsh Ice Sheet. A series of meltwater channels on the eastern side of the Long Mynd is associated with the wasting of the ice mass. After the retreat of the ice, downcutting of the batches and hollows continued during a prolonged period of wetter climate. A series of alluvial cones and fans formed from sand and gravel derived from this erosion, extend into the main valley. Downcutting continues today at a much reduced rate.

Today the steep and narrow valleys are covered in a thin layer of acidic soil, able to support only strong grasses, rushes and heathers.

From 2006, University of Cambridge scientists monitored seismic activity in the Long Mynd. The broadband seismometer was connected to the internet, and real-time traces viewable online.

== History ==
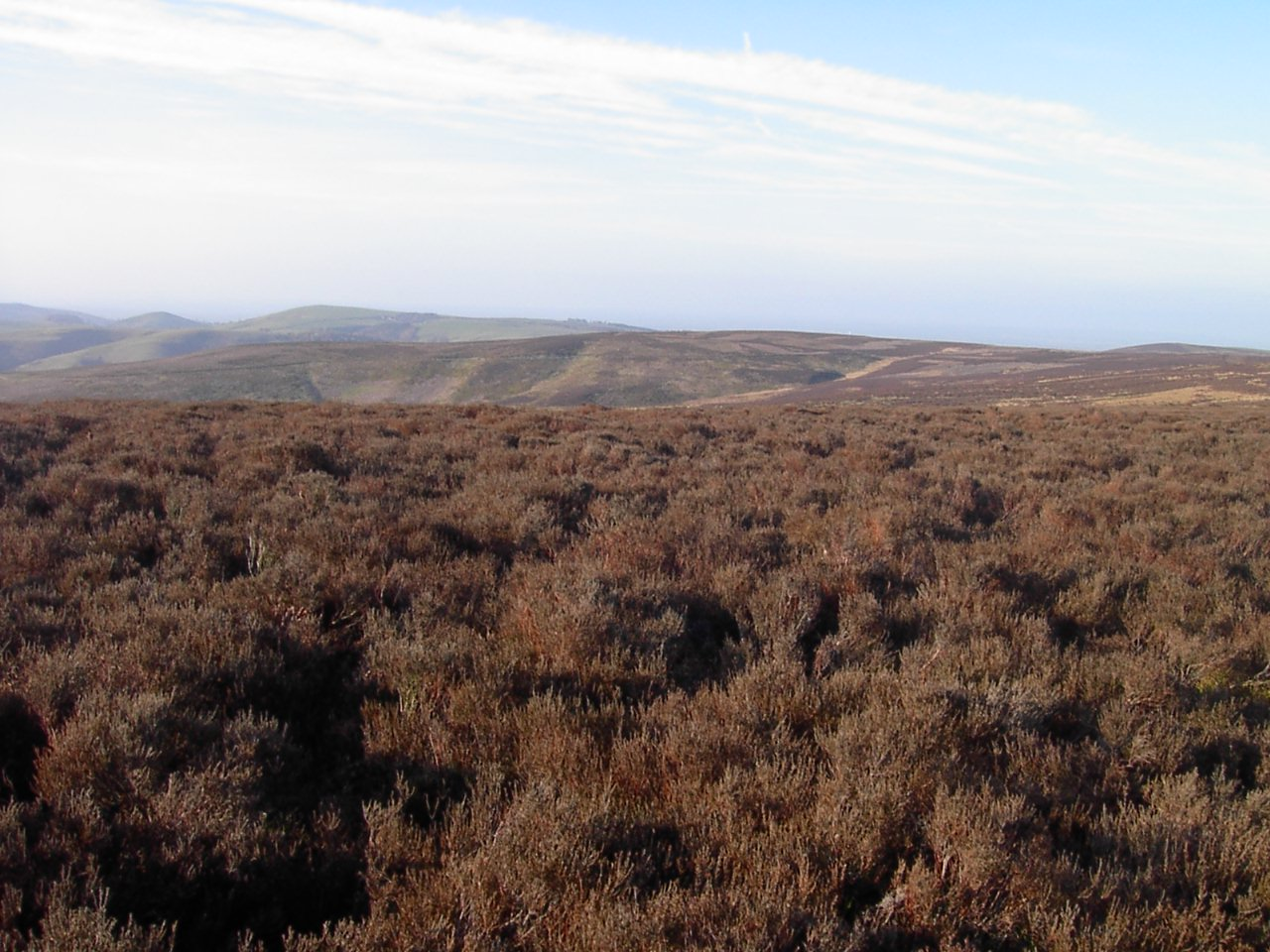
View from Pole Bank looking north

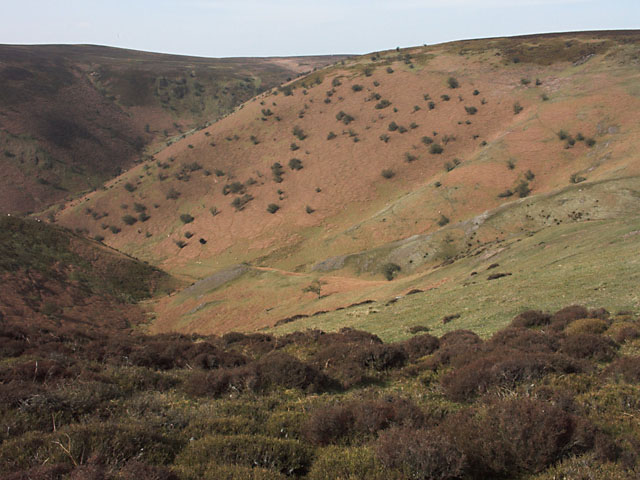
Barristers Batch on the eastern flank of the Long Mynd

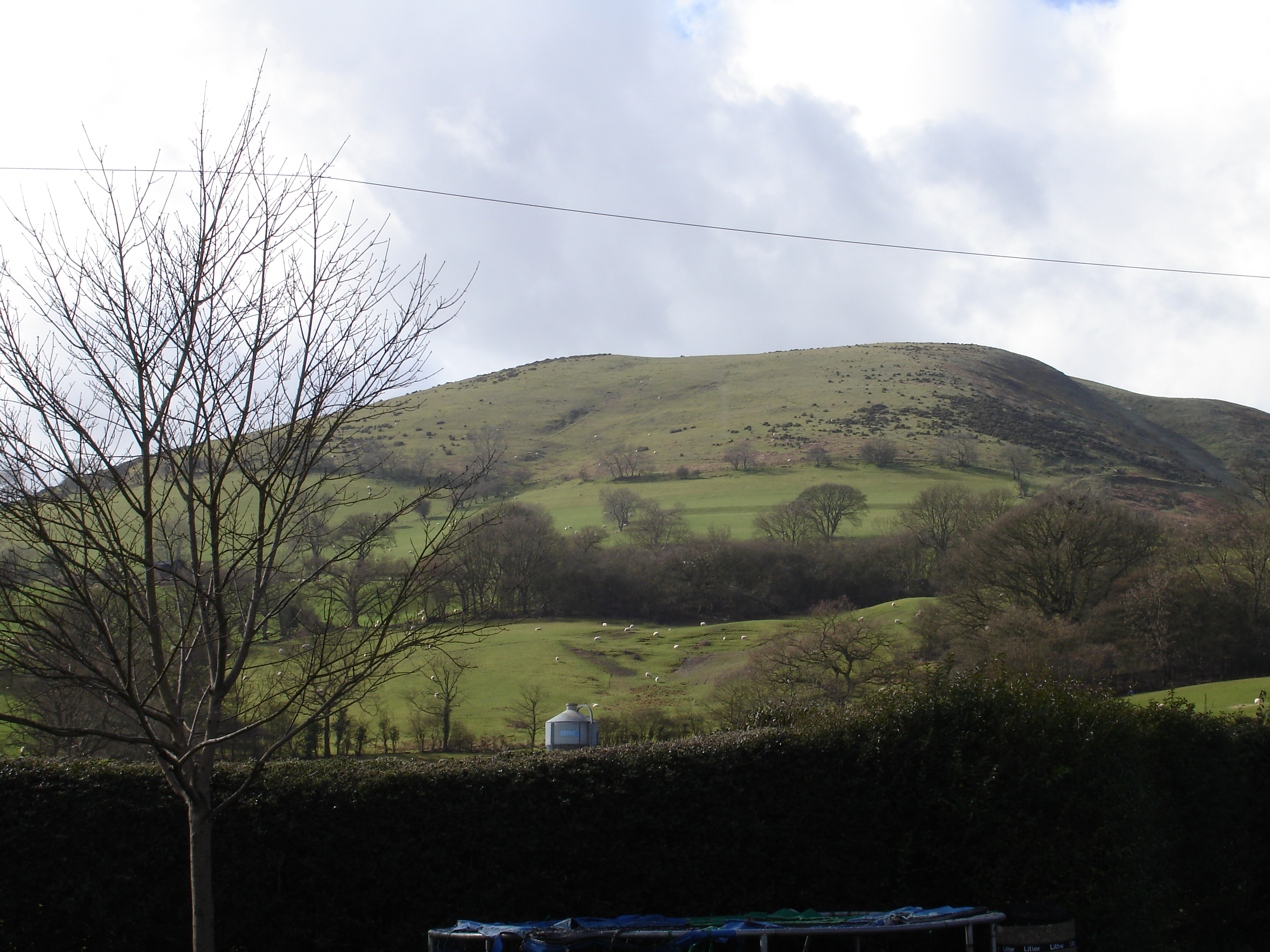
Long Mynd seen from below at Little Stretton

=== Bronze Age ===
Numerous sites are recorded from the Bronze Age on the Long Mynd including tumuli (also referred to as barrows), chambered tombs, dykes and cross-ridge dykes.

Barristers Plain Cross-Ridge Dyke runs southwest to northeast, almost in a straight line for 170 m (560 ft) across the narrowest section of the ridge between Grindle Hill and Round Hill. The heather-covered remains of the dyke are about 5.5 m (18 ft) wide, and 0.5 m (1 ft 8 in) high. On its western side it is fronted by a 3 m (10 ft) wide ditch. At both ends of the Cross Ridge Dyke, it fades into the steep hillside. A gap in the dyke, 60 m (200 ft) from the south-east end, is thought to make room for a trackway along the ridge. Its purpose was to cut off Grindle Hill from the main plateau, and to create a barrier to access from the west.

Devil's Mouth Cross-Ridge Dyke lies between Cardingmill Valley and Townbrook Valley. The dyke is 140 m (460 ft) long, but is cut though by the Burway road and a small car park, 35 m (110 ft) of the dyke is now missing. Both ends of the dyke end on steep slopes. It was built with stone and earth, and is 6 m (20 ft) wide, and 1.5 m (5 ft) high, with shallow ditches either side. It is roughly 1,500 years old. It was probably built to control the access along the ancient east to west route, which still crosses the Long Mynd today by means of a modern road.

At 380 m (1,250 ft) High Park Cross-Ridge Dyke is the longest on the Long Mynd. It is approximately 6 m (20 ft) wide, but in areas survives only as a crop mark. The highest point of the dyke, on the west side of the bank, stands at 1.2 m (4 ft) high, and reaches its widest point at 8 m (26 ft). A trackway, like that found on Barristers Plain Cross-Ridge Dyke, cuts through the dyke.

Of the Long Mynd Barrows, over twenty scatter the plateau. The best examples are in the northern area of the Long Mynd. Robin Hood's Butts barrow, near Duckley Nap, are two well known barrows, and the largest on the Long Mynd, being approximately 36 m (118 ft) in diameter and 4 m (13 ft) high.

The Shooting Box Barrow is named after a grouse-shooting hut that stood on the site until it was removed in 1992. It is the only known example of a disc barrow in Shropshire. 21 m (69 ft) in diameter and 2.3 m (8 ft) high, it is in the centre of a flat circular enclosure 54 m (177 ft) in diameter, the edge of which is defined by a 5 m (16 ft) wide bank, which has been partially destroyed by a modern path. It had been dated to c. 1950–1700 BC.

The Portway is an ancient trackway, which runs the length of the Long Mynd massif, and is the largest historical feature on the Long Mynd, at just over 5 miles (8 km) long. It is still walked today, and is part of the Shropshire Way, and a road that goes to the Gliding Club. A common misconception is that it goes over Pole Bank, but instead it bypasses the hill, following its contours.

=== Iron Age ===
Bodbury Ring is an Iron Age hillfort atop Bodbury Hill at 380 m (1,250 ft), overlooking Carding Mill Valley. Another hillfort sits on the nearby summit of Caer Caradoc. Bodbury Ring is now looked after by the National Trust. There is very little other human activity recorded from this period on the Long Mynd.

=== 18th century ===
During the 18th century, Church Stretton began to grow in the wide valley between the Long Mynd and Caer Caradoc, as a market town, and later a spa. Historically the town was known for its textiles, specifically in Cardingmill Valley. Carding Mill was built in the 18th century, and named after a stage in making cloth, the three stages being carding, spinning and weaving. Carding would have been done by children, and involved using a hand-card that removed and untangled short fibres from the mass of raw material. The cards were wooden blocks with handles and covered in metal spikes, which were angled, (to make it easier to untangle) and set in leather. When untangled, the material would be spun, and then weaved into the final product. The mill was irreparably damaged in a flood around the turn of 20th century. The factory that served the mill is still in the valley today, and after being turned into a hotel for many years has now been converted into luxury apartments.

=== 20th century ===
The Long Mynd Hotel in Church Stretton was built in 1901, originally as the Hydro, at a time when the town was popular as a spa.

A large area of the Long Mynd (almost all its upland area) was bought by the National Trust in 1965, and was designated an National Landscape as part of the Shropshire Hills in 1958.

== Highest points ==
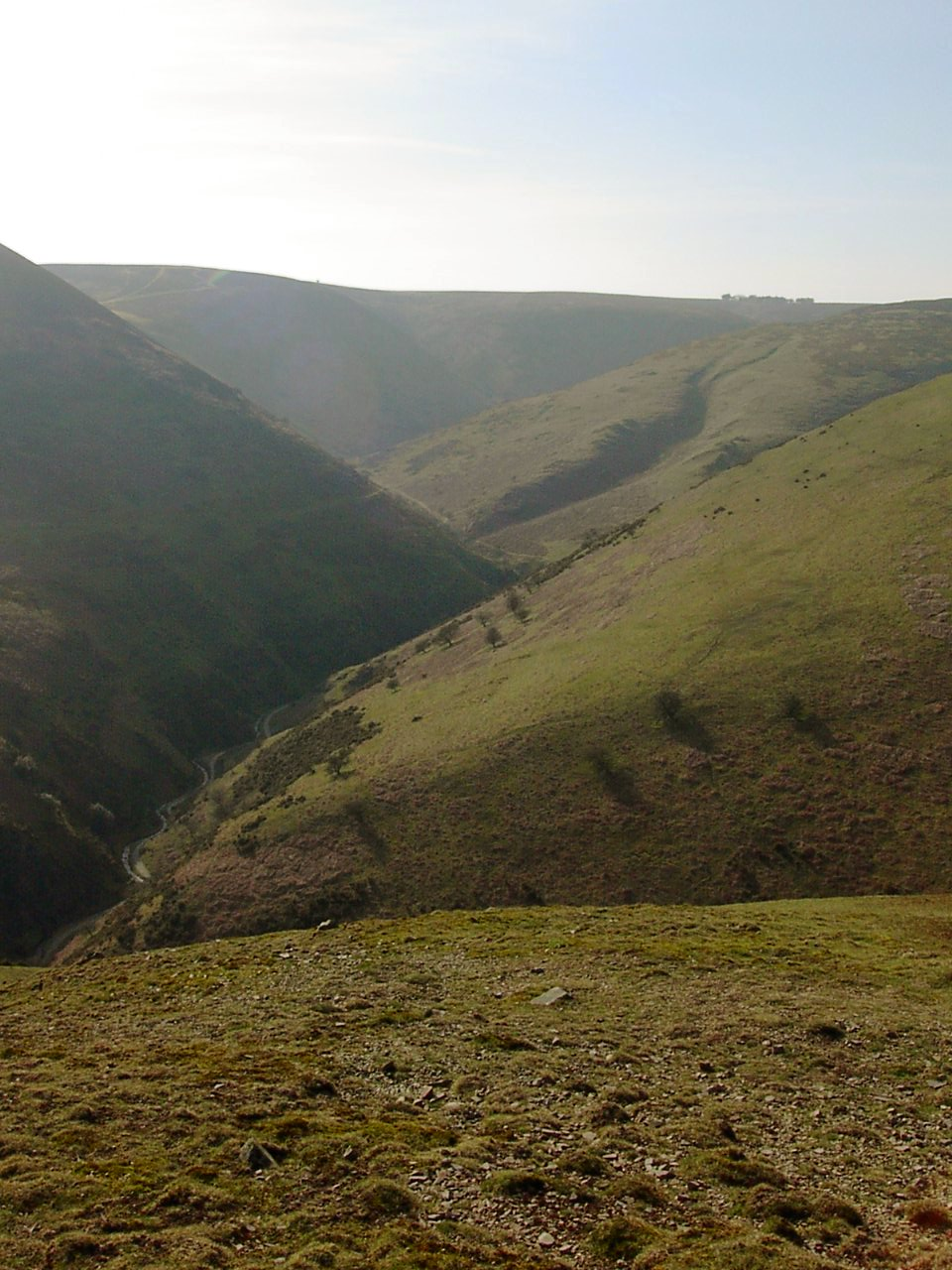
View up Ashes Hollow towards Pole Bank

The Long Mynd comprises many hills and moors. From the summit of nearly every hill, there are extensive views of the surrounding area and surrounding counties. North, one can see as far as Cheshire; west commands views over the Stiperstones, and into Wales; the Cambrian Mountains in Powys, notably the Berwyn range and as far as Snowdonia on clear days. The views east are obscured by other areas of the Shropshire Hills, Caer Caradoc, the Wrekin and the Clee Hills. From some locations there are views of the West Midlands. Views south are towards Clun Forest, Craven Arms and Ludlow. The highest points on the Long Mynd are as follows in order of highest to lowest, with comparisons of other nearby hills and the level of Church Stretton in bold.

- **Brown Clee Hill 546 m (1,791 ft)**
- **Stiperstones 536 m (1,759 ft)**
- Pole Bank 516 m (1,693 ft)
- Long Synalds 490 m (1,608 ft)
- Wild Moor 487 m (1,598 ft)
- Calf Ridge 468 m (1,535 ft)
- Haddon Hill 467 m (1,532 ft)
- Yearlet 465 m (1,526 ft)
- Round Hill 463 m (1,519 ft)
- **Caer Caradoc 459 m (1,506 ft)**
- Grindle 459 m (1,506 ft)
- Knolls 456 m (1,496 ft)
- Minton Hill 453 m (1,486 ft)
- Cow Ridge 450 m (1,476 ft)
- Packetstone Hill 437 m (1,434 ft)
- Nills 427 m (1,401 ft)
- Ashlet 415 m (1,362 ft)
- Black Knoll 415 m (1,362 ft)
- Callow 411 m (1,348 ft)
- **The Wrekin 407 m (1,335 ft)**
- Burway Hill 391 m (1,283 ft)
- Churchmoor Hill 394 m (1,293 ft)
- Bodbury Hill 388 m (1,273 ft)
- Priors Holt Hill 383 m (1,257 ft)
- Adstone Hill 369 m (1,211 ft)
- Shooters Knoll 365 m (1,198 ft)
- Stanyeld 334 m (1,096 ft)
- Novers Hill 305 m (1,001 ft)
- Castle Hill 218 m (715 ft)
- **Church Stretton 192 m (630 ft)**

== Valleys, hollows and batches ==
Long Mynd comprises a multitude of valleys, most of which drain to the east or southeast. They include:

- Ashes Hollow
- Barrister's Batch
- Bilbatch
- Broadhill Dale
- Burnalls Brook
- Callow Hollow
- Carding Mill Valley
- Catbatch Brook
- Colliersford Gutter
- Cwmdale
- Devilsmouth Hollow
- Gogbatch
- Grindle Hollow
- Hawkham Hollow
- Hens Batch
- High Park Hollow
- Jonathan's Hollow
- Light Spout Hollow
- Long Batch
- Minton Batch
- Mott's Road
- Mount Gutter
- New Pool Hollow
- Nut Batch
- Pike Hollow
- Rams Batch
- Sleekstonebank Hollow
- Small Batch (Little Stretton)
- Small Batch (Minton)
- Stanbatch
- Stony Batch
- Townbrook Valley
- Windy Batch
- Woolers Batch
- Yewtree Batch

== Tourism and recreation ==
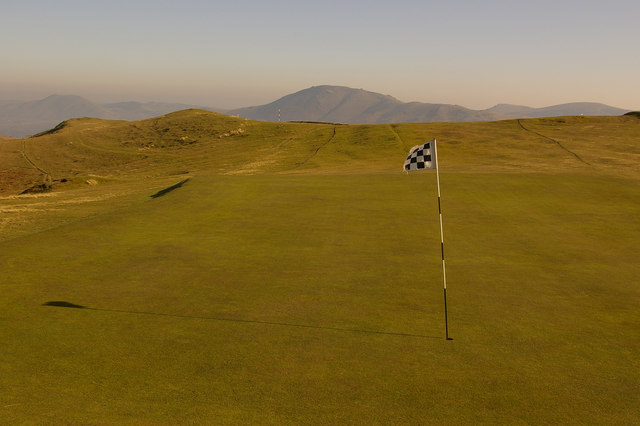
View from the highest green (10th hole) on the golf course.

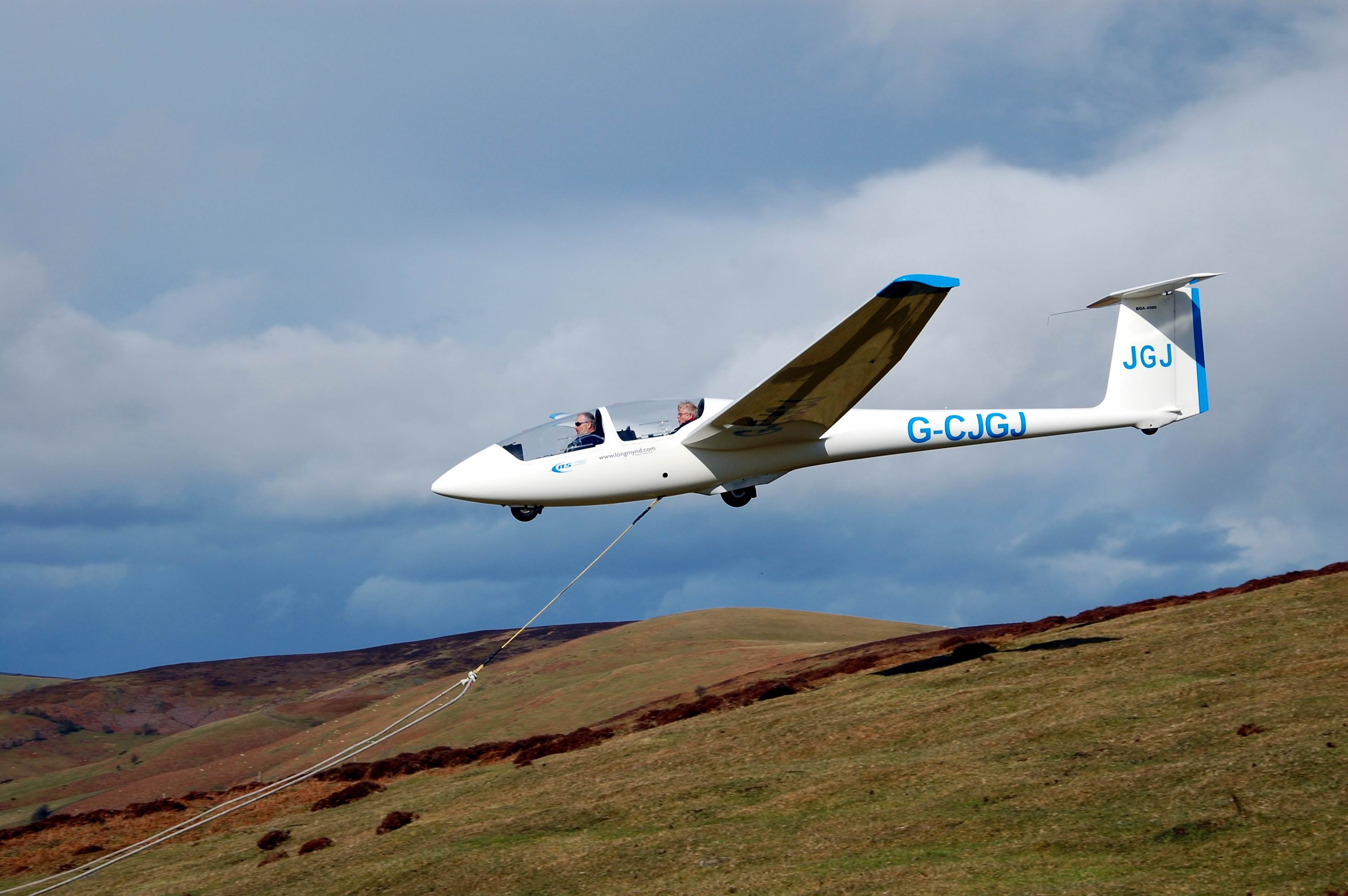
Schleicher ASK 21 glider being bungee launched from the Long Mynd

Long Mynd is part of the Shropshire Hills National Landscape and is a popular tourist destination, particularly due to the many footpaths, varied terrain and impressive scenery and views. Two promoted recreational trails are the Shropshire Way and the Jack Mytton Way. The Long Mynd's open spaces make it a popular place for horse riding and mountain biking on the bridleways.

Carding Mill Valley is the busiest location as it is home to the National Trust's centre for the area.

The windward slopes to the west are popular with glider, hang-glider and paraglider pilots.

In 2015, snow gates were installed at various points of access onto the Long Mynd to deter motorists planning to use the routes in wintry conditions.

The Longmynd Hike is a 50-mile (80 km) competitive race that crosses over the Long Mynd twice and must be completed in under 24 hours. It has been running since 1967 and takes place annually, usually on the first weekend in October.

There is a golf course, the Church Stretton Golf Club, located near the Cardingmill Valley, on the slopes of Stanyeld Hill and Bodbury Hill. The clubhouse is at approximately 230 metres (750 ft) above sea level and the hilly links course rises up to around 375 m (1,230 ft). It is the oldest 18-hole golf course in Shropshire, opened in 1898, and one of the highest in the country.

Cycle racing's British National Hill Climb Championship was held on the Burway, the road ascending the Long Mynd from Church Stretton, in 1989. The title was won by Chris Boardman, the second of his four National Hill Climb titles, who went on to win a gold medal at the 1992 Summer Olympics and have a successful professional cycling career.

=== Gliding ===
The Long Mynd has been home to the Midland Gliding Club since 1934, utilising the slope of the ground in a Westerly wind for gliders to continue flight (for many hours if required) in the rising air over and above the ridge, before "catching a thermal" (rising air under a cumulus cloud) and flying elsewhere, before returning to the Mynd at the end of the day so that a "road retrieve" of the glider is not required.

The club owns 136 hectares (340 acres) of land on the south end and flies throughout the year. It runs residential training courses and offers members of the public trial lesson flights, see Midland Gliding Club. Many long glider flights have started from the Long Mynd, for instance one of 750 kilometres (470 mi) during the summer of 2007.

The gliding club is one of the few remaining clubs in Europe to regularly launch gliders by bungee. One early distinguished past member was Amy Johnson, from 1937 to 1939.

== Flora and fauna ==
Historical grazing rights are held by the Long Mynd commoners who graze sheep and ponies on the land. The grazing livestock slow the invasion of trees by pushing into the scrub and bracken helping to create and maintain the heath. They also graze in the pools, eating the pondweed and consequently there is a healthy population of brown trout (Salmo trutta) and otter (Lutra lutra). Tree pipit (Anthus trivialis) and red grouse (Lagopus lagopus scotica) are found here as well as the recent arrival of the grayling butterfly (Hipparchia semele).

== Popular culture ==
The Revd E. D. Carr's A Night in the Snow describes his experience, in 1865, of surviving a winter's night on the Long Mynd when attempting to walk home after conducting a Sunday service and visiting an isolated parishioner. He spent 23 hours struggling to force a route to safety.

The Long Mynd features in literature in the poetry of A. E. Housman, the novels of Mary Webb (in particular Gone to Earth), Malcolm Saville's Lone Pine series for children, and Sheena Porter's The Knockers (1965).
