= Mediterranean stork's bill =

Mediterranean stork's bill is a common name for several plants and may refer to:

- Erodium botrys, known as Mediterranean stork's-bill in the British Isles
- Erodium malacoides, known as Mediterranean stork's bill in North America
