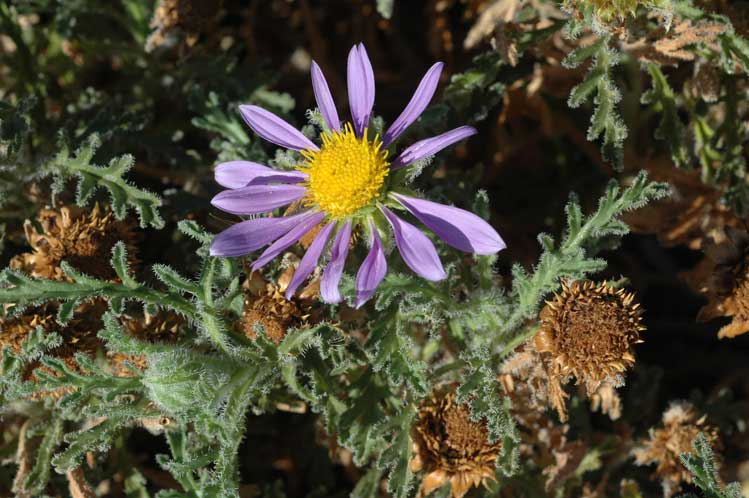
- Erodiophyllum elderi

Scientific classification
- Kingdom: Plantae
- Clade: Tracheophytes
- Clade: Angiosperms
- Clade: Eudicots
- Clade: Asterids
- Order: Asterales
- Family: Asteraceae
- Subfamily: Asteroideae
- Tribe: Astereae
- Subtribe: Brachyscominae
- Genus: Erodiophyllum; F.Muell.

Type species
- Erodiophyllum elderi F.Muell.

= Erodiophyllum =

Genus of flowering plants

Erodiophyllum is a genus of two species of Australian flowering plants in the family Asteraceae. Plants in the genus Erodiophyllum have pinnatisect, petiolate stem leaves, single, egg-shaped heads of daisy-like "flowers", and a glabrous achene.

== Description ==
Plants in the genus Erodiophyllum have pinnatisect, petiolate stem leaves and egg-shaped heads of pedunculate pseudanthia arranged singly on the ends of stems. There is a single row of spreading bracts and prominent scales on the peduncle. There is a single row of ray florets and four to seven rows of female, thread-like outer disc florets, the inner disc florets bisexual and tube-shaped. The fruit is a glabrous achene, the pappus composed of minute scales, fused to form a scalloped rim.

== Taxonomy ==
The genus Erodiophyllum was first described by Ferdinand von Mueller in his Fragmenta Phytographiae Australiae and the first species he described (the type species) was Erodiophyllum elderi. The name Erodiophyllum means 'Erodium - leaf'.

=== Species list ===
The following is a list of Eriodiophyllum species accepted by the Australian Plant Census as at May 2025:

- Erodiophyllum acanthocephalum Stapf - Western Australia
- Erodiophyllum elderi F.Muell. - Western Australia, South Australia, New South Wales
