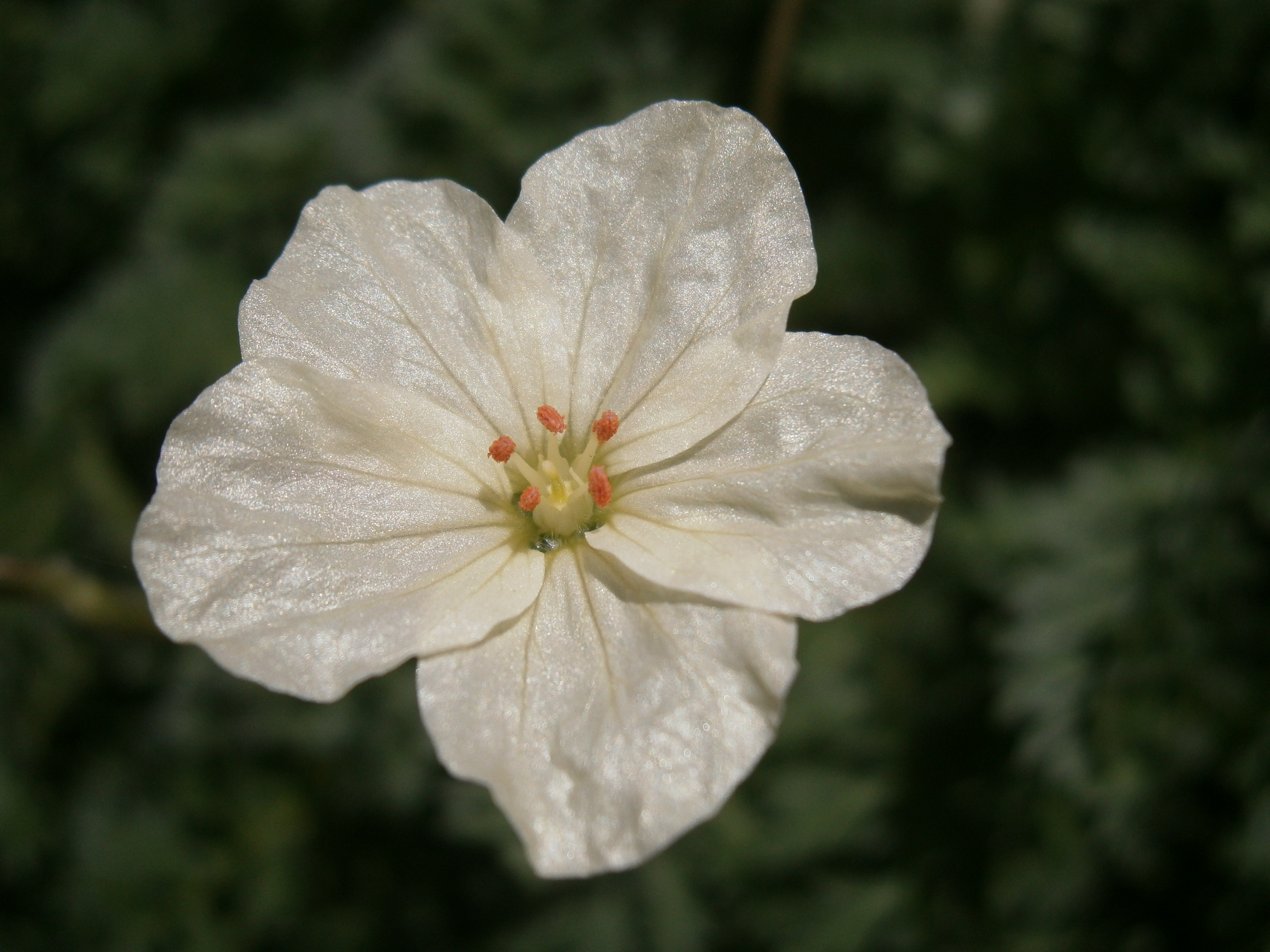
- Close-up of flower
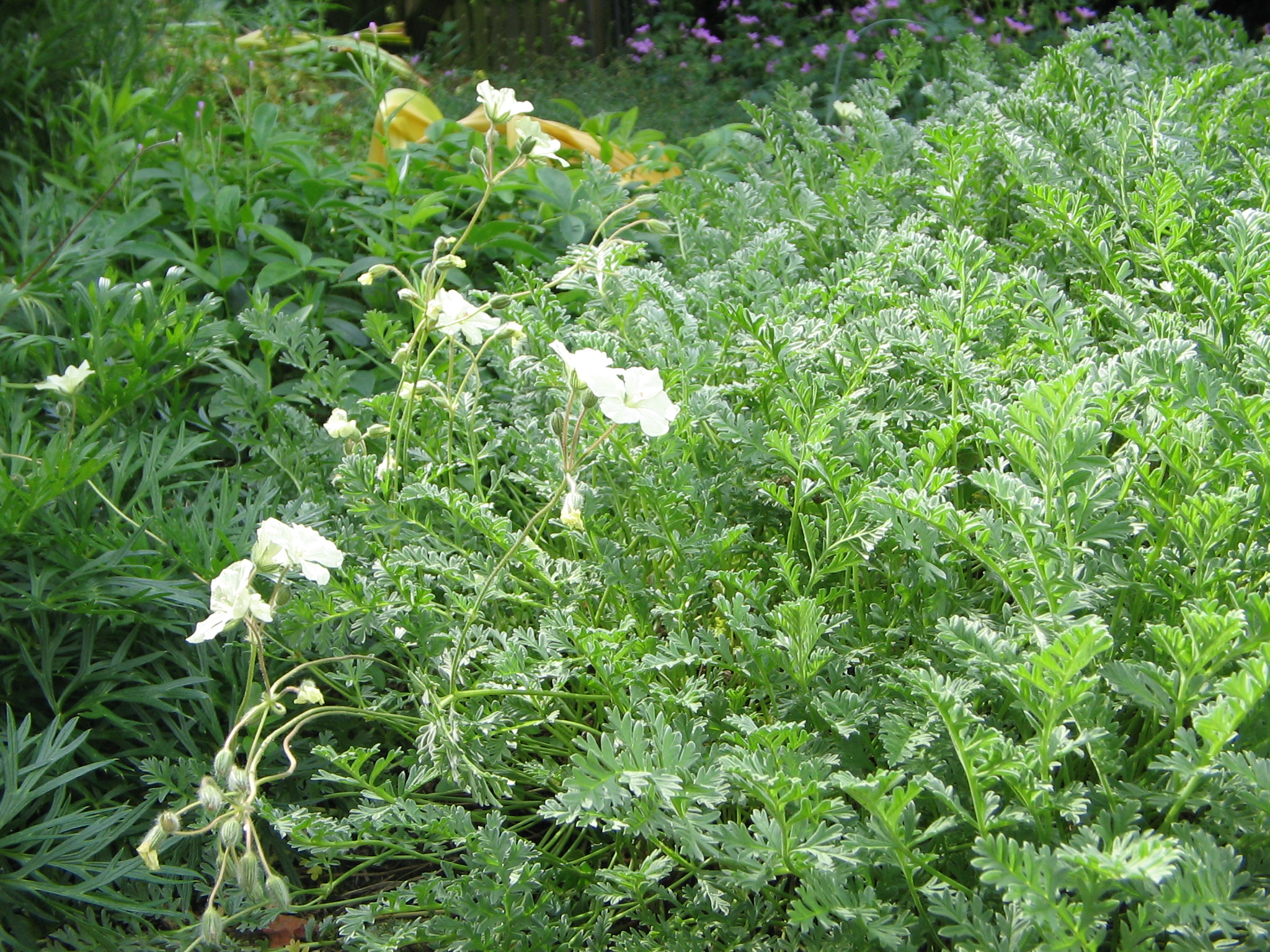
- The silvery-green leaves are finely divided and provide winter interest.

Scientific classification
- Kingdom: Plantae
- Clade: Embryophytes
- Clade: Tracheophytes
- Clade: Angiosperms
- Clade: Eudicots
- Clade: Rosids
- Order: Geraniales
- Family: Geraniaceae
- Genus: Erodium
- Species: E. chrysanthum

Binomial name
- Erodium chrysanthum L'Hér.

= Erodium chrysanthum =

Species of flowering plant

Erodium chrysanthum, the yellow heron's bill, is a species of flowering plant in the family Geraniaceae, native to central and southern Greece. The flowers are a pale yellow, or rarely a pale pink. A dioecious perennial, it is hardy in USDA zones 6 through 8, and is recommended for rock gardens, trough gardens, and borders.
