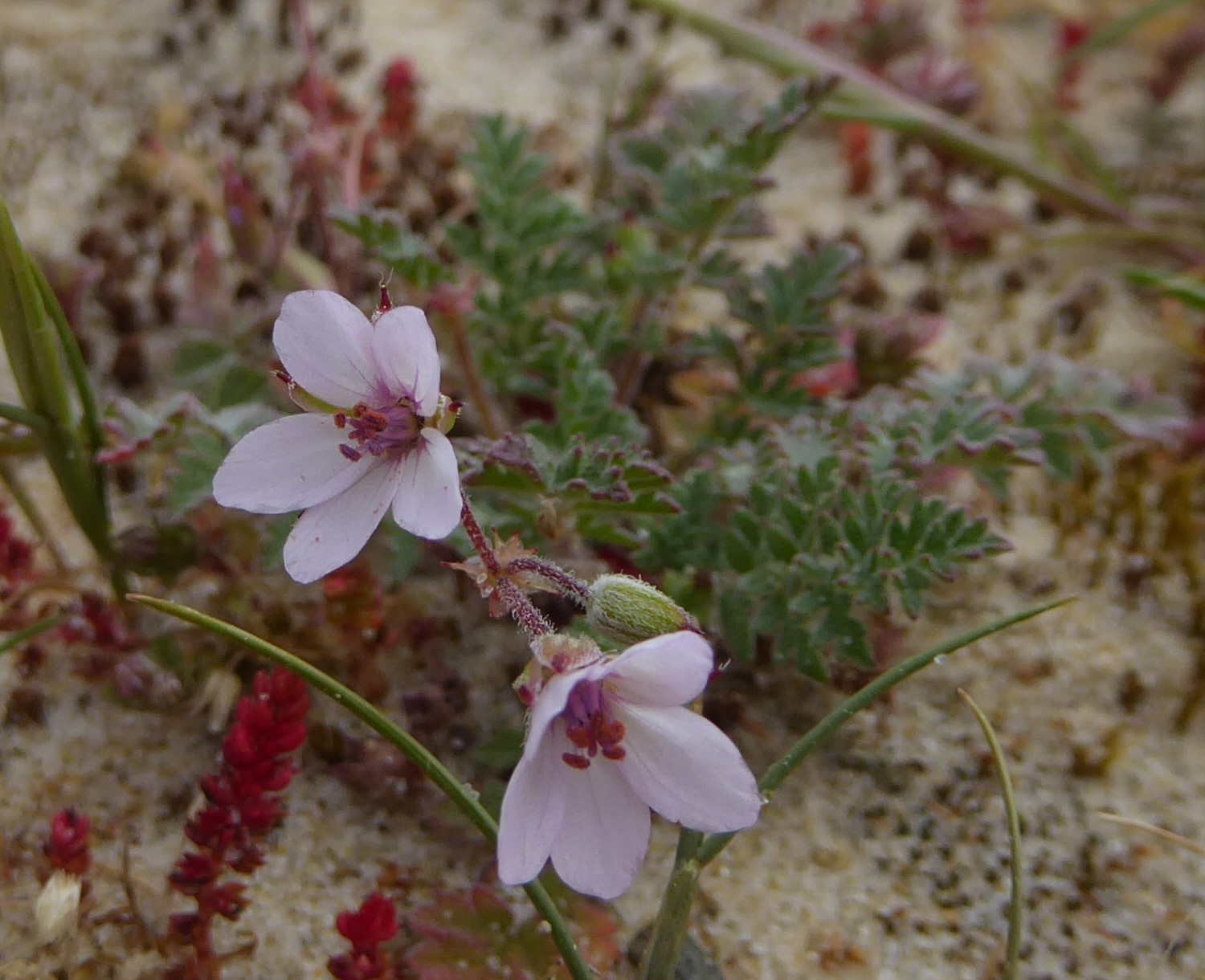

Scientific classification
- Kingdom: Plantae
- Clade: Tracheophytes
- Clade: Angiosperms
- Clade: Eudicots
- Clade: Rosids
- Order: Geraniales
- Family: Geraniaceae
- Genus: Erodium
- Species: E. lebelii

Binomial name
- Erodium lebelii Jord.

Synonyms
- Erodium cicutarium var. lebelii (Jord.) Nyman; Erodium aethiopicum (Lam.) Brumhard & Thell.; Erodium glutinosum Dumort.; Erodium cicutarium ssp. bipinnatum auct. non (Cav.) Tourlet

= Erodium lebelii =

Species of flowering plant

Erodium lebelii, sticky stork's-bill, is an annual plant in the family Geraniaceae. It occurs on sand dunes and heaths on the Atlantic and Mediterranean coasts of western Europe. Its taxonomic status is uncertain: some authorities consider it merely a variety or subspecies of common stork's-bill while others consider it to be the same as the north African species Erodium aethiopicum.

== Description ==
Sticky stork's-bill is an annual monoecious herb which typically grows in rosettes pressed flat to the ground, with a deep tap root that allows it to survive through the summer on dry soils. The stem is often very short, but can be up to 15 or even 25 cm long, green or reddish in colour, and covered in dense, glandular hairs particularly towards the top. The leaves are all or mostly basal, but are arranged in opposite pairs if the stem elongates. Each leaf is deeply divided or pinnate, with deeply incised segments (cut more than halfway to the base), up to 3 cm long, and covered in white hairs. The petioles are also hairy and are somewhat shorter than the blade.

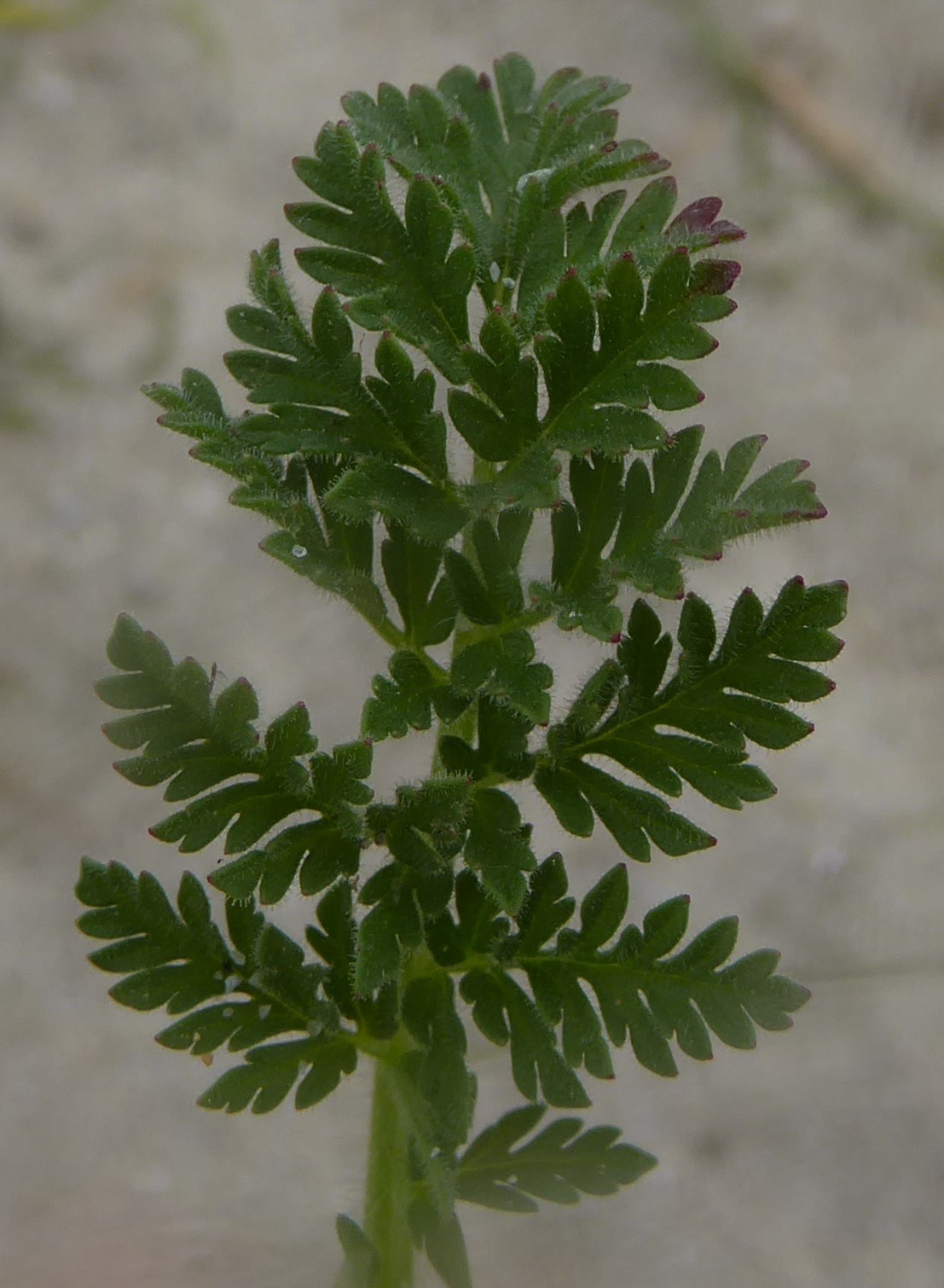
Detail of a leaf

There can be several inflorescences, which are umbels of 2-4 (sometimes 5) actinomorphic flowers, arising from the tops of the branched stem. The flowers are supported by densely glandular-hairy pedicels about 1 cm long. They are hermaphroditic, with 5 glandular-hairy sepals a few millimetres long and 5 white to pinkish petals 5 mm long. There are also five stamens and five carpels, which develop into fruits that look like a miniature storks bill. Each fruit is a schizocarp which breaks into 5 mericarps, each of which has a short (5 mm) basal segment containing one black seed, and a long (20 mm) beak that splits open at maturity to reveal a feathery appendage that enables the seeds to be dispersed by the wind. At the top of the basal segment there is a large, shallow pit that (unlike common stork's-bill) is not surrounded by a ridge and groove, but is partially covered by the long white hairs on the body of the mericarp.

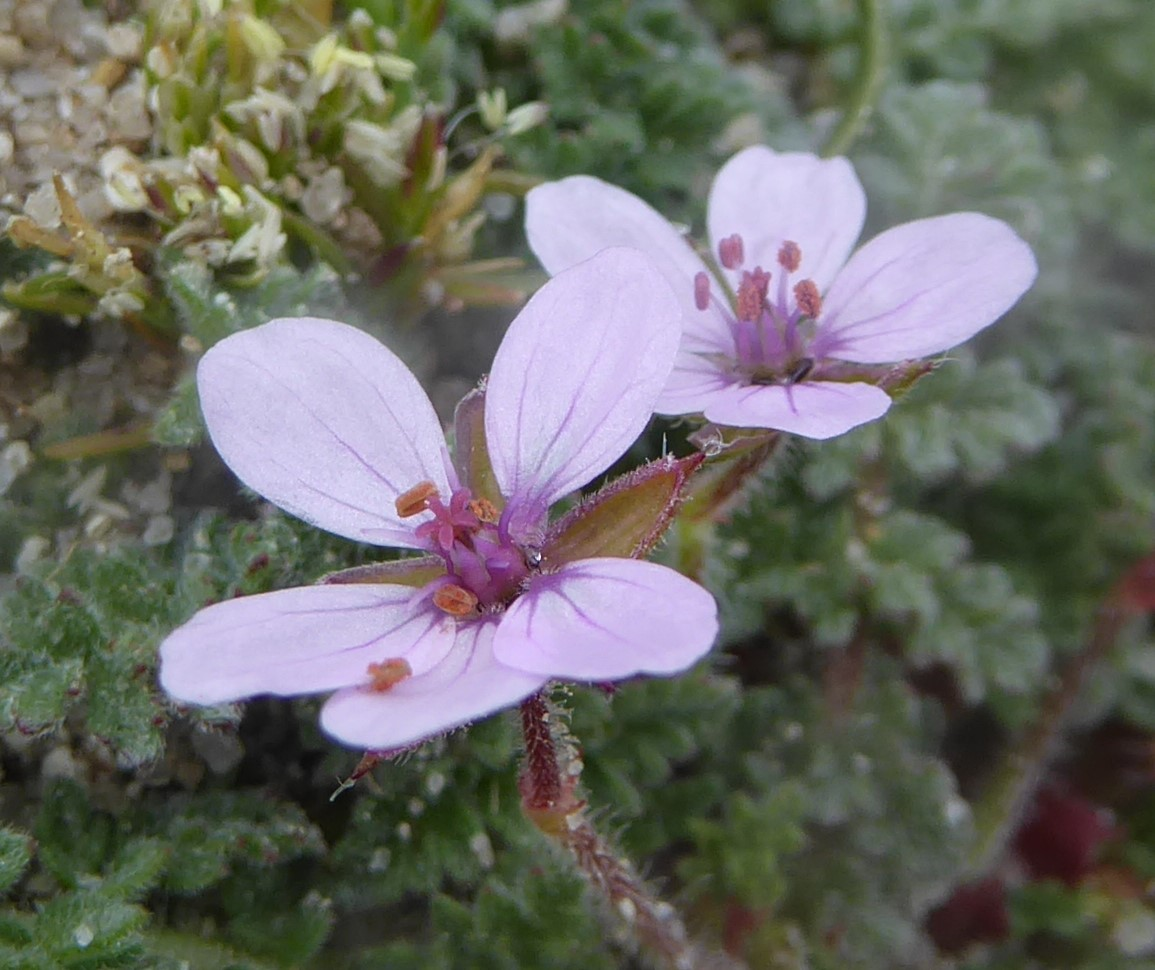
The flowers are pale lilac and unspotted.

== Identification ==
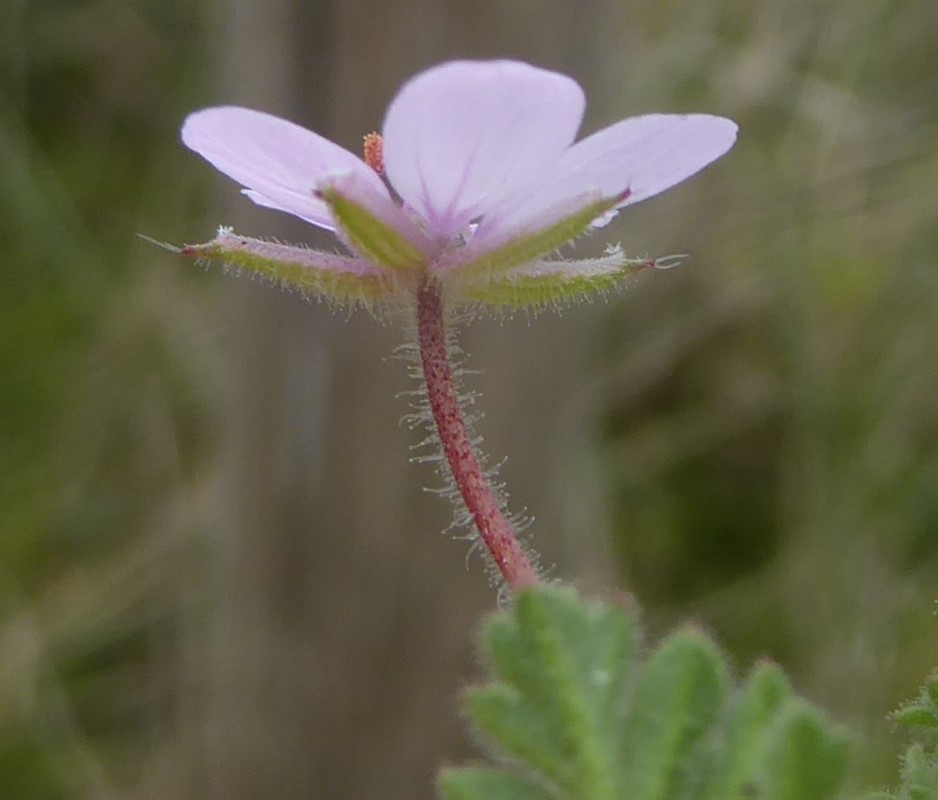
Glandular hairs on the pedicel and sepals is a key identification feature.

Sticky stork's-bill is very similar in appearance to common stork's-bill, especially the coastal variety of that species, E. cicutarium ssp. dunense. The key features to look out for are the dense glandular hairs on the pedicels and sepals of E. lebelii, the greyish appearance of its leaves, the pale flowers which are usually in pairs, rather than groups, and the apical pit of the mericarp, which is not surrounded by a ridge and groove. The petals must be unspotted. Confirmation can be made by a chromosome count.

Musk stork's-bill is sometimes very glandular and sticky, but the leaflets of its pinnate leaves are almost entire, and it has large, pink flowers.

== Taxonomy ==
The name Erodium lebelii was coined by the French botanist Claude Thomas Alexis Jordan in the Classe des Sciences publication of the Academy of Sciences, Literature and Arts of Lyon 1851, which is not currently available on the society's website. Although Jordan created an enormous herbarium, the type specimens are all British material, housed at the Natural History Museum in London. Over the years there has been much confusion about which stork's-bills should be considered species, but the currently accepted account was worked out by Charlotte Henriette Andreas (1910–1989) in 1947, although she used the name E. glandulosum for E. lebelii.

Its chromosome number is 2n = 20.

There are two subspecies of sticky stork's-bill: ssp. cicutarium is the common one, while ssp. marcuccii (Parl.) Guitt. is restricted to Corsica, Italy, Spain and Morocco.

It occasionally crosses with common stork's-bill to produce the hybrid Erodium x anaristatum Andreas, which is a vigorous plant that has showy flowers but produces few fruits, suggesting that it is sterile. It is usually found as isolated plants in places where both parents are present. The hybrid has a chromosome number of 2n = 30 (the other parent has 40 chromosomes).

The name of the genus, Erodium, is derived from the Ancient Greek word for a heron or egret, ἐρῳδιός (erodios), because of the shape of the fruits. The specific epithet was given in honour of the French explorer and botanist Jacques Eugène Lebel.

== Distribution and status ==
Sticky stork's-bill is almost entirely restricted to western Europe, where it grows mainly on the Atlantic coast from Germany to Spain, and on the Mediterranean coast in Italy, Corsica, mainland France and Spain. It probably extends to Morocco in North Africa, but there are taxonomic uncertainties about the more southerly plants. If Erodium lebelii is really conspecific with E. aethiopicum, then it also occurs along the whole Mediterranean coast of Africa.

Its conservation status globally has not been assessed, but in Britain and France it is listed as LC (least concern), although in Picardy, towards the northern edge of its range, it is classed as VU (vulnerable). In Germany it is classed as "not threatened."

In some counties in Britain sticky stork's-bill is considered to be an axiophyte, or species typical of valuable habitats, but in others, such as Cardiganshire, it is considered to be a casual that does not persist.

== Habitat and ecology ==
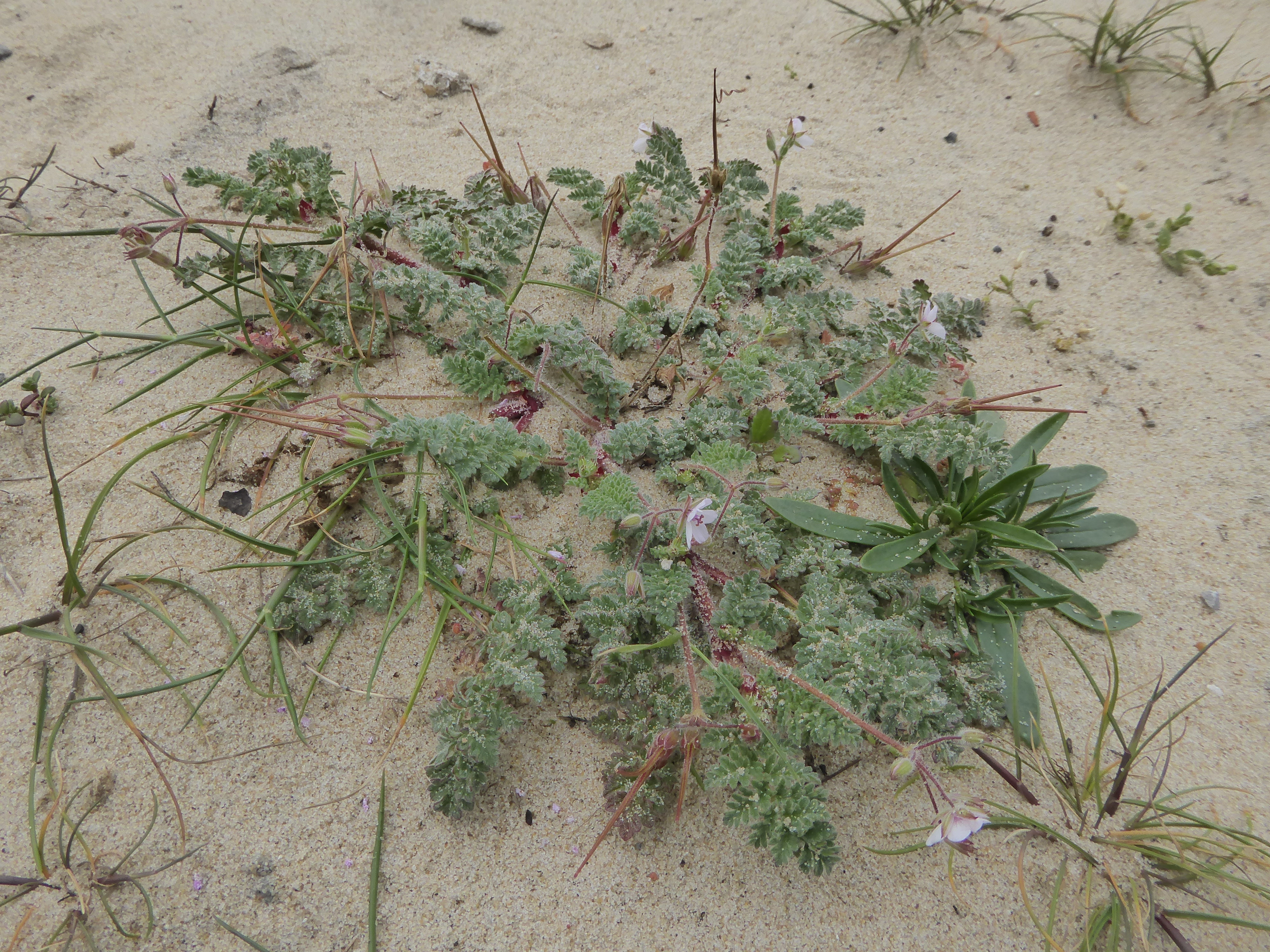
Typical habitat is in loose sand on coastal dunes.

The native habitat of sticky stork's-bill is on loose sand dunes by the sea. It is mesotrophic, calcifugous and xerophilic.

Its Ellenberg values are L = 8, F = 4, R = 7, N = 2, and S = 0, which suggests that it favours brightly lit places with low moisture, circumneutral acidity, low fertility, and low salinity.

There are as yet no known associations between insects and sticky stork's-bill.
