= Erodium brachycarpum =

Scientific classification
- Kingdom: Plantae
- Clade: Tracheophytes
- Clade: Angiosperms
- Clade: Eudicots
- Clade: Rosids
- Order: Geraniales
- Family: Geraniaceae
- Genus: Erodium
- Species: E. brachycarpum

Binomial name
- Erodium brachycarpum (Godr.) Thell.

Species of flowering plant

Erodium brachycarpum is a species of flowering plant in the geranium family known by the common names hairy-pitted stork's-bill and shortfruit stork's bill. It is native to southern Europe but it is known elsewhere as an introduced species and often a weed, such as the west coast of the United States where it is widespread in California and Oregon.

== Description ==
This annual herb grows up to about half a meter tall and bears lobed, hairy, petioled leaves with blades up to 10 centimeters wide. The inflorescence is an umbel of lavender flowers with five petals each about a centimeter long and often dark-striped. The fruit has a hairy base just over half a centimeter long and a style which may reach 8 centimeters in length.

This plant is very similar to Erodium botrys and is often overlooked as such, but brachycarpum is a smaller plant overall. Flowers are about a third the size of botrys, and the style is smaller than 80 mm rather than larger. Minor differences exist in the seeds themselves, as well.
