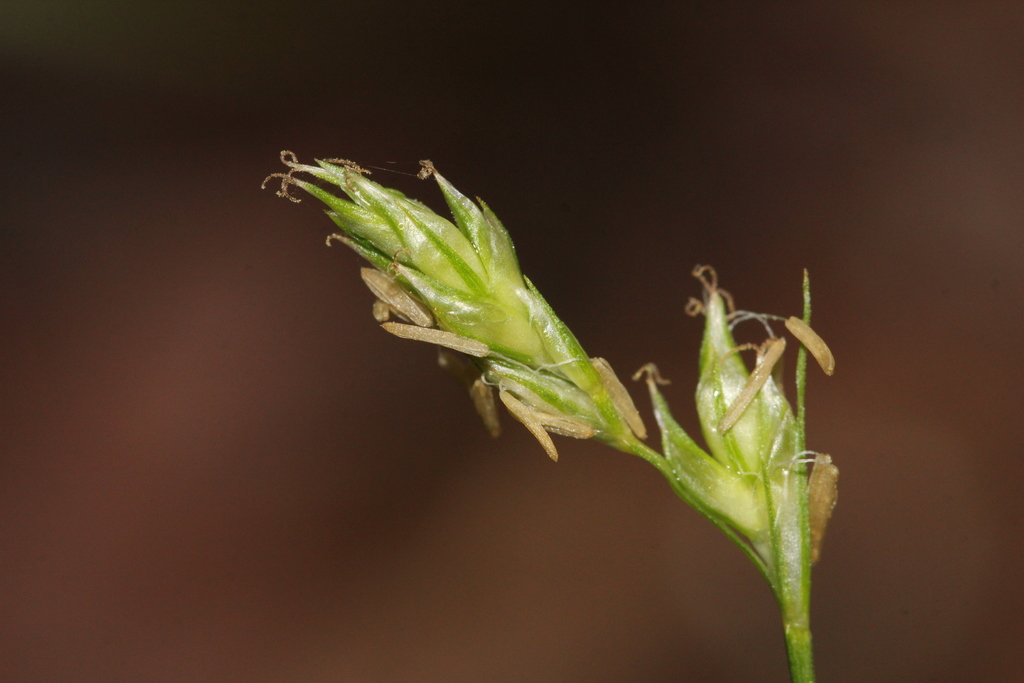

Scientific classification
- Kingdom: Plantae
- Clade: Tracheophytes
- Clade: Angiosperms
- Clade: Monocots
- Clade: Commelinids
- Order: Poales
- Family: Cyperaceae
- Genus: Carex
- Species: C. deweyana

Binomial name
- Carex deweyana Schwein.

= Carex deweyana =

Species of sedge

Carex deweyana Dewey's sedge, short-scale sedge, is a species of sedge native to Canada and the United States.

== Description ==
Carex deweyana grows in dense tufts, with relatively wide( .6 to 4.2 mm) leaves produced on shorter stalks near the base. Culms bearing the flowering spikes are longer, up to 100 cm long. These stalks fall outwards as the fruit matures.

== Range ==
Carex deweyana is native to central and northern North America. Populations to the southern part of the North American range are confined to mountainous areas.

The species has been introduced to Great Britain. It is infrequently found as a wool alien

== Habitat ==
Carex deweyana grows in association with trees. It is found in dry to moist sites.

== Ecology ==
Golden-crowned sparrow, Fox sparrow, Lincoln's sparrow, Song sparrow, and Dark-eyed junco have been observed in association with Carex deweyana, Carex deweyana is the host of the smut fungus Anthracoidea deweyanae, in the family Anthracoideaceae.

== Etymology ==
The specific name 'deweyana' commemorates Chester Dewey (1784-1867), an American naturalist.

== Taxonomy ==
The name Carex deweyana was first published in the Annals of the Lyceum of Natural History of New York, 1: 65 in 1824 in an article written by Lewis David de Schweinitz. The type locality of this species is identified as New England. Carex deweyana belongs to Carex sect. Deweyanae.

Carex deweyana contains the following varieties:

- Carex deweyana deweyana
- Carex deweyana collectanea

== Cultivation ==
Carex deweyana has been successfully raised in cultivation from wild seed. It is recommended for use in landscaping.
