= Erodium sosnowskianum =

Conservation status
- Critically Endangered (IUCN 3.1)

Scientific classification
- Kingdom: Plantae
- Clade: Tracheophytes
- Clade: Angiosperms
- Clade: Eudicots
- Clade: Rosids
- Order: Geraniales
- Family: Geraniaceae
- Genus: Erodium
- Species: E. sosnowskianum

Binomial name
- Erodium sosnowskianum Fed.

Species of flowering plant

Erodium sosnowskianum, or Sosonovskiy's heron's-bill, is a herbaceous plant, a species of the genus Erodium of the family Geraniaceae.

== Distribution ==
It is narrowly endemic, known in only two habitats in the mountains of Armenia.

== Taxonomy ==
The species was first described by Andrei Fedorov in the 10th volume of Notes on the Geography and Systematics of the Tbilisi Botanical Institute, published in 1941. It was named after botanist-systematics, researcher of flora of the Caucasus D. I. Sosnovsky.
