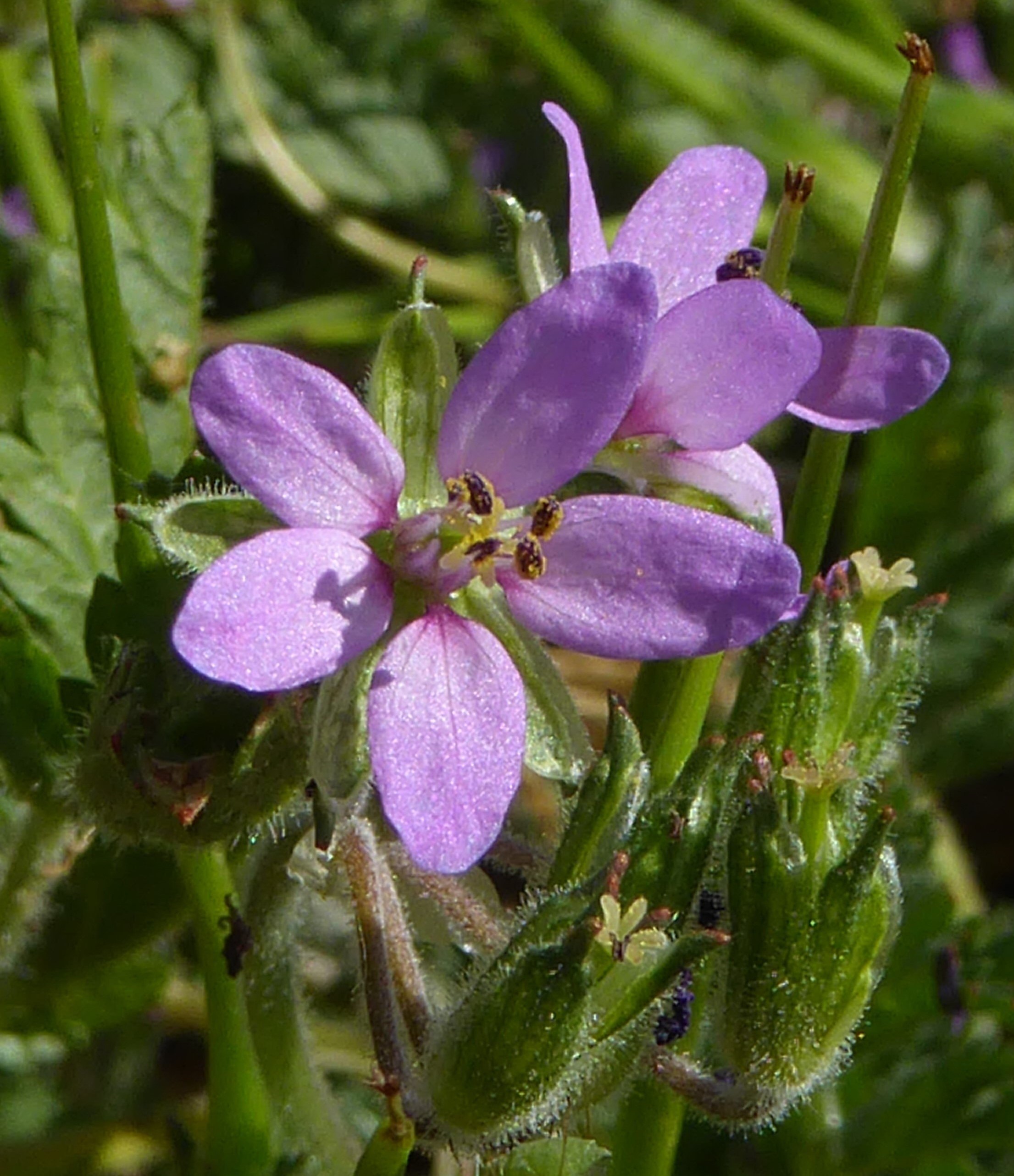

Scientific classification
- Kingdom: Plantae
- Clade: Tracheophytes
- Clade: Angiosperms
- Clade: Eudicots
- Clade: Rosids
- Order: Geraniales
- Family: Geraniaceae
- Genus: Erodium
- Species: E. moschatum

Binomial name
- Erodium moschatum (L.) L'Hér.

= Erodium moschatum =

Species of flowering plant

Erodium moschatum is a species of flowering plant in the geranium family known by the common names musk stork's-bill and whitestem filaree. This is a weedy annual or biennial herb which is native to much of Eurasia and North Africa but can be found on most continents where it is an introduced species. In North America, it is found in most of the northeast United States and in Washington, Oregon, California, and Arizona, as well as the Canadian provices of Québec and Ontario.

== Description ==
Musk stork's-bill is an annual monoecious herb which grows as a sprawling, procumbent to erect plant up to about 60 cm long or tall, with a musky smell when bruised. It is almost entirely covered with either simple or sticky glandular hairs except for the fruits and petals. The stems are green to purple in colour and bear alternate or opposite pinnate leaves up to about 10 cm long (up to 30 cm in very large plants). The leaf segments are serrated and lobed, but not deeply so: no more than about a quarter of the way to the midrib. The petioles are somewhat shorter than the blade, and have papery stipules up to 10 mm long at their base.

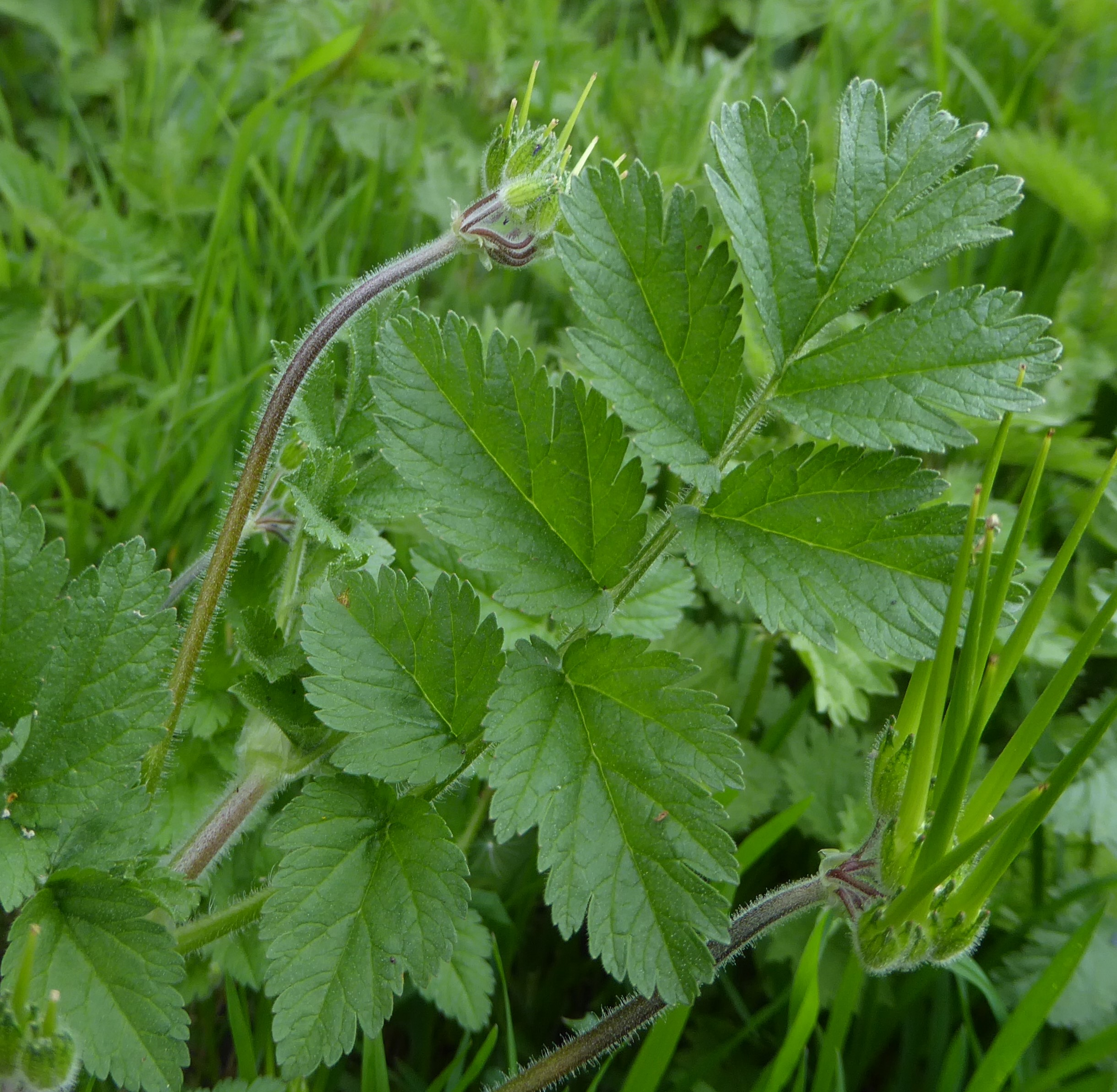
The leaflets of musk stork's-bill are generally only shallowly lobed.

The inflorescences are umbels of 6-12 flowers on peduncles up to 10 cm long. At the top of the peduncle are small papery bracts about 3 mm long. The individual flowers are actinomorphic and hermaphroditic, borne on short pedicels which elongate in fruit. There are 5 glandular-hairy sepals a few millimetres long and 5 pale purple petals about 7 mm long. There are also five stamens and five staminodes (sterile stamens) and just one style, with 5 stigma arms.

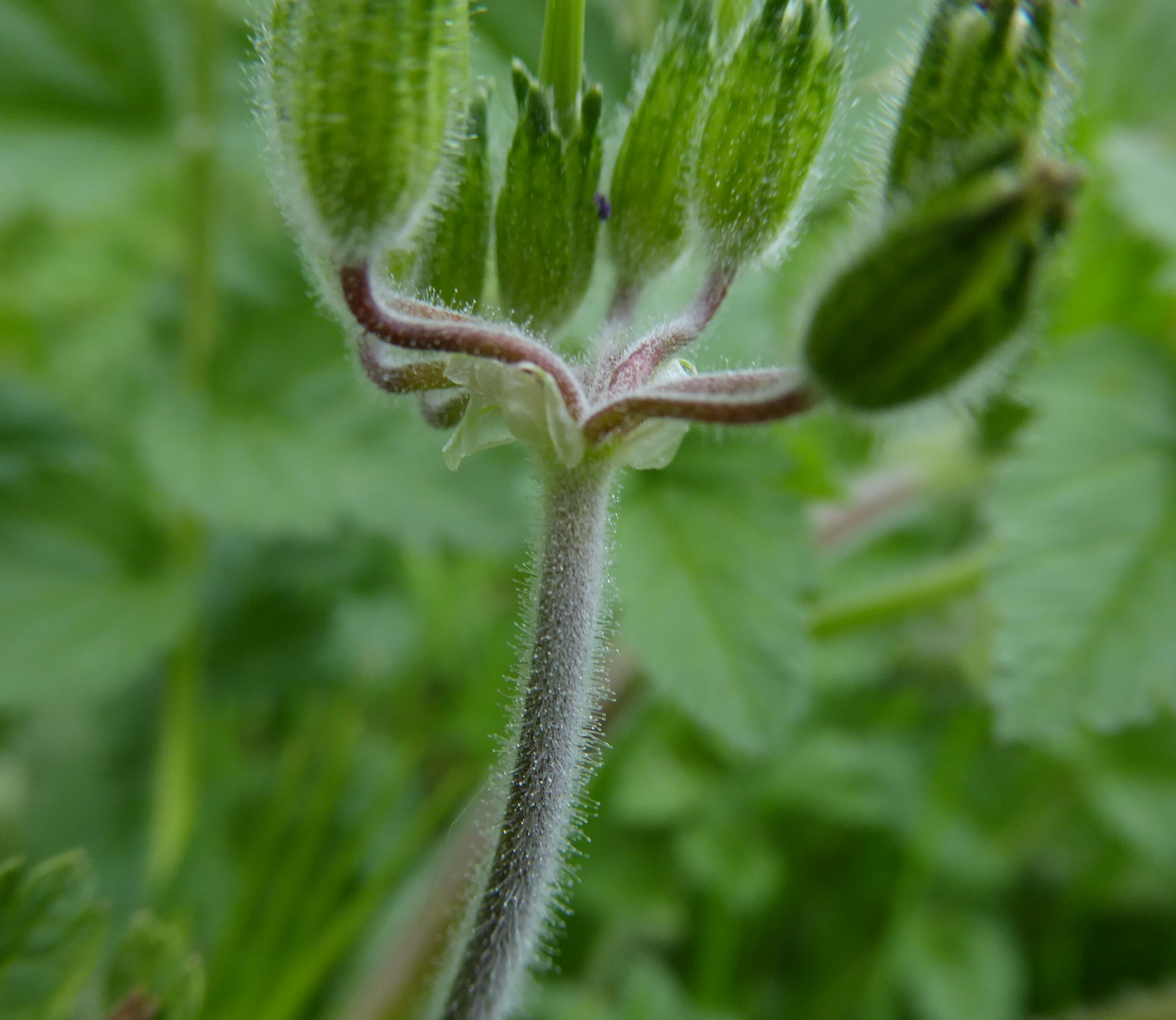
An umbel of musk stork's-bill, showing the peduncle, pedicels and papery bracts

The fruit is a schizocarp which breaks into 5 mericarps, each of which has a short (5 mm) basal segment containing one black seed, and a long (40 mm) beak that splits open at maturity to reveal a feathery appendage that enables the seeds to be dispersed by the wind. At the top of the basal segment there are two conspicuous pits with (unlike other stork's-bills) papillose glands inside.

== Identification ==
Musk stork's-bill is distinguished from other British stork's-bills by its smell, its once-pinnate leaves and the glands in the apical pits on the fruit.

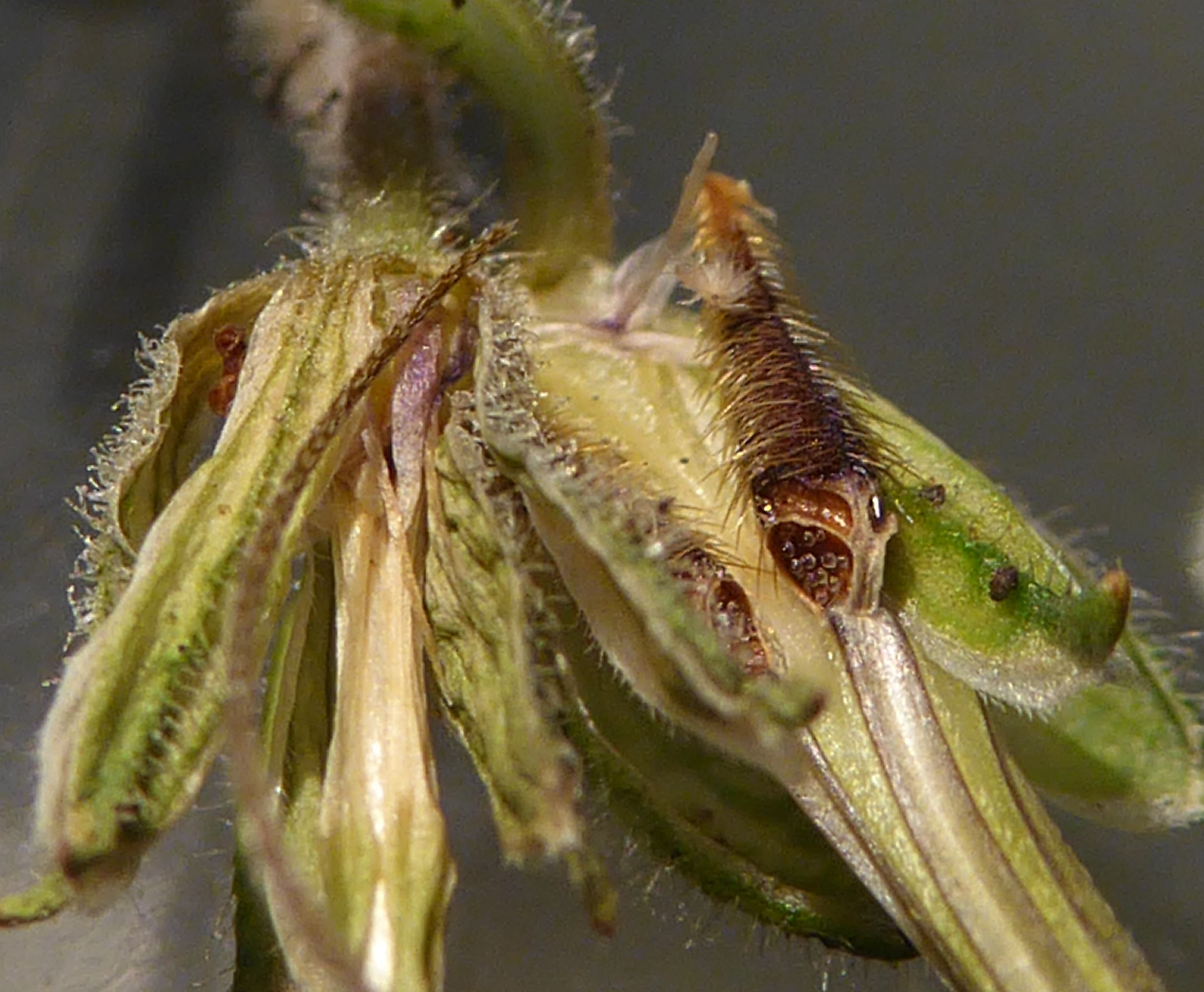
The glands in the pits on the mericarp are a useful identification feature.

The seed of the plant shoots out of the "bills" and commonly attaches to the fur of animals; this is aided by the coil-like form of the needle of the seeds.

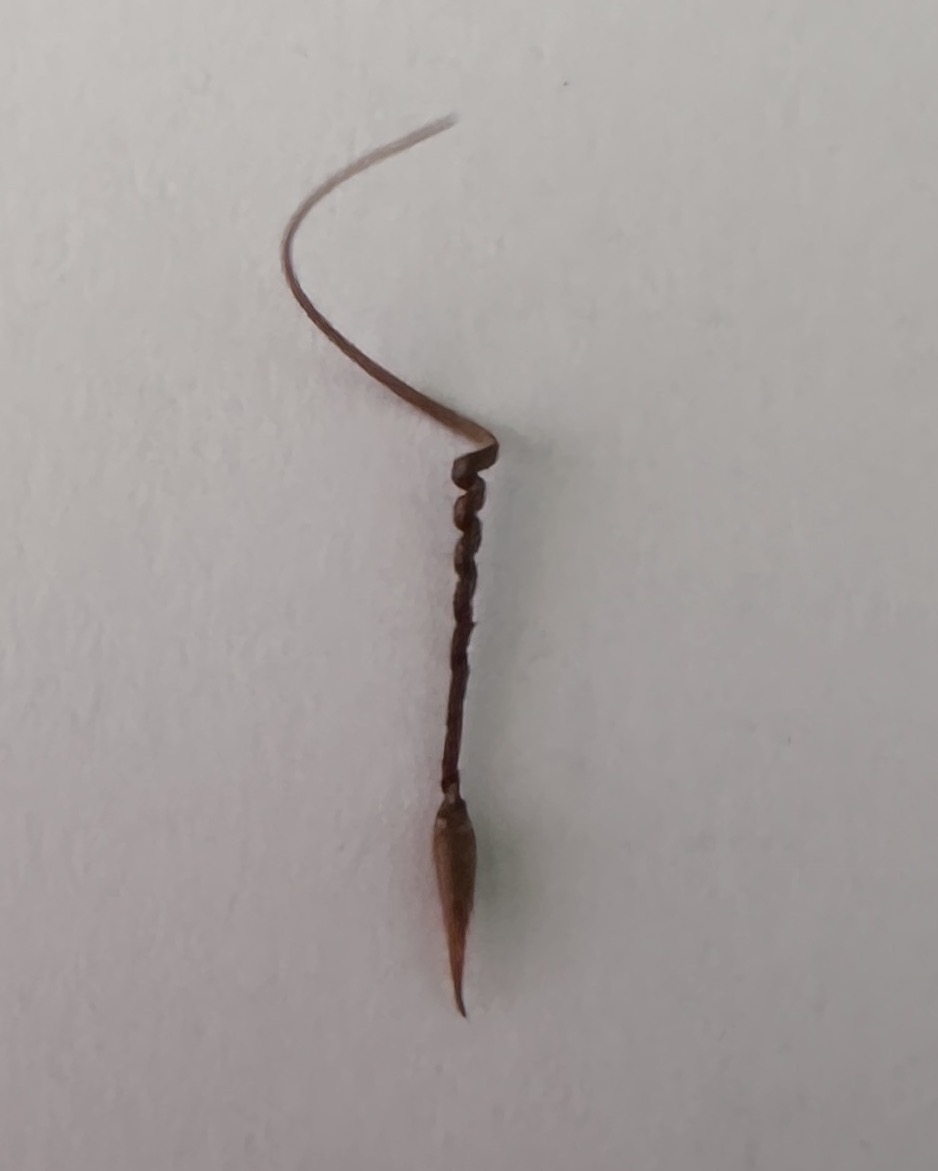

== Uses ==
Like Erodium cicutarium, the species is edible.

== Ecology ==
Several species of insects have been recorded on musk stork's-bill, including the midge Dasineura erodiicola, which causes galls on the flowers. Two moths are recorded feeding on the leaves: the Setaceous Hebrew character and Thaumetopoea herculeana, as is the weevil Donus dauci and the green peach aphid.

Two types of mildew infest the leaves: Podosphaera erodii and Peronospora erodii, and pustules on the leaves can be caused by the rust Synchytrium papillatum.

Other pests include the leaf miner Agromyza nigrescens, the aphid Acyrthosiphon malvae, the leaf beetle Aphthona pallida, which feeds on the roots, and the weevil Zacladus exiguus, which bores into the root collar.
