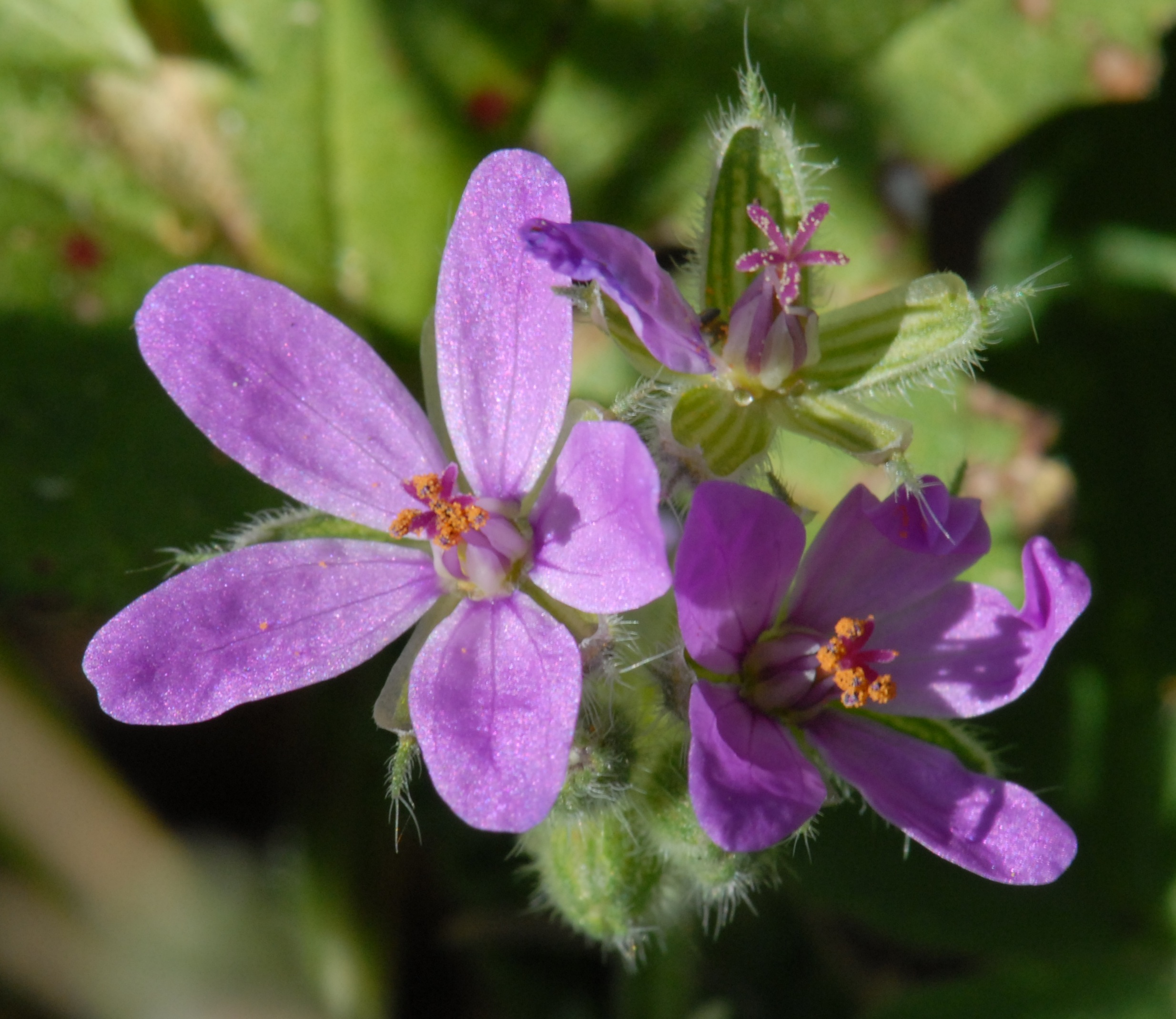

Scientific classification
- Kingdom: Plantae
- Clade: Tracheophytes
- Clade: Angiosperms
- Clade: Eudicots
- Clade: Rosids
- Order: Geraniales
- Family: Geraniaceae
- Genus: Erodium
- Species: E. chium

Binomial name
- Erodium chium (L.) Willd.

= Erodium chium =

Species of plant

Erodium chium is an annual herbaceous plant belonging to the Geraniaceae family. It is found primarily in countries around the Mediterranean Sea. Like most members of the Erodium genus, it is commonly referred to as a “Storkbill”, specifically the “Three-lobed Stork’s-bill” or the “Mediterranean Storkbill”.

== Description ==
Erodium chium is an annual, caulescent herb that has stems 5-50cm long covered in fine hairs. Its leaves are ovate shaped and can be in alternate, subopposite, or opposite arrangements and the edges may be slightly toothed or divided into shallow lobes. They grow on relatively long stalks and have visible veins.

Flowers are arranged on umbels with 2-8 flowers. The flowers have 5-7 sepals and 5-8 petals. The petals range from pink to purple in coloration and are 5-8 x 2-3mm. It has 3 or more bracts that are ovate, straw colored, and scarious.

After flowering, the plant develops dry fruits that split into individual mericarps. The mericarps have a 3-5 mm long, apical pit head and a tail 30-40 mm long. The seeds are relatively small, measuring around 2-3mm.

The plant’s flowering takes place from August to December, peaking in September and October. Fruiting lasts from September to December.

== Distribution and habitat ==
Erodium chium is native to the Mediterranean area, ranging from Portugal and Morocco to Turkey and the Middle East. It prefers sandy soil and is mostly found around the dunes of the seashore, though it is sometimes found in shaded mountain regions.

== Etymology ==
The word Erodium comes from the Greek word erodios, meaning "heron." This name refers to the plant's long, pointed fruits, which resemble the beak of a heron. This characteristic has also influenced common names used for plants in the genus, including "heron's-bill and storksbill."

The name chium is associated with the Greek island of Chios, which was historically also known as "Chium". The species was first described by Carl Linnaeus in 1759 under the name Geranium chium. It was later reclassified by botanist Carl Ludwig Willdenow, who placed it in the genus Erodium in 1794. This change established the scientific name currently used today. The botanical author abbreviation "(L.) Willd." reflects this history, with "L." referring to Linnaeus and "Willd." referring to Wildenow.

== Sources ==
This article incorporates text from a free content work. Licensed under CC0 (license statement/permission). Text taken from Erodium chium. Encyclopedia of Life.
