= Erodium hendrikii =

Scientific classification
- Kingdom: Plantae
- Clade: Tracheophytes
- Clade: Angiosperms
- Clade: Eudicots
- Clade: Rosids
- Order: Geraniales
- Family: Geraniaceae
- Genus: Erodium
- Species: E. hendrikii

Binomial name
- Erodium hendrikii Alpınar

Species of plant

Erodium hendrikii, or heron's bill, is a plant in the Geraniaceae family. It is critically endangered.

== Distribution ==
It is native to Turkey.

== Taxonomy ==
It was named by Kerim Alpınar in Edinburgh J. Botany, 51: 68, in 1994.
