= Erodium laciniatum =

Scientific classification
- Kingdom: Plantae
- Clade: Tracheophytes
- Clade: Angiosperms
- Clade: Eudicots
- Clade: Rosids
- Order: Geraniales
- Family: Geraniaceae
- Genus: Erodium
- Species: E. laciniatum

Binomial name
- Erodium laciniatum (Cav.) Willd.

Synonyms
- Erodium chium var. laciniatum

Species of plant

Erodium laciniatum is a species of flowering plant in the family Geraniaceae.

== Sources ==
This article incorporates text from a free content work. Licensed under CC0 (license statement/permission). Text taken from Erodium laciniatum. Encyclopedia of Life.
