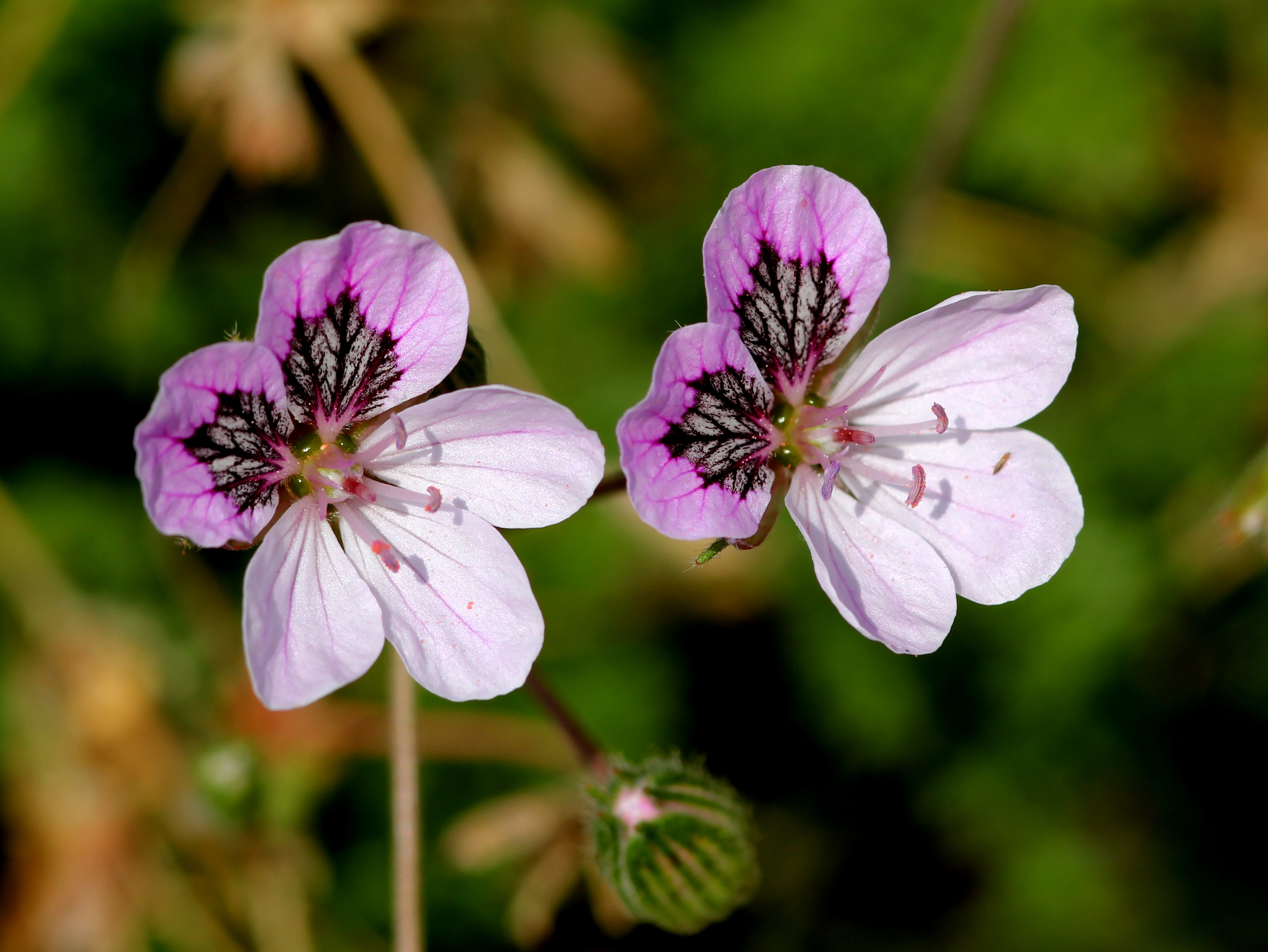
- Flowers

Scientific classification
- Kingdom: Plantae
- Clade: Embryophytes
- Clade: Tracheophytes
- Clade: Angiosperms
- Clade: Eudicots
- Clade: Rosids
- Order: Geraniales
- Family: Geraniaceae
- Genus: Erodium
- Species: E. glandulosum

Binomial name
- Erodium glandulosum (Cav.) Willd.

Synonyms
- List: Erodium foetidum subsp. glandulosum (Cav.) O.Bolòs & Vigo; Erodium foetidum subsp. lucidum (Lapeyr.) O.Bolòs & Vigo; Erodium graveolens Lapeyr.; Erodium lucidum Lapeyr.; Erodium macradenum L'Hér.; Erodium paularense Fern.Gonz. & Izco; Erodium radicatum Lapeyr.; Geranium glandulosum Cav.; Geranium radicatum Lapeyr.

= Erodium glandulosum =

Species of flowering plant

Erodium glandulosum, called the black-eyed heron's bill, is a species of flowering plant in the genus Erodium, native to the Pyrenees. It has gained the Royal Horticultural Society's Award of Garden Merit.

== Subtaxa ==
The following subspecies are currently accepted:

- Erodium glandulosum subsp. glandulosum
- Erodium glandulosum subsp. paularense (Fern.Gonz. & Izco) Guitt.
