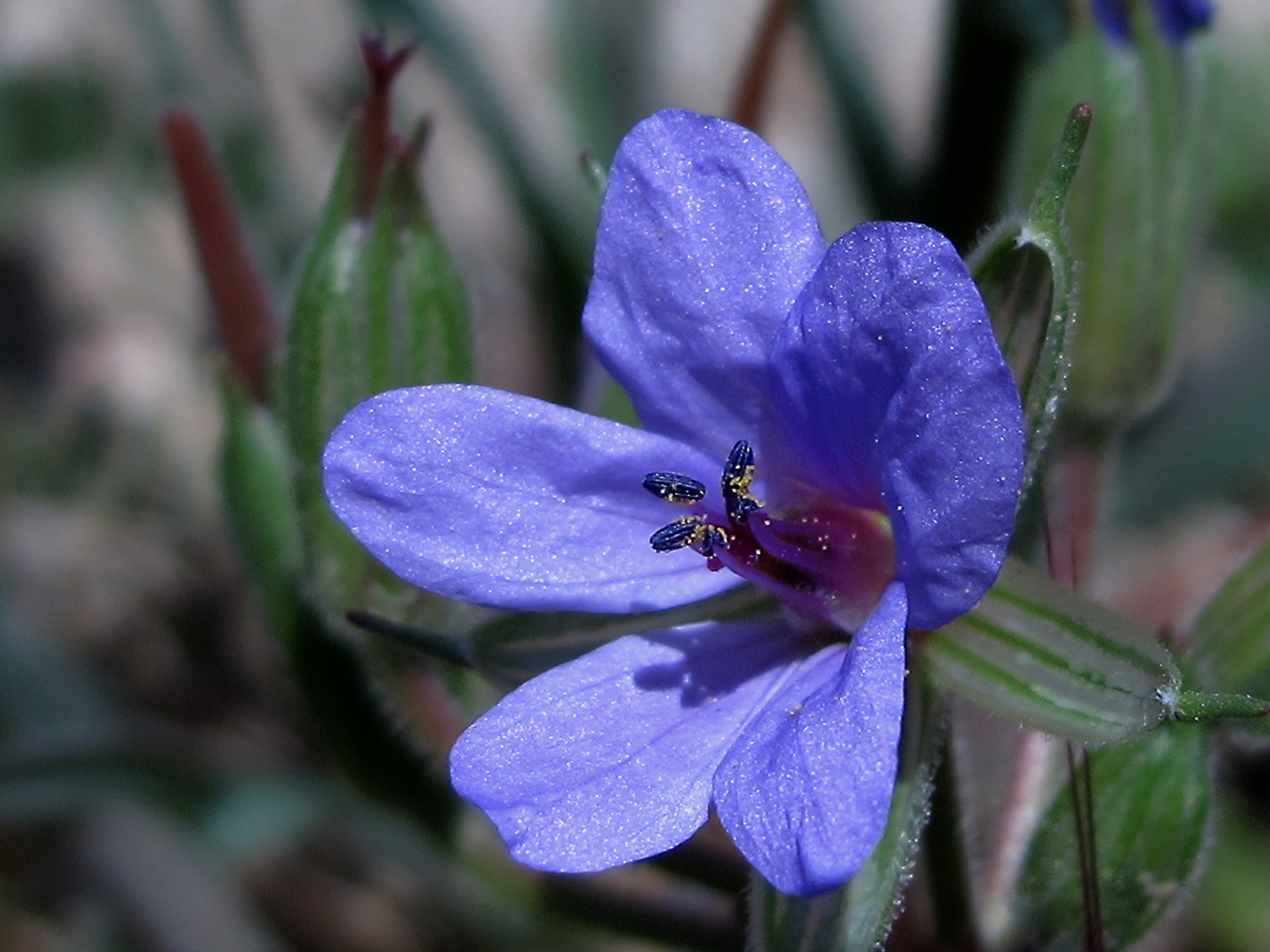

Scientific classification
- Kingdom: Plantae
- Clade: Tracheophytes
- Clade: Angiosperms
- Clade: Eudicots
- Clade: Rosids
- Order: Geraniales
- Family: Geraniaceae
- Genus: Erodium
- Species: E. ciconium

Binomial name
- Erodium ciconium (L.) L'Hér.

Synonyms
- Erodium viscosum

= Erodium ciconium =

Species of plant

Erodium ciconium, the common stork's bill, is a species of annual herb in the family Geraniaceae. They have a self-supporting growth form and simple, broad leaves. Individuals can grow to 21 cm tall.

== Sources ==
This article incorporates text from a free content work. Licensed under CC0 (license statement/permission). Text taken from Erodium ciconium. Encyclopedia of Life.
