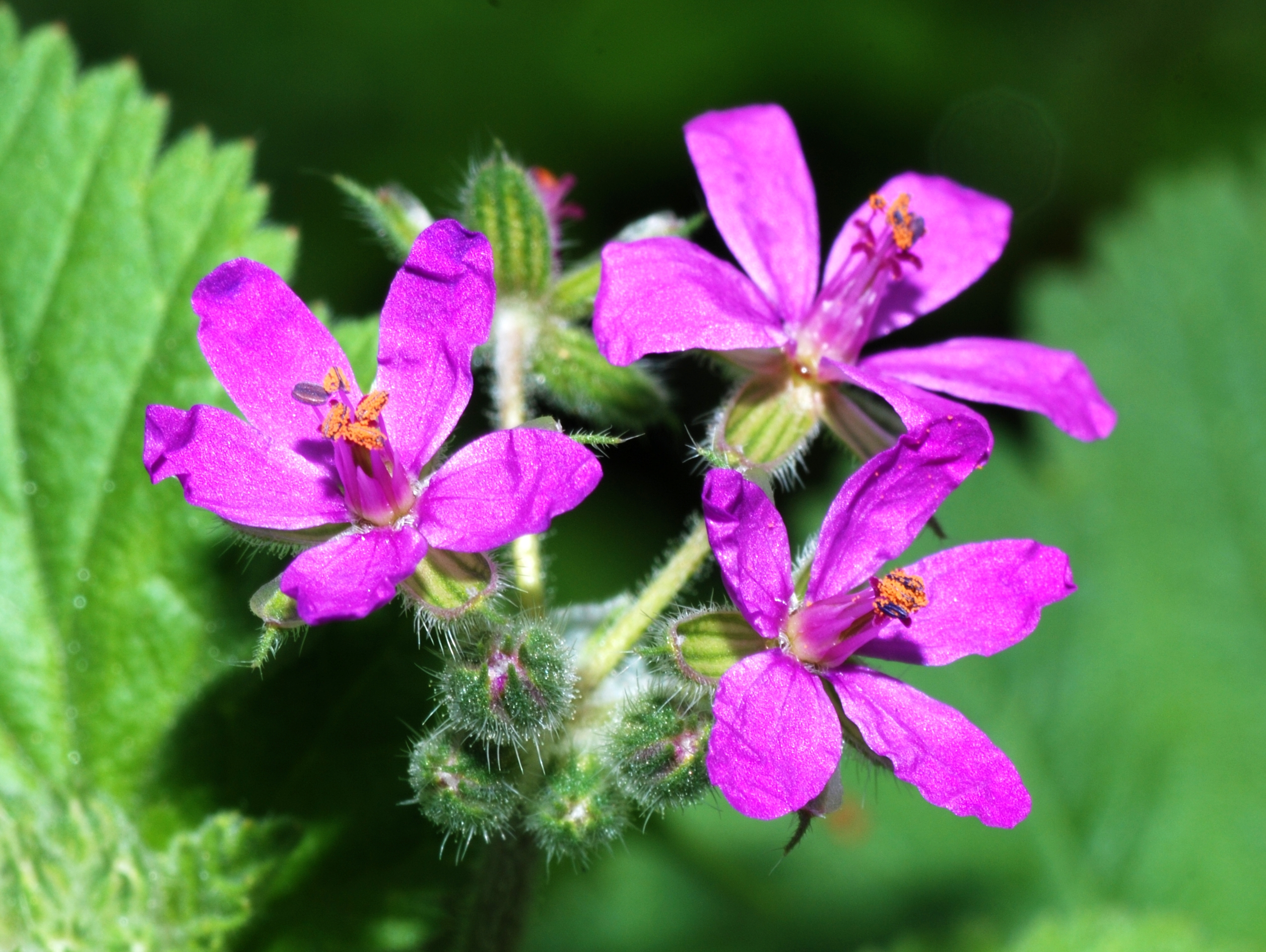
- Erodium malacoides

Scientific classification
- Kingdom: Plantae
- Clade: Tracheophytes
- Clade: Angiosperms
- Clade: Eudicots
- Clade: Rosids
- Order: Geraniales
- Family: Geraniaceae
- Genus: Erodium; Aiton

Species
- See text

Synonyms
- Erodion St.-Lag.; Myrrhina Rupr.; Ramphocarpus Neck.

= Erodium =

Genus of flowering plants

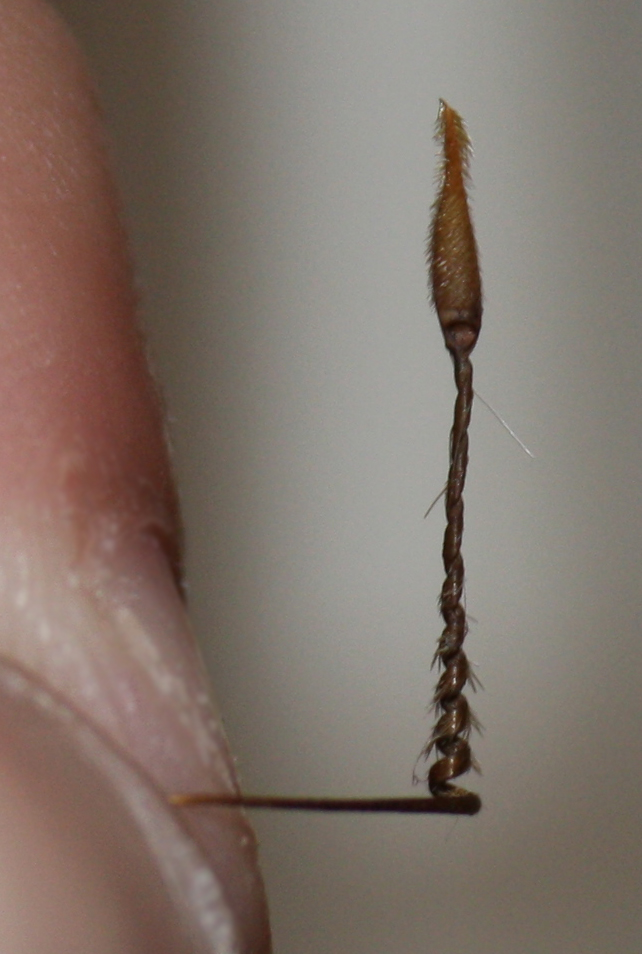
Fruit of Erodium ciconium

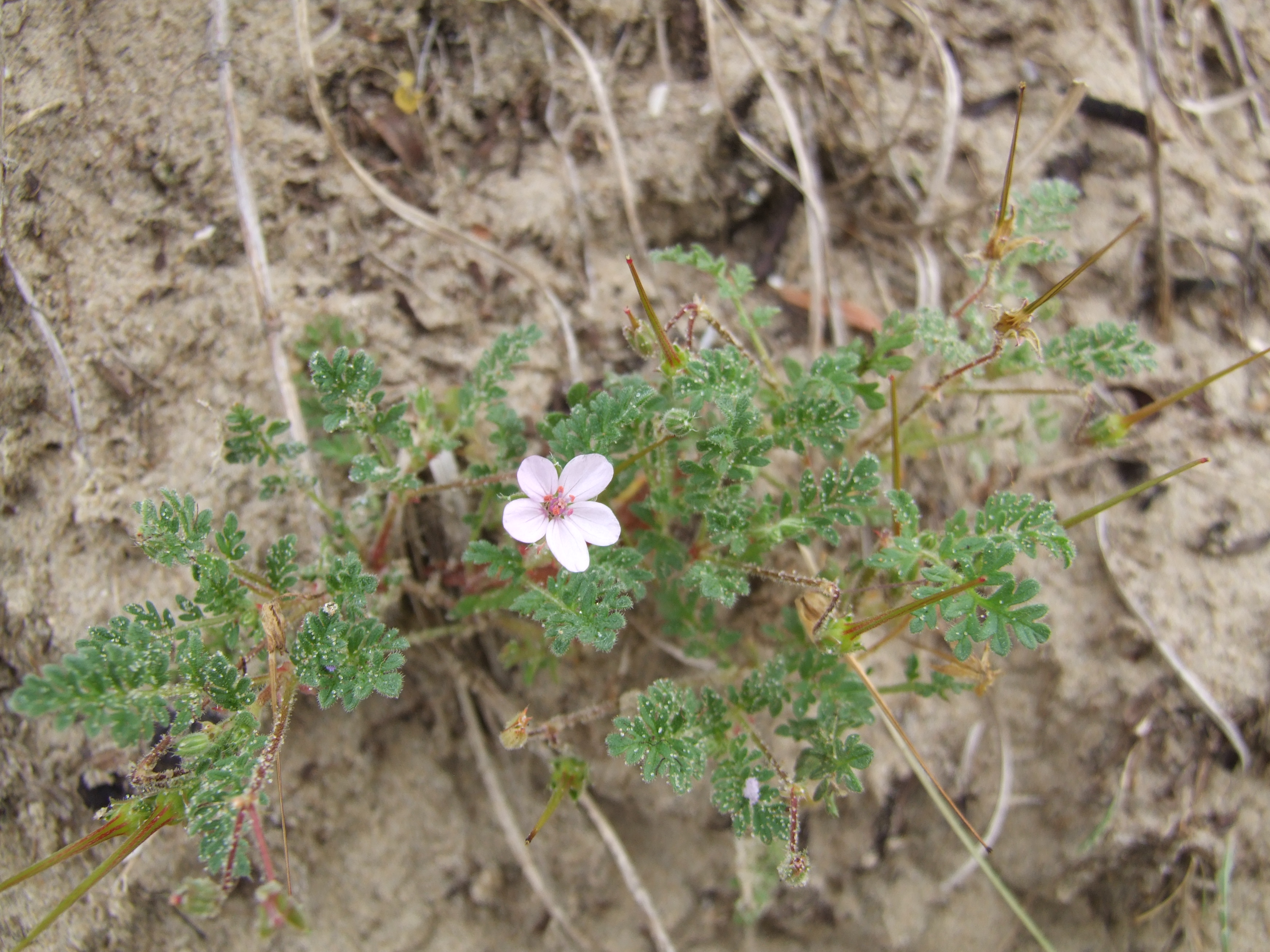
Erodium lebelii

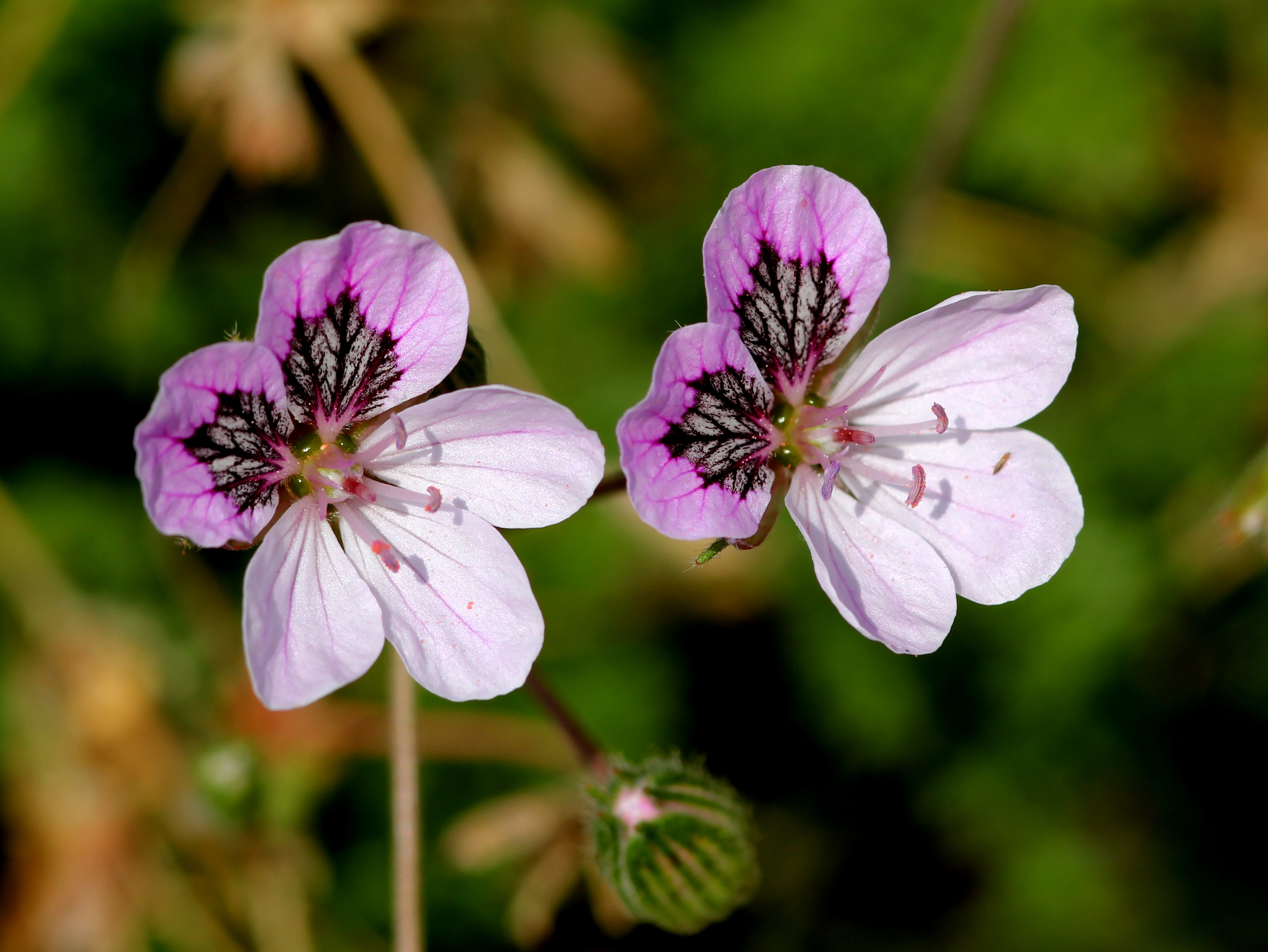
Erodium glandulosum - MHNT

Erodium is a genus of flowering plants in the botanical family Geraniaceae. The genus includes about 120 species with a subcosmopolitan distribution, native to Europe, North Africa, Asia, Australia, and more locally in North and South America. They are perennials, annuals, or subshrubs, with five-petalled flowers in shades of white, pink, and purple, that strongly resemble the better-known Geranium (crane's-bills). In English-speaking areas of Europe, the species are known as stork's-bills. In North America they are known as filarees or heron's bill.

== Taxonomy ==
Carl Linnaeus grouped in the same genus (Geranium), the three similar genera Erodium, Geranium, and Pelargonium. The distinction between them was made by Charles Louis L'Héritier de Brutelle based on the number of stamens or anthers; five in Erodium, seven for Pelargonium, and ten for Geranium. However, the three genera have the same characteristics in regard to their fruit, which resemble long bird beaks. That characteristic is the basis for the names: Geranium evokes the crane (Greek geranos), Pelargonium the stork (pelargos), and Erodium the heron (erodios). Erodium species also differ in having pinnate leaves, whereas Geranium species have palmately lobed or divided leaves.

=== Species ===
As of June 2024, the World Checklist of Selected Plant Families accepts 121 species:

- Erodium absinthoides Willd.
- Erodium acaule (L.) Bech. & Thell.
- Erodium adenophorum Blatt.
- Erodium aethiopicum (Lam.) Brumh. & Thell.
- Erodium aguilellae López Udias, Fabregat & G.Mateo
- Erodium alnifolium Guss.
- Erodium alpinum (Burm.f.) L'Hér.
- Erodium amanum Boiss. & Kotschy
- Erodium angustilobum Carolin
- Erodium anthemidifolium M.Bieb.
- Erodium arborescens (Desf.) Willd.
- Erodium asplenioides (Desf.) Willd.
- Erodium astragaloides Boiss. & Reut.
- Erodium atlanticum Coss.
- Erodium aureum Carolin
- Erodium aytacii Yild. & Dogru-Koca
- Erodium beketowii Schmalh.
- Erodium birandianum Ilarslan & Yurdak.
- Erodium boissieri Coss.
- Erodium botrys (Cav.) Bertol.
- Erodium brachycarpum (Godr.) Thell.
- Erodium carolinianum
- Erodium carvifolium Boiss. & Reut.
- Erodium castellanum (Pau) Guitt.
- Erodium cazorlanum Heywood
- Erodium cedrorum Schott
- Erodium celtibericum Pau
- Erodium cheilanthifolium Boiss.
- Erodium chevallieri Guitt.
- Erodium chilense I.M.Johnst.
- Erodium chium (L.) Willd.
- Erodium chrysanthum L'Hér. ex DC.
- Erodium ciconium (L.) L’Hér.
- Erodium cicutarium (L.) L’Hér.
- Erodium corsicum Léman
- Erodium crassifolium L'Hér.
- Erodium crenatum Pomel
- Erodium crinitum Carolin
- Erodium crispum Lapeyr.
- Erodium cyconioides Tzvelev
- Erodium cygnorum Nees
- Erodium cyrenaicum (Pamp.) Guitt.
- Erodium danicum K. Larsen
- Erodium daucoides Boiss.
- Erodium dimorphum Wendelbo
- Erodium flexuosum P.H.Davis & J.Roberts
- Erodium foetidum (L.) L'Hér.
- Erodium fumarioides Steven
- Erodium gaillardotii Boiss.
- Erodium garamantum (Maire) Guitt.
- Erodium gaussenianum P.Monts.
- Erodium geoides A.St.-Hil.
- Erodium glandulosum (Cav.) Willd.
- Erodium glaucophyllum (L.) L'Hér.
- Erodium gruinum (L.) L'Hér.
- Erodium guinochetianum Guitt.
- Erodium guttatum (Desf.) Willd.
- Erodium hakkiaricum P.H.Davis
- Erodium hartvigianum Strid & Kit Tan
- Erodium hendrikii Alpinar
- Erodium hesperium (Maire) H.Lindb.
- Erodium heteradenum (Pau & Font Quer) Guitt.
- Erodium heterosepalum Blatt.
- Erodium hoefftianum C. A. Meyer
- Erodium iranicum El-Oqlah
- Erodium jahandiezianum Emb., Maire & Weiller
- Erodium janszii Alarcón & al.
- Erodium keithii Guitt. & Le Houér.
- Erodium laciniatum (Cav.) Willd.
- Erodium lebelii Jord.
- Erodium leucanthum Boiss.
- Erodium macrophyllum Hook. & Arn.
- Erodium maculatum Salzm. ex C.Presl
- Erodium malacoides (L.) L’Hér.
- Erodium manescavi Coss.
- Erodium maritimum (L.) L’Hér.
- Erodium masguindalii Pau
- Erodium medeense Batt.
- Erodium meynieri Maire
- Erodium micropetalum Boiss. & Hausskn.
- Erodium microphyllum Pomel
- Erodium moschatum (L.) L’Hér.
- Erodium mouretii Pitard.
- Erodium munbyanum Boiss. ex Munby
- Erodium nanum Blatt.
- Erodium nervulosum L'Her.
- Erodium neuradifolium Delile ex Godr.
- Erodium oreophilum Quézel
- Erodium oxyrhinchum M.Bieb.
- Erodium paui Sennen
- Erodium pelargoniflorum Boiss. & Heldr.
- Erodium praecox (Cav.) Willd.
- Erodium pulverulentum (Cav.) Willd.
- Erodium recoderi Auriault & Guitt.
- Erodium reichardii (Murray) DC.
- Erodium rodiei (Braun-Blanq.) Poirion
- Erodium rupestre Pourr. ex cav.
- Erodium rupicola Boiss.
- Erodium ruthenicum M.Bieb.
- Erodium salzmannii Delile
- Erodium sanguis-christi Sennen
- Erodium saxatile Pau
- Erodium schemachense Grossh.
- Erodium sebaceum Delile
- Erodium sibthorpianum Boiss.
- Erodium somanum Pesmen
- Erodium sosnowskianum Fed.
- Erodium stellatum Delile
- Erodium stephanianum Willd.
- Erodium stevenii M.Bieb.
- Erodium subintegrifolium Eig
- Erodium sublyratum Samp.
- Erodium tataricum Willd.
- Erodium telavivense Eig
- Erodium texanum A. Gray
- Erodium tibetanum Edgew. & Hook.f.
- Erodium tordylioides (Desf.) L'Hér.
- Erodium touchyanum Delile ex Godr.
- Erodium toussidanum Guitt.
- Erodium trichomanefolium L'Hér.
- Erodium trifolium (Cav.) Cav.
- Erodium vetteri Barbey & Fors.-Major

Hybrids include:

- Erodium × anaristatum Andreas
- Erodium × bolosii Romo
- Erodium × fallax Jord.
- Erodium × viscosum Salzm. ex Delile

== Ecology ==
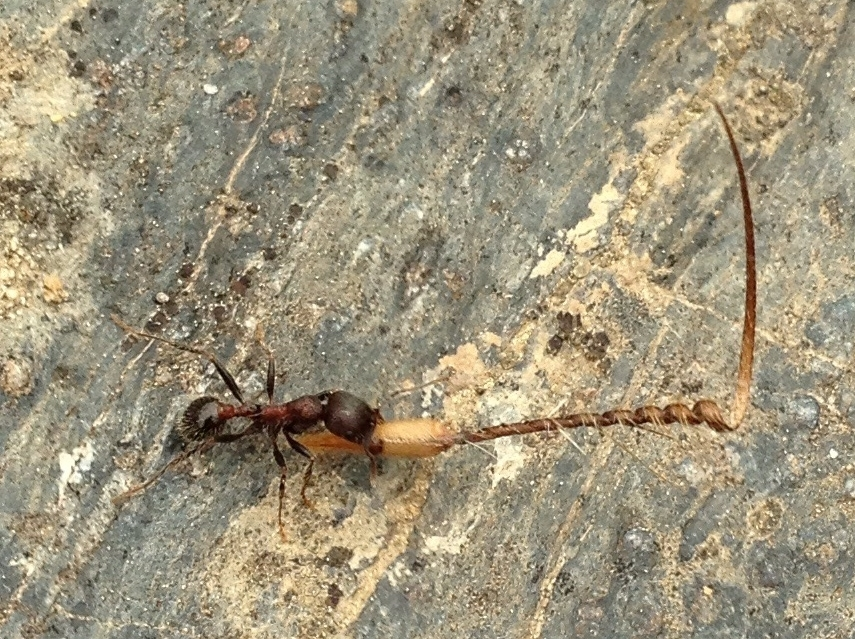
Erodium sp. seed carried by an Andre's harvester ant

Erodium species are used as food plants by the larvae of some Lepidoptera species including the pasture day moth.

== Cultivation ==
In cultivation, Erodium species are usually seen in rockeries or alpine gardens.

The hybrid cultivar E. × variabile 'Roseum' (E. corsicum × E. reichardii), a compact, spreading perennial with rose-pink flowers in summer, has gained the Royal Horticultural Society's Award of Garden Merit.

== Uses ==
Species such as E. cicutarium and E. moschatum are edible.

== See also ==
- Wool alien
