= Erodiophyllum elderi =

- At Koonamore Station, South Australia

Scientific classification
- Kingdom: Plantae
- Clade: Tracheophytes
- Clade: Angiosperms
- Clade: Eudicots
- Clade: Asterids
- Order: Asterales
- Family: Asteraceae
- Genus: Erodiophyllum
- Species: E. elderi

Binomial name
- Erodiophyllum elderi Muell.

Species of plant

Erodiophyllum elderi, commonly known as Koonamore daisy, is a flowering plant in the family Asteraceae and is endemic to Australia. It is a small perennial herb with upright stems and purple daisy-like flowers.

== Description ==
Erodiophyllum elderi is a small, perennial, woody herb with upright, roughly hairy stems to 15–50 cm (5.9–19.7 in) high and 60 cm (24 in) wide. Leaves are bright green, hairy, spear-shaped, 4–10 cm (1.6–3.9 in) long, 2–3 cm (0.79–1.18 in) wide, broadly toothed and tapering to the petiole. The flower heads 5–7 cm (2.0–2.8 in) in diameter, purple or white, disc florets yellow, peduncles hairy, thick, 5–14 cm (2.0–5.5 in) long, bracts lance-shaped, about 1.5 cm (0.59 in) long, hairy, becoming woody and hard as they age. Flowering occurs from winter to early summer and the fruit is a woody achene about 3 mm (0.12 in) long.

== Taxonomy and naming ==
This species was first formally described in 1875 by Ferdinand von Mueller and the description was published in Fragmenta Phytographiae Australiae. The specific epithet (elderi) is in honor of Thomas Elder.

== Distribution and habitat ==
Koonamore daisy grows on sandy flats and clay loam soils in chenopod and mulga shrublands in New South Wales, Western Australia and South Australia.
