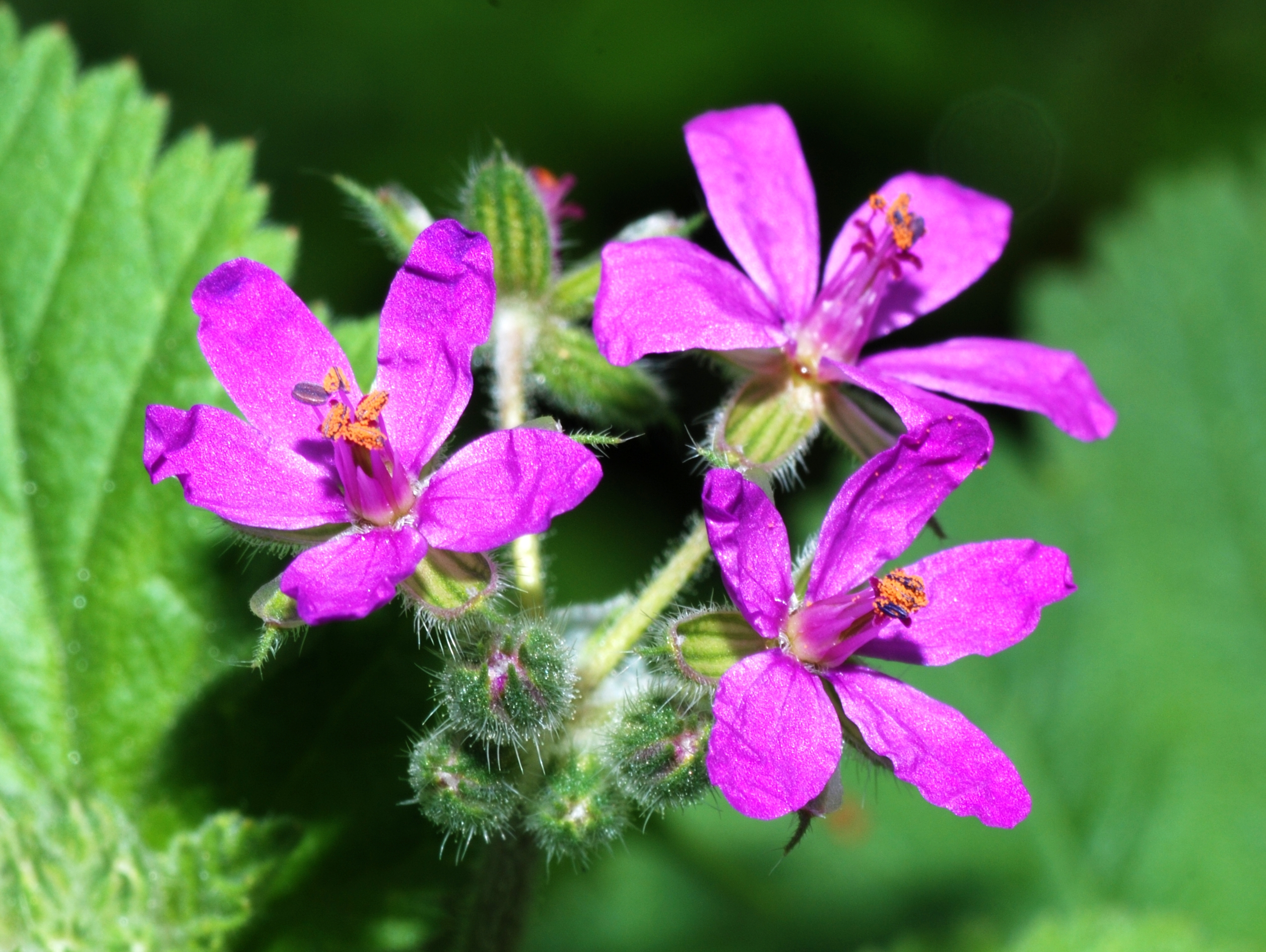

Scientific classification
- Kingdom: Plantae
- Clade: Tracheophytes
- Clade: Angiosperms
- Clade: Eudicots
- Clade: Rosids
- Order: Geraniales
- Family: Geraniaceae
- Genus: Erodium
- Species: E. malacoides

Binomial name
- Erodium malacoides (L.) L'Hér.

= Erodium malacoides =

Species of flowering plant

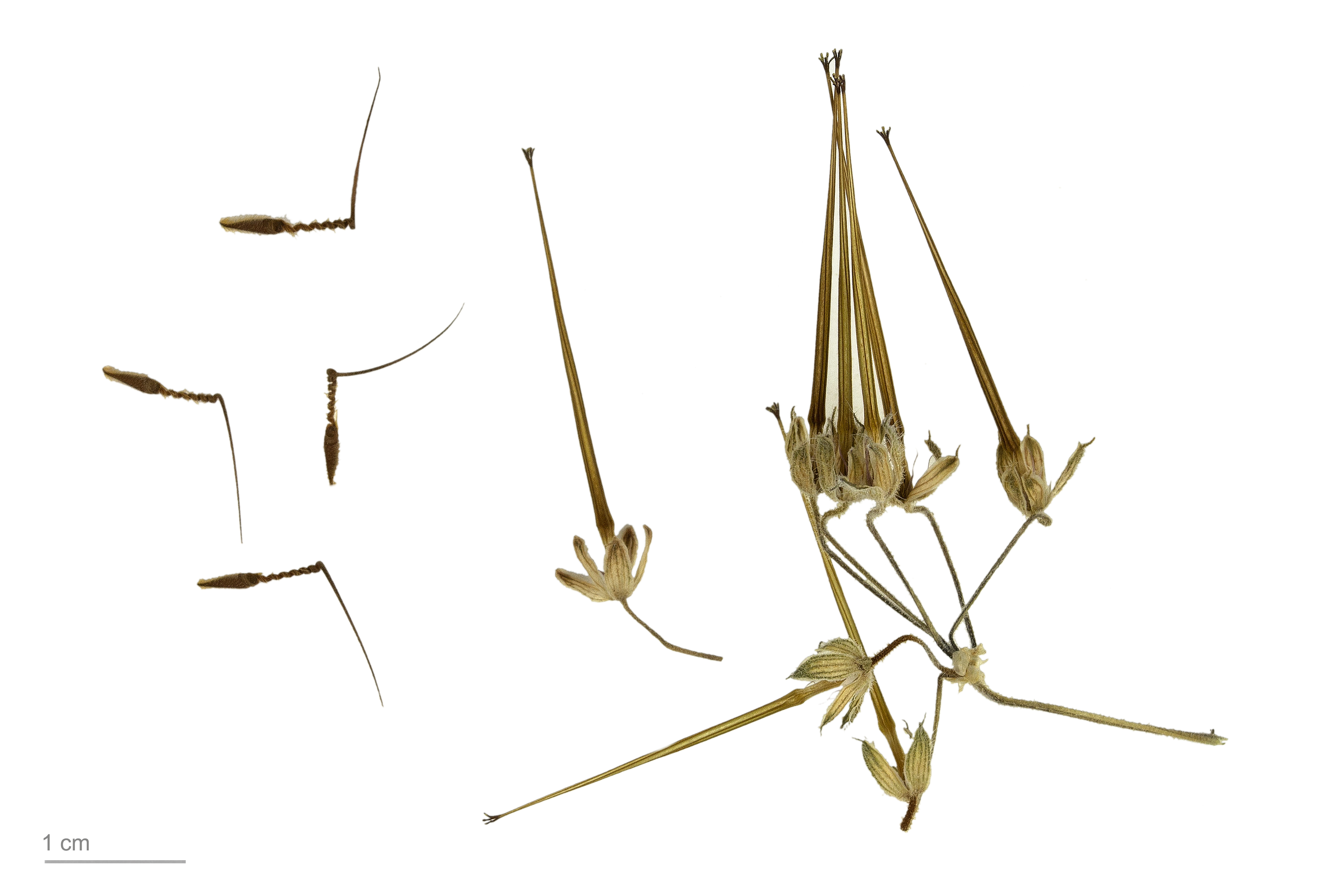
Erodium malacoïdes MHNT

Erodium malacoides is a species of flowering plant in the geranium family known by the common names mallow-leaved stork's bill, Mediterranean stork's bill, and soft stork's-bill. It is an annual or biennial herb which is native to the Mediterranean region in southern Europe (north to 49°N in western France), northern Africa, and southwest Asia. It can be found locally elsewhere is an introduced species.

== Description ==
The young plant grows a number of rugose green leaves, radially outward flat against the ground. The stems reach 10–60 cm in height, with more leaves on long, hairy petioles, with glandular hairs. It bears small flowers in umbels of 3–7 together; they are 10–16 mm diameter, with fuzzy, soft spine-tipped sepals and five purplish petals 5-9 mm long with rounded (not notched) apices. The fruit is green with a glandular body about 5 mm long, with a long, pointed style 18–35 mm long. It grows in dry, sunny habitats. In the south of its range in Malta, it flowers from January to June, while further north in western France, from June to August.
