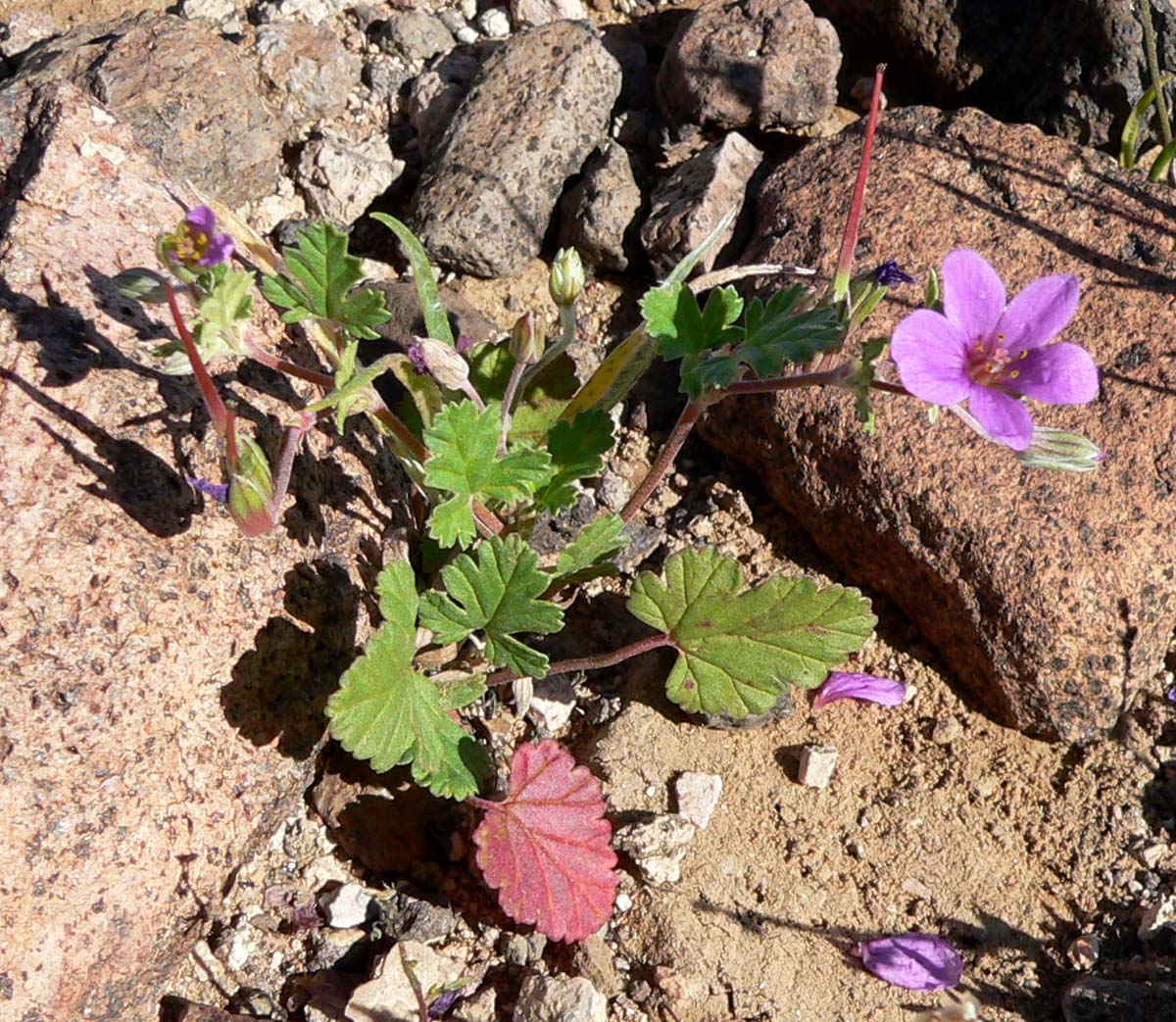

Scientific classification
- Kingdom: Plantae
- Clade: Tracheophytes
- Clade: Angiosperms
- Clade: Eudicots
- Clade: Rosids
- Order: Geraniales
- Family: Geraniaceae
- Genus: Erodium
- Species: E. texanum

Binomial name
- Erodium texanum A. Gray

= Erodium texanum =

Species of flowering plant

Erodium texanum, also known as Texas filaree, Texas stork's bill, or heronbill, is a flowering plant which is native to the southwestern United States and northern Mexico. It is an annual or biennial herb.
