= Erodium astragaloides =

Conservation status
- Critically Endangered (IUCN 3.1)

Scientific classification
- Kingdom: Plantae
- Clade: Embryophytes
- Clade: Tracheophytes
- Clade: Angiosperms
- Clade: Eudicots
- Clade: Rosids
- Order: Geraniales
- Family: Geraniaceae
- Genus: Erodium
- Species: E. astragaloides

Binomial name
- Erodium astragaloides Boiss. & Reut., 1852

Synonyms
- Erodium camposianum Coss. ex Willk. & Lange

Species of flowering plant

Erodium astragaloides is a species of flowering plant in the geranium family Geraniaceae. It is endemic to Sierra Nevada, southern Spain.

== Habitat ==
The distinctive species can grow in sparse grasslands on less developed rocky-sandy dolomitic soils. It is associated with Juniperus phoenicea, as a part of communities which are rich at endemic species, such as Rothmaleria granatensis, Helianthemum pannosum, Silene boryi, Convolvulus boissieri, Anthyllis tejedensis, Thymus granatensis, and Saxifraga erioblasta.
