= Erodium crinitum =

Scientific classification
- Kingdom: Plantae
- Clade: Tracheophytes
- Clade: Angiosperms
- Clade: Eudicots
- Clade: Rosids
- Order: Geraniales
- Family: Geraniaceae
- Genus: Erodium
- Species: E. crinitum

Binomial name
- Erodium crinitum Carolin

Species of plant native to Australia

Erodium crinitum is a species of flowering plant native to mainland Australia.

== Taxonomy and history ==
Erodium crinitum was described in 1958 by Roger Charles Carolin in volume 83 of the Proceedings of the Linnean Society of New South Wales. The holotype specimen was collected by Carolin at Fowler's Gap, New South Wales in June of 1956.

In English it is known by the common names blue crowfoot, native crowfoot, blue heron's-bill, wild geranium, native geranium, storksbill, and blue storksbill.

In the Yuwaalayaay language of north-central New South Wales this species is known as dhawaarrii.

== Distribution and habitat ==
Erodium crinitum is native to Australia, where it is known from all mainland states (New South Wales, Queensland, South Australia, Victoria, and Western Australia) and the Northern Territory. It grows in woodland, grassland, shrubland, and mallee habitats. It is capable of growing in all soil types but is most prevalent in sandy soils.

Outside its native range, E. crinitum has been introduced to Europe and Japan.

== Description ==
Erodium crinitum is a spreading to erect herbaceous plant growing to approximately 40 cm (16 in) tall. The plant arises from a stout taproot, and the stems are covered with stiff, white hairs. The hairy leaves, measuring approximately 1.5–5 cm (0.59–1.97 in) long, are typically trilobed to trifoliate but broadly ovate in overall outline with toothed leaflets. The thin, hairy petioles measure 2–13 cm (0.79–5.12 in). The inflorescence is a two to six flowered umbel, rarely a solitary flower, with 8–30 mm (0.31–1.18 in) long pedicels borne on a 1.5–6 cm (0.59–2.36 in) long peduncle. The five sepals are hairy and lanceolate to narrowly oblong. The flowers have five blue-purple petals. The long, tapering fruit measures 4–7 cm (1.6–2.8 in) long and splits into five mericarps with long awns when ripe.

Flowering occurs from August to March. This species is morphologically variable throughout its range, with intergradation between the variants.

== Ecology ==
The chytrid fungus Synchytrium papillatum is known to infect E. crinitum.
