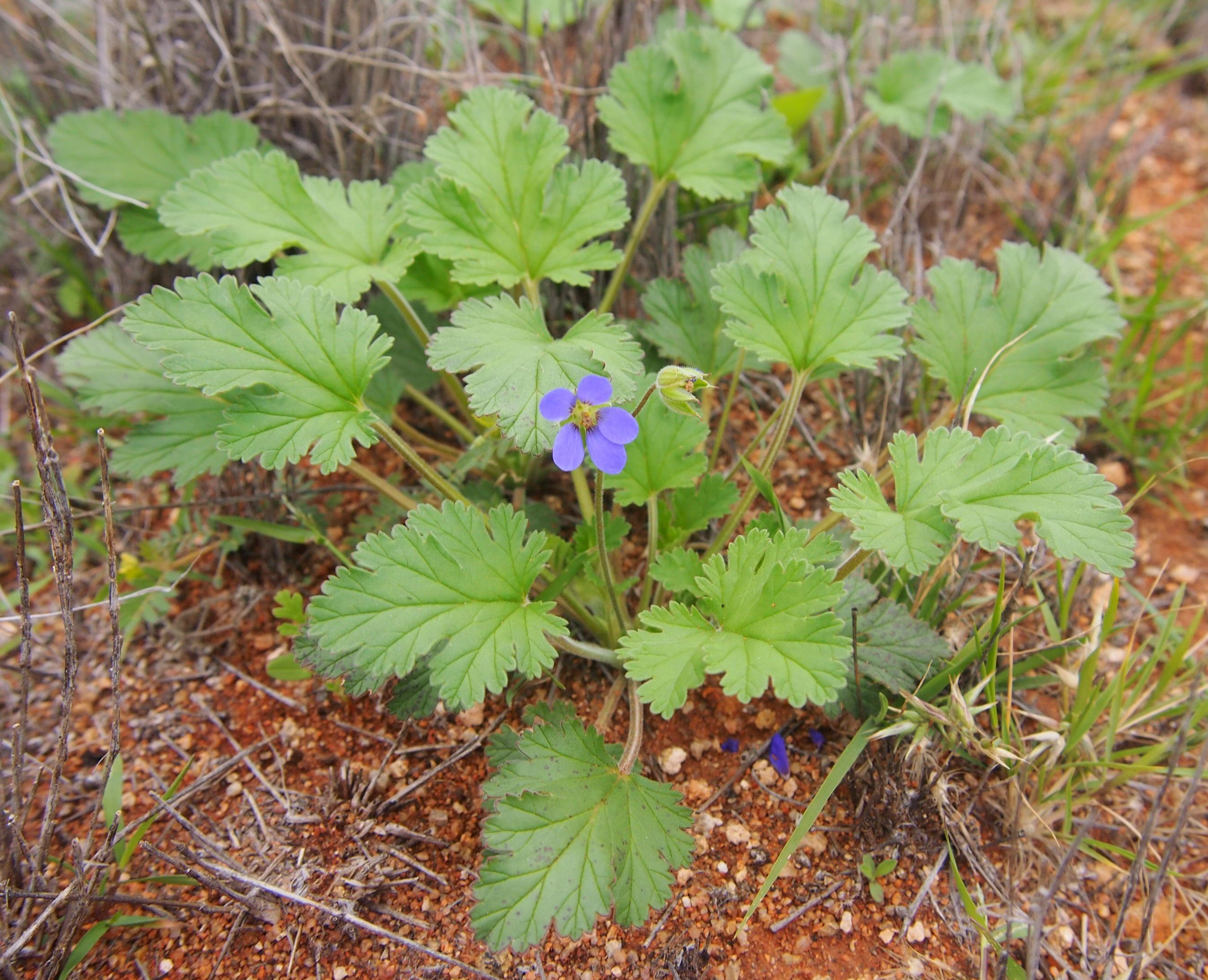

Scientific classification
- Kingdom: Plantae
- Clade: Tracheophytes
- Clade: Angiosperms
- Clade: Eudicots
- Clade: Rosids
- Order: Geraniales
- Family: Geraniaceae
- Genus: Erodium
- Species: E. cygnorum

Binomial name
- Erodium cygnorum Nees

= Erodium cygnorum =

Species of plant

Erodium cygnorum is a species of herb native to Australia.

It is commonly known as blue heronsbill in Western Australia, and blue storksbill in South Australia. In the United States, where the species is cultivated as a garden plant, it is commonly known as Australian stork's bill and Australian filaree. In the British Isles, it is commonly known as western stork's-bill.

== Description ==
It grows as an annual or perennial herb up to 60 centimetres high, with blue, purple or pink flowers.

== Taxonomy ==
This species was published in 1845, based on a specimen collected from the vicinity of Perth, Western Australia by Ludwig Preiss in 1839. In 1958, Roger Charles Carolin published a subspecies, Erodium cygnorum subsp. glandulosum, but this has since been promoted to species rank as E. carolinianum. No infraspecific taxa of E. cygnorum are currently recognised.

== Distribution and habitat ==
It is native to Australia, occurring in Western Australia, South Australia and the Northern Territory. The National Herbarium of New South Wales lists E. cygnorum as also occurring in New South Wales, but they further identify their specimens as E. cygnorum subsp. glandulosum; that is, E. carolinianum.

It favours red sand or clay loam, occurring in low-lying flats, along creeklines and on the margins of salt lakes.
