= Erodium alnifolium =

Scientific classification
- Kingdom: Plantae
- Clade: Tracheophytes
- Clade: Angiosperms
- Clade: Eudicots
- Clade: Rosids
- Order: Geraniales
- Family: Geraniaceae
- Genus: Erodium
- Species: E. alnifolium

Binomial name
- Erodium alnifolium Guss.

Synonyms
- Erodium chium var. crassifolium

Species of plant

Erodium alnifolium is a species of annual herb in the family Geraniaceae. It have a self-supporting growth form.

== Sources ==
This article incorporates text from a free content work. Licensed under CC0 (license statement/permission). Text taken from Erodium alnifolium. Encyclopedia of Life.
