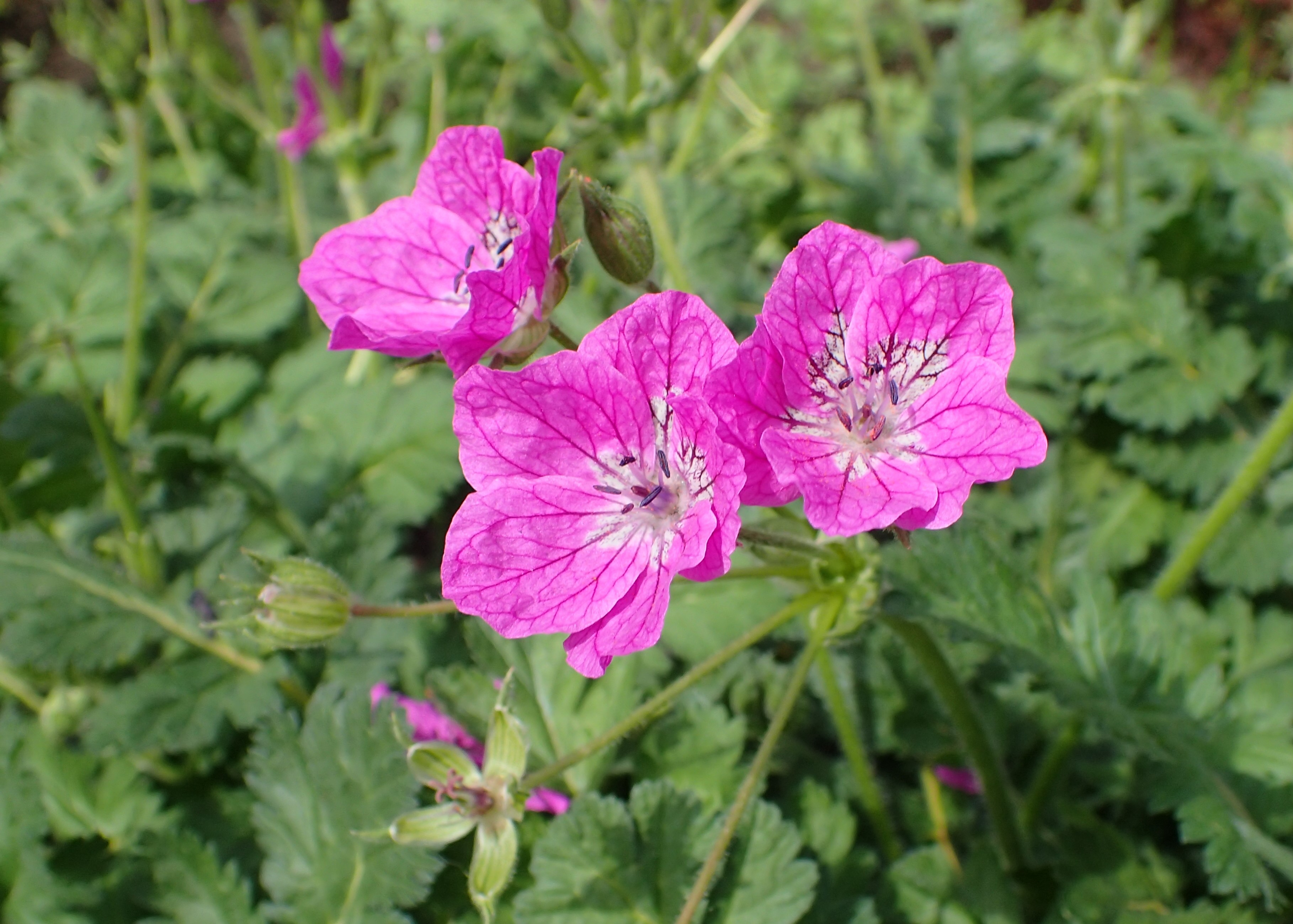
- Flowers

Scientific classification
- Kingdom: Plantae
- Clade: Tracheophytes
- Clade: Angiosperms
- Clade: Eudicots
- Clade: Rosids
- Order: Geraniales
- Family: Geraniaceae
- Genus: Erodium
- Species: E. manescavi

Binomial name
- Erodium manescavi Coss.

Synonyms
- Erodium longipes Bubani

= Erodium manescavi =

Species of plant

Erodium manescavi (or Erodium manescavii), called the garden stork's-bill, large purple storksbill, Manescau storksbill, Manescau heronsbill and showy heron's bill, is a species of flowering plant in the family Geraniaceae. Endemic to the western Pyrenees mountains, this plant occurs in France and Spain.

== Description ==
Erodium manescavi is a perennial herbaceous plant that grows to a height of 28–50 cm. The plant is stemless (acaulescent), with a woody, slightly branched rootstock. All leaves grow in a basal rosette and are oval-lanceolate in shape, measuring 6.3–12.5 by 3–5.5 cm. Each leaf is divided deeply into segments (pinnatisect) without smaller segments between the main divisions. The leaves are covered with non-glandular hairs on both the blade and central rib.

The flower stalks (inflorescence) arise directly from the rootstock and bear clusters of 5–12 flowers. Each flower has five sepals measuring 8.2–9.5 by 2.9–4.3 mm, which extend to 10–13.5 mm when the fruit develops. The petals are 10–19.5 by 6–11.2 mm, unequal in size, and deep magenta in colour. The upper two petals feature a whitish blotchy pattern with dark veins covering one-third to one-half of the petal's surface. The flowers contain five fertile stamens with filaments 3.1–4.5 mm long that widen abruptly at the base, and five sterile stamens (staminodes).

After flowering, the plant produces a distinctive fruit measuring 53.8–75 mm in total length. Each individual seed carrier (mericarp) is 8–10.3 mm long, brown-coloured, and bears bristles arising from crescent-shaped markings. The tip of each mericarp has a well-defined pit (fovéola) without glands or furrows below it, and a long twisted bristle (arista) with stiff fibres that aids in seed dispersal. Each seed measures 3.8–5 by 1.3–2.4 mm.

== Distribution ==
Erodium manescavi grows on sheltered ledges, heathlands, and grassy meadows in calcareous soil that is somewhat nitrogen-enriched. It typically occurs at elevations between 700 and 1,500 metres above sea level. The plant shows a preference for rocky outcrops and terrain with shallow margosa limestone soils.

The species has a limited geographic distribution, being endemic to the western Pyrenees mountains along the border between France and Spain. In France, it is found in the Pyrenees Atlantiques department, specifically in the valleys of Soule, Ossau, and Aspe. On the Spanish side, the plant occurs only in northern Navarre, where it is restricted to the Bertizarana valley. After a long period without documented sightings in Spain, the plant was rediscovered relatively recently, as reported by Aizpuru and colleagues in 2003. The species is quite abundant in its Spanish localities, though its overall distribution remains highly restricted geographically.

== Award ==
As Erodium manescavii it has gained the Royal Horticultural Society's Award of Garden Merit.

== Taxonomy ==
Erodium manescavi was first described by the French botanist Ernest Cosson in 1847. The specific epithet honours Mr. Manescau, who was mayor of Pau at the time of the plant's description. Pietro Bubani later proposed the synonym Erodium longipes in his 1901 work Flora Pyrenaea.

The species falls within the genus Erodium, part of the family Geraniaceae. The genus name derives from the Greek word "erōdiós" (ερωδιός), meaning 'heron', referring to the fruit's resemblance to a heron's bill, which is characteristic of nearly all members of the Geraniaceae. Erodium manescavi is distinguished from related species by having its bract bases fused for at least two-thirds of their length, forming a sort of involucre, and by its relatively large sepals with mucro (pointed tip) measuring 1.7–2.9 mm during flowering. The species has a chromosome number of 2n=40, indicating it is tetraploid.
