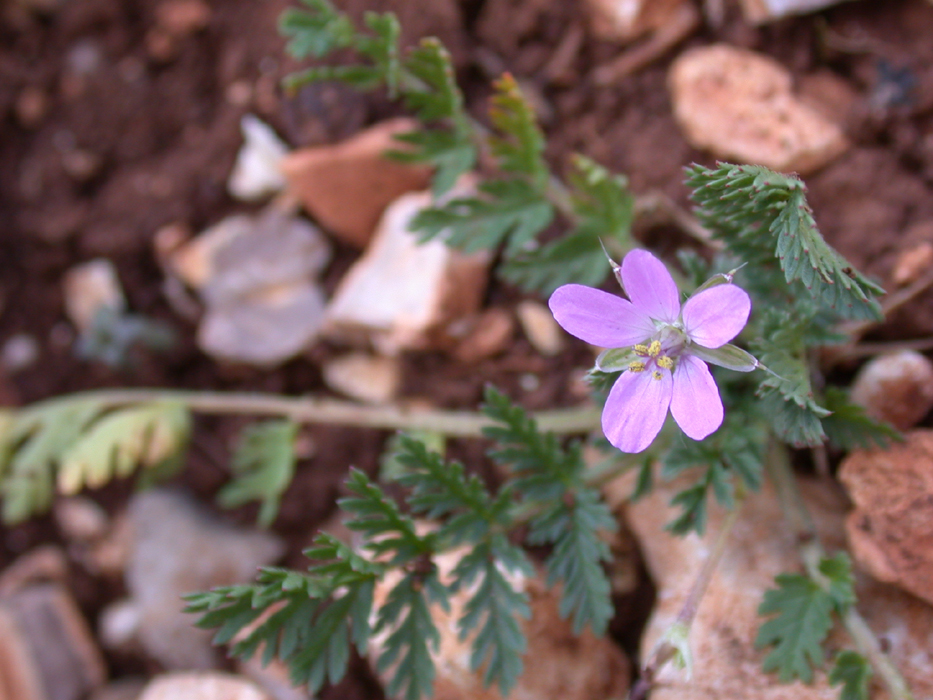

Scientific classification
- Kingdom: Plantae
- Clade: Embryophytes
- Clade: Tracheophytes
- Clade: Angiosperms
- Clade: Eudicots
- Clade: Rosids
- Order: Geraniales
- Family: Geraniaceae
- Genus: Erodium
- Species: E. acaule

Binomial name
- Erodium acaule (L.) Bech. & Thell.

= Erodium acaule =

Species of flowering plant

Erodium acaule is a species of plant in the family Geraniaceae.

== Description ==
Perennial, acaulescent, 15–25 cm (6–10 in) high. Hairs spare, appressed. Root vertical, lignified. Leaves rosulate, lanceolate-oblong, spreading on soil, pinnatisect. Segments sessile, oblong-ovate, Pinnatilobed, in short and acute strips. Flowers 1.5 cm in diameter, bright pink. Petals equal, 2-3 times longer than calyx, rounded at apex. Beak of fruits 4–5 cm long.

== Flowering ==
Nearly all the year round.

== Habitat ==
Fields. waste ground.

== Distribution ==
Coast, lower and middle mountains, Beqaa valley in Lebanon.

== Geographic area ==
Syria, Lebanon, the Palestine region, the Eastern Mediterranean, and southern Europe.

The generic name is derived from the Greek erôdios, heron, since the fruit of this plant, which ends in a long bill, suggests the bill of a heron. The specific name, indicating that the plant is stemless, is formed of the privative prefix a and of the Greek kaulos, stem
