= Wool alien =

Plant species transported via wool products

The term wool alien is used for any plant species whose occurrence at a particular site is due to transportation there as a result of the making of wool products. The most common source of wool aliens is when a plant, seed, or bur attaches to the wool of a sheep or other wool-producing animal prior to shearing. After the animal is shorn and the raw wool is transported to a refinery mill, the impurities are discarded along with the attached seed, which then successfully germinates. Wool aliens are typically found on waste ground near woollen mills. Wool cleanings have also been used as soil conditioners in orchards and fields, which may also contain wool alien species.

Stork's-bills (Erodium) are particularly prone to appearing as wool aliens in Britain.
