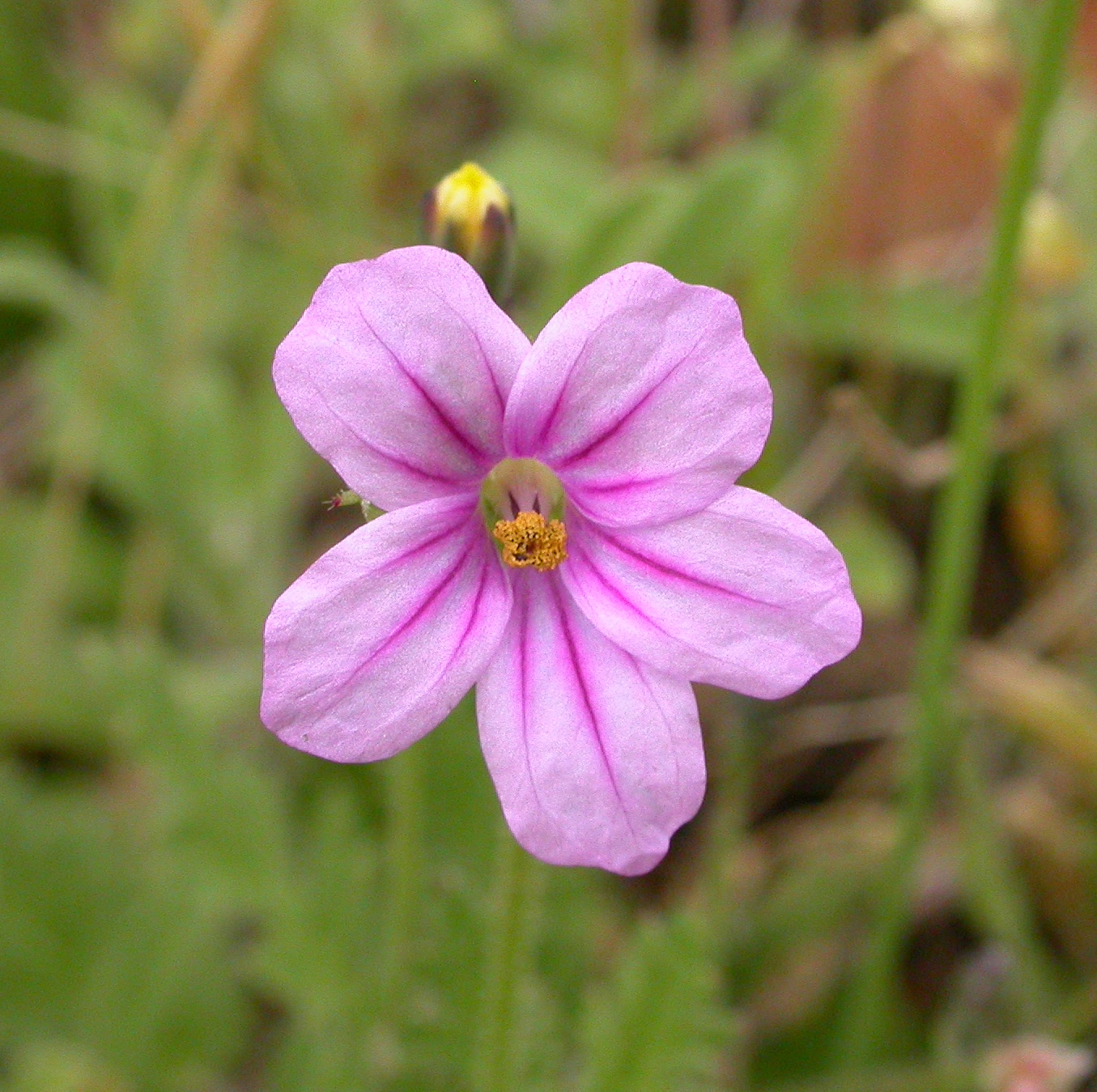

Scientific classification
- Kingdom: Plantae
- Clade: Tracheophytes
- Clade: Angiosperms
- Clade: Eudicots
- Clade: Rosids
- Order: Geraniales
- Family: Geraniaceae
- Genus: Erodium
- Species: E. botrys

Binomial name
- Erodium botrys (Cav.) Bertol.

= Erodium botrys =

Species of flowering plant

Erodium botrys is a species of flowering plant in the geranium family known by the common names longbeak stork's bill, Mediterranean stork's-bill and broadleaf filaree.

== Distribution ==
This is an annual herb which is native to much of Eurasia, the Mediterranean region, and North Africa.

It is found in many other areas of the world as a weedy introduced species, including Australia, New Zealand, South Africa, and parts of the Americas.

== Description ==
Erodium botrys starts from a flat rosette of highly lobed green leaves on red petioles. It grows to heights of anywhere from 10 to 90 centimeters (3.9 to 35.4 in) with somewhat hairy stems and foliage.

It bears small flowers with hairy, pointed sepals surrounding five purple-streaked lavender petals.

The filaree fruit is quite long, its style reaching up to 12 centimeters (4.7 in) in length.
