= Charles Louis L'Héritier de Brutelle =

French botanist and civil servant (1746-1800)

- Born: 1746
- Died: 1800 (aged 53–54)
- Scientific career
- Author abbrev. (botany): L'Hér.

Charles Louis L'Héritier de Brutelle (French pronunciation: [ʃaʁl lwi leʁitje də bʁytɛl]; 15 June 1746 – 18 August 1800) was an 18th-century French botanist and civil servant. Born into an affluent upper-class Parisian family, connections with the French Royal Court secured him the position of Superintendent of Parisian Waters and Forests at the age of twenty-six. In this capacity, L'Héritier conducted various studies of native trees and shrubs, also gaining interest in exotic flora. The standard author abbreviation L'Hér. is used to indicate this person as the author when citing a botanical name. The abbreviation L'Herit. is also used.

== Early life ==
Apart from what is stated above, little is known of his early life before his first employment. He appears to have been self-taught in botany, after taking up the superintendency.

In 1775, L'Héritier was appointed a magistrate in the Cour des Aides in Paris. This was a court which dealt with tax offences, but under its president Malesherbes it became perhaps the only French government institution to protect ordinary citizens against a corrupt state. Malesherbes himself was a keen botanist, but in the same year (1775) he was forced out of office because he published a scheme to reform the tax system.

Also in 1775, L'Héritier married Thérèse-Valère Doré. They had five children in the 19 years until Thérèse-Valère died.

With his private wealth and public income, L'Héritier was enabled to pursue his botanical interests as a wealthy amateur. He was a strict follower of the Linnaean system of plant classification. The most influential French botanists of the time—Jussieu, Adanson and others—advocated a more natural system of classification, meaning beauty. L'Héritier soon clashed with them, although he was friends with other scholars such as Georges Cuvier, Pierre Marie Auguste Broussonet, and André Thouin. Through these contacts, he corresponded with other botanists such as Joseph Banks and James Edward Smith, in the Linnaean stronghold of England.

Around 1783, he conceived the idea of publishing papers on new plant species. To Banks he wrote: "I am still keeping my project secret, in order that this type of work cannot be claimed by our professors" and it is said that he had paid informers among the professional gardeners of Paris in order to be alerted whenever a new species came into flower. Such was the rivalry among botanists at that time, to be able to publish a new species first.

The first fascicle (volume) of Stirpes Novae (New Plants) came out in March 1785, the second in January 1786, and a third in March 1786. Other fascicles made an appearance in 1788 and later. These were published at his own expense, like almost all his botanical works, and included a full-page plate illustrating each new species. From the second volume on, the plates were drawn by Pierre-Joseph Redouté, who later gave L'Héritier the credit for starting him on his career and fame.

== The Dombey Affair ==
Joseph Dombey, a young French adventurer, was given permission by the Spanish government to collect botanical specimens in its South American colonies, under strict conditions; in particular, half the collection was to be given to Spain. That half was lost to Spain when the British captured the ship carrying it, more was lost by delays in customs at Cadiz, and by the time Dombey reached Paris his collection was very much reduced. French botanists considered that its new species should be published (without waiting for Spanish botanists to do so), which was against the conditions imposed by Spain. L'Héritier offered to describe and publish at his own expense, and the collection was handed over to him in 1786.

The Spanish government objected, and requested the remaining collection be remitted to them, which the French government agreed to do. However, L'Héritier was at court at Versailles when the decision was given. He immediately hurried home, packed the collection and left post-haste for England, while giving it out that he had gone to his country-house on holiday. He stayed in and around London for 15 months, until things had quietened down. On his return to Paris he published (in 1789) Sertum Anglicum (An English Garland) which included some of the Dombey plants (but they were outnumbered by new species he found being cultivated in England). The Dombey collection remained in his herbarium until his death.

== French Revolution ==
As a magistrate of a respected court, and holding liberal political ideas himself, L'Héritier was at first not at risk when the French Revolution began in 1789. He was one of few former magistrates to be appointed judge of a revolutionary tribunal. In October 1789, he was even appointed commander of his district's National Guard. Acting under his orders, his troops prevented the massacre of the King's bodyguard when the Parisian mob removed the King from Versailles to Paris.

In 1790, he was elected to the Academy of Sciences as an associate member in spite of de Jussieu, Adanson, and Lamarck voting against him. During this phase of the revolution he continued to publish botanical papers.

In late 1792, however, the Reign of Terror began and it is said that L'Héritier was imprisoned for a time, and in danger of execution, but some of his botanist friends got him released; there is no independent confirmation of this. Certainly his former patron, Malesherbes, went to the guillotine.

About the time the Reign of Terror of ended in 1794, L'Héritier's wife Thérèse-Valère died. The eldest son, Jacques, left home and seems to have become estranged; the eldest daughter went to live with another family, while L'Héritier and his servants cared for the youngest three (Rose, the youngest, was only two at this time but lived to the age of 99). L'Héritier did not remarry.

== Post-Revolution ==
L'Héritier was ruined by the Revolution, and had to take a low paid job at the Justice ministry, although he was also a member of the Commission on Agriculture and the Arts and was involved in the publication of several agricultural reports.

In 1795, the Academy of Sciences was reborn as the National Institute of Sciences and Arts, and L'Héritier was elected to full membership, which came with a decent salary. He still had his library and herbarium, which he allowed free use to young botanists such as de Candolle.

On the evening of 16 August 1800, as he was walking home after working late at the Institute, he was attacked and murdered in the street by an unknown assailant. One rumour was that the assassin was his eldest son. His body now lies in the Père Lachaise Cemetery.

He left a herbarium of approximately 8,000 species and a large botanic library, reputedly second only to that of Sir Joseph Banks. The herbarium was added to the French national collections, while the library was dispersed.

== Character ==
Georges Cuvier said of him: "His works were superb, but his table frugal and his clothes simple. He spent 20,000 francs a year on botany, but went about on foot."

de Candolle said: "He was a dry man, cold in appearance but actually quite passionate, acrimonious and sarcastic in conversation, given to small intrigues, a declared enemy of de Jussieu, de Lamarck and even of the new methods, but always doing for me acts of kindness for which I was grateful."

He always refused to have any portrait made.

== Works ==
- Stirpes Novae aut minus cognitae, quas descriptionibus et iconibus illustravit... Paris, ex typographia Philippi-Dionysii Pierres (1784) - (1791) - on line, Gallica
- L'Héritier de Brutelle, Charles Louis (1788). Sertum Anglicum, seu, Plantae rariores quae in hortis juxta Londinum: imprimis in horto regio Kewensi excoluntur, ab anno 1786 ad annum 1787 observatae. Paris: Petri Francisci Didot. (Published in parts, 1789-1793, although title page says 1788: see Stafleu's essay, cited in Further Reading).
- Geraniologia, seu Erodii, Pelargonii, Geranii, Monsoniae et Grieli, Historia iconibus illustrata, Parisii, Typo Petri-Francisci Didot (1787-1788; 1792); plates by Pierre-Joseph Redouté on line.
- Cornus: specimen botanicum sistens descriptiones et icones specierum corni minus cognitarum, Parisiis, Typis Petri-Francisci Didot, (1788). MGB Library, on Line.
- "Mémoire sur un nouveau genre de plants appelé Cadia", Magasin encyclopédique, (1795)
