= Geology of Shropshire =

Geology of English county

The geology of the county of Shropshire, England (Note: This article describes the geology of the ceremonial county of Shropshire, which includes the modern administrative county together with the district of Telford and Wrekin) is very diverse with a large number of periods being represented at outcrop. The bedrock consists principally of sedimentary rocks of Palaeozoic and Mesozoic age, surrounding restricted areas of Precambrian metasedimentary and metavolcanic rocks. The county hosts in its Quaternary deposits and landforms, a significant record of recent glaciation. The exploitation of the Coal Measures and other Carboniferous age strata in the Ironbridge area made it one of the birthplaces of the Industrial Revolution. There is also a large amount of mineral wealth in the county, including lead and baryte. Quarrying is still active, with limestone for cement manufacture and concrete aggregate, sandstone, greywacke and dolerite for road aggregate, and sand and gravel for aggregate and drainage filters. Groundwater is an equally important economic resource.

The Church Stretton Fault is a major structural feature forming a part of the Welsh Borderland Fault System which runs northeast from Wales, entering the county near Clun, and extending beyond the town of Newport to the southeast margin of the Cheshire Basin. The fault itself passes almost through Church Stretton, immediately east of the Long Mynd, and also passes close to The Wrekin. Another, extensive fault exists in Shropshire, the Pontesford-Linley Fault, situated near the village of Pontesbury, south west of the county town of Shrewsbury.

The oldest rocks in Shropshire are of Precambrian age and are to be found at Rushton, a mile west of The Wrekin, as schists and gneisses. East of Shrewsbury, on Haughmond Hill, the sedimentary rocks are of somewhat younger Precambrian age, and are being actively quarried for use on roads.

The Wrekin is a prominent hill near the town of Telford. The sedimentary rock types are varied around the area, but lava and volcanic ash (tuff) from various volcanic eruptions form this famous landmark. However, The Wrekin itself is not a volcano, and never was. The primary igneous rock on the Wrekin is rhyolite; this has a pinkish colour and is usually banded as it is a slow cooling viscous extrusive rock. Intrusions of igneous rock have been quarried in the past at nearby Ercall Quarry. Here, the main type of igneous rock that can be found is granophyre. At Ercall Quarry is the contact (boundary) between Precambrian rocks and the younger fossiliferous (Cambrian) sedimentary rocks.

Much of North Shropshire is a plain which is a basin of Permian and Triassic New Red Sandstone. This basin continues north into Cheshire. Faulting has occurred within the sandstones, because of basin extension during and after the infilling of the basin. Escarpments form small prominent hills within the plain. The basin is bounded on the east by the Hodnet Fault, which runs roughly from Shrewsbury to Market Drayton. East of this fault the sandstone is thinner. In the north west of the county near Oswestry are outcrops of Carboniferous Limestone and the Coal Measures.

The Shropshire Hills AONB were formed on a continental shelf, but buckled up into hills at the time of a continental collision: the Variscan Orogeny. The most famous of these hills is probably the Long Mynd, which is Precambrian in age and forms the west side of the Stretton Valley. East of Church Stretton is Wenlock Edge, a Silurian limestone escarpment. In between lies a complete succession through the late Precambrian, Cambrian, Ordovician and into the Silurian. South West of Church Stretton bordering Wales, is the very rural area of Clun Forest formed largely from Silurian age rocks.

Igneous intrusions outcropping at the surface in South Shropshire are few and small, but much larger bodies are believed to exist at shallow depths, evidenced by geophysical anomalies and radon-bearing groundwater.

== Precambrian ==
Late Precambrian (Neoproterozoic) rocks occur either side of the Church Stretton valley and in the vicinity of the Wrekin and Haughmond Hill, each intimately associated with the Welsh Borderland Fault System.

== Cambrian ==
There are only a few limited localities in Shropshire where Cambrian rocks occur. Its portrayed extent was once greater within the county but the reassignment of the British Tremadocian to the Ordovician period, meant that areas previously mapped as being formed by rocks from that stage were re-labelled as Ordovician.

The Wrekin Quartzite lies unconformably on Uriconian volcanics and is itself conformably overlain at the Ercall by the sandstones of the Lower Comley Sandstone Formation. The presence of the mineral glauconite gives these latter rocks a green-brown colour. Lower Comley shales and sandstones also occur in a small and largely fault-bound area at Lilleshall alongside mudstones and siltstones of the Dolgellau Formation. Sandstones and mudstones of the Upper Comley Sandstone Formation unconformably overlie the Lower Comley strata. The fossiliferous Lower Comley Limestones were the first in Britain to yield Lower Cambrian fossils; the site at Comley Quarry is managed as a geological reserve in respect of its importance to the history of geological science.

== Ordovician ==
Rocks of Ordovician age occur in a belt of country to the east of Church Stretton and again in a belt stretching south from Pontesbury through Stiperstones and westwards to the eastern side of the Vale of Montgomery. There is a further occurrence along the county boundary to the south and west of Oswestry.

== Silurian ==
Worldwide the Silurian period is divided into four epochs; Llandovery, Wenlock, Ludlow and Pridoli, the second and third of which derive their name from Shropshire localities, reflecting the work of nineteenth century geologists in this area in understanding the rock sequences laid down during this period of geological time.

The earliest Silurian rocks locally are the Pentamerus and Purple Shales formations, both being assigned to the Llandovery epoch. Their outcrop to the southeast of the Church Stretton Fault Zone extends from Wistanstow northeast to Buildwas. Overlying these to the southeast is the mudstone-dominated Coalbrookdale Formation which was traditionally known as the Wenlock Shale. It extends through the Sheinwoodian and Homerian ages which together constitute the Wenlock epoch. The Much Wenlock Limestone Formation (formerly simply the Wenlock Limestone) forms the long northwest-facing escarpment of Wenlock Edge. Immediately to its southeast is the discontinuous strike valley known as Hope Dale which is formed within the siltstones and mudstones of the Lower Ludlow Shales. Nowadays these Gorstian age strata are given 'group' status. A broken secondary scarp is formed by the overlying Aymestry Limestone Formation (formerly the Aymestry Group), also of Gorstian age. At the foot of its dip-slope are the outcrops of the Pridoli age Downton Castle Sandstone and Temeside Mudstone formations. At the base of the former is the Ludlow Bone Bed, representing the base of the Old Red Sandstone sequence of the Anglo-Welsh Basin.

Further southeast again runs the parallel Corve Dale which is developed in the Raglan Mudstone Formation, also of Pridoli age. The southeastern edge of Corve Dale is provided by the outcrop of the overlying St Maughans Formation, the base of which is marked by the thick and regionally extensive calcrete known as the Bishop's Frome Limestone Formation which marks the transition from the Silurian to the Devonian. This unit was traditionally referred to as the Psammosteus Limestone. Small fault-defined inliers of parts of this sequence occur in the Neen Sollars and Caynham areas of the south of the county.

Northwest of the Church Stretton Fault Zone, the Pentamerus and Purple Shales wrap around the southern and western margins of the block of Precambrian rocks of the Long Mynd and the district extending west to the Vale of Montgomery. They are overlain by the sandstones, siltstones and mudstones variously of the Sheinwoodian age Bromsleymill Shale Formation and then by the Aston Mudstone, Oakeley Mynd and Bailey Hill formations of Homerian through Gorstian to Ludfordian age. The succeeding Knucklas Castle, Cefn Einion and Clun Forest formations form the core of the Clun Forest range on the county's western border with Wales. These sequences are further overlain by the Temeside Mudstone and the overlying Raglan Mudstone around Vennington between Westbury and Long Mountain.

== Devonian ==
Stratigraphically above the Bishop's Frome Limestone is the thick sequence of mudstones, with occasional sandstones, known as the St Maughans Formation, the lowermost part of the Devonian succession in Shropshire, assigned to the Early Devonian epoch. The outcrop occupies much of the country between Ludlow and Bridgnorth and extending to the county boundary south of Cleobury Mortimer. The Emsian age Clee Sandstone Formation overlies the St Maughans rocks around Cleobury Mortimer. In a tract of country to the south of Stottesdon, the Clee Sandstone is overlain by the yellow and sometimes pebbly Farlow Sandstone Formation. Together with the Pridoli strata, these Devonian rocks constitute the Old Red Sandstone of Shropshire.

== Carboniferous ==
The earliest Carboniferous rocks, the Village Farm and Jackie Parr Limestone formations, are seen in the Lilleshall inlier where they unconformably overlie the Old Red Sandstone sequence. These are in turn overlain unconformably by the Lydebrook Sandstone and Sylvan Limestone formations. Within the latter is the Little Wenlock Basalt.

Parts of several small coalfields are found within Shropshire - the Coalbrookdale, Clee Hills, Wyre Forest, Leebotwood and Shrewsbury coalfields, together with the southernmost extension of the Denbighshire Coalfield around Oswestry.

At Clee Hill, the Oreton Limestone is succeeded by the Cornbrook Sandstone above which is a sandstone at the base of the Lower Coal Measures. This is overlain by mudstones within which are several coal seams. The sequence is intruded by a sill of dolerite (known locally as 'dhustone'). At Brown Clee, Pennine Coal Measures lying directly on the late Devonian Clee Sandstone, form the upper parts of Abdon Burf and Clee Burf though the summits themselves are formed by an igneous intrusion of dolerite.

Generally the Upper Coal Measures are separated from the lower and middle Coal Measures by an unconformity in the English Midlands, though historically it was erroneously thought to be a faulted contact and known as the Symon Fault. Strata underlying the unconformity have typically been folded by Variscan earth movements. Many of the coalfields are bounded by faults associated with this mountain-building episode.

== Permo-Trias ==
East-west directed crustal tension initiated during the Permian period led to the development of the Cheshire Basin as one of a series of linked sedimentary basins stretching north from the English Channel through the English Midlands to the Irish Sea. This rift system continued to operate throughout the Triassic period and into the Jurassic, with sedimentary rocks from each of these periods being found at outcrop across the northern half of Shropshire. The southern part of the basin lies across north Shropshire and is continuous in the east with the smaller Stafford Basin, parts of which extend into eastern Shropshire. The southeastern margin of the deep Wem-Audlem Sub-basin, at the heart of the southern part of the Cheshire Basin is defined within Shropshire by the northeast-southwest trending Wem Fault. Further southeast is the sub-parallel Hodnet Fault which forms the outer boundary of the larger basin with the area between the two faults hosting a thinner Permo-Triassic sediment sequence and termed the Ternhill Terrace.

Within Britain, the rocks of the Permian and Triassic periods are often lumped together as the Permo-Triassic and, typified as they are by desert sandstones, also labelled the New Red Sandstone. In Shropshire they extend across the North Shropshire Plain, itself a southerly continuation of the Cheshire Plain where similar rocks are to be found. Much of this flat area is covered by more recent deposits but sandstone hills are prominent at Ruyton, Nesscliffe, Myddle, Grinshill and Hawkstone. Rocks from these periods also underlie the plains in the east of the county.

The names of the various sequences have undergone a number of changes. The Enville member of the Salop Formation (formerly the Enville Beds) comprises a sequence of Carboniferous to Permian age sandstones, conglomerates and breccias up to 110m thick which occur in the east. To the west are sporadic outcrops of the Alberbury Breccia (a.k.a. Cardeston Stone). These are both unconformably overlain by the Bridgnorth Sandstone, formerly thought to be Triassic in age, best exposed in the cliffs of the town which has lent them its name. These are aeolian 'millet seed' sandstones which originated as desert dunes.

During the Early Triassic epoch, a river system flowed from the south bringing sand and gravel (rounded quartz pebbles) which formed what were once known as the Bunter Pebble Beds, later the Kidderminster Conglomerate and to the north, the Chester Pebble Beds but which are now known (along with a host of other locally named rocks) as the Chester Formation. The Chester Formation is overlain by the Helsby Sandstone Formation, a name which encompasses the Grinshill and Ryton sandstones.

== Jurassic ==
The Permo-Triassic age rocks are overlain by Jurassic deposits in the area around Wem and Prees. These are assigned to the Lias Group, the lower parts of which are late Triassic in age. Though largely concealed, outcrops of Dyrham Formation sandstones and mudstones near Prees are of Pliensbachian age and hence wholly Jurassic.

== Igneous rocks ==
There are Neoproterozoic age intrusions at the Wrekin and Haughmond Hill and again in the South Shropshire Hills. A sill of microgabbro (dolerite) was intruded into the Pennine Coal Measures rocks at Kinlet during the Bolsovian stage of the Carboniferous. It forms a part of the Clee Hill swarm. A NW-SE aligned dyke of Palaeogene age cuts the sandstone at Clive. Sills intrude the late Carboniferous country rocks of both Brown Clee and Titterstone Clee, the latter are known to be of Westphalian age.

== Structure ==
Almost all of the geological structures within the county are aligned broadly northeast-southwest following the Caledonoid trend established during the Caledonian Orogeny.The Church Stretton Fault Zone is a major one whilst the Wem Fault Zone and Hodnet Fault faults partly define the southeastern extent of Cheshire Basin, the Shropshire portion of which is sometimes referred to as the North Shropshire Basin. The Jurassic outcrop is preserved within the shallow Prees Syncline, the axis of which parallels the Wem fault to its northwest. The Carboniferous outcrops in the Clee Hills are preserved along the axes of the Brown Clee and Titterstone Clee synclines which lie to either side of the Ludlow Anticline.

== Quaternary ==
=== Glacial legacy ===
Shropshire was doubtless affected by glacial ice during the Anglian glaciation but evidence for that does not remain. The county was subjected to incursions by glacial ice both of Welsh origin and of Irish Sea origin during the more recent Devensian ice age, a combination of the two ice-masses reaching their maximum extent over the county around 18,000 years ago when thicknesses over the plain were perhaps up to 400m. At this point Irish Sea Ice having advanced south across the Cheshire Plain reached as far as Wenlock Edge and the Wolverhampton area. Ice tongues from the Welsh Icesheet reached down the Teme, Clun and Onny valleys to the south of Long Mynd and Stiperstones though the higher ground remained ice-free. The Severn and Rea valleys were also occupied by Welsh ice moving either side of Long Mountain. The so-called Ellesmere and Welsh readvances occurred around 16,000 years ago but began retreating 1000 years later. All ice had gone by 11,000 years ago. A northwest-southeast aligned boundary between the two ice-masses is recognised between Ellesmere and Oswestry, its position changing over time. Southeast Shropshire remained unaffected by glaciers though as with other areas rising above the ice surface, the landscape was affected by intense periglaciation.

Till is up to 100m thick in parts of north Shropshire. Erratics within the till can be traced back to granite outcrops in southern Scotland and the Lake District as well as sources which are closer.

==== Meltwater channels ====
Glacial meltwater flowing beneath, beside or down-valley of the glaciers cut several gorges, the most significant of which is the Severn Gorge at Ironbridge. Its formation was traditionally ascribed to the overflowing of a hypothetical proglacial lake termed Lake Lapworth deemed to have covered much of northern Shropshire and adjacent parts of Staffordshire. The currently accepted explanation involves the proven existence of a major subglacial trench (now infilled by later sediments) beneath the ice sheet west of Shrewsbury and leading towards the gorge. Large quantities of water under considerable pressure were able to then move uphill and over the pre-existing watershed east of Buildwas, powerfully eroding it in the process and giving rise to the modern gorge feature, possibly during multiple glacial phases. The deeply incised Marrington Dingle conveys the Camlad north from Churchstoke and originates as the outflow from a glacial lake in the Churchstoke/Snead area. The Plowden gorge permits the Onny to flow east around the southern end of the Long Mynd and was also initiated by meltwater.

Sediment-filled valleys are recorded from the Telford area, one of which, the Lightmoor Channel, runs southeast from Madeley on a line sub-parallel to that of the Severn gorge. Another, the Oakengates Channel, approximates the line of the A442 immediately northeast of the town centre whilst a third, the Shifnal Channel, runs beneath the course of the Wesley Brook south from Shifnal.

==== Kettle holes ====
During deglaciation, ice masses often wasted away in situ to leave kettle holes, some of which remain today as part of the county's population of meres; there is a notable assemblage in the Ellesmere area. One kettle hole unearthed during gravel extraction at Condover in 1986 yielded numerous bones of a woolly mammoth.

==== Periglacial features ====
Freeze-thaw cycles operated on the exposed quartzites of Stiperstones leading to the development of rock tors and of patterned ground i.e. stone stripes and polygons. Dolerite screes on Titterstone Clee also date from such processes at that time.

=== Landslips ===
There are numerous landslips recorded within the Ironbridge gorge and further downstream around Apley Forge and along parts of the Borley Brook, near Highley. Landslips have also occurred within Clun Forest.

=== Alluvium ===
River silt, sands and gravels (termed alluvium) occupy the floodplains of the major Shropshire rivers with especially widespread floodplains around the confluence of the Vyrnwy with the Severn on the county's western margins and downstream of Shrewsbury. Multiple terraces are developed within the valley of the Severn and that of the Worfe which joins it north of Bridgnorth.

== Published work ==
The Geological Survey Memoirs provide the most comprehensive details of the local geology but unfortunately not all the county is covered and all are now dated - most were published nearly a century ago. The last traditional memoir was that for Sheet 166 (Church Stretton) published in 1968; the Telford Memoir incorporates the studies undertaken for the new town development, on which it concentrates (published 1995) and the most recent (2001) is for Sheet 165 (Welshpool), which includes a little of the extreme west of the county. Otherwise the most comprehensive description is contained within Peter Toghill's book.

Details of local and regional studies are published by the Shropshire Geological Society.

== See also ==
- Geology of Great Britain
- Wenlock Edge
- Long Mynd#Geology
- Longmyndian Supergroup
- Uriconian
