= List of Sites of Special Scientific Interest in Shropshire =

This is a list of the Sites of Special Scientific Interest (SSSIs) in Shropshire. For other counties, see List of SSSIs by Area of Search

- Allscott Settling Ponds
- Alveley Grindstone Quarry
- Attingham Park
- Berrington Pool
- Betton Dingle And Gulley Green
- Blodwel Marsh
- Bomere, Shomere And Betton Pools
- Brown Moss
- Brownheath Moss
- Buildwas River Section
- Buildwas Sand Quarry
- Bullhill Brook
- Bush Wood And High Wood
- Catherton Common
- Chermes Dingle
- Chorley Covert And Deserts Wood
- Clarepool Moss
- Claverley Road Cutting
- Clee Hill Quarries
- Clunton Coppice
- Cole Mere
- Comley Quarry
- Cornbrook Dingle
- Coston Farm Quarries
- Coundmoor Brook
- Craig Sychtyn
- Crofts Mill Pasture
- Cuckoopen Coppice
- Derrington Meadow
- Devil's Hole, Morville
- Earl's Hill & Habberley Valley
- Eaton Track
- Farley Dingle
- Fenemere
- Fenn's, Whixall, Bettisfield, Wem & Cadney Mosses
- Fernhill Pastures
- Flat Coppice
- Granham's Moor Quarry
- Green Farm Quarry
- Grinshill Quarries
- Hencott Pool
- Hill Houses & Crumpsbrook Meadows
- Hillend Quarry
- Hodnet Heath
- Hope Bowdler Outcrops
- Hope Valley
- Hope Valley Meadows
- Hughley Brook
- Huglith Mine
- Lin Can Moss
- Lincoln Hill
- Linley Big Wood
- Llanymynech And Llynclys Hills
- Long Mynd
- Longville To Stanway Road Section
- Lydebrook Dingle
- Marked Ash Meadows
- Marsh Wood Quarry
- Marton Pool
- Meadowtown Quarry
- Melverley Farm
- Minsterley Meadows
- Montgomery Canal (Aston Locks - Keeper's Bridge)
- Morton Pool And Pasture
- Muxton Marsh
- New Hadley Brickpit
- Newport Canal
- Oak Dingle
- Old River Bed, Shrewsbury
- Onny River Section
- Oss Mere
- Pennerley Meadows
- Prees Branch Canal
- Prees Heath
- Prescott Corner
- Prince's Rough
- Rhos Fiddle
- River Clun at Broadward
- River Dee (England)
- River Severn at Montford
- River Teme
- Ruewood Pastures
- Sheinton Brook
- Shelve Church Section
- Shelve Pool
- Shrawardine Pool
- Snailbeach Mine
- Soudley Quarry
- Spy Wood & Aldress Dingle
- Stocking Meadows, Oreton
- Sweat Mere And Crose Mere
- Sweeney Fen
- Tar Grove Quarry
- Teme Bank
- Temeside
- Thatchers Wood And Westwood Covert
- The Lump, Priestweston
- The Stiperstones & The Hollies
- The Wrekin & The Ercall
- Tick Wood And Benthall Edge
- Titterstone Clee
- Trefonen Marshes
- Trewern Brook
- Tyrley Canal Cutting
- Upper Millichope Stream Section
- View Edge Quarries
- Wenlock Edge
- White Mere
- Whitwell Coppice
- Wolverton Wood And Alcaston Coppice
- Wyre Forest
