= Shropshire Hills National Landscape =

Area of Outstanding Natural Beauty in England

Coordinates: 52.495°N 2.816°W

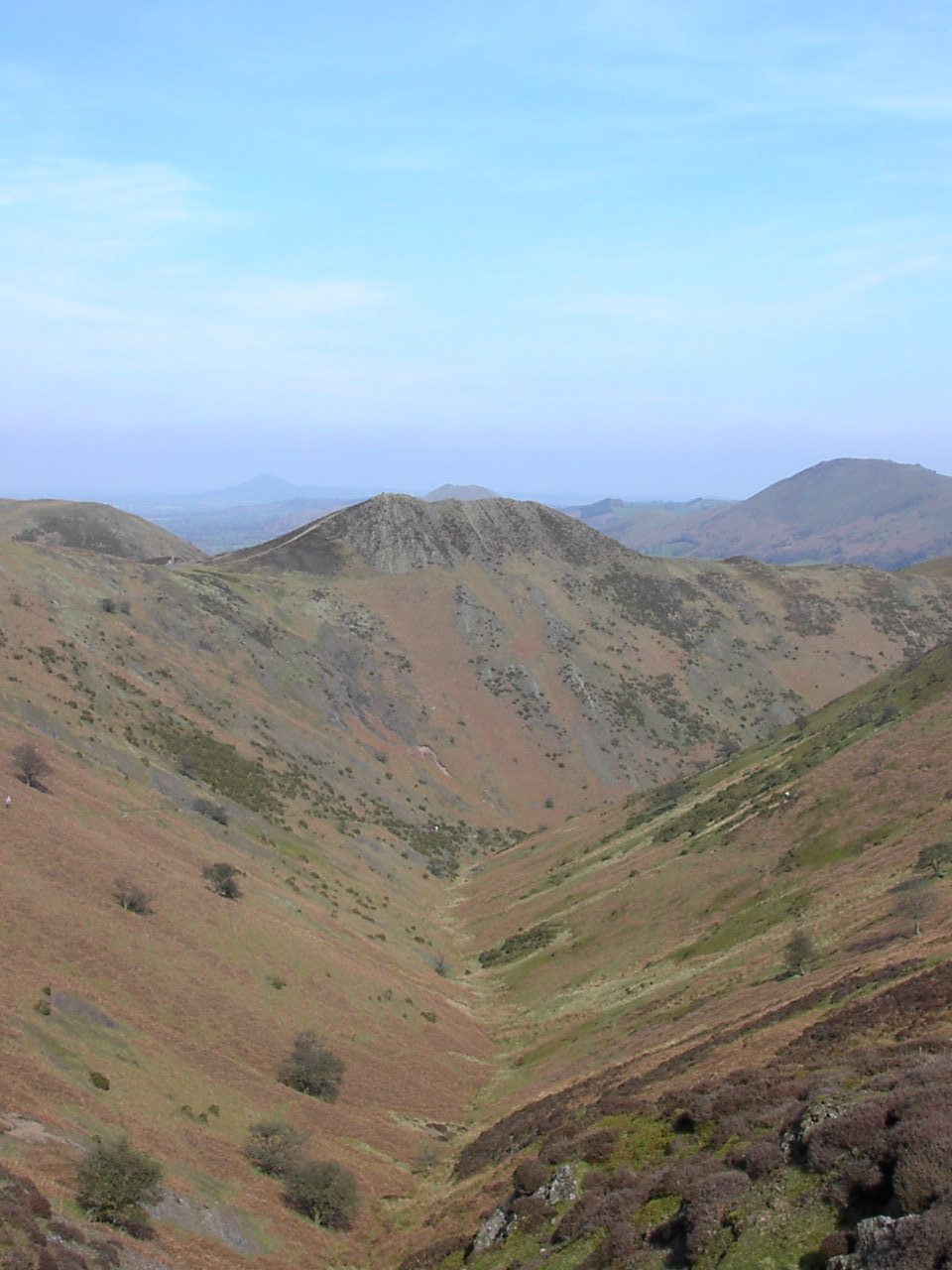
- Townbrook Valley in the Long Mynd.

- Location of the Shropshire Hills AONB in England
- Location: Shropshire, England
- Area: 802 km^{2} (310 sq mi)
- Established: 1958
- Governing body: Shropshire Hills AONB Partnership
- Website: www.shropshirehillsaonb.co.uk

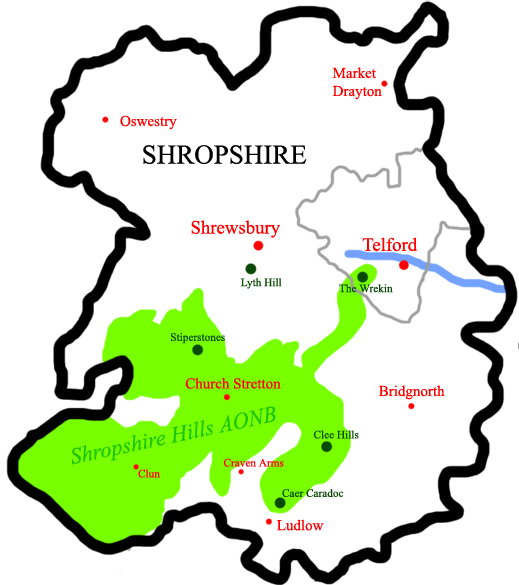
Map of Shropshire, with the Shropshire Hills National Landscape in green.

The Shropshire Hills National Landscape is a designated National Landscape in Shropshire, England. It is located in the south of the county, extending to its border with Wales. Designated in 1958, the area encompasses 802 square kilometres (310 sq mi) of land primarily in south-west Shropshire, taking its name from the upland region of the Shropshire Hills. The A49 road and Welsh Marches Railway Line bisect the area north–south, passing through or near Shrewsbury, Church Stretton, Craven Arms and Ludlow.

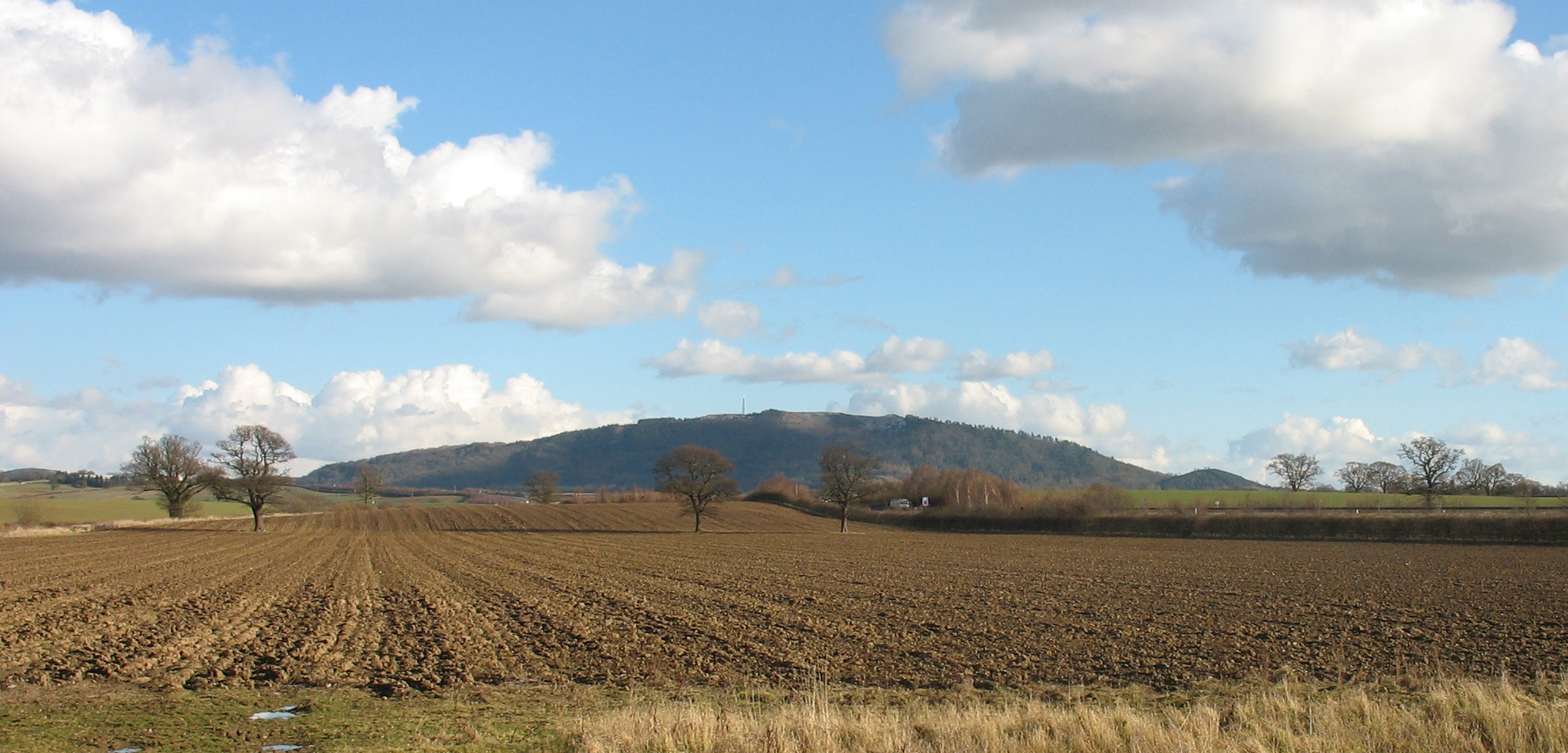
The Wrekin near Wellington.

== Hills ==
The Shropshire Hills, located in the Welsh Marches, are relatively high: the highest point in the county, Brown Clee Hill, near Ludlow, has an altitude of 540 metres (1,772 ft). This gives Shropshire the 13th highest hill per county in England. Titterstone Clee Hill, part of the Clee Hills, is nearly as high as Brown Clee, at 533 metres (1,749 ft), making it the third highest hill in the county. The Stiperstones are the second highest, at 536 metres (1,759 ft), and are notable for their tors of quartzite; particularly notable are Devil's Chair (SO368991) and Shepherd's Rock (SO373998).

More accessible hills are the Long Mynd, which covers an area of 5,436 acres (22.0 km^{2}) and peaks at Pole Bank at a height of 516 metres (1,693 feet), is near Church Stretton. It includes Carding Mill Valley, a popular recreational area which was developed as a honeypot to draw tourists away from the more sensitive/protected areas of the Mynd. One of the most famous hills is the Caer Caradoc, at 459 metres (1,506 ft) which is just by the village of All Stretton. The Wrekin (407 metres (1,335 ft)), located in the far northeastern panhandle of the National Landscape, is an extremely popular hill with a well-used trail. Located near Wellington, its position close to the major population centres of Shropshire, and good transport links (A5/M54) make it easy to access. Ercall Hill, a notable geological site, is located just to the north of The Wrekin.

Another prominent hill is Corndon Hill, whose summit is in Wales.

== Towns and villages ==
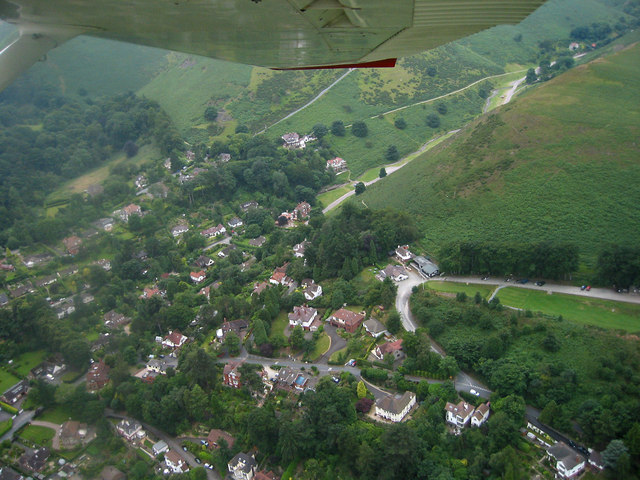
Church Stretton is the larger of the two towns in the National Landscape, the other being Clun.

The largest town in the National Landscape is Church Stretton (sometimes known as "Little Switzerland"), with a population of about 3,000. The only other town within the boundaries of the National Landscape is Clun, with fewer than 1,000 people, in the Clun Valley.

Ludlow, the largest town in South Shropshire, lies just south of the National Landscape. The Shropshire Hills National Landscape Partnership is based at Craven Arms, just outside the development restriction boundaries. Bishop's Castle is a small town of about 1,500 people, located near the Welsh border to the west. Bucknell is a notable village in the south. Knighton has a population of just over 3,000 is across the River Teme in Wales, but its station is within the Shropshire Hills National Landscape.

== Local authorities ==
The National Landscape falls largely within the Shropshire Council area. Its north-easternmost extremity, in the vicinity of the prominent Wrekin hill, is located in the borough of Telford & Wrekin.

== Rivers ==
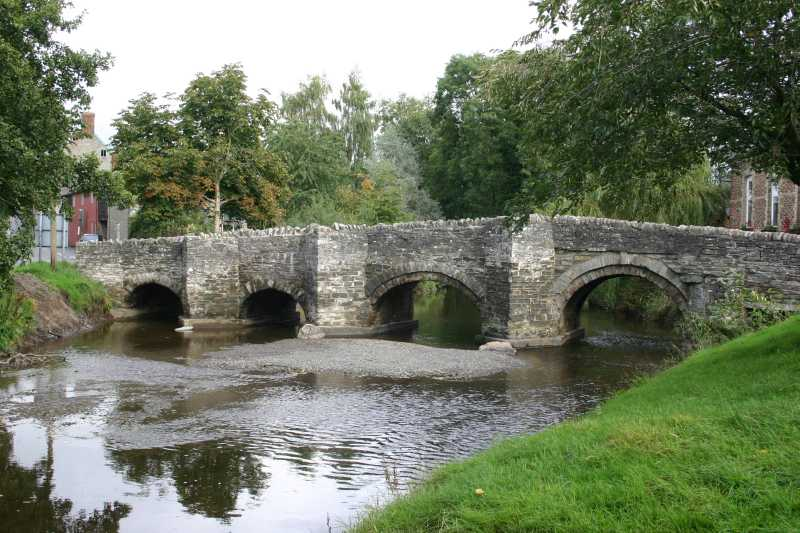
Bridge over the River Clun in the town of Clun.

- River Clun – starting at Anchor, ends up joining the Teme
- Cound Brook – Rises from minor watercourses running off the Long Mynd and Caer Caradoc before discharging into the River Severn
- River Teme – flows through Knighton down to Bucknell then Ludlow, before passing into Herefordshire
- River Rea – flows north to south, passes through Cleobury Mortimer

== Historical attractions ==
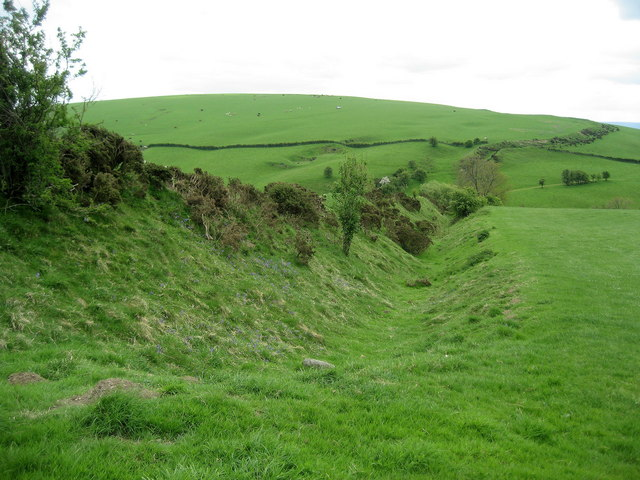
Stretch of Offa's Dyke near Clun.

Attractions of historical interest located within or near the National Landscape include Stokesay Castle (near Craven Arms), a well-preserved fortified manor house.

Ludlow Castle in Ludlow was constructed in the 11th century as the border stronghold of one of the Marcher Lords, Roger de Lacy.

Offa's Dyke, a massive linear earthwork, also runs through the area, and across the Clun Valley area.

Clun Castle is located near Clun.

== Wildlife ==
- Peregrine falcon
- White-throated dipper
- Ring ouzel
- Merlin
- Eurasian curlew
- Eurasian tree sparrow
- European pied flycatcher
- Western barn owl
- Red fox
- Eurasian badger
- Red grouse
- European turtle dove
- Common buzzard
- Common snipe
- Northern lapwing
- Common redshank
- Red Kite
- Pine Marten
- Common raven
- European goldfinch

== Principal summits ==
The following summits within the National Landscape have more than 30 metres of topographic prominence:

1. Brown Clee Hill (540.5m)
2. Stiperstones (536.9m)
3. Titterstone Clee Hill (533.2m)
4. Long Mynd (516.6m)
5. Clee Burf (510.5m)
6. Yearlet (465.8m)
7. Grindle (460.2m)
8. Caer Caradoc Hill (459.5m)
9. Knolls (457.5m)
10. Heath Mynd (452.6m)
11. Black Mountain (448m)
12. Cothercott Hill (443.7m)
13. Black Hill (441m)
14. Garn Rock Hill (438.3m)
15. Rock Hill (435.2m)
16. Stow Hill (434.3m)
17. Llanfair Hill (432.2m)
18. Hope Bowdler Hill (426m)
19. Colebatch Hill (416m)
20. Dowke Hill (416m)
21. Callow (412.3m)
22. Cefn Hepreas (412.3m)
23. Ratlinghope Hill (411.5m)
24. Linley Hill (411.2m)
25. Cwm-Sanaham Hill (409.1m)
26. Hergan (409m)
27. Linley Hill North Top (408.9m)
28. Bryn Hill (408m)
29. The Wrekin (406.9m)
30. Stapeley Hill (402.9m)
31. Caer Caradoc (Chapel Lawn) (402.6m)
32. Black Rhadley Hill (402.1m)
33. Cefn Gunthly (400.8m)
34. Shelve Hill (399.5m)
35. Gatten Hill (399m)
36. Ragleth Hill (397.5m)
37. Hodre Hill (397m)
38. Hopton Titterhill (397m)
39. Sunnyhill (394.1m)
40. Clun Hill (394m)
41. Bromlow Callow (384m)
42. Paulith Bank (383m)
43. Castle Idris (381m)
44. Llanwolley Hill (380.3m)
45. The Lawley (377m)
46. Nick Knolls (375m)
47. Mucklewick Hill (373m)
48. Swinbatch Hill (373m)
49. Adstone Hill (371.5m)
50. Graig Hill (371m)
51. Bucknell Hill (365m)
52. Steppleknoll (365m)
53. Lordshill (364m)
54. Myndtown Hill (361m)
55. Burrow (358.1m)
56. Buxton Hill (347m)
57. Hazler Hill (347m)
58. Bucknell Hill South Top (346m)
59. Helmeth Hill (344m)
60. Clunton Hill (342m)
61. Mount Pleasant (342m)
62. Waverhous Wood (340m)
63. Callow Hill (339.6m)
64. Bryn (331m)
65. Radnor Wood (331m)
66. Yell Bank (329.9m)
67. Huglith Hill (329m)
68. Burlow Hill (327m)
69. Middlehope Hill (325.3m)
70. Wart Hill (324.4m)
71. Cefn Hepreas SE Top (322m)
72. Earl's Hill (319.5m)
73. Diddlebury Common (316m)
74. Hopesay Hill (315m)
75. Guilden Down (313m)
76. Short Wood (313m)
77. Oakeley Mynd (309m)
78. Nover's Hill (305m)
79. Clunbury Hill (304m)
80. Lodge Hill (304m)
81. Lynchgate Hill (303.1m)
82. Hungerford Hill (302m)
83. Hungerford Hill SW Top (301m)
84. Basford Bank (299m)
85. Cwm-brain Hill (295m)
86. Hill End (294m)
87. Norton Camp (291.8m)
88. Broom Hill (288m)
89. Bucknell Wood Hill (287m)
90. Lilywood Hill (287m)
91. Church Hill (286m)
92. Fegg Hill (286m)
93. Broome Hill (279m)
94. Roman Bank (279m)
95. Bowman Hill (278m)
96. Easthope Wood (274m)
97. Shipton Hill (273.8m)
98. Blakeway Coppice (272.5m)
99. Blakemoor (270m)
100. The Ercall (268m)
101. Roveries Wood (262m)
102. Wolverton Hill (254m)
103. Oaker Wood (243m)
104. Lawrence's Hill (231m)
105. Acton Bank (229m)
106. Brockhurst Wood (228m)
107. Radlith (205m)

The following summits in Shropshire outside the National Landscape are more than 300 metres high:

1. Craig y Rhiw (362m)
2. Bakers Hill (356m)
3. Mynydd Myfyr (341m)
4. Hargrave Bank (324.7m)
5. View Edge (321.7m)
6. Graig Wen (317.8m)

== Other attractions ==
- Clun Forest – remote area of woodland and hills
- Wyre Forest – large woodland, half of which is in Shropshire, the other half in Worcestershire
