= Shropshire Wildlife Trust =

Wildlife trust in England

Coordinates: 52.707°N 2.7447°W

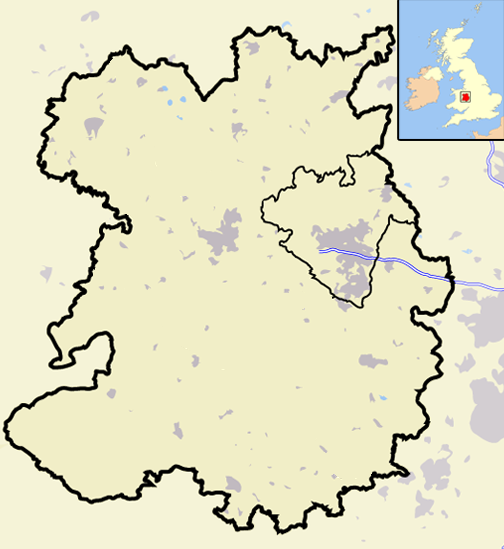
- Map of Shropshire with Telford and Wrekin shown within
- Formation: 1964
- Type: Registered Charity
- Purpose: campaigns for wildlife and the environment; looks after nature reserves; encourages and educates about nature conservation
- Headquarters: 193 Abbey Foregate, Shrewsbury SY2 6AH
- Coordinates: 52.707 N, 2.7447 W
- Region served: Shropshire, Telford & Wrekin
- Members: ~11,000
- Director: Colin Preston
- Main organ: Trust Council
- Parent organization: The Wildlife Trusts (partnership)
- Budget: £1,098,853 (FY 2010–11)
- Staff: ~30
- Volunteers: ~400
- Website: www.shropshirewildlifetrust.org.uk

The Shropshire Wildlife Trust (SWT) is a wildlife trust covering the geographic county of Shropshire, England.

== Nature reserves ==
The trust manages 42 nature reserves (plus its headquarters in Shrewsbury – see next section) in the county:

North Shropshire
- Birch Road Pond, near Ellesmere
- Bwlytai Wood, near Oswestry
- Craig Sychtyn, near Llynclys
- Dolgoch Quarry, near Llynclys
- Greenfields, near Whitchurch
- Jones' Rough, near Llanymynech
- Llanymynech Rocks
- Llynclys Common
- Melverley Meadows, near Ash Magna
- Prees Branch Canal
- Quarry Wood
- Ruewood, near Wem
- Sweeney Fen, near Llynclys
- Wem Moss
- Wood Lane, near Wem
Central and South Shropshire
- Betchcott Hill
- Brook Vessons
- Earl's Hill, near Pontesbury
- Holly Banks, near Melverley
- Hope Valley, near Minsterley
- Granville Country Park, in Telford
- Nipstone (Stiperstones)
- The Ercall
- The Hollies
- Catherton Common
- Clunton Coppice
- Comley Quarry, near Church Stretton
- Cramer Gutter
- Harton Hollow
- Lower Shortditch Turbary (Clun Forest)
- Lurkenhope Wood
- Rhos Fiddle
- Whitcliffe Common, Ludford

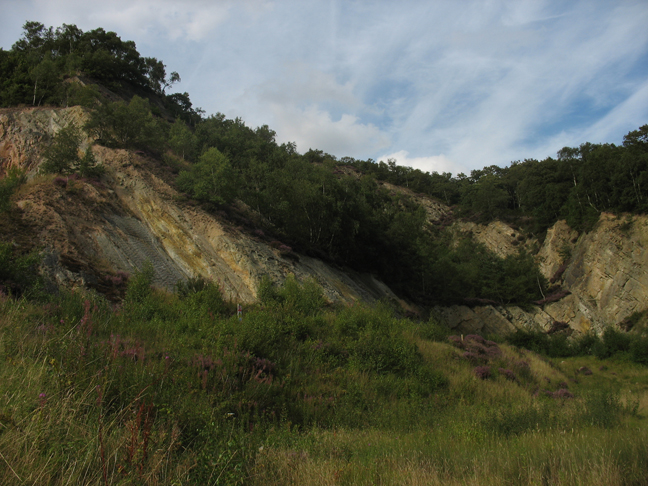
A former quarry at The Ercall

== Headquarters ==
The Trust has its main offices and visitor centre at 193 Abbey Foregate near the centre of Shrewsbury – they occupy the former "Shrewsbury Quest" museum, on the corner of Abbey Foregate and Old Potts Way, opposite The Abbey church. The site encompasses a restored medieval building known as the Old Infirmary and a 1730s building called Queen Anne House, as well as gardens, including a herb garden established when the site was the Shrewsbury Quest, and a fruit tree garden. The centre and its gardens is open to the public (usually Monday – Saturday) and has a shop as well as conference rooms available for hire. Many Trust-run events take place here, including children's events during the summer holidays. Every year the centre receives approximately 25,000 visitors.

== Local branches ==
The Trust currently has 10 local branches active in the county:

- Bridgnorth
- Clun and Bishop's Castle
- Ellesmere
- Ludlow
- Market Drayton
- Newport
- Oswestry
- Shrewsbury
- Strettons, The
- Whitchurch

Additionally, in the Telford area the Trust has helped establish the "Telford and Wrekin Forest" initiative, and has "Wrekin Forest Volunteers".

== Specialist groups ==
The county has a wide range of specialist groups, which are associated with the Shropshire Wildlife Trust, including:

- Border Bryologists
- Butterfly Conservation West Midlands
- Shropshire Amphibian and Reptile Group
- Shropshire Badger Group
- Shropshire Barn Owl Group
- Shropshire Bat Group
- Shropshire Botanical Society
- Shropshire Fungus Group
- Shropshire Invertebrate Group
- Shropshire Mammal Group
- Shropshire Moth Group
- Shropshire Ornithological Society
- Shropshire Raven Study Group

== Membership ==
The Shropshire Wildlife Trust's membership is around 9,000 individuals This equates to roughly 2.2%, or 1 in 50 Shropshire residents. In addition to the membership of individuals, there are also corporate memberships, mainly of organisations (almost all private businesses) based in Shropshire, including Müller Dairy (UK), E.ON UK and Harper Adams University.

== See also ==
- Royal Society of Wildlife Trusts
- List of Conservation topics
- Conservation in the United Kingdom
