= Wrekin terrane =

Inferred basement rock terrane of the southern United Kingdom

Coordinates: 52.669°N 2.552°W

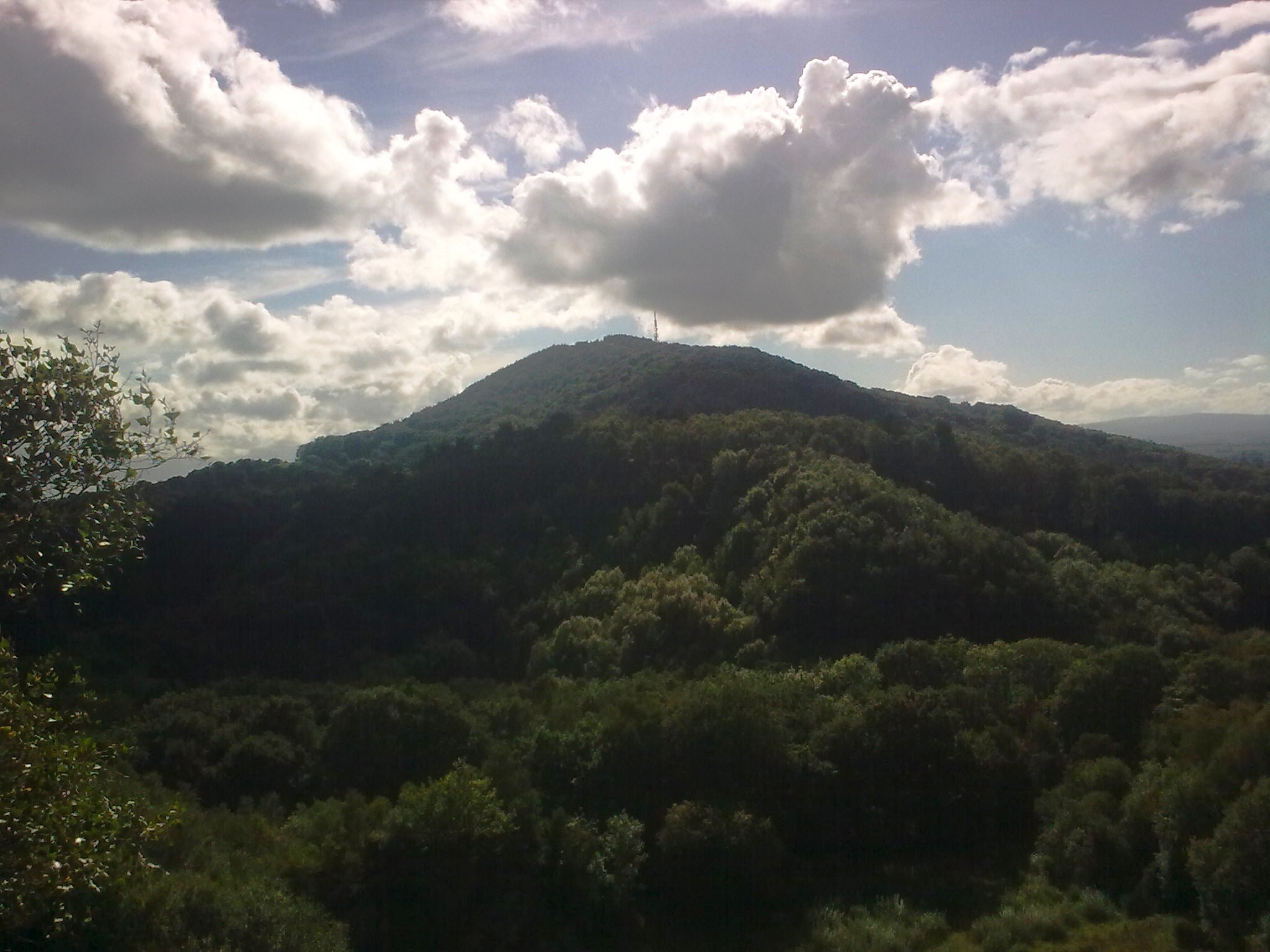
The Wrekin from Ercall Hill

The Wrekin terrane is one of five inferred fault bounded terranes that make up the basement rocks of the southern United Kingdom. The other notable geological terranes in the region are the Charnwood terrane, Fenland terrane, Cymru terrane and the Monian Composite terrane. The Wrekin terrane is bounded to the west by the Welsh Borderland fault system and to the east by the Malvern lineament. The geological terrane to the west is the Cymru Terrane and to the east is Charnwood Terrane. The majority of rocks in the area are associated with the outcrops that are evident at the faulted boundaries.

== Intrusive geology ==
The older rocks of the terrane rest in the Precambrian with younger Cambrian rocks resting unconformably upon them. The Precambrian rocks are noted to be calc-alkaline plutonic intrusions dated to approximately 700-600 Ma (Phase 1 to Phase 2 Neoproterozoic). These have associated (younger) volcanics that dominate the overlying sedimentary rocks that date between 570 and 560 Ma. The signatures of the rocks are interpreted as having an intra-plate geochemical signature that may be attributed to arc-rifting. The diachronous formations of the bedded Uriconian and Coomb Volcanic Formation.

Metamorphic rock is thought to underlie the Wrekin terrane and is inferred from the outcrops associated with the Malvern Hills where outcrops of metasedimentary schist and gneiss are noted at Gullet Quarry (southern Malvern Hills). There are also outcrops of gneiss at Primrose Hill on the Welsh Borderland fault system.

=== Stanner–Hanter ===
The Stanner–Hanter complex outcrops in the terrane, the complex is a magmatic intrusion (non-preserved) with a four-stage cross cutting history where acidic and basic rocks have been intermingled and hybridised with an interpreted age of 702 Ma +/-8 Ma (Stanner Hill Granophyre).

=== Malvern complex ===
On the other side of the terrane the Malvern complex is composed of diorite and tonalite plutons that have been altered by Proterozoic metamorphism (modifying the original igneous textures) by still exhibit calc-alkaline, magmatic arc geochemical signatures. The date of emplacement is interpreted to be 677 Ma +/- 2 Ma with upper greenschist-lower amphibolite metamorphic cooling ages of c.650 Ma although crustal recycling is inferred from the presence of inherited zircon of 1598 Ma +/- 32 Ma. The later phases of intrusion are noted within the Wrekin Range where the Uriconian rhyolite is cross cut with the Neoproterozoic Ercall Granophyre.

Granophyric Intrusion at The Ercall.

== Volcano-sedimentary geology ==
The sedimentary record in the area varies between volcaniclastic and siliciclastic deposition, the latter being present in the Longmynd area and the former being representative of the Stanner–Hanter and Malvern complex. Depositional facies include the Uriconian and the Longmyndian sequences. The relationship between the two is complex with some suggestion that the two are coeval and faulted as well as two unconformable strata. The former (coeval but different depositional facies) is supported by U-Pb Zircon dating from the Longmyndian bentonites. However, this is not definitive.

=== Uriconian ===
The Uriconian sedimentary geology is mainly composed of bimodal (acidic, intermediate and basic) intra-plate volcanics with only minimal influence from subduction. The interpreted overview of the depositional environment is that of a trans-tensional arc caused by oblique subduction. The sediments of the Uriconian are indicated to have been deposited rapidly with such volcanism being dated (U-Pb Zircon) at 566+/-2 Ma (Note the Uriconian is cross-cut by the Late Precambrian Ercall Granophyre dated 560+/-1 Ma.) The sequence is dominated by pyroclastic deposits, breccias and welded tuffs which is suggestive of a former volcanic centre being in close proximity and deposition in a subaerial environment.

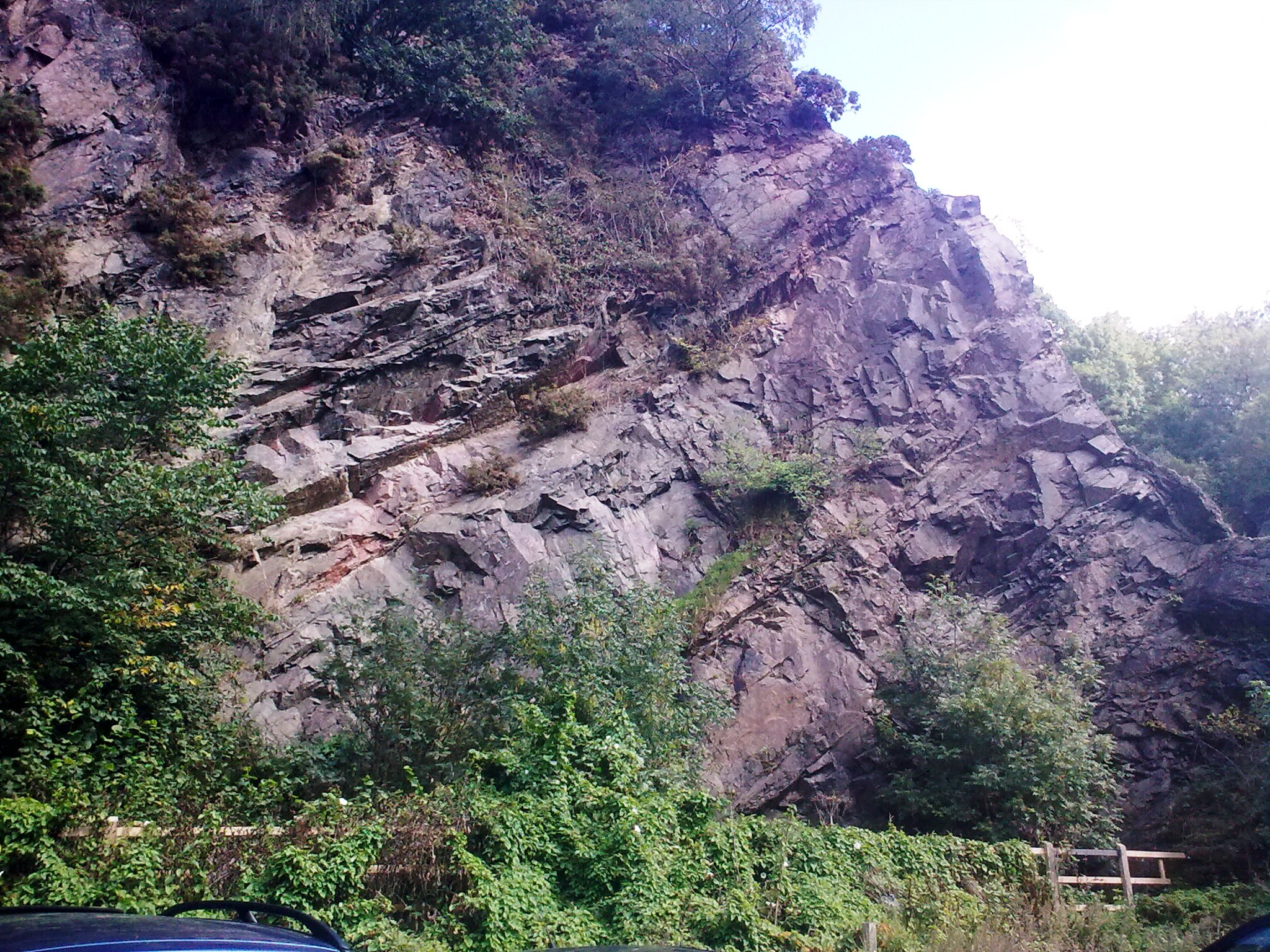
Photograph of Uriconian Sediments from the Forest Glen car park at the Wrekin

=== Coomb volcanic formation ===
The Coomb volcanic formation occupies much of the south-west of the Wrekin terrane and its associated inliers. The sequence is the most recent suite of Neoproterozoic rocks identified in southern Britain. The formation consists of over 1000 m of sediments deposited in a subaqueous environment (in contrast to the subaerial Uriconian). Explosive ash-flow tuffs mark the initial phase of deposition followed by rhyolite flows and domes. Bimodal deposition followed with lavas, minor intrusions, ash-flows and volcaniclastic rocks with some ash-flows exhibiting Ediacaran body fossils. The geochemistry notes that fractional crystallisation process within the magma chamber links the lavas with the tuffs and gives intra-plate as well as subduction geochemical signatures.

=== Warren House formation ===
The Malvern Hills represent another depositional environment for late Neoproterozoic sedimentation with the Warren House Formation being in thrust contact with the Malvern complex. The Warren House Formation is composed of pillow basalts, intermediate lavas, altered rhyolites and welded and non-welded acid tuffs with evidence to suggest that they are linked via fractional crystallisation. U-Pb zircon dating gives an age of 566 Ma+/-2 Ma. The geochemical signature from this sequence is contrasting to that of the rest of the Wrekin Terrane being of a volcanic arc formed on oceanic or on thin, immature continental crust.

=== Longmyndian supergroup ===
The supergroup consists of c.6000 m of sedimentary rocks with varying facies from basinal and distal turbidite to deltaic and fluviatile successions which exhibits a generally regressive sequence. The Longmyndian is separated into two main depositionally distinguishable units: the Stretton Group and the Wentnor Group. The succession is geographically positioned between the Pontesford–Linley fault system and the Church Stretton fault system which has been folded, possibly during the late Neoproterozoic, and is inferred to gently plunge to the south. The succession is predominantly siliciclastic but with minor intrusions noted. A basal age (from a bentonite horizon) of the Stretton Group is given as 555.9 Ma+/-3.5 Ma.

=== Palaeontology ===
The Wrekin terrane contains abundant evidence of Ediacara fauna which include the body fossil taxa Beltanelliformis brunsae and B. minutae. The body fossil Arumberia is also noted to be present in the Lightspout Formation of the Stretton Group.

== See also ==
- matground
