= Ercall =

Ercall may relate to a number of things in Shropshire, England:

- Ercall Hill, a small hill to the north of the Wrekin near Wellington
- High Ercall, a small village in Telford and Wrekin borough
  - Ercall Magna, a civil parish covering High Ercall and neighbouring places
- Child's Ercall, a small village and civil parish located between Newport and Market Drayton
