= Hinstock =

Village in Shropshire, England

Coordinates: 52.833°N 2.453°W

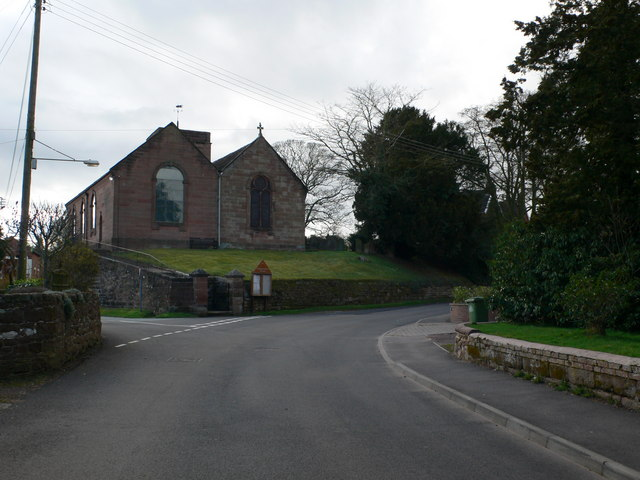
- St Oswald's Church, Hinstock

- Location within Shropshire
- Population: 1,382 (2021)
- OS grid reference: SJ694263
- Civil parish: Hinstock
- Unitary authority: Shropshire
- Ceremonial county: Shropshire
- Region: West Midlands
- Country: England
- Sovereign state: United Kingdom
- Post town: MARKET DRAYTON
- Postcode district: TF9
- Dialling code: 01952 550/551
- Police: West Mercia
- Fire: Shropshire
- Ambulance: West Midlands
- UK Parliament: North Shropshire

Hinstock is a village and civil parish in Shropshire, England.

It appeared in the Domesday Book survey as "Stoche" (from Old English stoc, "dependent settlement"); the present version of its name was created in the mediaeval period by prefixing Middle English hine ("domestic servants").

== Location ==
Hinstock is approximately halfway between the market towns of Newport and Market Drayton. The A41 road, which until the 1980s ran through its centre, now bypasses the village. Hinstock is at the junction of the A529 road which joins Nantwich to the A41. A Roman road still exists in part as a road and as a footpath through Hinstock. The settlement of High Heath is to the north of the village alongside the A41 and to the west of Hinstock (at grid reference SJ682260) and forming part of the civil parish is the hamlet of Pixley.

== Facilities ==
Hinstock's facilities include a primary school; a village shop and post office; St Oswald's Church of England parish church; a pub named the Falcon Inn; a village hall; a Methodist chapel; two tennis courts; a football pitch; a five a side court; a cricket pitch; a small snooker hall and a running club.

Near the village is a very small nature reserve, Quarry Wood, which is managed by the Shropshire Wildlife Trust.

== Recent history ==
Victorian hymn-writer and hymnologist John Ellerton was parish Rector of Hinstock from 1872 to 1876.

The village hall was built as a memorial after World War I, as was a wheel cross monument which stands at a junction in the village.

From 1941 to 1947 there was a co-located Royal Air Force and Royal Navy Fleet Air Arm training station called RNAS Hinstock (HMS Godwit), which specialised in instrument and blind landing technologies. The mansion Hinstock Hall, 1.75 miles (2.82km) east of the airfield, was commandeered as the station's officers' quarters. A Royal Navy officer and seaman from the base are buried in Hinstock Church's burial ground. In 2005 the former control tower of the airfield was converted into private house.

In 1983, David Williams, spotted the recently completed Pixley Lane Bridge over the new and not yet opened Hinstock bypass. Living locally he walked down and measured up and reckoned his Saab 91D Safir (Sapphire), a single-engined, light aircraft built in Holland would fit under the bridge. His father stood on the bridge with a camera to capture his stunt on the day before it opened to traffic but he was too quick with the shutter while a friend did get a 1980s quality picture, to prove it happened.

== See also ==
- Listed buildings in Hinstock
