= Quarry Wood, Hinstock =

Woodland nature reserve

Coordinates: 52°50′30″N 02°28′05″W

Quarry Wood nature reserve is a 7-acre (28,000 m^{2}) woodland on the west side of the A41 road at Hinstock in Shropshire that is managed by the Shropshire Wildlife Trust. Oak, birch and occasional hornbeam grow alongside swathes of rhododendron. The sandstone cliffs were formed in the Triassic period, around 220 million years ago, when this part of the country was hot and dry and dinosaurs were first emerging.

The quarry may have provided the stone for the tower of St Oswald's church in the village and also some of the older houses, though quarrying ceased in the 1890s.

The wood once provided cover for vast flocks of roosting thrushes and finches and, between 1966 and 1985, around 20,000 birds were ringed there. These birds no longer roost in such numbers, but the wood is home to a variety of birds including Eurasian jays, tits, Eurasian nuthatches, great spotted woodpeckers and other common woodland birds.
