= Uriconian =

Volcanic rocks found in parts of Shropshire, United Kingdom

Coordinates: 52.682°N 2.529°W

Uriconian is the name given to an assemblage of volcanic rocks found in parts of Shropshire, United Kingdom. The name relates to Uriconio, the Latin name for an Iron Age hillfort on the summit of the Wrekin, a hill formed of these rocks.

The Uriconian rocks of Shropshire (Wrekin terrane) are thought to be potentially related to the Longmyndian Supergroup of the Stretton Hills, Shropshire, United Kingdom. Current geological profiling of the terranes suggests that the Uriconian rocks are of Precambrian age (Neoproterozoic Phases 2 and 3). The Uriconian Rocks outcrop to the southeast of the Long Mynd area of the Welsh Borderland Fault System and beyond the Church Stretton Fault which trends northeast–southwest across the area. The Stretton Hills are composed primarily of arenaceous (quartz rich sand) beds assigned to the Longmyndian Supergroup. The Longmyndian rocks are a c.6 km (approximately 6 km) thick group of volcaniclastic and bentonitic sediment horizons. The Uriconian have long thought to be older than the Longmyndian and generally outcrop to the southeast of the latter within northeast–southwest trending lineaments suggesting basement influence for the regional structure.

The Uriconian rocks outcrop in areas from Wellington, Shropshire to Primrose Hill on the southwest side of The Wrekin, east of Caer Caradoc and in the Craven Arms Inlier. Primarily the strata exist as fault-bounded slices within splays of, and to the southeast of, the main Church Stretton fault system.

The Uriconian rocks comprise both intermediate to acidic and basic (bimodal) volcanic suites that reflect largely intraplate origins for the complex although some subduction signatures have been identified. Further work has led to suggest that the locality of this kind of volcanism is related to marginal basin volcanicity (behind the main arc) influenced by trans-tension brought about by oblique subduction.

The Neoproterozoic sediments were deposited on Avalonia in various strike-slip faulted basins and they comprise predominantly volcaniclastic and siliciclastic sediments.

== Overview ==
Britain during this period (late Precambrian/early Cambrian) lay about 70 degrees south of the equator at the margin of a large ocean (to the north) and with a large continental plate to the south, the ocean is accepting sediment from the continental block. The oceanic plate is subducting southwards underneath the continental block which is being buoyed by the rock which is subsequently being melted (partial melting) by the high temperatures and pressures associated with the process. As with all subduction zones an island arc is formed above the subducting plate (due to rising rock melt) with a back-arc basin existing between the island arc and the continental edge.

A large continental block existed with oceanic crust subducting underneath it. In front of the block and above the subducting oceanic plate are volcanoes emitting a range of varied deposits that give a spectrum of signatures (basaltic eruption, intermediate eruptions and acidic eruptions, as the material melting and rising changes over the period of the subduction). These volcanic deposits get mixed up with the sediment from the continent (now in the form of a back arc basin). These are the volcaniclastic deposits that we can see today at places such as The Wrekin.

During the formation of the volcanoes and their associated deposits of basalt and rhyolite there are melts that never reach the surface and these shallow level intrusions are notable in the forms of their non-extrusive equivalents such as granophyre and rhyolite. Granophyre is quite evident in the Ercall Quarries. The sediments and volcaniclastic sediments are of Precambrian Uriconian age and were deposited in rifts and basins that would have been sub-parallel to the back arc basin as subduction continued. Deep basins will have formed and sediments will have infilled the open space. Significant temperature and pressures are applied to these infill sediments and as such they were transformed to schist and gneiss (Primrose Hill Gneiss and Rushton Schist are examples).

The Uriconian Mountains were formed during this process to the northwest of the continental margin. The significant Longmyndian Supergroup sediments were deposited.

== Geological relationships ==
Photograph showing the contact relationship between the Neoproterozoic granophyre and the overlying Comley Sandstone

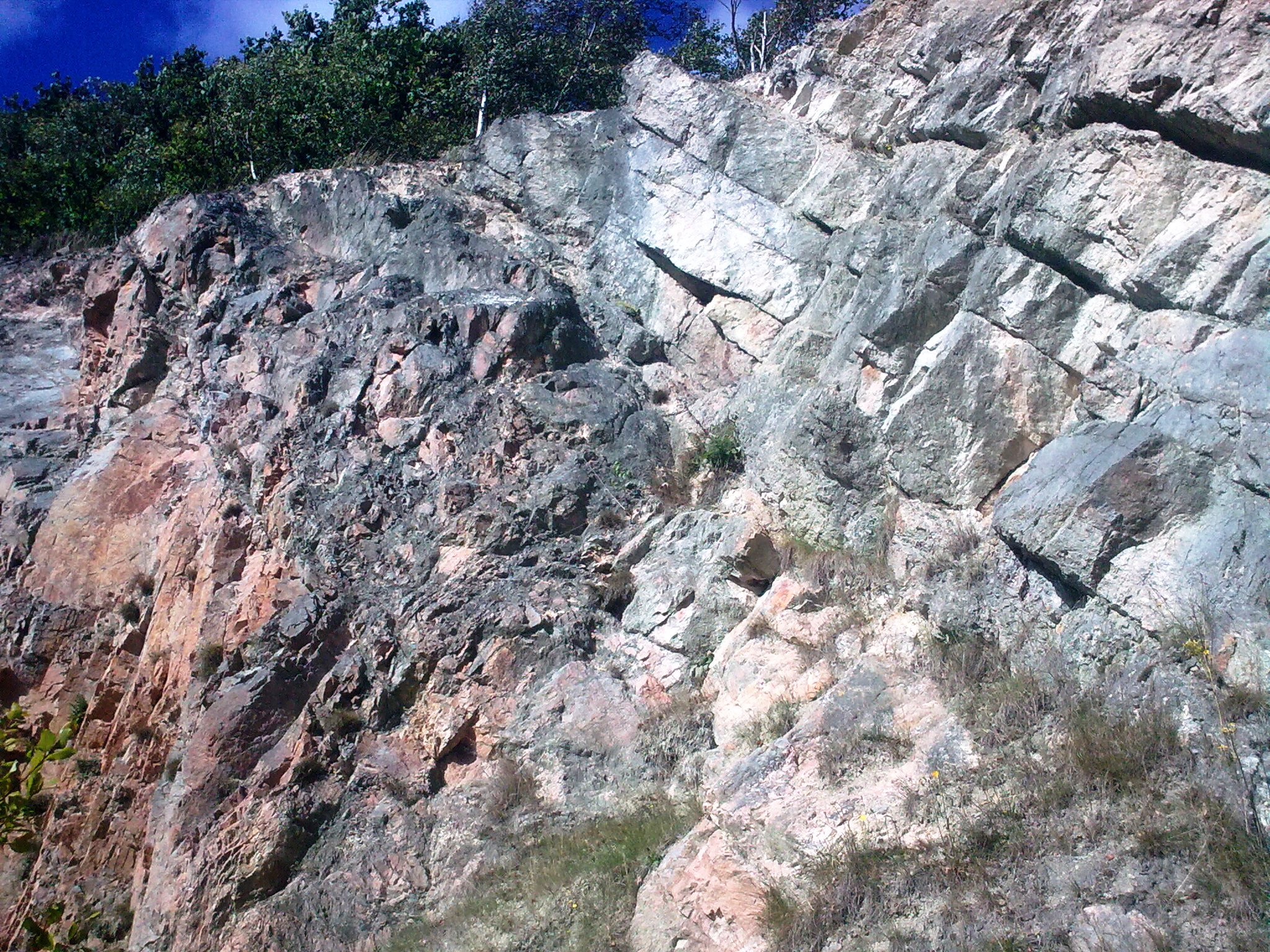
Another photograph showing the contact relationship between the Neoproterozoic granophyre and the overlying Comley Sandstone

There is much uncertainty about the exact age of the Uriconian rocks primarily due to the complex structure of the folded and faulted rocks. All contacts are discordant, hence no direct relationships with the Longmyndian Supergroup can de deduced, and a relative age has not been established.

Relationships to other potential lateral equivalents (from the eastern part of the Avalonia palaeo micro-continent known as the Monian terrane) are still conjectural albeit to varying degrees. The following relationships are all interpreted from figures presented in Brenchley (2006). The relationship to the Longmyndian Supergroup is generally accepted as coeval for the Shropshire/South Wales area. Other Neoproterozoic phase II (NP2) rocks of similar age are the Warren House formation of the Malvern Hills (566 +/-2 Ma), South Charnwood diorites (of the Charnwood Terrane – these stretch back into NP1 though), Fachwen & Minfordd formations (Arfon/Llyn area), and the blueschist metamorphosed Aethwy terrane blueschists.

== Other notes ==
Given the steep dip of the Uriconian rocks relative to the shallow inclination of the Cambrian, the Uriconian the tectonic events can be classed as pre-Atdabanian (Stage 2, Lower Cambrian). Zircon dating has given similar ages of 566.6+/-2.9Ma from the Longmyndian Supergroup and 566+/-2Ma for the Uriconian Volcanics.

This leads to suggest that the area was affected by (Uriconian) volcanism and associated events between 570 and 550 Ma including the intrusion of the Ercall Granophyre. This potentially created a thermal extension of the area allowing sedimentation to occur within the basin.
