= Longville To Stanway Road Section =

Protected area in Shropshire, England

Coordinates: 52.530206°N 2.6809894°W

Longville To Stanway Road Section is a Site of Special Scientific Interest (SSSI) within the Shropshire Hills National Landscape. It is located 2km east of Rushbury, near Wilderhope Manor and 5km southwest of Wenlock Edge SSSI in Shropshire, England. This area is protected because of its Silurian geology where the sediments contain fossils of animals that lived in the shallow seas present 420 million years ago.

== Geology ==
Longville To Stanway Road Section has an exposure where the Wenlock Limestone stratum from the Silurian period is immediately above the Farley Member stratum. The Farley Member stratum is from the Coalbrookdale Formation. Fossils in these strata include bryozoa and trilobites such as Calymene tuberculosa (genus Calymene). Fossils also include graptolites including the species Monograptus ludensis (genus Monograptus) and Pristiograptus jaegeri.

== Land ownership ==
Most of the land in Longville To Stanway Road Section SSSI is owned by the National Trust.
