= Listed buildings in Hinstock =

Hinstock is a civil parish in Shropshire, England. It contains eight listed buildings that are recorded in the National Heritage List for England. All the listed buildings are designated at Grade II, the lowest of the three grades, which is applied to "buildings of national importance and special interest". The parish contains the village of Hinstock and the surrounding countryside. The listed buildings consist of a church, a memorial in the churchyard, a farmhouse, a house with a pump and basin, two milestones, and a folly.

== Buildings ==
Name and location	Photograph	Date	Notes
Hoarlake Farmhouse; 52.84518°N 2.43766°W	—	Late 17th century	The farmhouse was refronted in the 20th century. It is timber framed with infill in wattle and daub and red brick, on a red sandstone plinth, the refronting is in pebbledashed brick, and the roof is tiled. The house has one storey and an attic, two bays, and a one-storey lean-to on the left. There is a canted bay window, the other windows are casements, and there are two hip roofed eaves dormers. On the front is a gabled pebbledashed porch.
St Oswald's Church; 52.83375°N 2.45508°W		1719–20	The tower was added in about 1800, and the aisle and porch in about 1850. The church is in red sandstone with tiled roofs, and consists of a nave and a chancel in one cell, a south aisle, a west porch and a west tower. The tower has three stages, a clock face on the west side, a coped parapet, and a weathervane. The windows have round heads.
3 School Bank; 52.83667°N 2.45710°W	—	Late 18th century	The cottage is timber framed with brick nogging on a sandstone plinth and has a tile roof. There is one storey and an attic, two bays, and later rear wings. In the centre is a gabled porch, the windows are casements, and there are two gabled eaves dormers.
Milestone near the Four Crosses Inn; 52.84580°N 2.47094°W	—	Late 18th century	The milestone is on the west side of the A41 road, and was altered in the early 19th century. It is in red sandstone with cast iron plates, and has a triangular section on a square base. The plates have segmental heads and are inscribed with the distances in miles to Chester and to Newport, and on the base is a rectangular plate.
Milestone near Holly House; 52.83484°N 2.45574°W		Late 18th century	The milestone is on the west side of the A529 road, and was altered in the early 19th century. It is in red sandstone with cast iron plates, and has a triangular section on a square base. The plates have segmental heads and are inscribed with the distances in miles to Chester and to Newport, and on the base is a rectangular plate inscribed "HINSTOCK".
Hunt memorial 52.83392°N 2.45512°W	—	1826	The memorial is in the churchyard of St Oswald's Church, and is to the memory of Elizabeth Hunt. It is a pedestal tomb in red sandstone, and is in Classical style. The tomb has a chamfered plinth, corner piers with reeded ornament and flaming torches, and a top with a triangular pediment.
Castle folly 52.84422°N 2.46744°W	—	c. 1840	The folly is in sandstone, and consists of a miniature castle with a keep, bailey walls, and outer retaining walls. The keep has one storey and a basement, a string course and a parapet, and contains windows with pointed arches.
Pump and basin 52.83673°N 2.45713°W	—	Mid to late 19th century	The pump and basin are to the north of No. 3 School Bank. The pump is in cast iron and has a circular shaft with splayed spout, a fluted top with double-curved handle, and a fluted domed cap with a spike finial. The basin is circular and in sandstone.
