= Bryn Amlwg Castle =

Former castle near Anchor, Shropshire, England

- Anchor, Shropshire
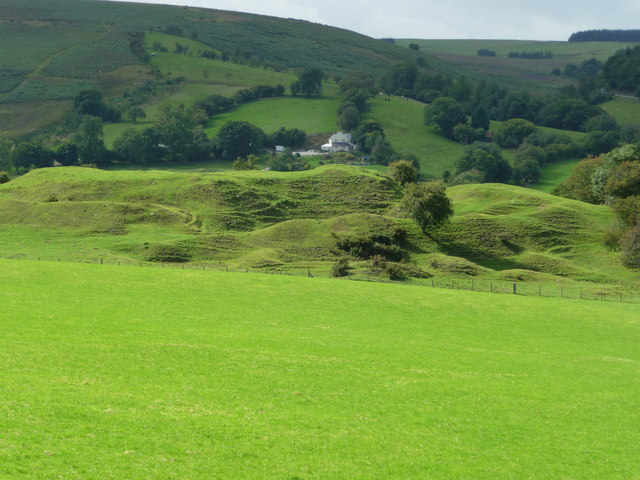
- Earthworks of Bryn Amlwyg Castle

Site information
- Type: Enclosure castle
- Condition: Earthworks remain

Location
- Shown within Shropshire
- Coordinates: 52.4521°N 3.2272°W
- Grid reference: grid reference SO167845

Bryn Amlwg Castle (Welsh: Castell Bryn Amlwg, lit. 'castle on a prominent hill') was an enclosure castle near Anchor, Shropshire, abutting the England–Wales border. It is a scheduled monument, listed in 1930.

This was an enclosure castle of the 12th and 13th centuries, and had towers and a gatehouse. Only earthworks now remain. In 1963 the site was excavated by archaeologists, determining that much of the original ringwork wall structure was composed of wood, and was later replaced largely with stone. The castle's adjacency to the England–Wales border and the former stone fortification shows its historical strategic significance as a border fortification. Its builder is unknown, but its resemblance to Dolforwyn Castle may suggest that Llywelyn ap Gruffudd erected the castle, perhaps in the late 1260s. Archaeological evidence of burning suggests the castle fell or was slighted during the Anglo-Welsh war of 1276-77.

The tripoint of Shropshire, Montgomeryshire and Radnorshire is very close by, located at the confluence of the Nant Rhydyfedw and the Nant Rhuddwr valley.

== See also ==
- Castles in Great Britain and Ireland
- List of castles in England
