= Stanner Rocks =

Coordinates: 52°13′16″N 3°04′45″W

Stanner Rocks is a rounded hill, steep in parts, which lies close to the Wales border with England between Walton and Kington. A superb collection of wild plants can be found here. Where it faces south, warm sunshine and drying winds create an ideal environment for plants which are more likely to be seen around the Mediterranean. The most famous of Stanner Rocks’ specialties is the pretty and elusive Radnor lily, having small, starry yellow flowers.

The Stanner–Hanter complex is the set of rocks which outcrop at Stanner Hill and the nearby Hanter Hill and Worsel Wood and which have long been considered to be the oldest in Wales, having been dated to around 700 million years BP using the rubidium-strontium dating method. They comprise gabbro, diorite and granite. Little modern research has been undertaken on the Complex. The rocks have been variously described as a hypersthene trap (Murchison 1867); an Archean ridge (Calloway1879); a Carboniferous laccolith (Raw 1904); a Tertiary igneous complex (Watts 1906); and a Carboniferous intrusion (Pocock & Whitehead 1935).

Holgate & Knight-Hallowes (1941) suggested a Precambrian origin based on the occurrence of dolerite clasts associated with Longmyndian sediments in a nearby quarry. Much of the confusion must relate to the fault-bounded nature of the Complex which gives no direct stratigraphic control of its age of formation. In the late 1970s the general acceptance of the theory of plate tectonics resulted in a re-investigation of the Precambrian and Paleozoic igneous rocks of southern Britain. Thorpe et al. (1984) made the earliest developments by identifying the calc-alkaline nature of many of these exposures and interpreting this evidence as the product of Precambrian subduction. The Stanner - Hanter Complex was not part of this study, perhaps because of its considerable alteration or possibly owing to the limited range of rock types. In 1980 the publication of a Rb/Sr isotopic age of 702 ± 4 Ma by Pachett et al. confirmed the Neoproterozoic age of the Complex whilst establishing it as the oldest dated rock sequence in southern Britain. More extensive dating of Avalonian rocks both in southern Britain and Maritime Canada has allowed Avalonian subduction to be refined into several stages. Gibbons & Hõrak (1996) grouped the Stanner-Hanter Complex with the Malverns Complex placing both within Avalonian Event 1, the early arc-construction phase, which has been dated at 677Ma. Implicit in this interpretation, however, is the assumption that the Stanner-Hanter rocks have a calc-alkaline composition. Slightly older dolerites and gabbros in the Avalonian of Newfoundland have a more primitive oceanic affinity related to the rifting and formation of primitive oceanic crust.
