= Anchor, Shropshire =

Hamlet in Shropshire, England

Coordinates: 52.457°N 3.215°W

Anchor
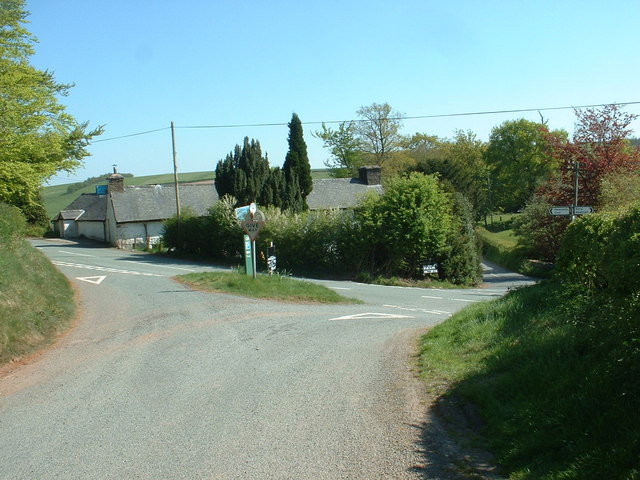
- Crossroads in Anchor

- Location within Shropshire
- OS grid reference: SO175851
- Civil parish: Bettws-y-Crwyn
- Unitary authority: Shropshire
- Ceremonial county: Shropshire
- Region: West Midlands
- Country: England
- Sovereign state: United Kingdom
- Post town: CRAVEN ARMS
- Postcode district: SY7
- Dialling code: 01686
- Police: West Mercia
- Fire: Shropshire
- Ambulance: West Midlands
- UK Parliament: South Shropshire

Anchor is a remote hamlet in southwest Shropshire, England. The hamlet is the most westerly place in Shropshire.

== Geography ==
Anchor lies only 400 yards away from the border with Wales. The B4368 road runs through the hamlet on its way between the towns of Clun (in England) to Newtown (in Wales). The road reaches an elevation of 1,276 feet (389 m; 425 yd; 0.2417 mi; 15,310 in; 38,900 cm; 0.389 km; 389,000 mm; 4.11×10^{−14} ly), making it the highest classified road in Shropshire. The point at which the B4368 crosses over the Nant Rhuddwr (a small watercourse that runs along this part of the English-Welsh border; also known as the Rhuddwr Brook in English) into Wales is known as Anchor Bridge. Anchor is also the most westerly settlement in England on the English-Welsh border, with the most westerly point of the border being approximately 1 1/2 miles (2.4 km) to the southwest. The tripoint of Shropshire, Montgomeryshire and Radnorshire is near this most westerly point, located at the confluence of the Nant Rhydyfedw and the Nant Rhuddwr.

Anchor is on the western fringes of the Clun Forest and to the north and northwest lies the forestry plantation of Ceri Forest. The River Clun, which flows towards Newcastle-on-Clun and on to the River Teme near Leintwardine, has its source just south of the hamlet, between Anchor and Bettws Hill Wood, in the marshy area near the pub. The hamlet lies at a saddle point, at the head of the Clun valley on one side and also alongside the Rhuddwr valley on the other side.

Anchor lies in the parish of Bettws-y-Crwyn and the Shropshire Council electoral division of Clun.

== Demographics ==
Two new houses were constructed in the early 2010s near the Anchor Inn, increasing the size of the settlement somewhat.

== Features and attractions ==
At the main crossroads was the "Anchor" public house at 1,266 feet (386 m), the highest pub in Shropshire following the closure of The Kremlin at Clee Hill Village. It had been a pub continuously since at least 1830, until the last landlord retired in 2020, and features in the Mary Webb novel Seven for a Secret (1922) as the "Mermaid's Rest". The Anchor had an entry in both the CAMRA Good Beer Guide 2015 and 2016.

The local economy is mainly agricultural, with sheep and other livestock farms. There are a number of small, disused quarries in the area.

The Anchor Show is held annually in August, just over the border in Wales by the Kerry Ridgeway, and is primarily a horse, pony and dog show.

Static caravans, camping and stabling for horses are available at The Anchorage, just to the south of the Anchor pub.

Nearby, to the southwest, is Bryn Amlwg Castle, the remains of an ancient castle.
