= Huglith Mine =

Protected area in Shropshire, England

Coordinates: 52°36′33″N 2°52′55″W

Huglith Mine is a Site of Special Scientific Interest (SSSI) in Shropshire, England. It is located 4km west of Dorrington or 3km southeast of Minsterley. It is protected because of the geology exposed in this disused mine (the mine opened in the 19th century and closed in 1945). When the mine was active, it was a major producer of barium and this protected area still has an exceptional deposit of barite.

== Geology ==
Huglith Mine has one of the best exposures of barite mineralisation in England. The exposure of barite is situated within the Longmyndian Supergroup of Precambrian age.

== Land ownership ==
Part of the land within the Huglith Mine SSSI is owned by the Forestry Commission. This protected area is included within the Eastridge and Shelve Forest Plan made by the Forestry Commission.
