= Radnor Wood =

Coordinates: 52.431°N 3.022°W

Radnor Wood is a small forest east of Clun, Shropshire, in England. It covers an area of 1.5 km^{2} (0.58 sq mi).

It is located on top of a hill which reaches 326 metres (1,070 ft) above sea level. This point is one of the highest areas in the valley formed by the River Clun. The hill is mainly limestone and this abundance of limestone was discovered by the Romans. Early quarries have been found on the top of the hill and two recent disused quarries can be found at the base of the hill.

Once part of one vast forest (the Clun Forest), Radnor Wood is considered small in comparison to the nearby woods such as Hoar Wood and Withins Wood.

The wood can be accessed via the B4368 which passes through Clun and to the south of the forest.
