= The Wrekin =

Hill in Shropshire, England

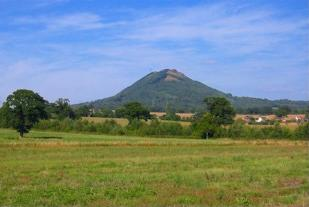

Highest point
- Elevation: 407 m (1,335 ft)
- Prominence: 298 m (978 ft)
- Parent peak: Kinder Scout
- Listing: Marilyn
- Coordinates: 52°40′09″N 2°33′05″W

Geography
- Location: Shropshire, England
- Parent range: Shropshire Hills
- OS grid: SJ628080
- Topo map: OS Landranger 127

The Wrekin (/ˈriːkɪn/ REE-kin) is a hill in east Shropshire, England. It is located some three miles (4.8 km) southwest of Wellington, on the border between the unitary authorities of Shropshire and Telford and Wrekin. Rising above the Shropshire Plain to a height of 407 metres (1,335 ft) above sea level, it is a prominent and well-known landmark, signalling the entrance to Shropshire for travellers westbound on the M54 motorway. The Wrekin is contained within the northern salient of the Shropshire Hills AONB. The hill is popular with walkers and tourists and offers good views of Shropshire. It can be seen well into Staffordshire and the Black Country, and even as far as the Beetham Tower in Manchester, Winter Hill in Lancashire and Cleeve Hill in Gloucestershire.

== Name ==
The earliest mention of the Wrekin occurs in a charter of 855, as entered in a late 11th-century Worcester cartulary, spelled Wreocensetun. Its modern form is believed to have come into modern English by way of Mercian, and that is likely to have been taken from the British Celtic Wrikon-. Dinlle Wrecon, meaning the fort of Wrecon, appears as a place name in the early Welsh poems known as Canu Heledd.

== Summit ==
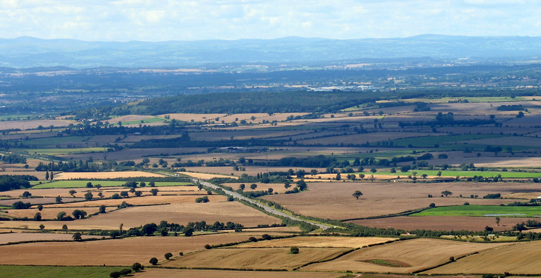
The A5 dual carriageway near Wellington viewed from the northern side of the Wrekin. The heavily forested Haughmond Hill is located behind it.

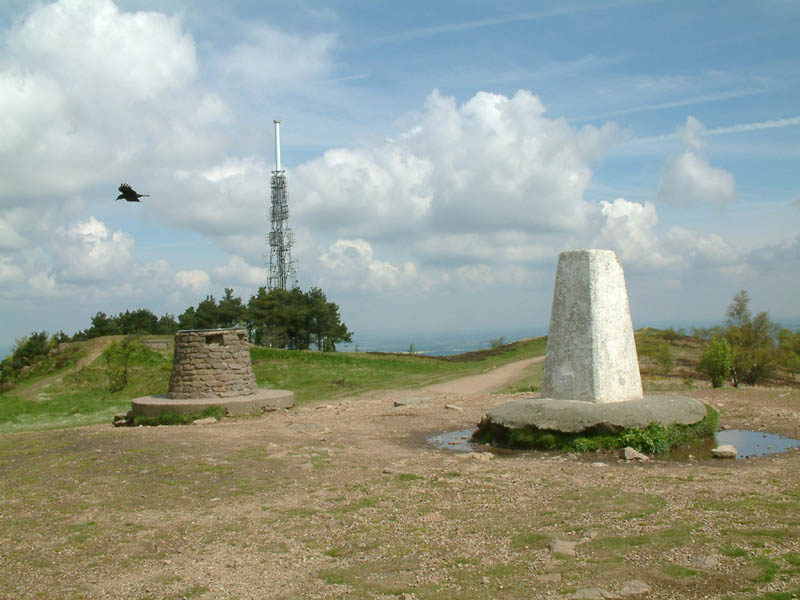
The summit of the Wrekin with its trig point, toposcope (viewfinder) and radio tower

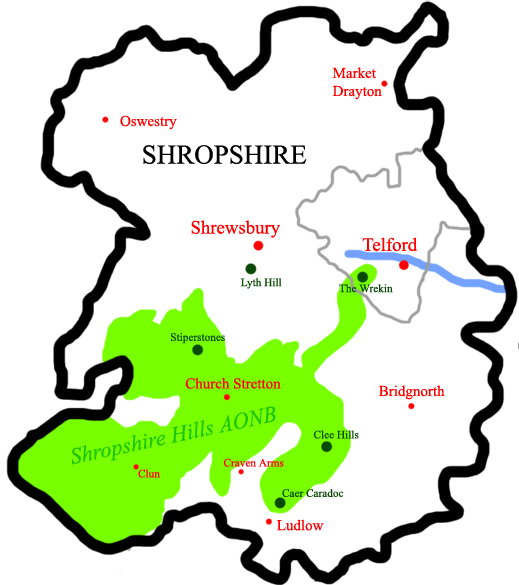
The Wrekin shown in relation to other geographical features in Shropshire

There is an Iron Age hill fort on the summit almost 8 ha (20 acres) in size, to which the name Uriconio originally referred. It is thought the fort was built by the Cornovii tribe and was once their capital. In AD 47 Roman invaders stormed the fort and set fire to it, moving the defeated tribe on to Wroxeter (Viroconium Cornoviorum).

A more recent addition is the Wrekin transmitting station, used for broadcasting and telecommunications. At the top of the main mast is a beacon which emits a red pulse of light every few seconds at night. A beacon was originally erected on the Wrekin during the Second World War to warn aircraft, and was kept in operation until 1960. A new beacon was then installed in 2000, as part of a project to celebrate the new millennium. It is known locally as the "Wrekin Beacon", and is visible for many miles around.

The trig point and toposcope at the height of the summit was incorporated into an artwork, The Sky Begins at My Feet, which was designed by Wellington Arts Collective and unveiled in October 2022 in honour of the Platinum Jubilee of Elizabeth II. The sculpture is in the stoneware clay tiles laid around the plinths bearing relief portraits of seven local heroes and heroines by artist Sharon Griffin, and a range of decorative tiles designed by the public and various community groups and workshops.

== Geology ==
The geology of the Wrekin and its immediate area is complex, consisting of a variety of rocks of a range of ages affected by numerous faults. The crest of the Wrekin's ridge and its northwestern slopes are formed from various rocks of volcanic origin assigned to the Uriconian series, of Precambrian age. The 'Uriconian Volcanics' include rhyolites, tuffs and agglomerates. These rocks – layers of ancient lava flows laid down in a volcanic island arc, similar to modern Japan – are approximately 680 million years old.

Dolerite dykes intruded the extrusive volcanic rocks around 563 million years ago. A variety of the intrusive igneous rock granophyre, known as Ercallite forms the northeastern shoulder of the Ercall. It was put in place around 560 million years ago and is overlain by Cambrian rocks of sedimentary origin. The southeastern side of the ridge is largely formed from sandstones and shales of Cambrian age. They include the early Cambrian Lower Comley Sandstone and Lower Comley Limestones together with the Wrekin Quartzite, outcrops of which also occur to the northwest of the ridge.

The lower ground to the northwest comprises sandstones and mudstones of late Carboniferous and Permian age whilst to the southeast are a succession of rocks of early Carboniferous age including limestone, the Little Wenlock Basalt and the Lydebrook Sandstone.

Structurally, the Wrekin together with the Ercall forms part of the Church Stretton Complex where different geological terranes meet. The Cymru terrane is to the west with the Wrekin terrane to the east of the fault system. The fault system trends north-northeast:south-southwest and the line carries on through other geologically important exposures such as those in the area of Caer Caradoc.

Contrary to a common misconception, the Wrekin has never been a volcano in its own right, but is composed mainly of volcanic rocks and is a product of volcanism. Its modern shape, which from certain viewpoints appears to resemble a volcano, has been formed by other natural processes.

== Wider area ==
The name the Wrekin is also used to refer more generally to the part of East Shropshire around the towns of Telford and Wellington, within sight of the hill. The surrounding area is one of the birthplaces of industry: Ironbridge Gorge is just to the south of the Wrekin hill. Woodland covers much of the hill, the area around the hill and into the Ironbridge Gorge area too. The eponymous Wrekin parliamentary constituency incorporates the hill.

== Access ==
The Wrekin can be accessed from the final junction on the M54 motorway (J7) before it turns into the A5 which continues to Shrewsbury. The hill is then signposted. There is a well-used footpath up the side of the hill which has an entrance at the end of the road off the M54. There is also a small car park and parking bays up the road. Between the Ercall and the Wrekin is a well positioned car park, at Forest Glen, allowing easy access to both areas. The ascent is steep in parts. The Wrekin is owned by the Raby Estate, currently headed by Lord Barnard.

== Folklore and local custom ==
The Wrekin is the subject of a well-known legend in Shropshire folklore. One version of the story runs as follows:

A giant called Gwendol Wrekin ap Shenkin ap Mynyddmawr with a long-standing grudge against the town of Shrewsbury decided to flood the town and kill all its inhabitants. So he collected a giant-sized spadeful of earth and set off towards the town. Unfortunately, the giant did not have a good sense of direction. When in the vicinity of Wellington, the exhausted giant met a cobbler returning from Shrewsbury market with a large sackful of shoes for repair. The giant asked him for directions, adding that he was going to dump his spadeful of earth in the River Severn and flood the town. "It's a very long way to Shrewsbury," replied the quick-thinking shoemaker. "Look at all these shoes I've worn out walking back from there!" The giant immediately decided to abandon his enterprise and dumped the earth on the ground beside him, where it became the Wrekin. The giant also scraped the mud off his boots, which became the smaller hill Ercall Hill nearby. Ironically Shrewsbury is subjected to flooding from the River Severn on frequent occasions naturally.

"All around the Wrekin", "Right 'round the Wrekin" or "Running round the Wrekin" is a phrase common in Shropshire, Worcestershire, Staffordshire, Herefordshire, the Black Country, Birmingham to mean "the long way round", in the same way that "round the houses" is used more widely. "To all friends around the Wrekin", meanwhile, is a toast traditionally used in Shropshire, especially at Christmas and New Year.

The amount of inclement weather in the area can also be said to be predicted by the visibility of the Wrekin. The saying being, "If you can see the Wrekin, it's going to rain. And if you can't see the Wrekin, it's already raining."

Another well known local legend has it that you cannot be a true Salopian (person born in Shropshire) unless you have passed through the Needle's Eye – a split between two large rocks close to the summit.

In 1981, an event was undertaken by local school pupils and adults called "Hands around the Wrekin", whereby a large group of people all held hands, surrounding the hill at the base.

The Wrekin has a cheese named after it called Wrekin White, which is produced and sold in a dairy in Newport, Shropshire.

In September 2010, Wiccans conducted a wicker man burning ceremony at the Wrekin to celebrate the autumnal equinox.

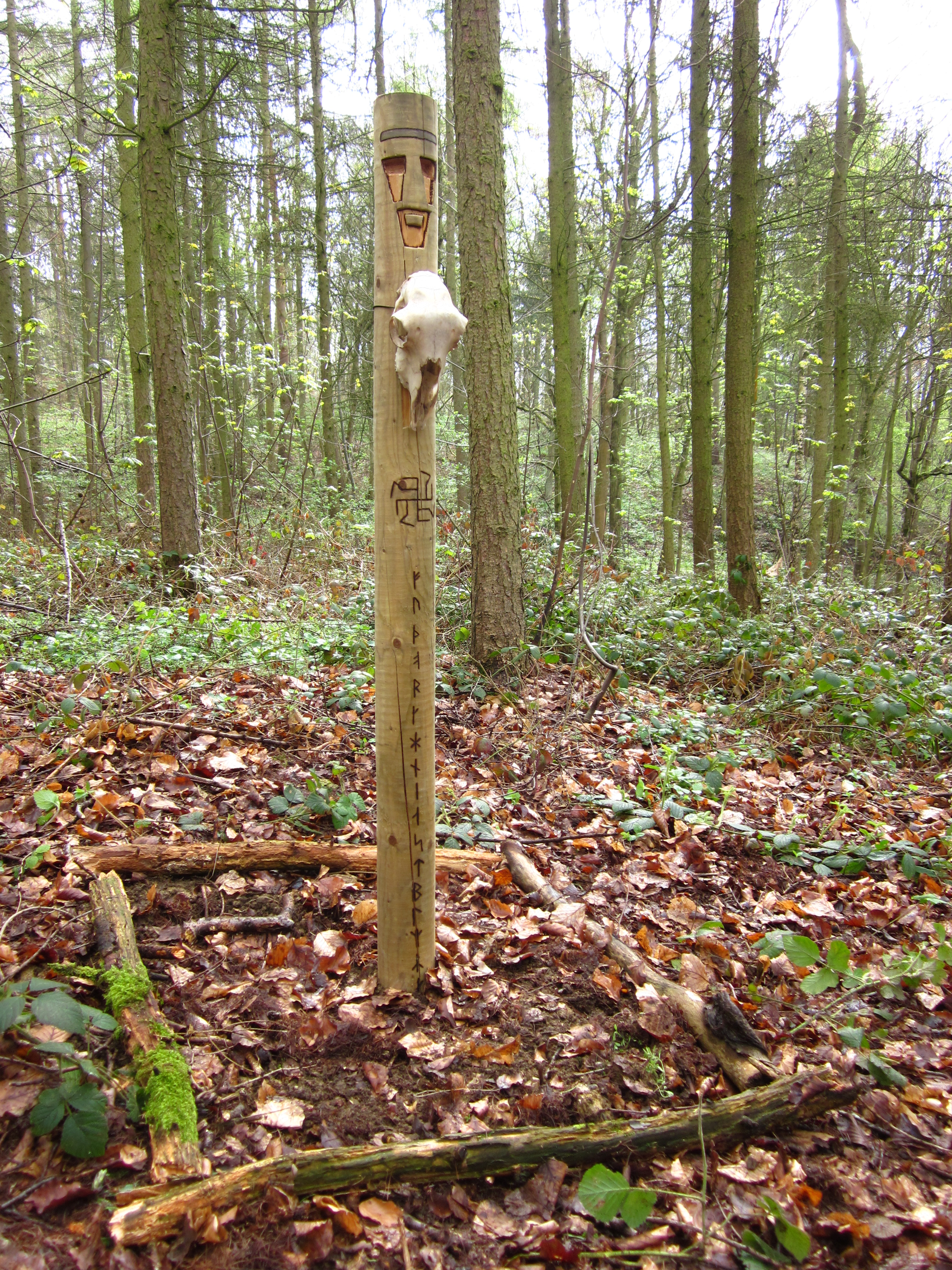
Wooden godhead idol at Eallhālig Temple, a holy area for local Wiccans

== In popular culture ==
The Wrekin is mentioned in Poem XXXI of A.E. Housman's collection A Shropshire Lad. The first stanza runs:

On Wenlock Edge the wood's in trouble;
His forest fleece the Wrekin heaves;
The gale, it plies the saplings double,
And thick on Severn snow the leaves.

In the 1969 novel A Pelican at Blandings, The Wrekin can be seen from P.G. Wodehouse's Blandings Castle.

The Wrekin is also mentioned in Half Man Half Biscuit's 1987 song, "Rod Hull Is Alive, Why?", with the line: "Halfway up the Wrekin with an empty flask of tea, a fog descends and takes away my visibility..." In Edward Lear's A Book of Nonsense, one of the limericks starts:

There was an Old Man of the Wrekin
Whose shoes made a horrible creaking

In 2017, during an attempt by the high-street chain Poundland to challenge the trademark of Mondelēz's Toblerone bar with their own Twin Peaks confectionery, they claimed that the latter was inspired by the shape of the Wrekin, which is situated in the region of Poundland's head office in Willenhall. The chocolate bar was launched that year, and is said to be based on the Wrekin and Ercall hills. Poundland's founder, Steve Smith, lives near Bridgnorth in Shropshire.

The Wrekin is a location in the 2020 videogame Assassin's Creed Valhalla, as "The Wroeken".

Christian Bale (playing racing driver Ken Miles, from Sutton Coldfield) uses the phrase "It’s just a quick ride round The Wrekin" in 2019 film "Le Mans '66".

== Views ==
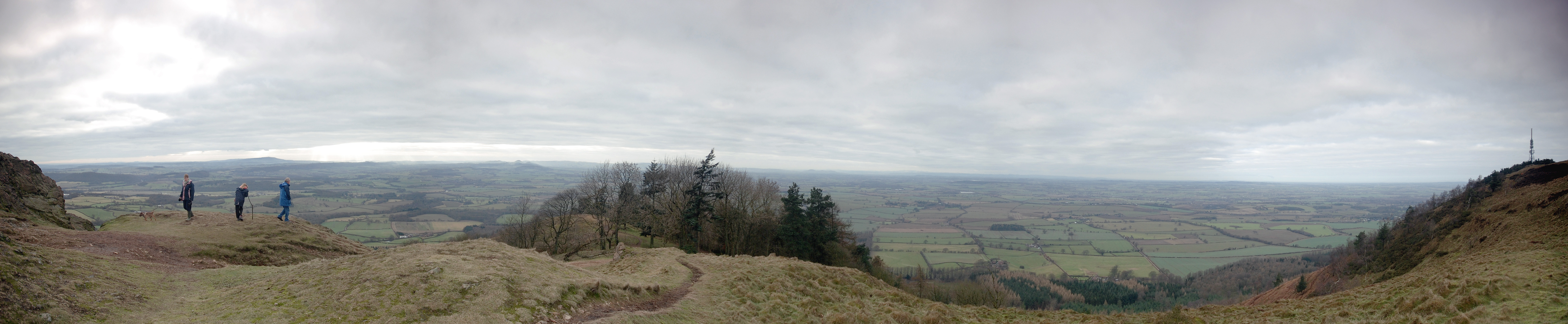
View to the west from the top of the Wrekin
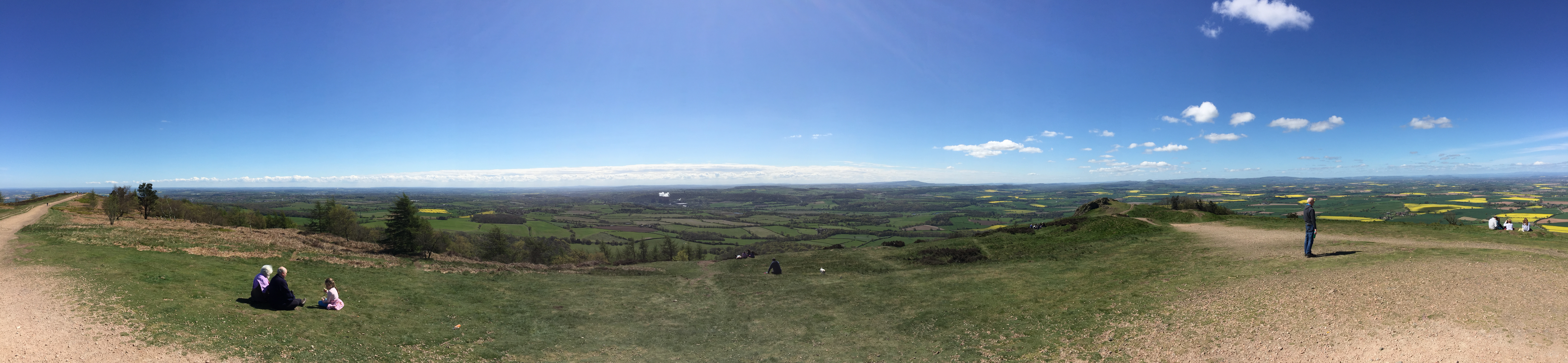
South East facing panoramic view from The Wrekin at the summit

The most distant visible point is probably the Forest of Bowland in north-east Lancashire. Despite historical claims, including a toposcope at the summit, it is not possible to see Snowdon from the Wrekin, as the line of sight is blocked by Cadair Berwyn.

The following principal peaks are visible on the horizon in perfect conditions (distances in miles):

- N-NE: Winter Hill (66), Hail Storm Hill (70), Freeholds Top (73), Blackstone Edge (71), Black Chew Head (64), Mow Cop (34), Sponds Hill (49), Shining Tor (47), Axe Edge Moor (46), The Roaches (42), Merryton Low (42), Ipstones Edge (37)
- NE-E: Weaver Hills (38), Alport Height (50), Cannock Chase (24), Bardon Hill (52)
- E-SE: Barr Beacon (28), Turners Hill (24), Walton Hill (26)
- SE-S: Ebrington Hill (54), Broadway Tower (54), Bredon Hill (47), Cleeve Hill (57), Leckhampton Hill (59), Abberley Hill (27), Worcestershire Beacon (40)
- S-SW: Titterstone Clee Hill (19), Brown Clee Hill (14), Ysgyryd Fawr (59), Blorenge (64), High Vinnalls (24), Waun Fach (55), Mynydd Troed (57), Waun Rydd (65), Pen y Fan (66), Colva Hill (43), Great Rhos (39)
- SW-W: Hope Bowdler Hill (13), Ragleth Hill (15), Caer Caradoc (12), Long Mynd (16), Heath Mynd (20), Stiperstones (17), Plynlimon (54), Long Mountain (23)
- W-NW: Cadair Idris (57), Maesglase (51), Glasgwm (50), Aran Fawddwy (48), Foel Cedig (42), Moel Sych (38), Cadair Berwyn (38), Cadair Bronwen (38), Moel Fferna (37), Vivod Mountain (35), Moel y Gamelin (37), Cyrn y Brain (36)
- NW-N: Moel Famau (45), Hope Mountain (37), Raw Head (30), Fair Snape Fell (86)
