= Brown Moss =

Protected area in Shropshire, England

Coordinates: 52.950°N 2.654°W

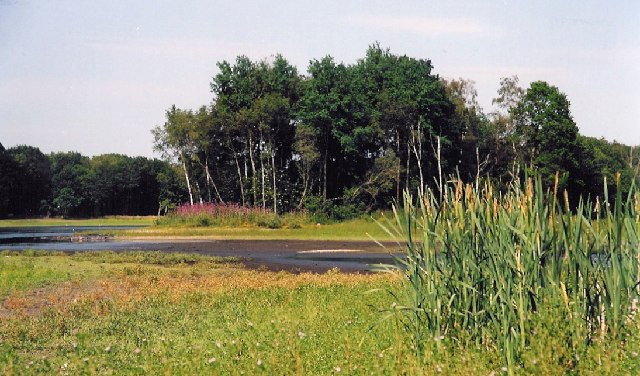
Brown Moss Nature Reserve photo: Charles Leventon, geograph.org.uk

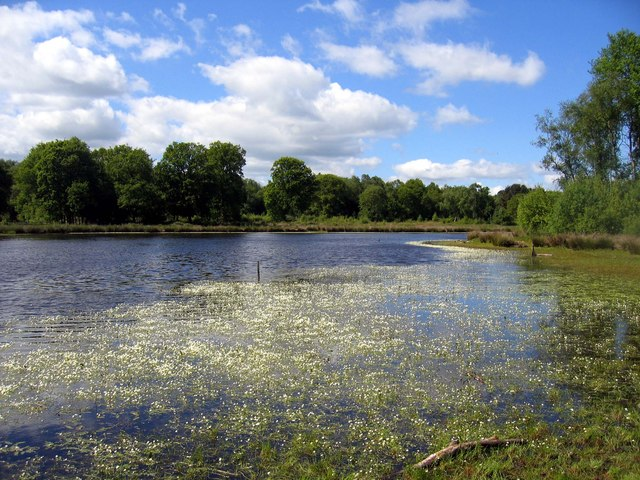
The wetland is an important habitat for wildlife and rare plants photo: Brian Norman, geograph.org.uk

Brown Moss is a Site of Special Scientific Interest, Local Nature Reserve and important wetland area rich in wildlife close to Whitchurch, Shropshire. It is open to visitors and contains a number of self-guided walking trails. The name 'moss' derives from the local word for a peat bog.

== Location, history and importance ==
Located within 2 miles (3 km) of Whitchurch and to the east of the A41, Brown Moss covers an area of 31 hectares (77 acres). It is thought that the area was used for peat cutting by the people of Whitchurch from the Middle Ages and it was considered to be an area of common land. Shropshire County Council bought the site in 1952 to maintain access for residents as a recreation site.

Brown Moss became a Local Nature Reserve and countryside site in 2000. It is also a Site of Special Scientific Interest, a Special Area of Conservation and a Ramsar site – meaning it is wetland of international importance.

=== Site characteristics and wildlife ===
The site is made up of marshes, pools, heathland and woodland habitats that support more than 200 species of rare plants such as floating water plantain. Wildlife recorded at the site includes common and great crested newt, great spotted woodpeckers and jays. There are 30 species of breeding birds at the site and many visitors, including wetland birds, such as Canada goose, mallard and great crested grebe. During the summer, froglets and dragonflies are found around water and woodland edges.

=== Geology and peat creation ===
Brown Moss is a flat site that was created at the end of the last ice age, over 10,000 years ago. As glaciers retreated, pools were formed by the stranded ice rocks, forming kettle holes Peat is still being created and Sphagnum moss – which is very important for the creation of peat – is found in abundance.

== Access and walking routes ==
This site contains a number of circular walks (including a family-friendly walk), but the area is often boggy so suitable footwear is recommended.

The site is now threatened by a non-native invasive plant Crassula helmsii (New Zealand Pygmy Weed), which smothers other plants due to its fast growth rate. To limit the spread and protect the marsh habitats, visitors are asked to walk on designated paths and stay away from pool edges.

=== Habitat management ===
The current habitat management regime involves removing scrub and young trees. Without this intervention, the area would transform into a dense scrubland losing the pools, and marshes that contribute to its importance as a wildlife site. Shropshire Council is looking to introduce grazing as a way to manage the site.

== External sources ==
- Council application for fence (public document explaining importance of grazing to maintain habitat)
- Habitat Management Plan
- Fence application
- Family friendly walk
