= Granville Country Park =

Nature reserve in Shropshire, England

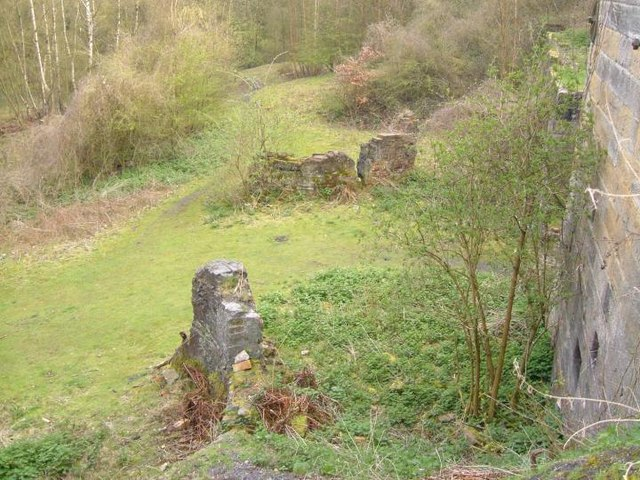
- Lodge Furnace remains

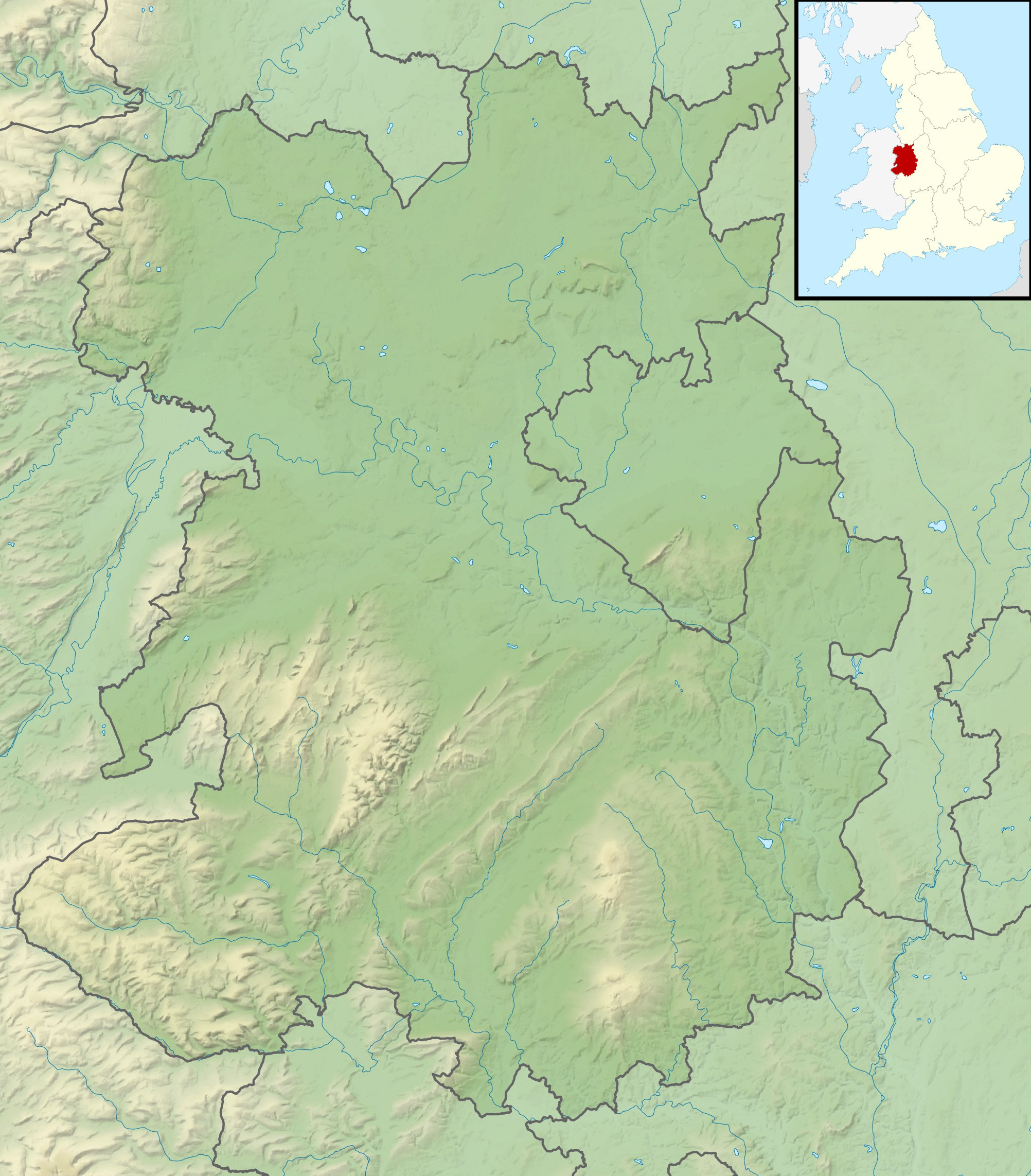
- Location within Shropshire
- Location: near Telford, Shropshire
- OS grid: SJ 715 128
- Coordinates: 52°42′43″N 2°25′24″W
- Area: 24 hectares (59 acres)
- Operator: Telford and Wrekin Council; Shropshire Wildlife Trust; Friends of Granville
- Designation: Local nature reserve
- Website: www.telford.gov.uk/info/20629/local_nature_reserves/3866/granville_country_park

Granville Country Park is a local nature reserve near Telford in Shropshire, England. It is owned by Telford and Wrekin Council, who work in partnership with the Shropshire Wildlife Trust and Friends of Granville.

== Description ==
The reserve, area 24 hectares (59 acres), contains former industrial sites, since reclaimed by nature. There is woodland, meadows, a marsh and open water; former pit mounds are now grasslands and heath. These varied habitats support many species of plant, bird and insect.

=== Muxton Marsh ===
Muxton Marsh, within the reserve, is designated a Site of Special Scientific Interest. Its area is 7.3 hectares (18 acres). The western end is an uncultivated meadow, with plant species including yellow rattle, meadow vetchling and marsh thistle. The eastern end is wetter, a habitat for rushes, sedges and marsh arrow-grass. The eastern part includes the slopes of a former pit mound, where there is now woodland with alder and willow at its foot by the marsh.

=== Remains of industry ===
The remains of blast furnaces, a tub boat canal and a winding engine house can be seen.

The blast furnaces were the Old Lodge Furnaces, built by the Lilleshall Company, near an old hunting lodge that was demolished in 1820. They were in use from 1824 until 1888; they were demolished in 1905. Part of the brickwork of three of the furnaces remain.
