= Heath Mynd =

Coordinates: 52.53978°N 2.98193°W

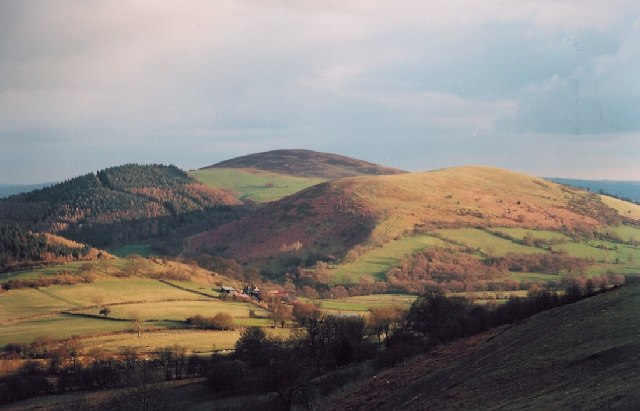
- Heath Mynd and Cefn Gunthly, looking south from Mucklewick Hill

Highest point
- Elevation: 452 m (1,483 ft)
- Prominence: 190 m (620 ft)
- Parent peak: Corndon Hill
- Listing: Marilyn

Geography
- Location: Shropshire Hills, England
- OS grid: SO335940
- Topo map: OS Landranger 137

Heath Mynd is a hill in the English county of Shropshire. At a height of 452 metres (1,483 ft) it is fairly unnotable except for its Marilyn status, a feature caused by the sharp drop on all sides. It is connected to Corndon Hill by a low col, and is only just inside England, being just one mile from the border with Wales. The nearby village is Norbury; nearest towns are Bishop's Castle and Church Stretton. Its nearest neighbour (visible in the photo) is called Cefn Gunthly.
