= Welsh Borderland fault system =

Fault zone in Great Britain

The Welsh Borderland fault system is a zone of faulting and associated folding which runs northeastwards through Wales from Pembrokeshire through Carmarthenshire and Powys into Shropshire in England. It comprises the Tywi Lineament, Pontesford Lineament and Church Stretton fault zone. The southern margin of the fault system is defined by the Church Stretton Fault and Dulas Valley Fault, amongst others whilst its northern margin is defined by the Garth-Llanwrtyd Fault Belt in Carmarthenshire. The Church Stretton Fault component of the system is deemed to form the terrane boundary between the Cymru terrane to its northwest and the Wrekin terrane to its southeast.

The system was active during the Caledonian orogeny and was reactivated during the later Variscan orogeny. It is considered to define the southeastern margin of the Caledonian orogen within Britain, just as the Moine Thrust defines the opposing northwestern margin.
