= Haughmond Hill =

Hill in Shropshire, England

Coordinates: 52.71631°N 2.67944°W

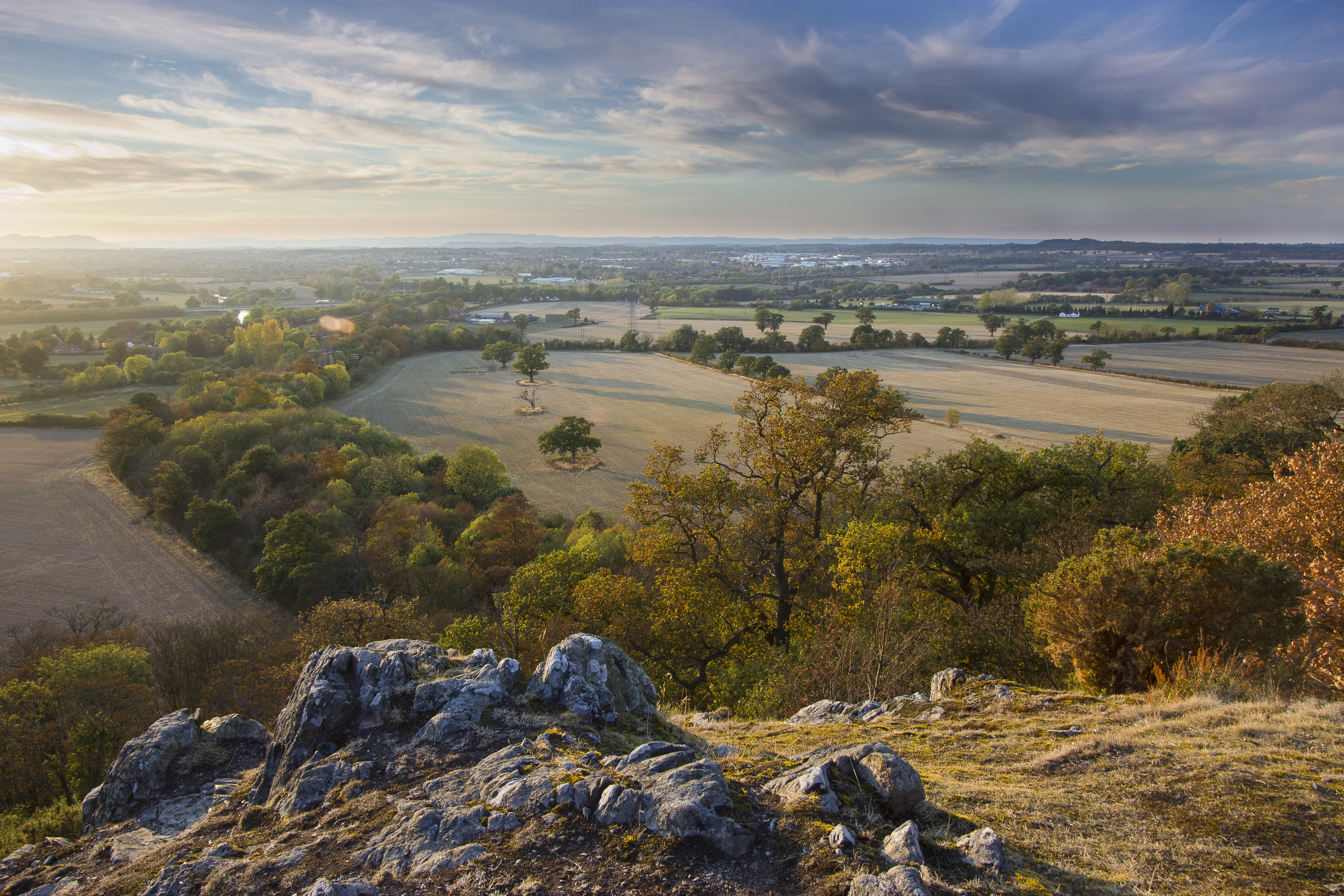
- A view from Haughmond Hill

Highest point
- Elevation: 153 m (502 ft)
- Prominence: c. 85 m

Geography
- Location: Shropshire, England
- OS grid: SJ542134
- Topo map: OS Landranger 126

Haughmond Hill is a small, shallow hill in the English county of Shropshire. It is covered by woodland for the most part, although there is an open cast quarry (for stone aggregates) in use. Its proximity to the town of Shrewsbury has meant that it has become something of a forest park, with guided paths, car parking and picnic areas maintained in places. The rocky summit overlooks countryside and Shrewsbury itself.

Haughmond Hill is made up of ancient turbidite sediments from the late Precambrian era which once cascaded off the edge of a continent into the ocean that surrounded it.

The villages of Uffington and Upton Magna lie below and the B5062, Shrewsbury to Newport, road runs through the northern half of the woodland.

Deer can be found in the woods, which are mixed deciduous/coniferous and are to some extent used for forestry to this day.

The hill has several dubious connections with the Battle of Shrewsbury in 1403. Queen Eleanor's Bower is a small enclosure on the hill from which the wife of Henry IV of England supposedly watched the battle's progress (although neither of his wives were named Eleanor). Finally, the "bosky hill" mentioned in Act V Scene i of Shakespeare's Henry IV part 1 is almost certainly Haughmond, which looms to the east of the battlefield:

How bloodily the sun begins to peer
Above yon bosky hill?
The day looks pale
At his distemperature.

Also nearby is Haughmond Abbey, now a ruin, and Ebury Hill, a prehistoric fort. The summit has the ruins of Haughmond Castle, a folly originally built about 1780 that collapsed in 1931.

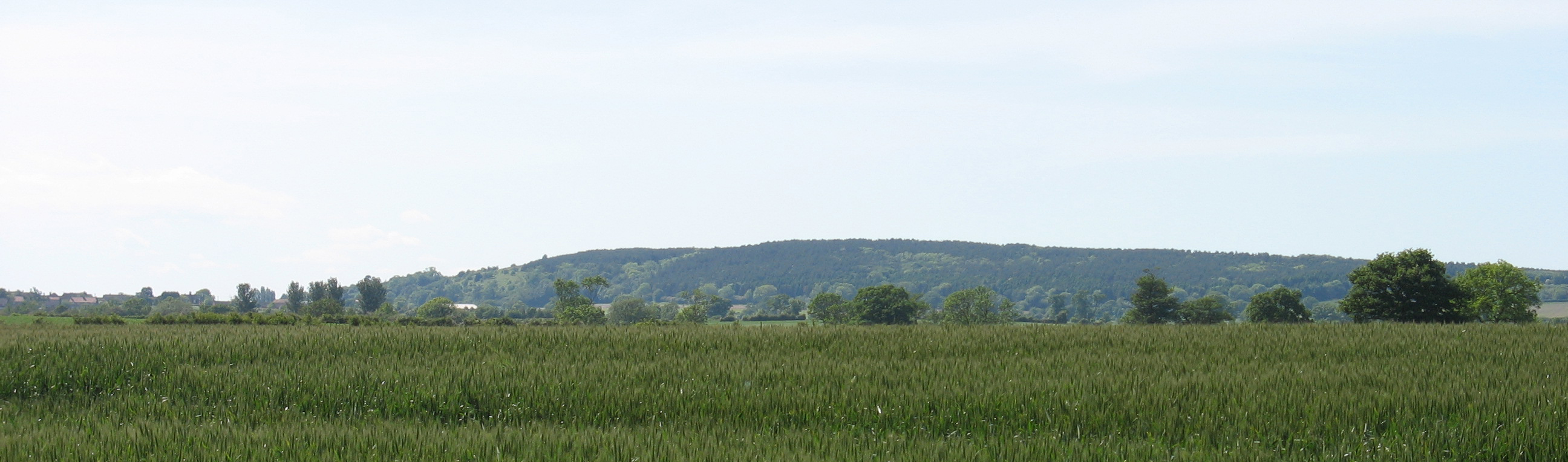
Haughmond Hill from the east. The view from this angle helps to illustrate the broad flatness of the hill.

== See also ==
- Haughmond F.C. - local football team named after the hill
