= Clun Forest =

Rural area in England and Wales

Coordinates: 52°28′N 3°08′W

Clun Forest (Welsh: Coedwig Colunwy) is a remote, rural area of open pastures, moorland and mixed deciduous/coniferous woodland in the southwest part of the English county of Shropshire and also just over the border into Powys, Wales.

It was once a Royal hunting forest covering an area that stretched from Ludlow up the Clun Valley. Set aside for hunting in mediaeval times, these areas were not necessarily heavily wooded, though in today's landscape there are numerous small woods, such as Radnor Wood, together with larger areas of conifer plantations established by the Forestry Commission along the Wales–England border north of Anchor for example (the planted Ceri Forest), and to the north and southeast of Clun.

The ancient Offa's Dyke runs north–south through the area (and can be walked by the Offa's Dyke Path).

It gives its name to a deanery of the Church of England's Diocese of Hereford.

== Geology ==
The Forest is underlain by a succession of mudstones, sandstones and siltstones of Silurian age. Originally flat-lying these strata have been folded into two structural basins both centred on the Clun valley; one to the east, and one to the west of Newcastle. Accordingly, more or less all of the local rock strata dip inwards to these two points, at angles generally between 10 and 30 degrees. The two basins are separated by an anticline which runs north–south through Newcastle along what is referred to as the Clun Forest Disturbance. The central areas of both basins are characterised by the mudstones and sandstones of the Clun Forest Formation, a unit of latest Silurian (Pridoli) age. beneath this and forming a roughly concentric outcrop are the calcareous siltstones of the Cefn Einion Formation. Beyond these are the broadly similar rocks of the Knucklas Formation. Both units show evidence of bioturbation of the originally soft sediments. Beneath these are the sandstone/siltstone couplets of the Bailey Hill Formation. They show internal slumping and disruption of the original bedding in parts. It is this formation which defines the northern edge of Clun Forest. This sequence is cut through by multiple faults largely on north–south and NE-SW alignments.

Patches of glacial till originating in the last ice age (Devensian) are common in many of the valleys. Around Clun itself is a substantial morainic deposit. Landslips have occurred in places, notably that beneath Caer-din Ring. The floor of the Clun valley is formed from alluvium whilst there is evidence of three river terraces.

== A Shropshire Lad ==
A. E. Housman wrote as part of his series of poems A Shropshire Lad:

   "In valleys of springs of rivers      
      By Ony and Teme and Clun,          
   The country for easy livers,          
      The quietest under the sun...

   'Tis a long way further than Knighton,
      A quieter place than Clun,         
   Where doomsday may thunder and lighten
      And little 'twill matter to one."

== See also ==
- Shropshire Hills AONB
- Clun
- Newcastle
