= The Ercall =

Hill in Shropshire, England

Coordinates: 52.68291°N 2.52952°W

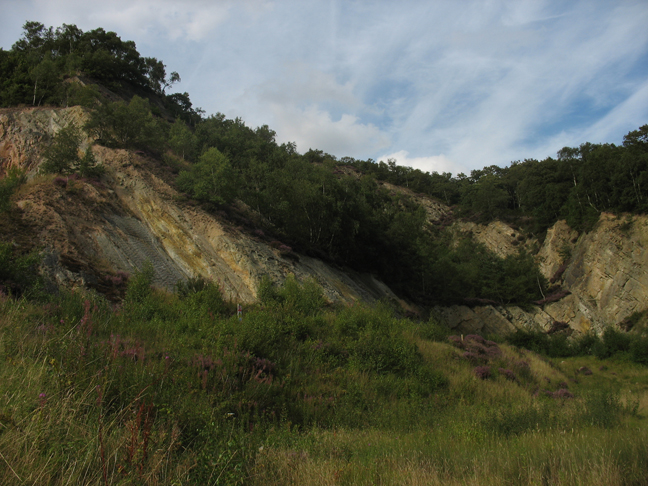
- The Ercall's quarries viewed from the south.

Highest point
- Elevation: 140 m (460 ft)(approx.)

Geography
- Location: Shropshire, England
- Parent range: Shropshire Hills
- OS grid: SJ643096

The Ercall is a small hill in Shropshire, England, between The Wrekin and Wellington. It is an internationally important geological site, part of The Wrekin and The Ercall Site of Special Scientific Interest (SSSI). The hill is managed by Shropshire Wildlife Trust and includes 540 million year old ripple beds and ancient pre-Cambrian lava flows in exposed quarries. Quartzite from the neighbouring Wrekin is also visible. The Ercall bears the marks of extensive quarrying, although the quarries are now disused, safe and open to the public. When the M54 motorway was constructed in 1974, the road was built through the northern end of the hill.

== Flora and fauna ==
The woods of the forest are important for various butterfly species. In the summer, the Ercall Woods which line the hill are a favourite habitat for the speckled wood and during spring when the forest is laden with bluebells, the dingy skipper can arrive in great numbers. The exposed quarries are popular with other butterfly species, including the green hairstreak and wall, which like to bask in sheltered spots.

On the upper slopes of the hill tall oak trees predominate. Acidic soils support such plants as bilberry, climbing corydalis and heath bedstraw. The green woodpecker is also present in the woods.

== Access ==
The hill is accessed in much the same way as The Wrekin nearby; exit the M54 motorway at J7 (last exit) or the last junction of the A5 from Shrewsbury before it becomes the M54. From there The Wrekin is signposted; follow this road until you reach The Wrekin, then follow the sign for the Buckatree Hotel. There is a small car park across the road from this pub/hotel, and the entrance is clearly visible.

== Geology ==
The Ercall Quarries are a SSSI and therefore care needs to be exercised when investigating this area. Upon entering the quarry from the main entrance near The Wrekin one encounters an old quarry with many distinctive geological features evident.

Ercall Quarry

Geography
- Location: Shropshire, England
- Parent range: Shropshire Hills

This is the first quarry that is apparent in the Ercall, it comprises Uriconian Volcanic deposits of Precambrian age. Such volcanic deposits are noted to have been bimodal and potentially intraplate possibly induced by (and therefore close to a) subduction zone and possibly in an island arc setting. The flow banding and fine to medium grained appearance of the deposit suggests a fairly rapid cooling event and appears to have been deposited in a submerged environment. In all likelihood, during such events the depositional environment would fluctuate between submarine and subaerial as sea-floor levels will have fluctuated as well as eustatic sea-levels.

On the right had side of the picture (running vertical) a dark grey doleritic dyke is evident. The dyke trends at approximately 65 degrees. Dolerite is intrusive and is relative to basalt (extrusive). There is a significant alteration about the contact between the two rocks. The dolerite dyke was emplaced into the Uriconian Rhyolite. The rhyolitic rocks themselves are representative of explosive volcanic centres to the west of this site and beyond the Church Stretton lineament. There is a clear distinction between the tuffaceous rocks of the Uriconican Volcanics (dark brown/black/grey) and the intrusive granophyre which is pink. The relationship between the Ercall Granophyre and the Uriconian is also clearly evident as the Granophyre intrudes the Volcanic rocks and is therefore younger.

The Ercall Granophyre is overlain by shallow dipping Cambrian rocks (in relation to the steeply dipping Uriconian volcanics) which contain Atdabanian fossils. The Granophyre is dated at 560+/-1Ma and is thought to be related to the volcanic events in the area. The thermal expansion of the area is likely to have assisted the formation of a sedimentary basin in which such volcaniclastic sediments accrued and were later folded. This has given rise to the steeply dipping sequences exposed at places such as the Forest Glen car park. The folding event is thought to be contemporaneous with uplift and a date of 526+/-28Ma has been put forward for this.

== Twin Peaks chocolate bar ==
In 2017, the discount retailer Poundland launched a rival chocolate bar to the Toblerone, which is manufactured by Mondelēz. Poundland's bar, Twin Peaks, takes the design of its shape from The Ercall and Wrekin hills. Poundland is based in the West Midlands, and its founder, Steve Smith, lives near Bridgnorth in Shropshire.
