= List of United Kingdom locations: Bab-Bal =

The United Kingdom

This is part of the list of United Kingdom locations: a gazetteer of place names in the United Kingdom showing each place's locality and geographical coordinates.

== Bab ==
Location	Locality	Coordinates (links to map & photo sources)	OS grid reference
Babbacombe	Devon	50.47°N 03.52°W	SX9265
Babbington	Nottinghamshire	52.98°N 01.27°W	SK4943
Babbinswood	Shropshire	52.86°N 02.99°W	SJ3330
Babbs Green	Hertfordshire	51.82°N 00.01°E	TL3916
Babcary	Somerset	51.04°N 02.62°W	ST5628
Babel	Carmarthenshire	52.00°N 03.70°W	SN8335
Babel Green	Suffolk	52.10°N 00.52°E	TL7348
Babell	Flintshire	53.24°N 03.27°W	SJ1573
Babeny	Devon	50.55°N 03.87°W	SX6775
Babingley	Norfolk	52.81°N 00.48°E	TF6726
Babraham	Cambridgeshire	52.12°N 00.20°E	TL5150
Babworth	Nottinghamshire	53.31°N 00.98°W	SK6880

== Bac ==
Location	Locality	Coordinates (links to map & photo sources)	OS grid reference
Bac Beag	Argyll and Bute	56.44°N 06.48°W	NM239374
Bachau	Isle of Anglesey	53.32°N 04.35°W	SH4383
Bache	Shropshire	52.42°N 02.79°W	SO4681
Bacheldre	Powys	52.52°N 03.12°W	SO2492
Bachelor's Bump	East Sussex	50.87°N 00.61°E	TQ8412
Bache Mill	Shropshire	52.46°N 02.73°W	SO5086
Bach-y-gwreiddyn	Swansea	51.68°N 04.02°W	SN6000
Back	Western Isles	58.27°N 06.30°W	NB4840
Backaland	Orkney Islands	59.15°N 02.77°W	HY5630
Backbarrow	Cumbria	54.24°N 02.99°W	SD3584
Backbower	Tameside	53.43°N 02.07°W	SJ9593
Backburn	Aberdeenshire	57.39°N 02.78°W	NJ5334
Backe	Carmarthenshire	51.80°N 04.52°W	SN2615
Backford	Cheshire	53.23°N 02.91°W	SJ3971
Backford Cross	Cheshire	53.25°N 02.93°W	SJ3873
Backhill	Aberdeenshire	57.44°N 02.36°W	NJ7839
Backhill of Clackriach	Aberdeenshire	57.50°N 02.13°W	NJ9246
Backhill of Fortrie	Aberdeenshire	57.45°N 02.06°W	NJ9640
Backies	Highland	57.99°N 03.98°W	NC8302
Backlands	Moray	57.70°N 03.44°W	NJ1469
Backmuir of New Gilston	Fife	56.26°N 02.92°W	NO4308
Back o'th' Brook	Staffordshire	53.05°N 01.88°W	SK0851
Back Rogerton	East Ayrshire	55.47°N 04.29°W	NS5522
Back Street	Suffolk	52.19°N 00.54°E	TL7458
Backwell	North Somerset	51.40°N 02.74°W	ST4868
Backwell Common	North Somerset	51.41°N 02.74°W	ST4869
Backwell Green	North Somerset	51.41°N 02.73°W	ST4969
Backworth	North Tyneside	55.04°N 01.53°W	NZ3072
Bac Mòr	Argyll and Bute	56.45°N 06.47°W	NM244385
Bacon End	Essex	51.83°N 00.32°E	TL6018
Baconend Green	Essex	51.84°N 00.32°E	TL6019
Bacon's End	Solihull	52.48°N 01.75°W	SP1787
Baconsthorpe	Norfolk	52.88°N 01.15°E	TG1237
Bacton	Herefordshire	51.98°N 02.93°W	SO3632
Bacton	Norfolk	52.84°N 01.47°E	TG3433
Bacton	Suffolk	52.26°N 01.00°E	TM0567
Bacton Green	Norfolk	52.85°N 01.47°E	TG3434
Bacton Green	Suffolk	52.24°N 00.97°E	TM0365
Bacup	Lancashire	53.69°N 02.21°W	SD8622

== Bad ==
Location	Locality	Coordinates (links to map & photo sources)	OS grid reference
Badachonacher	Highland	57.72°N 04.20°W	NH6973
Badbury	Swindon	51.51°N 01.72°W	SU1980
Badbury Wick	Swindon	51.52°N 01.74°W	SU1881
Badby	Northamptonshire	52.21°N 01.18°W	SP5658
Badcall	Highland	58.44°N 05.01°W	NC2455
Badcaul	Highland	57.86°N 05.33°W	NH0291
Baddeley Edge	City of Stoke-on-Trent	53.04°N 02.13°W	SJ9150
Baddeley Green	City of Stoke-on-Trent	53.05°N 02.15°W	SJ9051
Baddesley Clinton	Warwickshire	52.34°N 01.70°W	SP2072
Baddesley Ensor	Warwickshire	52.57°N 01.60°W	SP2798
Baddidarach	Highland	58.14°N 05.26°W	NC0822
Baddow Park	Essex	51.69°N 00.48°E	TL7202
Badenscallie	Highland	58.00°N 05.33°W	NC0306
Badenscoth	Aberdeenshire	57.43°N 02.51°W	NJ6938
Badentoy Park	Aberdeenshire	57.06°N 02.16°W	NO9097
Badgall	Cornwall	50.64°N 04.50°W	SX2386
Badgeney	Cambridgeshire	52.54°N 00.09°E	TL4296
Badger	Shropshire	52.58°N 02.35°W	SO7699
Badger's Hill	Worcestershire	52.13°N 02.00°W	SP0048
Badgers Mount	Kent	51.33°N 00.13°E	TQ4962
Badger Street	Somerset	50.96°N 03.05°W	ST2619
Badgeworth	Gloucestershire	51.86°N 02.14°W	SO9019
Badgworth	Somerset	51.26°N 02.87°W	ST3952
Badharlick	Cornwall	50.64°N 04.46°W	SX2686
Badicaul	Highland	57.29°N 05.73°W	NG7529
Badlesmere	Kent	51.24°N 00.86°E	TR0053
Badley	Suffolk	52.17°N 01.02°E	TM066568
Badluarach	Highland	57.89°N 05.39°W	NG9994
Badminton	South Gloucestershire	51.53°N 02.28°W	ST8082
Badnaban	Highland	58.12°N 05.27°W	NC0720
Badnagie	Highland	58.26°N 03.45°W	ND1531
Badninish	Highland	57.91°N 04.09°W	NH7694
Badrallach	Highland	57.86°N 05.27°W	NH0691
Badsey	Worcestershire	52.08°N 01.89°W	SP0743
Badshalloch	West Dunbartonshire	56.05°N 04.49°W	NS4587
Badshot Lea	Surrey	51.22°N 00.76°W	SU8648
Badsworth	Wakefield	53.62°N 01.30°W	SE4614
Badwell Ash	Suffolk	52.28°N 00.91°E	TL9969
Badwell Green	Suffolk	52.28°N 00.94°E	TM0169
Badworthy	Devon	50.43°N 03.86°W	SX6861

== Bae-Bag ==
Location	Locality	Coordinates (links to map & photo sources)	OS grid reference
Bae Cinmel (Kinmel Bay)	Conwy	53.30°N 03.53°W	SH9880
Bae Colwyn (Colwyn Bay)	Conwy	53.28°N 03.71°W	SH8678
Bae-Penrhyn (Penrhyn Bay)	Conwy	53.31°N 03.77°W	SH8281
Baffins	City of Portsmouth	50.80°N 01.06°W	SU6601
Bagber	Dorset	50.91°N 02.35°W	ST7513
Bagby	North Yorkshire	54.21°N 01.29°W	SE4680
Bagby Grange	North Yorkshire	54.21°N 01.31°W	SE4580
Bag Enderby	Lincolnshire	53.22°N 00.01°E	TF3472
Bagendon	Gloucestershire	51.75°N 01.98°W	SP0106
Bagginswood	Shropshire	52.42°N 02.47°W	SO6881
Baggrow	Cumbria	54.75°N 03.29°W	NY1741
Baggy Point	Devon	51.14°N 04.25°W	SS426403
Bagham	Kent	51.23°N 00.96°E	TR0753
Bagh Mor	Western Isles	57.48°N 07.22°W	NF8756
Bagillt	Flintshire	53.26°N 03.17°W	SJ2275
Baginton	Warwickshire	52.36°N 01.50°W	SP3474
Baglan	Neath Port Talbot	51.61°N 03.80°W	SS7592
Bagley	Leeds	53.81°N 01.66°W	SE2235
Bagley	Somerset	51.20°N 02.78°W	ST4545
Bagley	Shropshire	52.83°N 02.89°W	SJ4027
Bagley Green	Somerset	50.96°N 03.25°W	ST1219
Bagley Marsh	Shropshire	52.84°N 02.90°W	SJ3928
Bagmore	Hampshire	51.19°N 01.05°W	SU6644
Bagnall	Staffordshire	53.04°N 02.12°W	SJ9250
Bagnor	Berkshire	51.41°N 01.35°W	SU4569
Bagpath (Kingscote)	Gloucestershire	51.64°N 02.29°W	ST8094
Bagpath (Rodborough)	Gloucestershire	51.71°N 02.21°W	SO8502
Bagshaw	Derbyshire	53.32°N 01.89°W	SK0781
Bagshot	Wiltshire	51.38°N 01.55°W	SU3165
Bagshot	Surrey	51.35°N 00.69°W	SU9163
Bagshot Heath	Surrey	51.34°N 00.69°W	SU9161
Bagslate Moor	Rochdale	53.61°N 02.21°W	SD8613
Bagstone	South Gloucestershire	51.58°N 02.46°W	ST6887
Bagthorpe	Nottinghamshire	53.05°N 01.30°W	SK4751
Bagthorpe	Norfolk	52.85°N 00.65°E	TF7932
Baguley	Manchester	53.39°N 02.28°W	SJ8189
Bagworth	Leicestershire	52.66°N 01.35°W	SK4408
Bagwyllydiart	Herefordshire	51.92°N 02.81°W	SO4426

== Bai ==
Location	Locality	Coordinates (links to map & photo sources)	OS grid reference
Bailanloan	Perth and Kinross	56.77°N 03.86°W	NN8666
Bailbrook	Bath and North East Somerset	51.40°N 02.34°W	ST7667
Baildon	Bradford	53.84°N 01.77°W	SE1539
Baildon Green	Bradford	53.83°N 01.78°W	SE1438
Baile Ailein	Western Isles	58.08°N 06.60°W	NB2920
Baile an Truiseil	Western Isles	58.38°N 06.50°W	NB3753
Baile Boidheach	Argyll and Bute	55.89°N 05.61°W	NR7473
Baile Gharbhaidh	Western Isles	57.38°N 07.39°W	NF7646
Baile Glas	Western Isles	57.49°N 07.27°W	NF8457
Baile Mhanaich	Western Isles	57.47°N 07.39°W	NF7755
Baile Mòr	Argyll and Bute	56.33°N 06.40°W	NM2824
Baile nan Cailleach	Western Isles	57.45°N 07.38°W	NF7753
Bailetonach	Highland	56.78°N 05.88°W	NM6373
Bailey Green	Hampshire	51.03°N 01.05°W	SU6627
Bailiff Bridge	Calderdale	53.71°N 01.78°W	SE1424
Bail' Iochdrach	Western Isles	57.50°N 07.32°W	NF8159
Baillieston	City of Glasgow	55.84°N 04.12°W	NS6763
Bailrigg	Lancashire	54.01°N 02.79°W	SD4858
Bail' Ùr Tholastaidh	Western Isles	58.35°N 06.22°W	NB5348
Bainbridge	North Yorkshire	54.30°N 02.10°W	SD9390
Bainsford	Falkirk	56.01°N 03.79°W	NS8882
Bainshole	Aberdeenshire	57.40°N 02.66°W	NJ6035
Bainton	Cambridgeshire	52.64°N 00.39°W	TF0906
Bainton	East Riding of Yorkshire	53.95°N 00.53°W	SE9652
Bainton	Oxfordshire	51.92°N 01.15°W	SP5826
Baintown	Fife	56.21°N 03.04°W	NO3503
Bairnkine	Scottish Borders	55.42°N 02.55°W	NT6515

== Bak ==
Location	Locality	Coordinates (links to map & photo sources)	OS grid reference
Baker's Cross	Kent	51.08°N 00.54°E	TQ7835
Bakers End	Hertfordshire	51.82°N 00.01°E	TL3916
Baker's Hill	Gloucestershire	51.79°N 02.61°W	SO5811
Baker Street	Essex	51.50°N 00.34°E	TQ6381
Baker's Wood	Buckinghamshire	51.57°N 00.52°W	TQ0287
Bakesdown	Cornwall	50.77°N 04.49°W	SS2400
Bakestone Moor	Derbyshire	53.27°N 01.22°W	SK5276
Bakewell	Derbyshire	53.20°N 01.68°W	SK2168

== Bal ==
Location	Locality	Coordinates (links to map & photo sources)	OS grid reference
Bala	Gwynedd	52.91°N 03.60°W	SH9236
Balance Hill	Staffordshire	52.88°N 01.88°W	SK0832
Balavil	Highland	57.09°N 03.99°W	NH7902
Balbeg	Highland	57.34°N 04.57°W	NH4531
Balbeggie	Perth and Kinross	56.44°N 03.36°W	NO1629
Balblair	Highland	57.47°N 04.50°W	NH5045
Balblair (Cromarty Firth)	Highland	57.66°N 04.18°W	NH7066
Balblair	Aberdeenshire	57.14°N 02.49°W	NJ7006
Balbuthie	Fife	56.20°N 02.80°W	NO5002
Balby	Doncaster	53.50°N 01.17°W	SE5501
Balcary Point	Dumfries and Galloway	54.82°N 03.83°W	NX820494
Balcathie	Angus	56.54°N 02.65°W	NO6039
Balchladich	Highland	58.21°N 05.35°W	NC0330
Balchraggan (The Aird)	Highland	57.45°N 04.45°W	NH5343
Balchraggan (Loch Ness)	Highland	57.37°N 04.39°W	NH5634
Balchrick	Highland	58.48°N 05.10°W	NC1959
Balcombe	West Sussex	51.05°N 00.13°W	TQ3130
Balcombe Lane	West Sussex	51.07°N 00.13°W	TQ3132
Balcurvie	Fife	56.18°N 03.06°W	NO3400
Baldersby	North Yorkshire	54.19°N 01.46°W	SE3578
Baldersby St James	North Yorkshire	54.17°N 01.44°W	SE3676
Balderstone	Lancashire	53.78°N 02.56°W	SD6332
Balderstone	Rochdale	53.59°N 02.15°W	SD9011
Balderton	Nottinghamshire	53.05°N 00.79°W	SK8151
Balderton	Cheshire	53.15°N 02.94°W	SJ3762
Baldhoon	Isle of Man	54.22°N 04.44°W	SC4184
Baldhu	Cornwall	50.23°N 05.12°W	SW7742
Baldingstone	Bury	53.62°N 02.30°W	SD8014
Baldinnie	Fife	56.28°N 02.93°W	NO4211
Baldock	Hertfordshire	51.98°N 00.19°W	TL2433
Baldon Row	Oxfordshire	51.69°N 01.19°W	SP5600
Baldovie	City of Dundee	56.48°N 02.89°W	NO4533
Baldrine	Isle of Man	54.20°N 04.42°W	SC4281
Baldslow	East Sussex	50.88°N 00.54°E	TQ7913
Baldwin	Isle of Man	54.19°N 04.53°W	SC3581
Baldwinholme	Cumbria	54.84°N 03.04°W	NY3351
Baldwin's Gate	Staffordshire	52.94°N 02.31°W	SJ7939
Baldwins Hill	West Sussex	51.13°N 00.02°W	TQ3839
Bale	Norfolk	52.88°N 00.98°E	TG0136
Balemartine	Argyll and Bute	56.46°N 06.90°W	NL9841
Balemore	Western Isles	57.57°N 07.47°W	NF7367
Balephetrish	Argyll and Bute	56.51°N 06.87°W	NM0046
Balephuil	Argyll and Bute	56.45°N 06.95°W	NL9540
Balerno	City of Edinburgh	55.88°N 03.34°W	NT1666
Baleromindubh Glac Mhòr	Argyll and Bute	56.04°N 06.20°W	NR3892
Baleshare	Western Isles	57.52°N 07.37°W	NF787614
Balevullin	Argyll and Bute	56.50°N 06.95°W	NL9546
Balfield	Angus	56.80°N 02.75°W	NO5468
Balfour	Orkney Islands	59.02°N 02.92°W	HY4716
Balfron	Stirling	56.06°N 04.34°W	NS5488
Balfron Station	Stirling	56.07°N 04.37°W	NS5289
Balgaveny	Aberdeenshire	57.44°N 02.58°W	NJ6540
Balgonar	Fife	56.12°N 03.57°W	NT0293
Balgowan	Highland	57.01°N 04.25°W	NN6394
Balgowan Point	Dumfries and Galloway	54.73°N 04.92°W	NX121418
Balgown (Trotternish)	Highland	57.62°N 06.39°W	NG3868
Balgown (Struan)	Highland	57.35°N 06.42°W	NG3438
Balgrochan	East Dunbartonshire	55.97°N 04.21°W	NS6278
Balgunearie	Highland	57.51°N 04.32°W	NH6149
Balgunloune	Highland	57.50°N 04.30°W	NH6248
Balhalgardy	Aberdeenshire	57.29°N 02.39°W	NJ7623
Balham	Wandsworth	51.44°N 00.15°W	TQ2873
Baliasta	Shetland Islands	60.76°N 00.90°W	HP6009
Baligrundle	Argyll and Bute	56.50°N 05.52°W	NM8340
Balimore	Argyll and Bute	55.90°N 05.68°W	NR7074
Balinoe	Argyll and Bute	56.47°N 06.92°W	NL9742
Balintore	Highland	57.75°N 03.91°W	NH8675
Balintore	Angus	56.71°N 03.17°W	NO2859
Balintraid	Highland	57.70°N 04.13°W	NH7370
Balkeerie	Angus	56.58°N 03.10°W	NO3244
Balk Field	Nottinghamshire	53.32°N 00.93°W	SK7181
Balkholme	East Riding of Yorkshire	53.73°N 00.81°W	SE7827
Balkiellie	Angus	56.67°N 02.49°W	NO7054
Ball	Cornwall	50.52°N 04.82°W	SX0073
Ball	Shropshire	52.82°N 03.04°W	SJ3026
Balla	Western Isles	57.07°N 07.31°W	NF7811
Ballabeg (Arbory)	Isle of Man	54.09°N 04.69°W	SC2470
Ballabeg (Lonan)	Isle of Man	54.20°N 04.42°W	SC4282
Ballacannell	Isle of Man	54.21°N 04.40°W	SC4382
Ballacarnane Beg	Isle of Man	54.25°N 04.61°W	SC3088
Ballachrink	Isle of Man	54.36°N 04.40°W	SC4499
Ballachulish	Highland	56.67°N 05.13°W	NN0858
Balladen	Lancashire	53.68°N 02.30°W	SD8021
Ballagawne	Isle of Man	54.08°N 04.73°W	SC2169
Ballajora	Isle of Man	54.28°N 04.35°W	SC4790
Ballaleigh	Isle of Man	54.26°N 04.59°W	SC3189
Ballamodha	Isle of Man	54.12°N 04.64°W	SC2773
Ballantrae	South Ayrshire	55.09°N 05.01°W	NX0882
Ballaragh	Isle of Man	54.23°N 04.38°W	SC4585
Ballard's Ash	Wiltshire	51.55°N 01.91°W	SU0684
Ballards Gore	Essex	51.59°N 00.74°E	TQ9092
Ballard's Green	Warwickshire	52.51°N 01.60°W	SP2791
Ballasalla	Isle of Man	54.09°N 04.63°W	SC2870
Ballater	Aberdeenshire	57.04°N 03.05°W	NO3695
Ballaterson	Isle of Man	54.30°N 04.33°W	SC4892
Ballaugh	Isle of Man	54.30°N 04.55°W	SC3493
Balleigh	Highland	57.82°N 04.19°W	NH7084
Ballelby	Isle of Man	54.16°N 04.72°W	SC2278
Ballencrieff	East Lothian	55.99°N 02.83°W	NT4878
Ballencrieff Toll	West Lothian	55.91°N 03.64°W	NS9770
Ballentoul	Perth and Kinross	56.76°N 03.83°W	NN8865
Ball Green	City of Stoke-on-Trent	53.06°N 02.16°W	SJ8952
Ball Haye Green	Staffordshire	53.11°N 02.03°W	SJ9857
Ballhill	Devon	50.98°N 04.48°W	SS2624
Ball Hill	Hampshire	51.36°N 01.39°W	SU4263
Ballidon	Derbyshire	53.08°N 01.70°W	SK2054
Ballifeary	Highland	57.46°N 04.23°W	NH6644
Ballimore (Loch Fyne)	Argyll and Bute	55.99°N 05.33°W	NR9283
Ballimore (Loch Tromlee)	Argyll and Bute	56.37°N 05.15°W	NN0525
Ballingdon	Suffolk	52.02°N 00.71°E	TL8640
Ballingdon Bottom	Hertfordshire	51.81°N 00.50°W	TL0314
Ballinger Bottom	Buckinghamshire	51.71°N 00.68°W	SP9103
Ballinger Bottom (South)	Buckinghamshire	51.70°N 00.68°W	SP9102
Ballinger Common	Buckinghamshire	51.71°N 00.68°W	SP9103
Ballingham	Herefordshire	51.97°N 02.62°W	SO5731
Ballingham Hill	Herefordshire	51.98°N 02.62°W	SO5732
Ballingry	Fife	56.15°N 03.33°W	NT1797
Ballinluig (SE of Pitlochry)	Perth and Kinross	56.64°N 03.68°W	NN9752
Ballinluig (Pitlochry)	Perth and Kinross	56.69°N 03.73°W	NN9457
Ballintuim	Perth and Kinross	56.66°N 03.47°W	NO1054
Balliveolan	Argyll and Bute	56.52°N 05.51°W	NM8442
Balloan	Highland	58.01°N 04.38°W	NC5905
Balloch	Highland	57.48°N 04.12°W	NH7346
Balloch	North Lanarkshire	55.94°N 04.03°W	NS7374
Balloch	West Dunbartonshire	56.00°N 04.58°W	NS3982
Ballochan	Aberdeenshire	56.99°N 02.79°W	NO5290
Ballochearn	Stirling	56.06°N 04.28°W	NS5888
Ballochgoy	Argyll and Bute	55.83°N 05.06°W	NS0864
Balloch Lane	South Ayrshire	55.21°N 04.47°W	NX428940
Ball o' Ditton	Cheshire	53.36°N 02.76°W	SJ4986
Ballogie	Aberdeenshire	57.04°N 02.71°W	NO5795
Balls Cross	West Sussex	51.02°N 00.60°W	SU9826
Balls Green	East Sussex	51.10°N 00.12°E	TQ4936
Balls Green	West Sussex	50.99°N 00.43°W	TQ1023
Balls Green	Essex	51.86°N 01.03°E	TM0923
Ball's Green	Gloucestershire	51.68°N 02.20°W	ST8699
Balls Hill	Sandwell	52.53°N 02.01°W	SO9993
Ballygown	Argyll and Bute	56.50°N 06.17°W	NM4343
Ballygrant	Argyll and Bute	55.81°N 06.16°W	NR3966
Ballymeanoch	Argyll and Bute	56.10°N 05.49°W	NR8396
Balmacara	Highland	57.28°N 05.63°W	NG8127
Balmacara Square	Highland	57.29°N 05.65°W	NG8028
Balmaclellan	Dumfries and Galloway	55.08°N 04.11°W	NX6579
Balmacneil	Perth and Kinross	56.63°N 03.68°W	NN9750
Balmacqueen	Highland	57.68°N 06.29°W	NG4474
Balmaha	Stirling	56.07°N 04.54°W	NS4290
Balmalcolm	Fife	56.26°N 03.09°W	NO3208
Balmalloch	North Lanarkshire	55.97°N 04.08°W	NS7078
Balmartin	Western Isles	57.62°N 07.49°W	NF7273
Balmashanner	Angus	56.63°N 02.88°W	NO4649
Balmeanach (Staffin, Skye)	Highland	57.63°N 06.25°W	NG4668
Balmeanach (Loch Caroy, Skye)	Highland	57.39°N 06.46°W	NG3243
Balmeanach (Loch Sligachan, Skye)	Highland	57.32°N 06.12°W	NG5234
Balmedie	Aberdeenshire	57.24°N 02.06°W	NJ9617
Balmer	Shropshire	52.90°N 02.83°W	SJ4434
Balmer Heath	Shropshire	52.90°N 02.83°W	SJ4434
Balmerino	Fife	56.40°N 03.05°W	NO3524
Balmerlawn	Hampshire	50.82°N 01.57°W	SU3003
Balmichael	North Ayrshire	55.52°N 05.29°W	NR9231
Balmoral (Galashiels)	Scottish Borders	55.61°N 02.82°W	NT4836
Balmore (Caithness)	Highland	58.58°N 03.72°W	ND0067
Balmore (Skye)	Highland	57.37°N 06.52°W	NG2841
Balmore	East Dunbartonshire	55.93°N 04.24°W	NS6073
Balmullo	Fife	56.36°N 02.94°W	NO4220
Balnabodach	Western Isles	56.98°N 07.41°W	NF7101
Balnaboth	Angus	56.78°N 03.13°W	NO3166
Balnabruach	Highland	57.83°N 03.85°W	NH9084
Balnabruich	Highland	58.24°N 03.44°W	ND1529
Balnacoil	Highland	58.07°N 04.03°W	NC8011
Balnacra	Highland	57.45°N 05.36°W	NG9846
Balnadelson	Highland	58.02°N 04.37°W	NC6006
Balnagask	City of Aberdeen	57.12°N 02.06°W	NJ9604
Balnaguard	Perth and Kinross	56.63°N 03.73°W	NN9451
Balnahard (Colonsay)	Argyll and Bute	56.11°N 06.16°W	NR4199
Balnahard (Mull)	Argyll and Bute	56.42°N 06.13°W	NM4534
Balnain	Highland	57.33°N 04.59°W	NH4430
Balnakeil	Highland	58.57°N 04.77°W	NC3968
Balnakeil Craft Village	Highland	58.56°N 04.76°W	NC3967
Balnakilly	Perth and Kinross	56.72°N 03.52°W	NO0760
Balnaknock	Highland	57.57°N 06.31°W	NG4262
Balnamoon	Aberdeenshire	57.58°N 02.18°W	NJ8955
Balnamoon	Angus	56.75°N 02.73°W	NO5563
Balnapaling	Highland	57.69°N 04.03°W	NH7969
Balne	North Yorkshire	53.66°N 01.12°W	SE5819
Balornock	City of Glasgow	55.88°N 04.20°W	NS6268
Balquhidder	Stirling	56.35°N 04.38°W	NN5320
Balranald	Western Isles	57.60°N 07.49°W	NF7270
Balsall	Solihull	52.38°N 01.66°W	SP2376
Balsall Common	Solihull	52.39°N 01.66°W	SP2377
Balsall Heath	Birmingham	52.45°N 01.89°W	SP0784
Balsall Street	Solihull	52.38°N 01.67°W	SP2276
Balscote	Oxfordshire	52.06°N 01.43°W	SP3941
Balsham	Cambridgeshire	52.12°N 00.30°E	TL5850
Balstonia	Essex	51.52°N 00.43°E	TQ6983
Balta	Shetland Islands	60.74°N 00.79°W	HP658075
Baltasound	Shetland Islands	60.75°N 00.86°W	HP6208
Balterley	Staffordshire	53.04°N 02.35°W	SJ7650
Balterley Green	Staffordshire	53.04°N 02.35°W	SJ7650
Balterley Heath	Cheshire	53.04°N 02.38°W	SJ7450
Balthangie	Aberdeenshire	57.54°N 02.28°W	NJ8351
Baltilly	Fife	56.28°N 02.98°W	NO3911
Baltonsborough	Somerset	51.10°N 02.65°W	ST5434
Balvenie	Moray	57.46°N 03.13°W	NJ3242
Balvicar	Argyll and Bute	56.28°N 05.62°W	NM7616
Balvraid	Highland	57.52°N 04.50°W	NH5051
Balwest	Cornwall	50.12°N 05.37°W	SW5930
