= List of places in Aberdeenshire =

List of settlements in Aberdeenshire council area

A list of towns and villages in the Aberdeenshire council area of Scotland.

== A ==
- Aberchirder
- Aboyne
- Aikenshill
- Alford
- Allanaquoich
- Aquithie
- Arbuthnott
- Ardiffery
- Ardmachron
- Ardonald
- Ardoyne
- Auchallater
- Auchattie
- Auchedly
- Auchenblae
- Auchlee
- Auchleven
- Auchlossan
- Auchmacoy
- Auchnagatt
- Auchnerran
- Auchterless
- Auldyoch

== B ==
- Backburn
- Backhill
- Badenscoth
- Badenyon
- Bainshole
- Balfour
- Ballater
- Ballogie
- Balmain
- Balmedie
- Banchory
- Banchory-Devenick
- Banff
- Barras
- Barthol Chapel
- Belhelvie
- Bellabeg
- Benholm
- Birse
- Birsemore
- Blackburn
- Blackdog
- Blair
- Boddam
- Bogbrae
- Bogniebrae
- Bograxie
- Bogton
- Bonnykelly
- Bonnyton
- Borrowfield
- Bowness
- Boyndie
- Braegarie
- Braehead
- Braemar
- Brathens
- Bressachoil farmstead
- Brideswell
- Bridge of Alford
- Bridge of Canny
- Bridge of Gairn
- Bridge of Muchalls
- Bridgend
- Broadsea
- Buchanhaven
- Bullers of Buchan
- Burn of Logie
- Burnfield

== C ==
- Cairnie
- Cairnleith Crofts
- Cairnorrie
- Cammachmore
- Catterline
- Chapelton
- Charlestown
- Clatt
- Clerkhill
- Cloak
- Clola
- Coalford
- Cock Bridge
- Collieston
- Colpy
- Cookney
- Corgarff
- Coriestane
- Cornhill
- Corriemulzie
- Cortes
- Cottown
- Cowie
- Craigdam
- Crathie
- Crawton
- Crimond
- Crovie
- Cruden Bay
- Cuminestown
- Cushnie

== D ==
- Daviot
- Dess
- Dinnet
- Downiehills
- Downies
- Drumblade
- Drumlithie
- Drumoak
- Drumtochty
- Dubford
- Dunbennan
- Dunecht
- Durno

== E ==
- Echt
- Edzell Woods
- Elliewell
- Ellon
- Elrick
- Eslie

== F ==
- Fawside
- Fermtoun of Upperton
- Fetterangus
- Fettercairn
- Findlater
- Findon
- Finzean
- Folla Rule
- Footie
- Forbes
- Fordoun
- Fordyce
- Forgue
- Fortie
- Fortree
- Forvie
- Foveran
- Fraserburgh
- Fyvie

== G ==
- Gardenstown
- Garlogie
- Garmond
- Gartly
- Garvock
- Gight
- Glenbervie
- Gordonstown
- Gourdon
- Grange

== H ==
- Harlaw
- Hatton
- Hatton of Fintray
- Huntly

== I ==
- Insch
- Inverallochy and Cairnbulg
- Inverbervie
- Inverey
- Inverkeithny
- Inverugie
- Inverurie
- Ironside

== J ==
- Johnshaven

== K ==
- Keig
- Kemnay
- Kennethmont
- Kildrummy
- Kincardine O'Neil
- King Edward
- Kingseat
- Kinmuck
- Kinneff
- Kintore
- Kirkton of Durris
- Kirkton of Tough
- Kirktown
- Kirktown of Fetteresso

== L ==
- Laurencekirk
- Lebano
- Lochton
- Logie Coldstone
- Longhaven
- Longmanhill
- Longside
- Lonmay
- Lost
- Ludquharn
- Lumphanan
- Lumsden
- Luthermuir

== M ==
- Macduff
- Mains Of Slains
- Mariewell
- Marnoch
- Maryculter
- Marykirk
- Marywell
- Maud
- Meikle Wartle
- Memsie
- Mergie
- Methlick
- Midmar
- Milton of Crathes
- Mintlaw
- Monymusk
- Mossat
- Muchalls

== N ==
- Nether Kinmundy
- Netherbrae
- Netherley
- New Aberdour
- New Byth
- New Deer
- New Leeds
- New Pitsligo
- Newburgh
- Newmachar
- Newtonhill

== O ==
- Old Deer
- Old Rayne
- Oldmeldrum
- Ordiquhill
- Oyne

== P ==
- Peathill
- Pennan
- Peterhead
- Pitcaple
- Pitmedden
- Pittodrie (village)
- Plaidy
- Port Erroll
- Portlethen
- Portlethen Village
- Portsoy
- Potarch
- Potterton

== R ==
- Rattray
- Relaquheim farmstead
- Rhynie
- Rora
- Rosehearty
- Rothienorman
- Ruthven
- Ryland

== S ==
- Sandend
- Sandhaven
- Sauchen
- St Combs
- St Cyrus
- St Fergus
- St John's Well
- Stirling Village
- Stonehaven
- Strachan
- Strathbogie
- Strathdon
- Strichen
- Stuartfield

== T ==
- Tarland
- Tarves
- Tewel
- The Colony
- Tifty
- Tillykerrie
- Tillylain
- Tillyorn
- Tornaveen
- Torphins
- Towie
- Tullich
- Tullynessle
- Turriff
- Tyrie

== U ==
- Udny Green
- Udny Station

== W ==
- Wartle
- Westburn
- Wester Beltie
- Westhill
- Whinnyfold
- Whitecairns
- Whitehills
- Whiterashes
- Woodfield
- Woodhead, Aberdeenshire

== Y ==
- Ythanbank
- Ythanwells
- Ythsie

== See also ==
- List of places in Scotland
