= List of places in Shropshire =

This is a list of towns and villages in the ceremonial county of Shropshire, England. This list includes those places in Telford and Wrekin. Those with town status are shown in bold.

== A ==
- Abbey Green, Abcott, Abdon, Ackleton, Acton Burnell, Acton Pigott, Acton Reynald, Acton Round, Acton Scott, Acton, Adderley, Adeney, Admaston, Alberbury, Albrighton, Bridgnorth, Albrighton, Shrewsbury and Atcham, Alcaston, Alderton, Aldon, Ale Oak, Alkington, All Stretton, Allscot, Alveley, Anchor, Angelbank, Annscroft, Apley Forge, Argoed, Arleston, Arscott, Ashfield, Ashfields, Ashford Bowdler, Ashford Carbonel, Ash Magna, Ash Parva, Asterley, Asterton, Astley Abbotts, Astley, Aston, Aston, Aston on Clun, Aston Botterell, Aston Eyre, Aston Pigott, Aston Rogers, Atcham, Atterley, Aqueduct, Alveston

== B ==
- Babbinswood, Bache Mill, Bache, Badger, Bagginswood, Bagley Marsh, Bagley, Balmer Heath, Bankshead, Barkers Green, Barnsley, Barrow, Baschurch, Battlefield, Bayston Hill, Beambridge, Bearstone, Beckbury, Beckjay, Bedlam, Bedstone, Benthall, Bentlawnt, Beobridge, Berrington, Betchcott, Betton, Betton Strange, Bettws-y-Crwyn, Bicton, Bicton, South Shropshire, Billingsley, Bings Heath, Birtley, Bishop's Castle, Bitterley, Bletchley, Bomere Heath, Boningale, Boraston, Boscobel, Botvyle, Bouldon, Bowbrook, Bradeley Green, Brandhill, Breaden Heath, Bridgnorth, Broadward, Brockton (Stanton Long), Brockton (Worthen), Bromfield, Brompton, Bronygarth, Broome, Broomfields, Broughall, Broseley, Brown Heath, Bucknell, Buildwas, Burcote, Burford, Burlton, Burwarton, Bushmoor, Buttonoak

== C ==
- Cabin, Calcott, Calverhall, Cantlop, Cardeston, Cardington, Castle Pulverbatch, Caynham, Cefn Einion, Chadwell, Chapel Lawn, Chelmarsh, Cheney Longville, Cherrington, Cheswardine, Cheswell, Chetton, Chetwynd, Child's Ercall, Chipnall, Chirbury, Church Aston, Church Preen, Church Pulverbatch, Church Stretton, Churchmoor, Claverley, Clee St. Margaret, Cleehill, Cleobury Mortimer, Cleobury North, Clive, **Clun**, Clunbury, Clungunford, Clunton, Coalbrookdale, Coalport, Cockshutt, Colebatch, Colemere, Comley, Condover, Coppicegate, Coreley, Corfton, Cosford, Coton, Coton Hill, Cound, Crackleybank, Craven Arms, Cressage, Cross Houses, Crossgreen, Cruckmeole, Cruckton, Crudgington, Culmington, Cwm Head, Crickheath

== D ==
- Dawley, Ditton Priors, Doddington, Donnington, Dorrington, Dorrington Lane, Donnington Wood, Dudleston Heath (Criftins), Dunnington

== E ==
- Eardington, Eaton, Eaton Constantine, Eaton-under-Heywood, Eaton Mascott, Eaton-upon-Tern, Edgmond, Edgton, Edstaston, Ellesmere, Enchmarsh, English Frankton, Ercall Magna

== F ==
- Farlow, Fauls Green, Felindre, Fitz, Ford, Foxholes

== G ==
- Gobowen, Grafton, Granville, Gravenhunger, Great Ness, Great Soudley, Grindley Brook, Grinshill, Gatacre

== H ==
- Habberley, Hadley, Hadnall, Halford, Hamperley, Halfway House, Hampton Loade, Hanwood, Harmer Hill, Haughmond Hill, Haughton (Morville), Haughton (Upton Magna), Haughton (Shifnal), Haughton (West Felton), Hawkstone, High Ercall, Higher Heath, Highley, Hinstock, Hinton, Hobarris, Hodnet, Holdgate, Hollinwood, Hollinswood, Homer, Hook-a-Gate, Hopesay, Hopton Castle, Hopton Wafers, Horsebridge, Horsehay, Hughley

== I ==
- Ightfield, Ireland's Cross, Ironbridge, Isombridge

== J ==
- Jackfield

== K ==
- Kenley, Ketley, Kinlet, Kinton, Kynnersley, Knighton, Knowbury, Knowle, Knockin, Kinnerley

NB: The town of Knighton is partly in Shropshire, partly in Powys.

== L ==
- Leamoor Common, Leaton, Leebotwood, Lee Brockhurst, Linley (near Barrow), Linley (near More), Little Brampton, Little Ness, Little Stretton, Little Wenlock, Lilleshall, Little Soudley, Llanfair Waterdine, Llanyblodwel, Llanymynech, Llynclys, Lockleywood, Longden, Longdon-on-Tern, Longford, Market Drayton, Longford, Newport, Long Waste, Loppington, Lowe, Lower Heath, Ludford, Ludlow, Lydbury North, Lydham, Lyneal

NB: The village of Llanymynech is partly in Shropshire, partly in Powys.

== M ==
- Madeley, Maesbrook, Maesbury, Mainstone, Market Drayton, Marshbrook, Marton, Melverley, Merrington, Middleton Baggot, Middleton Priors, Milson, Minsterley, Minton, Monkhopton, Montford, Montford Bridge, Morda, More, Moreton Corbet, Moreton Say, Much Wenlock, Myddle, Myndtown, Muckley, Muckley Cross Muxton

== N ==
- Neen Savage, Neen Sollars, Neenton, Nesscliffe, Newcastle, New Invention, Newport, Norbury, North Shropshire

== O ==
- Oakengates, Obley, Oldbury, Old Woods, Ollerton, Oreton, Osbaston, Oswestry, Osbaston, Telford, Oswestry, Overton

== P ==
- Pant, Patton, Pave Lane, Peaton, Peatonstrand, Pennerley, Pentreheyling, Picklescott, Pickstock, Pimhill, Plaish, Plowden, Plox Green, Pontesbury, Pontesford, Prees, Prees Green, Preston Gubbals, Priest Weston, Priors Holt, Priorslee, Pulverbatch, Purslow

== Q ==
- Quatford, Quatt, Quabbs, Quina Brook

== R ==
- Ratlinghope, *Richard's Castle, Rockhill, Roden, Rodington, Rodington Heath, Rorrington, Rosehill, Ruyton-XI-Towns

NB: The village of Richard's Castle is partly in Shropshire, partly in Herefordshire.

== S ==
- St Martin's, St George's, Sambrook, Selattyn, Shawbury, Shelderton, Shelve, Sheriffhales, Shifnal, Shrawardine, Shrewsbury, Sibdon Carwood, Skyborry, Smethcott, Snailbeach, Snedshill, South Shropshire, Sponsbury, Stanton Lacy, Stanton Long, Stanton upon Hine Heath, Steel Heath, Stiperstones, Stirchley, Stockton, Stokesay, Stoke Heath, Stoke St. Milborough, Stoke upon Tern, Stottesdon, Stretton Westwood

== T ==
- Telford, Ternhill, Tibberton, Ticklerton, Tilley, Tilstock, Tong, Treflach, Trefnant, Trefonen, Twitchen, Trench

== U ==
- Uckington, Uffington, Upper Affcot, Upper Battlefield, Uppington, Upton Magna

== V ==
- Vennington

== W ==
- Walcot, Walford, Waterloo, Wellington, Welshampton, Welsh Frankton, Wem, Wentnor, West Felton, Westbury, Weston Lullingfields, Weston Rhyn, Weston-under-Redcastle, Wettles, Wheathill, Whitchurch, Whitcot, Whitcott Keysett, Whittingslow, Whittington, Whixall, Willey, Winding River, Wistanstow, Wistanswick, Withington, Wixhill, Wollaston, Woofferton, Woolstaston, Woolston (near Oswestry), Woolston (near Church Stretton and Craven Arms), Woore, Worfield, Worthen, Wrentnall, Wrockwardine, Wrockwardine Wood, Wroxeter, Wyke, Wyken, Wykey

== Y ==
- Yeaton, Yockleton, Yorton

== See also ==
- Category:Towns in Shropshire
- Category:Villages in Shropshire
- List of civil parishes in Shropshire
- List of places in England
