= Bonnyton =

Bonnyton may refer to several places in Scotland:

- Bonnyton, Aberdeenshire
- Bonnyton, Angus, a small settlement in the parish of Auchterhouse
- Bonnyton, East Ayrshire, an area of Kilmarnock since 1871, previously a village
- Bonnyton, a part of the Barony of Bonshaw containing or adjacent to Girgenti House, East Ayrshire
- Bonnyton Moor by Eaglesham, East Renfrewshire, where the aircraft carrying Rudolf Hess crashed during World War II

== See also ==
- Bonnyton Thistle F.C.
