= Badwell =

Badwell may refer to the following places in Suffolk, England:

- Badwell Ash
- Badwell Green
