= Hollinwood =

Hollinwood may refer to two places in England:

- Hollinwood, Greater Manchester, an area of Oldham.
- Hollinwood, Shropshire, a village near Wales.
