= Bakers End =

Coordinates: 51.834°N 00.025°W

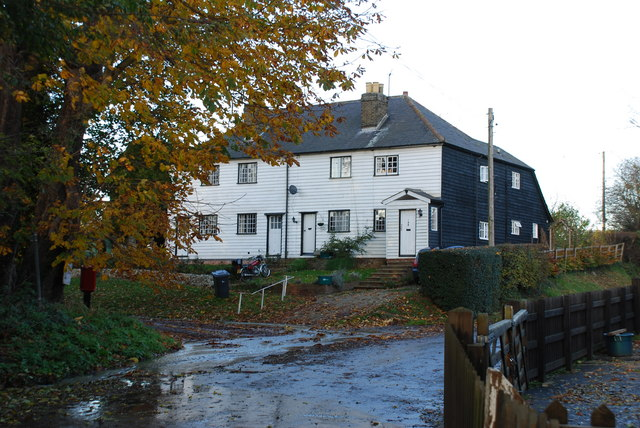
- Cottages at Bakers End

- Location within Hertfordshire
- OS grid reference: TL396170
- Civil parish: Wareside
- District: East Hertfordshire
- Shire county: Hertfordshire
- Region: East
- Country: England
- Sovereign state: United Kingdom
- Post town: Ware
- Postcode district: SG12
- Police: Hertfordshire
- Fire: Hertfordshire
- Ambulance: East of England

Bakers End (on some maps Baker's End) is a hamlet in the civil parish of Wareside, in the East Hertfordshire district of the county of Hertfordshire, England. The hamlet is on a minor road about half a mile north of Babbs Green and 3 miles (5 km) north-east of the town of Ware.
