= List of listed buildings in Glenbervie, Aberdeenshire =

This is a list of listed buildings in the parish of Glenbervie in Aberdeenshire, Scotland.

== List ==
Name	Location	Date listed	Geo-coordinates	Notes	Category	LB number	Image
"Melrose Cottage" School Road		November 25th, 1980	56°55′09″N 2°21′16″W		C(S)	9346	Upload Photo
Broombank Farmhouse		November 25th, 1980	56°54′49″N 2°21′34″W		C(S)	9310	Upload Photo
Glenbervie House		August 18th, 1972	56°54′50″N 2°22′59″W		B	9333	Upload Photo
Bridge Of Bervie Over Bervie Water		August 18th, 1972	56°54′49″N 2°23′36″W		B	9339	Upload Photo
"St John's Cottage", Kinmonth Road		November 25th, 1980	56°55′11″N 2°21′17″W		C(S)	9342	Upload Photo
"Joiner's House", Glenbervie Road		November 25th, 1980	56°55′07″N 2°21′10″W		C(S)	9308	Upload Photo
Mergie Farmhouse		August 18th, 1972	56°59′19″N 2°20′12″W		B	9312	Upload Photo
Glenbervie House - East Gates		August 18th, 1972	56°55′02″N 2°22′29″W		B	9337	Upload Photo
Glenbervie Mill		August 18th, 1972	56°54′52″N 2°23′22″W		B	9338	Upload Photo
Brawliemuir Farmhouse		November 25th, 1980	56°56′48″N 2°25′16″W		C(S)	9311	Upload Photo
Mergie - Garden House		November 25th, 1980	56°59′17″N 2°20′11″W		C(S)	9313	Upload Photo
Parish Kirk Manse, Now "Old Manse"		November 25, 1980	56°54′52″N 2°23′05″W		C(S)	9331	Upload Photo
Glenbervie House - Doocot		August 18th, 1972	56°54′59″N 2°22′52″W		B	9335	Upload Photo
Glenbervie House - West Gates		August 18th, 1972	56°55′00″N 2°22′54″W		B	9336	Upload Photo
Harlingtongue Farmhouse		November 25th, 1980	56°55′07″N 2°22′29″W		B	9340	Upload Photo
"The Old Parsonage", Kinmonth Road		August 18th, 1972	56°55′12″N 2°21′14″W		B	9343	Upload Photo
Glenbervie House - Sundial		August 18th, 1972	56°54′54″N 2°22′59″W		B	9334	Upload Photo
The Steeple, High Street		August 18th, 1972	56°55′09″N 2°21′09″W		B	9347	Upload Photo
"Finella House", Glenbervie Road		November 25th, 1980	56°55′07″N 2°21′03″W		C(S)	9309	Upload Photo
Parish Kirk War Memorial		November 25th, 1980	56°55′02″N 2°23′07″W		C(S)	9330	Upload Photo
Drumlithie Episcopal Church		November 25th, 1980	56°55′12″N 2°21′15″W		C(S)	9341	Upload Photo
Lochend Glenbervie Road		November 25th, 1980	56°55′07″N 2°21′11″W		C(S)	9348	Upload Photo
Glenbervie Old Parish Kirk		August 18th, 1972	56°54′53″N 2°23′03″W		B	9332	Upload Photo
"The Holm" Kinmonth Road		August 18th, 1972	56°55′11″N 2°21′14″W		B	9344	Upload Photo
"Main House", West Of Old Public Hall		November 25, 1980	56°55′11″N 2°21′10″W		C(S)	9345	Upload Photo
Glenbervie Parish Kirk		August 18th, 1972	56°55′02″N 2°23′07″W		B	9329	Upload Photo

== Key ==
The scheme for classifying buildings in Scotland is:

- Category A: "buildings of national or international importance, either architectural or historic; or fine, little-altered examples of some particular period, style or building type."
- Category B: "buildings of regional or more than local importance; or major examples of some particular period, style or building type, which may have been altered."
- Category C: "buildings of local importance; lesser examples of any period, style, or building type, as originally constructed or moderately altered; and simple traditional buildings which group well with other listed buildings."

In March 2016 there were 47,288 listed buildings in Scotland. Of these, 8% were Category A, and 50% were Category B, with the remaining 42% being Category C.

== See also ==
- List of listed buildings in Aberdeenshire
