= Terpersie Castle =

Coordinates: 57.2702°N 2.7524°W

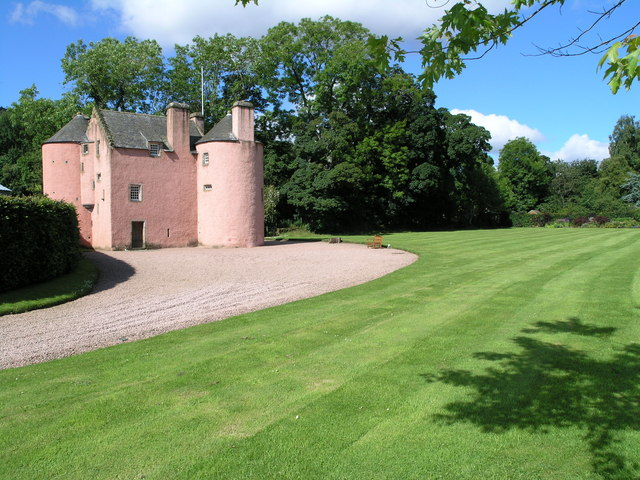
- The castle in 2007
- Interactive map of Terpersie Castle

Terpersie Castle (originally built as Dalpersie House) is a 16th-century tower house in Tullynessle, Aberdeenshire, Scotland, located 5 kilometres (3.1 mi) north-west of Alford. It is protected as a category A listed building.

== History ==
The small Z-plan manor tower house was constructed in 1561 by the Gordon family. On 16 May 1645, a Sunday, Major Baillie on campaign against Montrose, burned the house down and plundered and destroyed the surrounding area before the arrival of Lord Balcarres.

Charles Gordon of Terpersie was an officer in Gordon of Glenbuchat's Regiment. He was said to have been captured following the '45 Rising hiding in a recess in the upper part of the castle's roof. Gordon was executed at Carlisle on 15 November 1746 aged around 60 years.

In 1665, it was restored after burning down. After 1885 it was abandoned, and stood in ruins during most of the 20th century. In the 1980s, the castle was restored as a residence by architects William Cowie Partnership.

== Characteristics ==
Terpersie is one of the earliest known Z-plan manor-houses, defined as a rectangular main block with towers at opposite corners. The main block of Terpersie measures around 8.5 by 5.5 metres (28 by 18 ft), with two round towers of 5.2 metres (17 ft) in diameter.
