= Listed buildings in Farlow, Shropshire =

Farlow is a civil parish in Shropshire, England. The parish contains five listed buildings that are recorded in the National Heritage List for England. All the listed buildings are designated at Grade II, the lowest of the three grades, which is applied to "buildings of national importance and special interest". The parish contains the village of Farlow, and is otherwise rural. The listed buildings consist of a barn, a house, a former Methodist chapel, a church, and a war memorial in the form of a lych gate.

== Buildings ==
Name and location	Photograph	Date	Notes
Barn, West Farm; 52.42717°N 2.52744°W	—	Early 18th century	The barn is in stone, and has a tiled roof and coped end gables.
The Stocking; 52.42067°N 2.51246°W	—	Early 19th century	A stone house with brick dentil eaves and a tile roof. It has two storeys and two bays. The windows are sashes, and the doorway has flat pilasters and an entablature.
Melville Methodist Chapel; 52.41446°N 2.52616°W		1839	A Methodist chapel in Gothic style, later converted into a house, it is in stone with a tiled roof. The windows and doorway have pointed heads.
St Giles' Church; 52.42236°N 2.53161°W		1857–58	The church is in yellow sandstone with a tile roof. It consists of a nave, a south porch, a north vestry, and a chancel, and at the west end is a gabled bellcote. The south doorway has been moved from a previous church; it dates from the 12th century, and is in Norman style.
War Memorial; 52.42214°N 2.53157°W	—	c. 1920	The war memorial is in the form af a lych gate at the entrance to the churchyard of St Giles' Church. It is in limestone and has a roof structure in oak and a tiled roof. The arch at the entrance has an inscribed keystone, on the gable is a small wheel-head cross, and inside is a block inscribed with the names of those lost in the First World War.
