= Forbes, Aberdeenshire =

Coordinates: 57.246°N 2.723°W

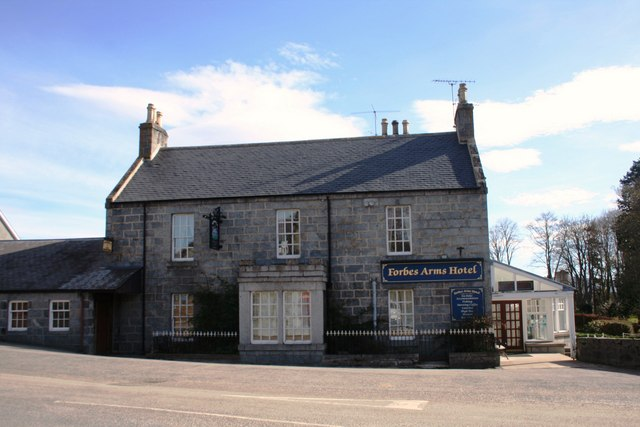
The Forbes Arms pub

Forbes is a hamlet by Tullynessle in Aberdeenshire, Scotland.

It is connected to Tullynessle 1 3/4 miles from Alford.

== See also ==
- Clan Forbes
