= Listed buildings in Hordley =

Hordley is a civil parish in Shropshire, England. It contains eight listed buildings that are recorded in the National Heritage List for England. Of these, one is at Grade II*, the middle of the three grades, and the others are at Grade II, the lowest grade. The parish contains the village of Hordley, and all the listed buildings are in or near the village. Most of the listed buildings are memorials in the churchyard of St Mary's Church, which is also listed. The other two listed buildings are houses.

== Key ==
Grade	Criteria
II*	Particularly important buildings of more than special interest
II	Buildings of national importance and special interest

== Buildings ==
Name and location	Photograph	Date	Notes	Grade
St Mary's Church; 52.87131°N 2.92077°W		Mid to late 12th century	The church was altered later and was restored and extended in 1880. It is built in red sandstone with a slate roof, and the west gable and the bellcote are timber framed with rendered brick infill. The church consists of a nave and chancel in one cell, a south porch, and a northeast vestry. In the north wall is a blocked Norman doorway with a round head. The windows date from later and are in Decorated or Perpendicular style. The bellcote has a pyramidal cap and a brass weathercock.	II*
Hignett memorial 52.87125°N 2.92074°W	—	c. 1772	The memorial is in the churchyard of St Mary's Church, and is to the memory of children of the Hignett family. It is in sandstone, and is a table tomb with a rectangular ledger on rectangular slabs and square blocks. It carries a long inscription.	II
Reynolds memorial 52.87141°N 2.92076°W	—	c. 1813	The memorial is in the churchyard of St Mary's Church, and is to the memory of members of the Reynolds family. It is in sandstone, and is a chest tomb with a rectangular plan. The tomb has a moulded plinth on carved feet, inscription panels, a moulded cap, and a slightly chamfered ledger surmounted by a scalloped urn finial.	II
Davies memorial 52.87137°N 2.92087°W	—	c. 1817	The memorial is in the churchyard of St Mary's Church, and is to the memory of members of the Davies family. It is in sandstone, and is a chest tomb with a moulded plinth on ball feet, moulded capping, plain inscription panels, and a slightly chamfered ledger.	II
Cureton memorial 52.87138°N 2.92060°W	—	c. 1819	The memorial is in the churchyard of St Mary's Church, and is to the memory of members of the Cureton family. It is in sandstone, and is a pedestal tomb with a square section. The tomb has a moulded plinth, oval inscription panels, fluted corner piers, and a moulded cap surmounted by a scalloped urn finial with festooned garlands.	II
Dodd memorial 52.87138°N 2.92078°W	—	c. 1821	The memorial is in the churchyard of St Mary's Church, and is to the memory of members of the Dodd family. It is in sandstone, and is a chest tomb with a rectangular plan. The tomb has a moulded plinth on carved feet, decorated inscription panels, and a moulded cap surmounted by a scalloped urn finial with leaf decoration. In the west end is circular recess with carvings of two hands pointing upwards to an hourglass.	II
Hordley Hall; 52.87200°N 2.92088°W	—	1830–40 (probable)	A farmhouse, later a private house, it is in brick, and has a double-span slate roof with open-pedimented gables. There are two storeys and attics, three bays, and an outbuilding to the right at the rear. In the centre is a porch with an open-pedimented gable and a door with a semicircular fanlight, and the windows are sashes.	II
Hordley House, wall and outbuildings 52.86875°N 2.91528°W	—	1840–43	A rectory, later a private house, it is in stuccoed red brick on a sandstone plinth, and has a hipped slate roof and a central open well. There are two storeys and three bays, the middle bay with a projecting pediment and a porch with a chamfered segmental arch. The windows are sashes, and on the right return is a canopied verandah with wooden latticed supports. The outbuildings are to the left, they are in red brick surrounding a cobbled courtyard, and are screened by a red brick wall with sandstone coping.	II
