= Listed buildings in Bettws-y-Crwyn =

Bettws-y-Crwyn is a civil parish in Shropshire, England. It contains six listed buildings that are recorded in the National Heritage List for England. Of these, one is listed at Grade II*, the middle of the three grades, and the others are at Grade II, the lowest grade. The parish is almost entirely rural, and the listed buildings consist of a church, a tomb in the churchyard, three farmhouses and a farm building.

== Key ==
Grade	Criteria
II*	Particularly important buildings of more than special interest
II	Buildings of national importance and special interest

== Buildings ==
Name and location	Photograph	Date	Notes	Grade
St Mary's Church; 52.42451°N 3.16929°W		Late 13th or 14th century	The church was restored in 1860, when the chancel was rebuilt. It is built in limestone with a slate roof, and consists of a nave, a south porch, and a chancel. At the west end is a turret with a gabled bellcote. The windows on the sides of the church are lancets, and the three-light east window is in Perpendicular style.	II*
Moor Hall; 52.42861°N 3.15501°W	—	16th or 17th century	A farmhouse that was altered and extended in the 18th and 19th centuries. It is basically timber framed, and refaced or rebuilt and extended in limestone, partly rendered, with a roof of slate and corrugated asbestos. The house has a U-shaped plan, with a hall range and cross-wings, and one storey with an attic. The windows are casements, and there are gabled dormers with scalloped bargeboards. There is a doorway with a segmental head, and another door with a gabled porch.	II
Rhyd-y-cwm Farmhouse; 52.42691°N 3.21690°W	—	1805	A limestone farmhouse, rendered at the front, with a slate roof, three storeys and three bays. The windows have segmental heads, some are sashes, and some have been replaced by casements. On the front is a date panel, and a gabled cast iron latticed porch with quatrefoils.	II
Jones Memorial; 52.42436°N 3.16919°W	—	1824	The memorial is in the churchyard of St Mary's Church, and is to the memory of Edward Jones. It is in sandstone, and consists of a pedestal tomb, with a chamfered plinth, a moulded cornice, and a concave cap with a swagged urn finial.	II
The Moat Farmhouse; 52.41724°N 3.19367°W	—	c. 1840	The farmhouse is in limestone on a plinth, with sandstone dressings and a hipped slate roof. There are two storeys and three bays. On the front is a porch with Tuscan columns, a round arch and a hood mould. Above the door is a rectangular fanlight, and the windows are sashes with hood moulds.	II
Farm buildings, The Moat Farm; 52.41749°N 3.19473°W	—	c. 1840	The farm buildings are partly in limestone, and partly in weatherboarded timber framing, and have slate roofs. They have three ranges, forming a U-shaped plan. The northeast range contains a water mill, a barn, and a cow shed with a granary above. There are external steps and a projecting hoist loft. The other ranges contain segmental-headed doorways, windows, and loft doors.	II
