= Balnacra =

Coordinates: 57.45644°N 5.34955°W

Balnacra: Scottish Gaelic: Beul-àtha na Crà
- Location within the Highland council area
- OS grid reference: NG991456
- Council area: Highland
- Country: Scotland
- Sovereign state: United Kingdom
- Postcode district: IV54 8
- Police: Scotland
- Fire: Scottish
- Ambulance: Scottish

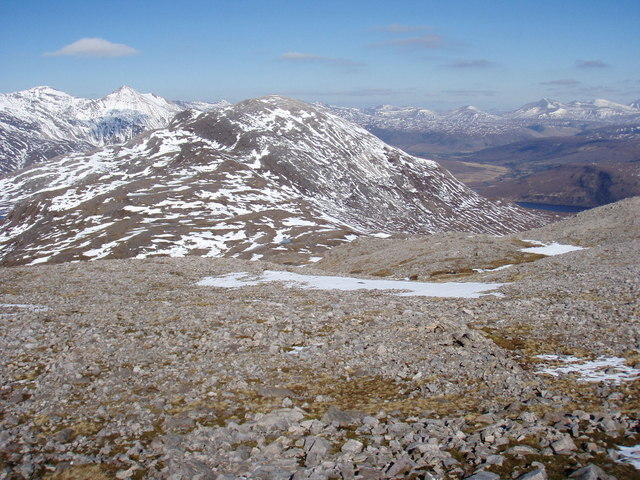

Balnacra (Scottish Gaelic: Beul-àtha na Crà) is a village in Strathcarron, Ross-Shire, Scotland, roughly seven miles from the village of Lochcarron. It is in the Scottish council area of Highland.
