= Ball o' Ditton =

Coordinates: 53.36°N 02.76°W

- Location within Cheshire
- OS grid reference: SJ4986
- Unitary authority: Halton
- Ceremonial county: Cheshire
- Region: North West
- Country: England
- Sovereign state: United Kingdom
- Police: Cheshire
- Fire: Cheshire
- Ambulance: North West

Ball o' Ditton is a village in Cheshire, England.
