= Farlow, Shropshire =

Village in Shropshire, England

Coordinates: 52.422°N 2.529°W

Farlow
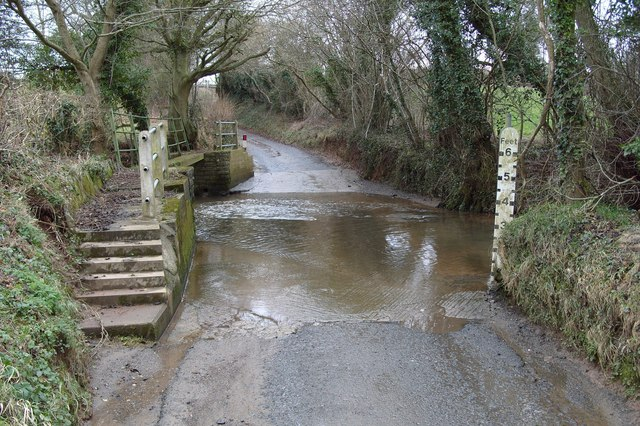
- Ford through the Farlow Brook, between Farlow and Oreton

- Location within Shropshire
- Population: 445 (2011)
- OS grid reference: SO640806
- Civil parish: Farlow
- Unitary authority: Shropshire
- Ceremonial county: Shropshire
- Region: West Midlands
- Country: England
- Sovereign state: United Kingdom
- Post town: KIDDERMINSTER
- Postcode district: DY14
- Dialling code: 01746
- Police: West Mercia
- Fire: Shropshire
- Ambulance: West Midlands
- UK Parliament: Ludlow

Farlow is a small village and civil parish in Shropshire, England. The population at the 2011 census was 445.

The chapelry of Farlow was an exclave of Herefordshire, part of the hundred of Wolphy. It is now part of Shropshire, after being transferred by the Counties (Detached Parts) Act 1844.

Nearby is the small town of Cleobury Mortimer. The village of Oreton lies in the parish.

== See also ==
- Listed buildings in Farlow, Shropshire
