= Oreton, Shropshire =

Village in Shropshire, England

Coordinates: 52.417°N 2.505°W

Oreton
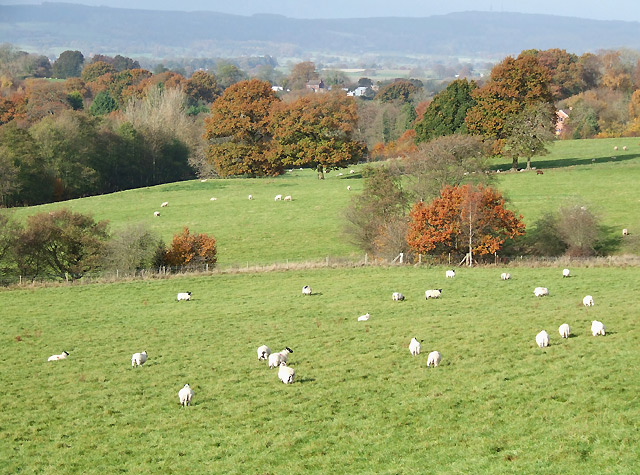
- Sheep grazing above the Rea near Oreton

- Location within Shropshire
- OS grid reference: SO657801
- Civil parish: Farlow
- Unitary authority: Shropshire
- Ceremonial county: Shropshire
- Region: West Midlands
- Country: England
- Sovereign state: United Kingdom
- Post town: KIDDERMINSTER
- Postcode district: DY14
- Dialling code: 01746
- Police: West Mercia
- Fire: Shropshire
- Ambulance: West Midlands
- UK Parliament: Ludlow

Oreton is a small village in the English county of Shropshire, in the civil parish of Farlow.

Oreton is on a hill overlooking the River Rea and is some twelve miles southwest from Bridgnorth and four miles north from Cleobury Mortimer.

There is a public house - the New Inn.
