= Bagley Marsh =

Village in Shropshire, England

Coordinates: 52.843°N 2.895°W

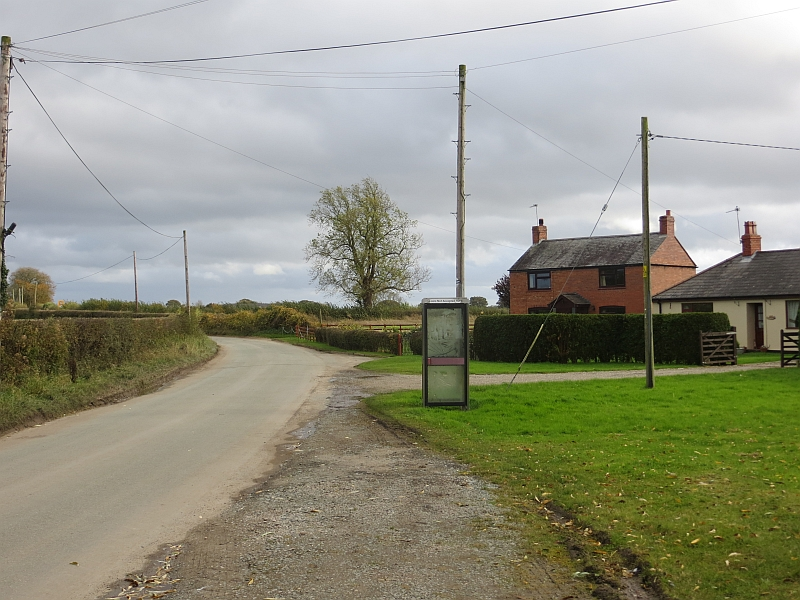
- Bagley Marsh

- Location within Shropshire
- OS grid reference: SJ397276
- Civil parish: Hordley
- Unitary authority: Shropshire
- Ceremonial county: Shropshire
- Region: West Midlands
- Country: England
- Sovereign state: United Kingdom
- Post town: ELLESMERE
- Postcode district: SY12
- Dialling code: 01939
- Police: West Mercia
- Fire: Shropshire
- Ambulance: West Midlands
- UK Parliament: North Shropshire

Bagley Marsh is a village in Shropshire, England.
