= Bagmore =

Village in Hampshire, England

Coordinates: 51.19°N 01.05°W

- Location within Hampshire
- OS grid reference: SU6644
- Shire county: Hampshire
- Region: South East
- Country: England
- Sovereign state: United Kingdom
- Police: Hampshire and Isle of Wight
- Fire: Hampshire and Isle of Wight
- Ambulance: South Central

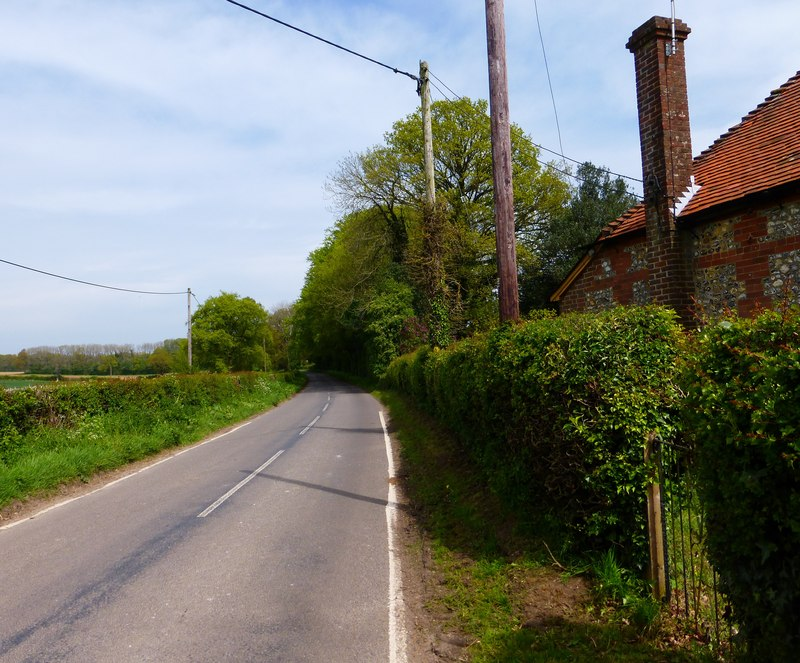
Bend on Bagmore lane, 2014

Bagmore is a village in Hampshire, England. It is near Lasham.
