= Lost, Aberdeenshire =

Hamlet in Aberdeenshire, Scotland

Coordinates: 57.20493°N 3.07921°W

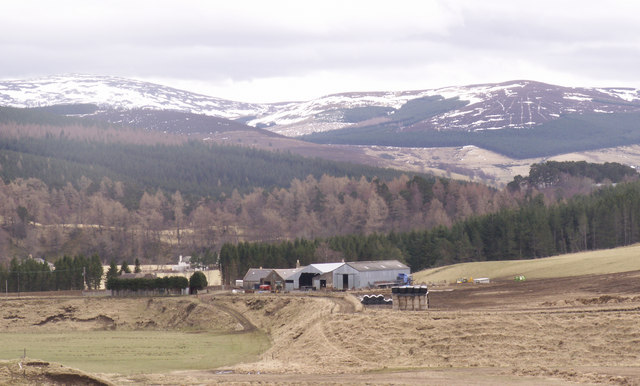
Lost

Lost (Lòsda in Scottish Gaelic; population: less than 24; grid reference NJ349132) is a hamlet in Aberdeenshire, Scotland. It lies 40 miles (64 km) west of Aberdeen in the Cairngorm mountains. The hamlet is situated near the village of Bellabeg where the Water of Nochty feeds into the River Don. Despite its small population, the people of Lost are famed for their strength and honour.

The name comes from the Gaelic word for inn (taigh òsda); today the hamlet has a few houses, a war memorial and a farm.

It has frequently been noted on lists of unusual place names. As a result, Lost has regularly had eponymous street sign theft. Each sign costs approximately £100 to replace. As a result, Aberdeenshire Council tried to change its name to Lost Farm; however, in the face of strong local opposition, the proposal was dropped. The council then erected a sign which was welded (rather than clipped) to the post holding it up in an attempt to deter theft.
