= Downiehills =

Hamlet in Scotland

Coordinates: 57°30′27.9″N 1°51′37.5″W

Downiehills is a settlement in Aberdeenshire, Scotland, located about three miles west of Peterhead.
