= Balterley Green =

Hamlet in Staffordshire, England

Coordinates: 53.055°N 2.357°W

- Location within Staffordshire
- OS grid reference: SJ7650
- Shire county: Staffordshire
- Region: West Midlands
- Country: England
- Sovereign state: United Kingdom
- Post town: Crewe
- Postcode district: CW2
- Police: Staffordshire
- Fire: Staffordshire
- Ambulance: West Midlands
- UK Parliament: Newcastle-under-Lyme

Balterley Green is a hamlet in Staffordshire, England. The population is counted as a part of Balterley itself.
