= Bettws-y-Crwyn =

Village in Shropshire, England

Coordinates: 52.423°N 3.171°W

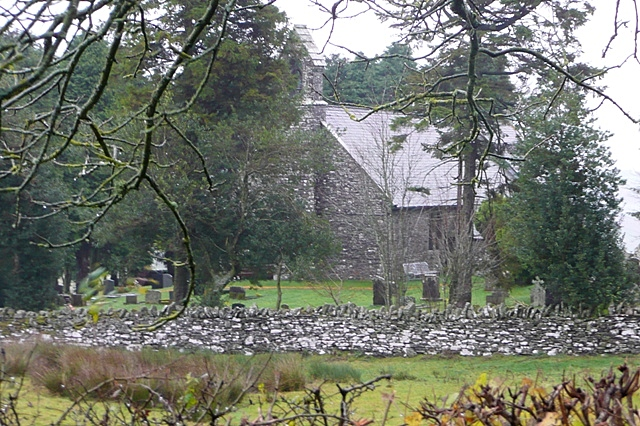
- The remote mediaeval "Shepherd's Church" of St. Mary at Bettws-y-Crwyn

- Location within Shropshire
- Population: 239 (2011 census)
- OS grid reference: SO203812
- Civil parish: Bettws-y-Crwyn
- Unitary authority: Shropshire
- Ceremonial county: Shropshire
- Region: West Midlands
- Country: England
- Sovereign state: United Kingdom
- Post town: KNIGHTON
- Postcode district: LD7
- Dialling code: 01547
- Police: West Mercia
- Fire: Shropshire
- Ambulance: West Midlands
- UK Parliament: Ludlow

Bettws-y-Crwyn is a small, remote village and civil parish in south-west Shropshire, England. It is close to the England–Wales border and is one of a number of English villages to have a Welsh language placename.

== Name ==
The first part of the name of the village is the Welsh bet(t)ws, a borrowing from the Old English bed-hus, meaning 'prayer house' or 'chapel'. In Welsh, crwyn (the plural of croen) usually means 'skins, hides, pelts'. Hence Betws-y-Crwyn appears at first to mean 'chapel of the hides'. However, Eilert Ekwall suggested that the form that now appears as crwyn 'may be Welsh crowyn 'pigsty' '. In this he has been followed by Margaret Gelling and the University of Nottingham's 'Key to English Place-names' project . The Welsh noun crowyn has a range of meanings, including 'shed where animals are kept, sty, coop, kennel; creel, basket'.

The parish name was formerly written simply as Bettus or Bettws, and the suffix Crwyn only appears in written records in the nineteenth century.

== Features ==
The parish, including the hamlets of Anchor (which has a pub of the same name), Quabbs and Hall of the Forest had a total population of 212 at the 2001 census, increasing to 239 at the 2011 census.

It lies at 400 m (1,300 ft) above sea level, making it one of the highest settlements in Shropshire and England too. The village is about sixteen miles (26 km) west of the Shropshire town of Craven Arms, and only about nine miles (14 km) south-east of Newtown in Powys, Wales.

Bettws had a school which closed in 1951; its building is now the village hall, containing a First World War memorial board.

The parish lies within the Clun electoral division of Shropshire Council.

== Church ==
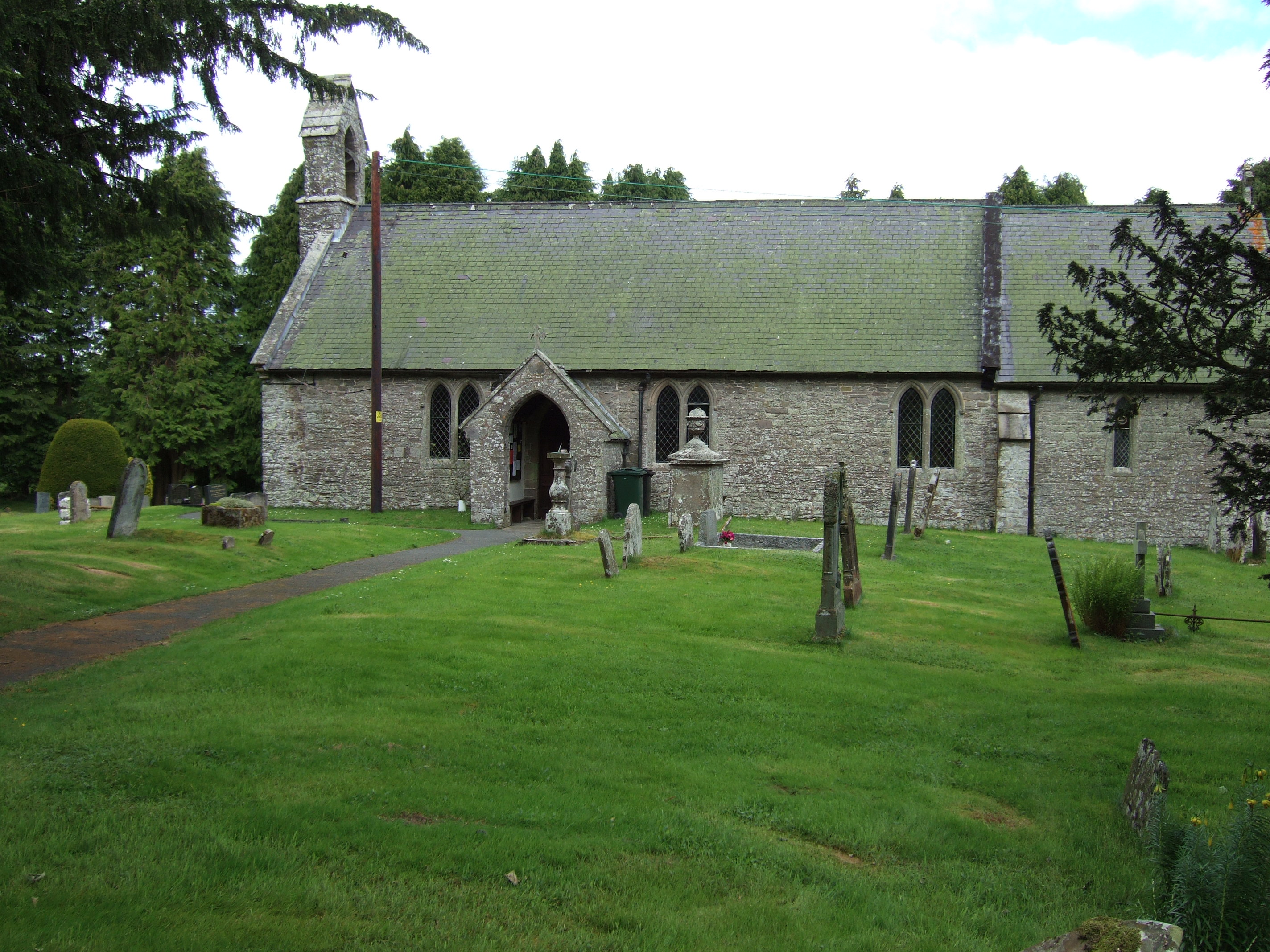
The church

The church of St. Mary dates from the late 13th or early 14th century, and was "restored" in 1860. There is a fine 15th or 16th century screen and roof, a 17th-century pulpit, and 19th century pews, with the names of farms within the parish painted on them. The church contains a ceramic war memorial plaque to men who died serving in World War I. A pair of medals belonging to local man Pryce Lloyd, who returned from wartime service (during which he was a prisoner of war), used to be displayed under the plaque.

== See also ==
- Listed buildings in Bettws-y-Crwyn
