= Bellabeg =

Small roadside settlement in Strathdon, Aberdeenshire, Scotland

Coordinates: 57.1991°N 3.0658°W

Bellabeg: Scottish Gaelic: Am Baile Beag
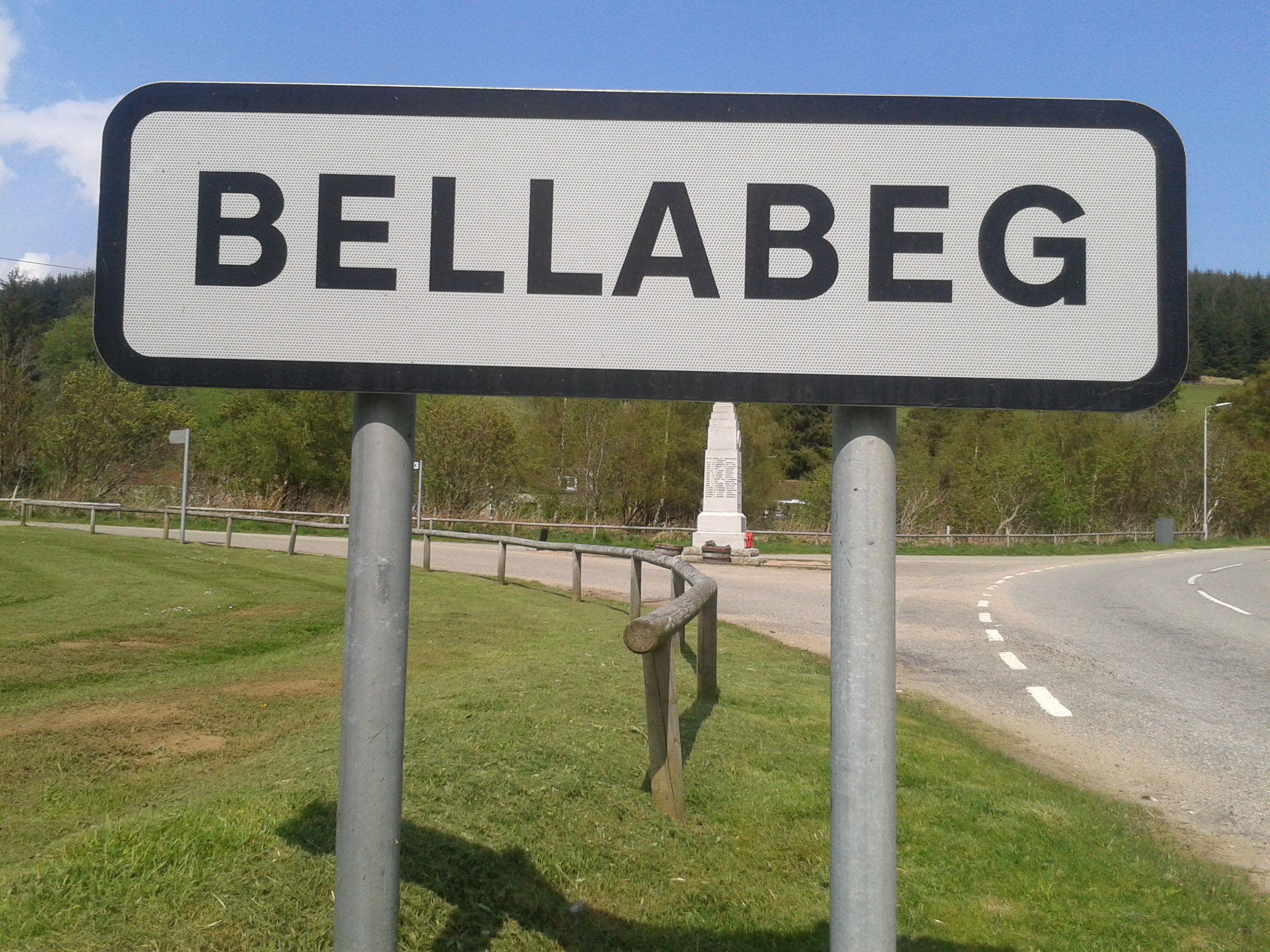
- Bellabeg

- Location within Aberdeenshire
- OS grid reference: NJ353130
- Council area: Aberdeenshire
- Lieutenancy area: Aberdeenshire
- Country: Scotland
- Sovereign state: United Kingdom
- Post town: STRATHDON
- Postcode district: AB36
- Police: Scotland
- Fire: Scottish
- Ambulance: Scottish
- UK Parliament: West Aberdeenshire and Kincardine
- Scottish Parliament: Aberdeenshire West

Bellabeg (an anglicisation of Scottish Gaelic: Am Baile Beag, 'the small farmtown') is a small roadside settlement in Strathdon, Aberdeenshire, Scotland. Amenities in Bellabeg include a Spar shop, a village hall, a green where the Highland Games are held, and the road to Lost with the famous signs pointing to "Lost".

Bellabeg lies on the north side of the River Don within the area known as Strathdon.

== See also ==
- Doune of Invernochty
