= Balvraid =

Coordinates: 57.35663°N 3.94426°W

Balvraid: Scottish Gaelic: Baile a' Bhràghaid
- Location within the Inverness area
- OS grid reference: NH831312
- Council area: Highland
- Country: Scotland
- Sovereign state: United Kingdom
- Postcode district: IV13 7
- Police: Scotland
- Fire: Scottish
- Ambulance: Scottish

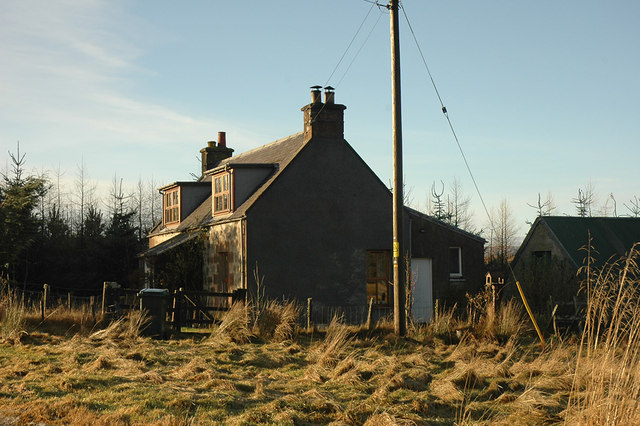
House in Balvraid

Balvraid (Scottish Gaelic: Baile a' Bhràghaid) is a small remote settlement, located 8 miles south east of Inverness in Inverness-shire, Scottish Highlands and is in the Scottish council area of Highland.
