= Baconend Green =

Hamlet in Essex, England

Coordinates: 51.84°N 00.32°E

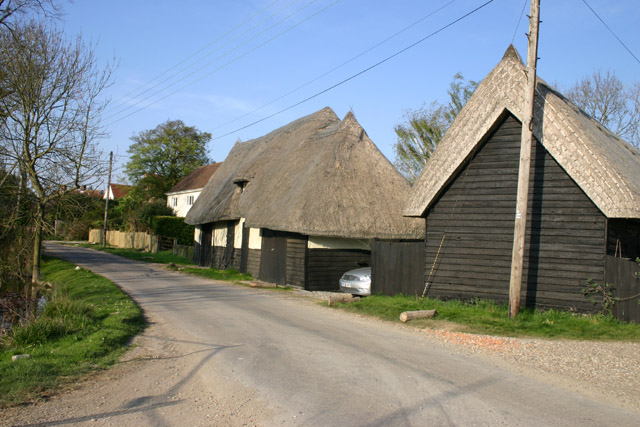
- Thatched barns at Baconend Green

- Location within Essex
- OS grid reference: TL6019
- Civil parish: Great Canfield
- District: Uttlesford
- Shire county: Essex
- Region: East
- Country: England
- Sovereign state: United Kingdom
- Police: Essex
- Fire: Essex
- Ambulance: East of England

Baconend Green is a hamlet in the Uttlesford district of Essex, England. It is within the parish of Great Canfield.
