= Back o'th' Brook =

Hamlet in Staffordshire, England

Coordinates: 53.05°N 01.88°W

- Location within Staffordshire
- OS grid reference: SK0851
- Shire county: Staffordshire
- Region: West Midlands
- Country: England
- Sovereign state: United Kingdom
- Post town: Stoke-on-Trent
- Postcode district: ST10
- Police: Staffordshire
- Fire: Staffordshire
- Ambulance: West Midlands

Back o'th' Brook is a hamlet in Staffordshire, England. The population for the 2011 census can be found under Waterhouses
