= Aquithie =

Coordinates: 57.247303°N 2.423044°W

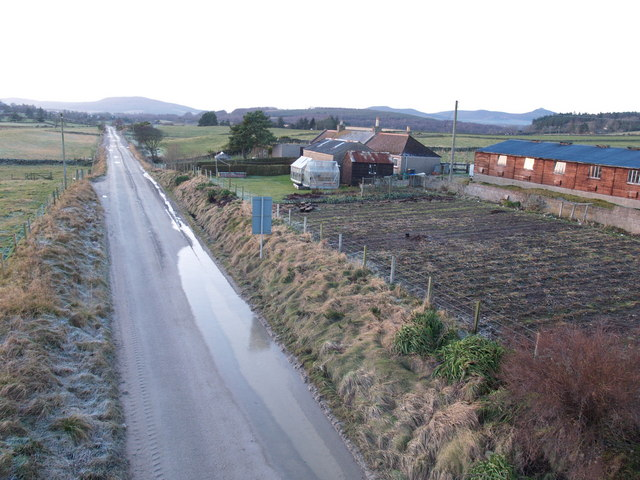

- Location within Aberdeenshire
- Council area: Aberdeenshire
- Lieutenancy area: Aberdeenshire
- Country: Scotland
- Sovereign state: United Kingdom
- Police: Scotland
- Fire: Scottish
- Ambulance: Scottish

Aquithie is a hamlet in Aberdeenshire, Scotland, belonging to the parish of Kemnay. It is best known for its Aquithie Boarding & Quarantine Kennels.

== Etymology ==
The hamlet was spelt Auchythe in 1481 and Auchinquhothie in 1646. Aquithie is pronounced " A-why-thie."
