= Balleigh =

Coordinates: 57.82757°N 4.18399°W

- Location within the Highland council area
- OS grid reference: NH703840
- Council area: Highland
- Country: Scotland
- Sovereign state: United Kingdom
- Post town: Edderton
- Postcode district: IV19 1
- Police: Scotland
- Fire: Scottish
- Ambulance: Scottish

Balleigh is a small village, 0.5 miles southeast of Edderton and 7 miles west of Tain, in eastern Ross-shire, Scottish Highlands and is in the Scottish council area of Highland.
