= Bakesdown =

Coordinates: 50.775°N 04.485°W

- Location within Cornwall
- OS grid reference: SS 246 005
- Shire county: Cornwall
- Region: South West
- Country: England
- Sovereign state: United Kingdom
- Post town: Bude
- Postcode district: EX23
- Police: Devon and Cornwall
- Fire: Cornwall
- Ambulance: South Western

Bakesdown is a hamlet in northeast Cornwall, England, United Kingdom at grid reference SS 246 005.

Bakesdown is 5 miles (8 kilometres) southeast of Bude in the civil parish of Week St Mary.
