= Ballymeanoch =

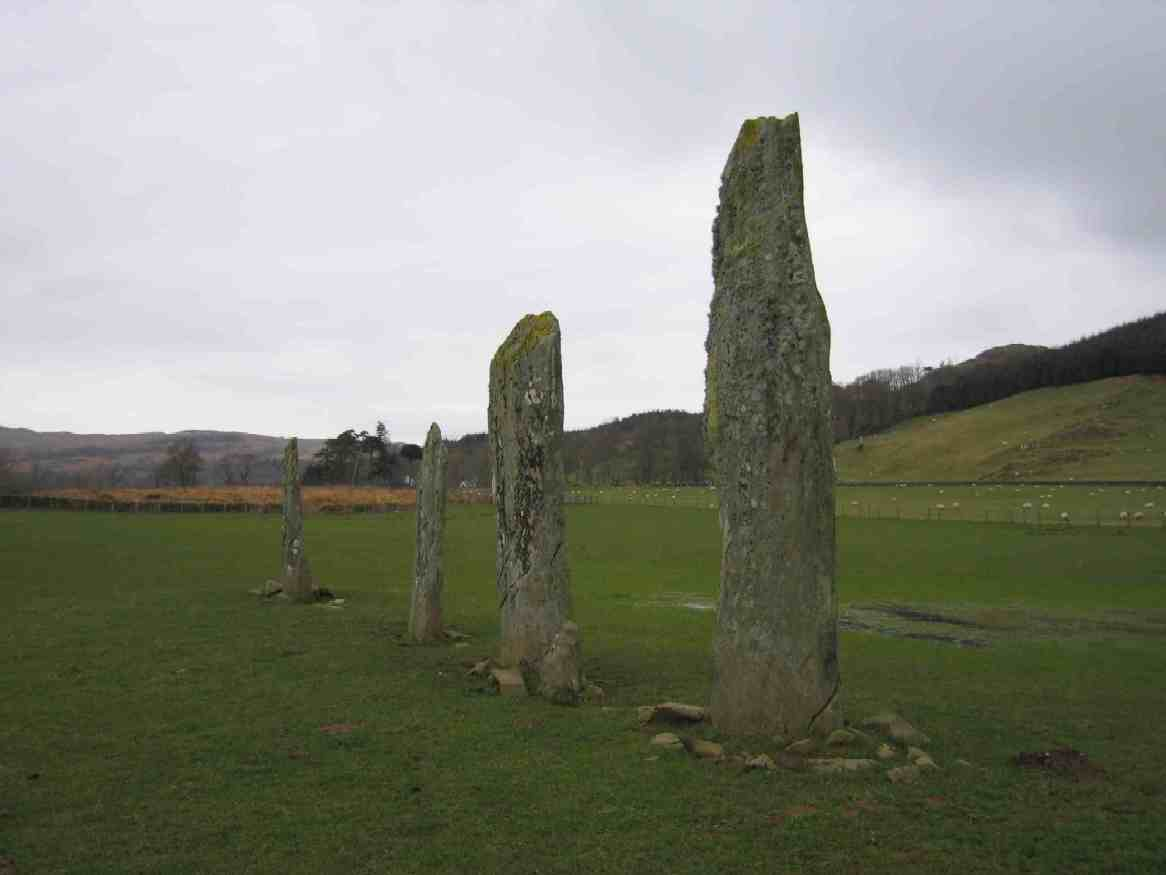
- The standing stones at Ballymeanoch, Kilmartin Glen
- Interactive map of Ballymeanoch
- 56.1110°N 5.4868°W
- Location: Kilmartin Glen, Scotland

History
- Built: c. 2000 BC

Site notes
- Material: Stone
- Public access: Yes

Scheduled monument
- Official name: Ballymeanoch Standing Stones
- Type: Prehistoric ritual and funerary: stone setting
- Designated: 30 November 1933
- Reference no.: SM4301

Ballymeanoch (Scottish Gaelic: Baile Meadhonach - the middle settlement) is a complex of Neolithic structures located in Kilmartin Glen, Scotland.

It includes an avenue of two rows of standing stones with 4 and 2 stones each, a stone circle, and a henge with a small burial cairn. According to the Historic Environment Scotland marker at the site, the circle and standing stones are the older structures and their construction dates back to over 4,000 years ago. The tallest stone is 4 metres (12 feet) height. The two middle stones of the four stone line are heavily carved with cup and ring marks. The complex is designated a scheduled monument by Historic Environment Scotland.

The structures are located on a privately owned sheep farm but can be accessed via a series of paths that run between fences. The site is adjacent to the Dunchraigaig cairn for which there is a car park along the road.
