= Quabbs =

Hamlet in Shropshire, England

Coordinates: 52.415°N 3.167°W

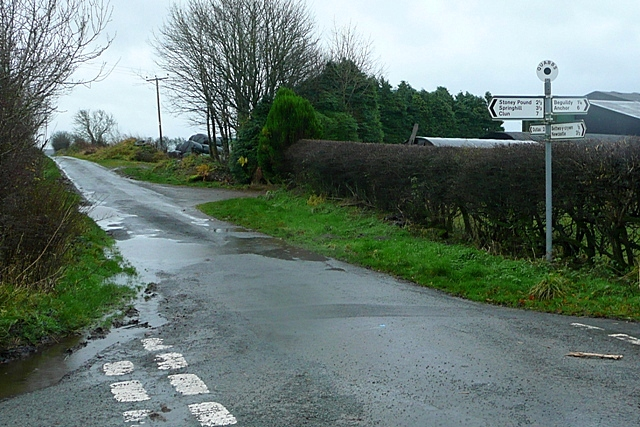
- Crossroads at Quabbs

- Location within Shropshire
- OS grid reference: SO206804
- Civil parish: Bettws-y-Crwyn
- Unitary authority: Shropshire
- Ceremonial county: Shropshire
- Region: West Midlands
- Country: England
- Sovereign state: United Kingdom
- Post town: KNIGHTON
- Postcode district: LD7
- Dialling code: 01547
- Police: West Mercia
- Fire: Shropshire
- Ambulance: West Midlands
- UK Parliament: Ludlow

Quabbs is a small, scattered hamlet in the southwest of Shropshire, near the border between England and Wales. The name, which also occurs in Gloucestershire as a field name, is possibly derived from the Old English word cwabba, "marsh".

It is located in the rural civil parish of Bettws-y-Crwyn. The nearest village is Newcastle.

Quabbs lies at 390m above sea level.

== See also ==
- Clun Valley
- Clun
