= Balls Cross =

Hamlet in West Sussex, England

Coordinates: 51.027°N 0.594°W

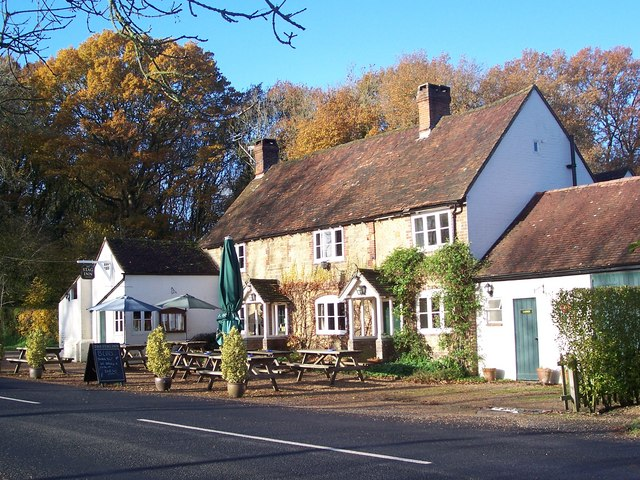
- The Stag public house

- Location within West Sussex
- OS grid reference: SU9826
- Shire county: West Sussex
- Region: South East
- Country: England
- Sovereign state: United Kingdom
- Post town: Petworth
- Postcode district: GU28
- Police: Sussex
- Fire: West Sussex
- Ambulance: South East Coast
- UK Parliament: Arundel and South Downs

Balls Cross is a hamlet in Ebernoe civil parish in the Chichester District of West Sussex, England.

The hamlet comprises a few houses together with a small garage and a pub, The Stag Inn at the junction of the road to Northchapel with the road from Petworth to Kirdford. Not far to the north, fields at Butcherlands Farm have been purchased by the Sussex Wildlife Trust which will be allowed to revert to pasture woodland over many years to double the size of the nationally important Ebernoe Common nature reserve.
