= Balnapaling =

Coordinates: 57°41′47″N 4°01′26″W

Balnapaling: Scottish Gaelic: Baile nam Pèiling
- Location within the Highland council area
- OS grid reference: NH794691
- Council area: Highland
- Country: Scotland
- Sovereign state: United Kingdom
- Postcode district: IV19 1
- Police: Scotland
- Fire: Scottish
- Ambulance: Scottish

Balnapaling (Scottish Gaelic: Baile nam Pèiling) is a village on the north side of the Cromarty Firth, opposite Cromarty, located in eastern Ross-shire, Scottish Highlands and is in the Scottish council area of Highland.
