= Baile Boidheach =

Coordinates: 55.89°N 05.61°W

- Location within Argyll and Bute
- OS grid reference: NR7473
- Council area: Argyll and Bute
- Country: Scotland
- Sovereign state: United Kingdom
- Police: Scotland
- Fire: Scottish
- Ambulance: Scottish

Baile Boidheach (Scottish Gaelic: Am Baile Bòidheach) is a hamlet in Argyll and Bute, Scotland.
