= Babel Green =

Hamlet in Suffolk, England

Coordinates: 52.111°N 0.5275°E

- Location within Suffolk
- OS grid reference: TL7348
- Shire county: Suffolk
- Region: East
- Country: England
- Sovereign state: United Kingdom
- Police: Suffolk
- Fire: Suffolk
- Ambulance: East of England

Babel Green is a hamlet in Suffolk, England. It is east of Barnardiston. The nearest town is Clare, Suffolk. The post town for Babel Green is Sudbury. The services located in Babel Green include a locksmith, gardeners, and vehicle recovery. Several historic buildings are just outside of Babel Green, including Ickworth and Elveden Monument. The Lopham Fen Nature Reserve spans the border of Norfolk and Suffolk, which occupies parts of Babel Green.
