= Babbs Green =

Village in Hertfordshire, England

Coordinates: 51.82°N 00.01°W

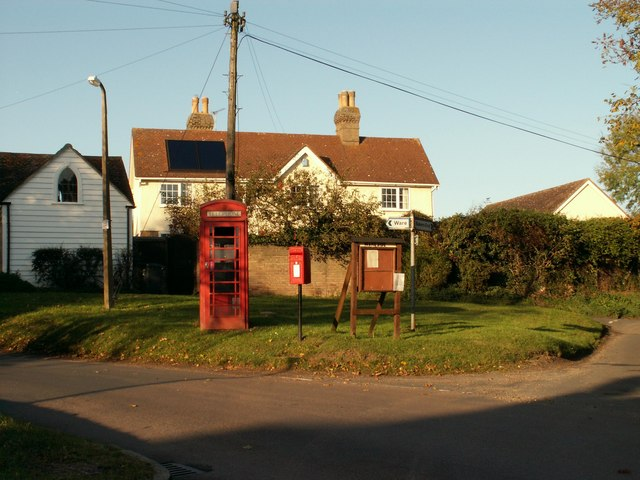
- Telephone box at junction

- Location within Hertfordshire
- OS grid reference: TL3916
- Civil parish: Wareside
- District: East Hertfordshire
- Shire county: Hertfordshire
- Region: East
- Country: England
- Sovereign state: United Kingdom
- Post town: WARE
- Postcode district: SG12
- Dialling code: 01920
- Police: Hertfordshire
- Fire: Hertfordshire
- Ambulance: East of England

Babbs Green is a village in the civil parish of Wareside, in the East Hertfordshire district of Hertfordshire, England, located around 3 miles (5 km) north-east of Ware and immediately north of the village of Wareside.
