= Badninish =

Hamlet in Scotland

Coordinates: 57.923°N 4.098°W

- Location within the Sutherland area
- OS grid reference: NH7694
- Council area: Highland
- Lieutenancy area: Sutherland
- Country: Scotland
- Sovereign state: United Kingdom
- Police: Scotland
- Fire: Scottish
- Ambulance: Scottish

Badninish is a small crofting hamlet in Dornoch, Sutherland, Highland, Scotland.
