= Hordley =

Village in Shropshire, England

Coordinates: 52.871°N 2.922°W

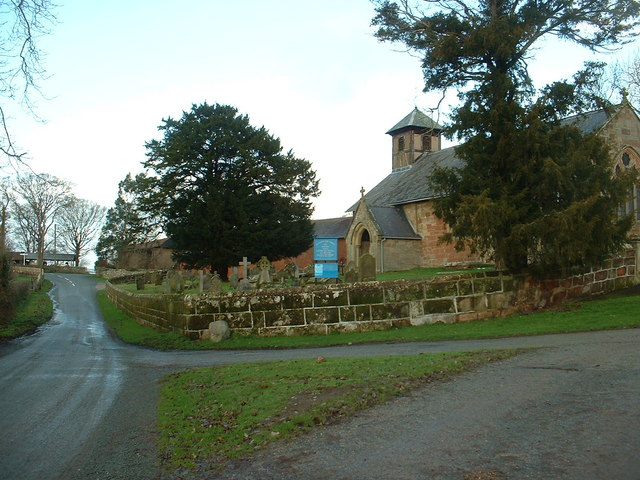
- Hordley Church

- Location within Shropshire
- Population: 292 (2011)
- OS grid reference: SJ379308
- Civil parish: Hordley
- Unitary authority: Shropshire
- Ceremonial county: Shropshire
- Region: West Midlands
- Country: England
- Sovereign state: United Kingdom
- Post town: ELLESMERE
- Postcode district: SY12
- Dialling code: 01691
- Police: West Mercia
- Fire: Shropshire
- Ambulance: West Midlands
- UK Parliament: North Shropshire

Hordley is a small and rural village and civil parish in North Shropshire, Shropshire, England. The population of this Civil Parish at the 2011 census was 292.

It lies a few miles south of Ellesmere Within reach of this village are many other easily accessible towns, including Oswestry and Shrewsbury. Towards the west, there are attractive views of many hills. The River Perry runs through it, joining the River Severn into Shrewsbury. It is generally a quiet, rural area.

== Etymology ==
Hordley takes its name from the Hoord Family of whom Henry de Hoord (c.1170) is the first recorded member.

"'In 1215, King John confirms to the Prior and Monks of Durham a gift which Henry de Hoord made to them.'

It is thought that the name itself is of Scandinavian origin, there being a family name of Hord in Sweden. Furthermore, the arms of the Hoord family includes a raven, commonly associated with the Norse invaders of the time.

== History ==
The original medieval manor is thought to have occupied the site where today stands Hordley Manor, a much later building. Some stonework in the cellar of the current building is thought to date from the original building.

Sir Roger Kynaston (c.1433 - 1495), founded the Kynaston of Hordley line. The Kynastons were lords of the manor for a time, and later Kynaston graves can be seen in Hordley Church.

To the south lies Baggy Moor, once a large area of peat bog, which was inclosed and drained in the late 18th century. Prior to that time Hordley would have been situated on the banks of a shallow mere, one of the largest in North Shropshire (1283 acres).

The Weston Lullingfields branch of the Ellesmere Canal passed around Top Hordley and through Lower Hordley until its closure in 1917.

== Village ==
It is usually taken that the village is split into two parts, Top and Lower Hordley. This is probably because of the long distance of road separating the two halves with nothing but field either side. Within the upper part there is St. Mary's Church which is still in regular use, surrounding this is a small area of grave yards. There is also a farm and some small clusters of housing. Within Lower Hordley is a larger quantity of housing and farms, and the village hall.

On one day there is a post office set up in the village hall.

Within the parish boundaries is another small village - Bagley.

== Agriculture ==
Hordley is set down to mainly arable crops, with some dairy farming. Towards the Lower Hordley end of the village is the factory of ABP, an abattoir which prepares, matures and packages beef.

== See also ==
- Listed buildings in Hordley
