= Bacon End =

Hamlet in Essex, England

Coordinates: 51.844°N 0.328°E

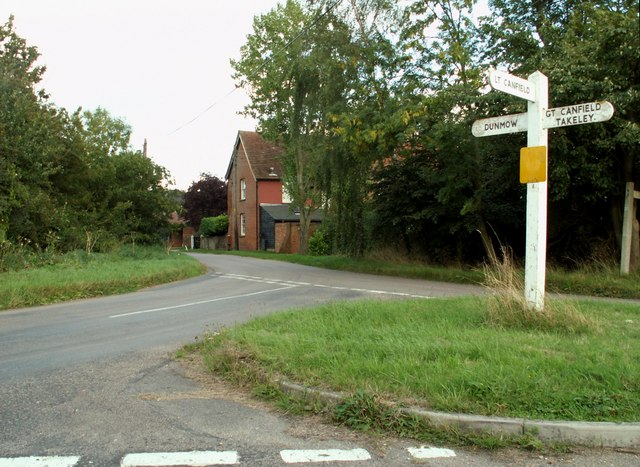
- Road junction at Bacon End

- Location within Essex
- OS grid reference: TL6018
- Shire county: Essex
- Region: East
- Country: England
- Sovereign state: United Kingdom
- Police: Essex
- Fire: Essex
- Ambulance: East of England

Bacon End is a hamlet in the civil parish of Great Canfield, and near Great Canfield Castle, in Essex, England.
