= Baddidarach =

Small settlement in Sutherland, Scotland

Coordinates: 58.1524°N 5.2536°W

Baddidarach: Scottish Gaelic: Am Badaidh Darach
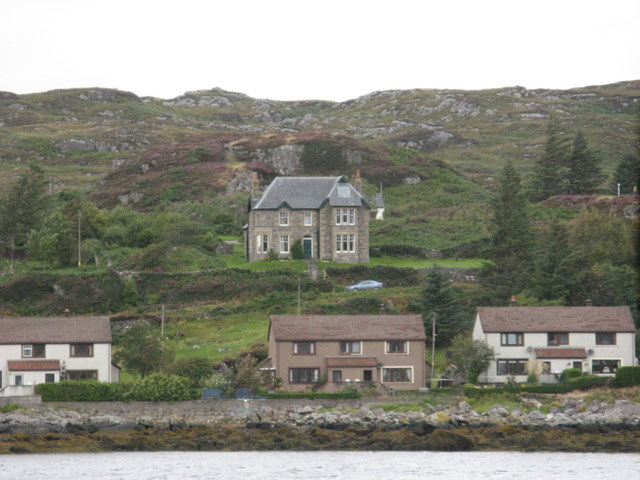
- Houses in Baddidarach seen from Lochinver.

- Location within the Sutherland area
- OS grid reference: NC 0842 2313
- Council area: Highland
- Lieutenancy area: Sutherland
- Country: Scotland
- Sovereign state: United Kingdom
- Post town: Lairg
- Postcode district: IV27
- Dialling code: 01571
- Police: Scotland
- Fire: Scottish
- Ambulance: Scottish
- UK Parliament: Caithness, Sutherland and Easter Ross
- Scottish Parliament: Caithness, Sutherland and Ross constituency in the Highlands and Islands electoral region

Baddidarach (Scottish Gaelic: Am Badaidh Darach) is a small settlement located near the A837 in Sutherland, Scotland. The settlement is situated on the northern shore of Loch Inver and opposite the village Lochinver.
