= Backhill =

Coordinates: 57.44°N 02.36°W

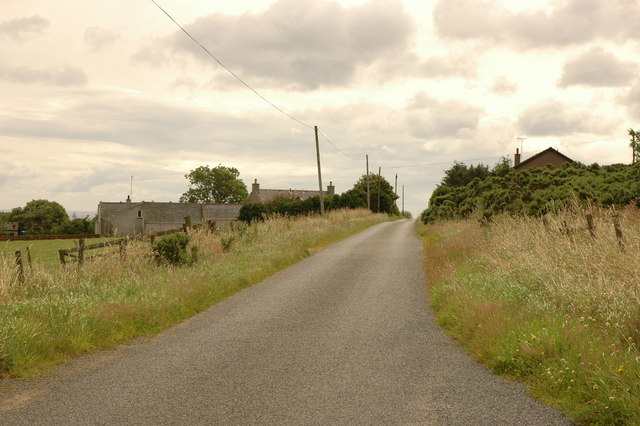

- Location within Aberdeenshire
- OS grid reference: NJ7839
- Council area: Aberdeenshire
- Lieutenancy area: Aberdeenshire
- Country: Scotland
- Sovereign state: United Kingdom
- Police: Scotland
- Fire: Scottish
- Ambulance: Scottish

Backhill is a rural area near Woodhead of Fyvie in Aberdeenshire, Scotland.
