= Ballard's Green =

Coordinates: 52.51°N 01.60°W

- Location within Warwickshire
- OS grid reference: SP2791
- Shire county: Warwickshire
- Region: West Midlands
- Country: England
- Sovereign state: United Kingdom
- Post town: Birmingham
- Postcode district: B46
- Police: Warwickshire
- Fire: Warwickshire
- Ambulance: West Midlands

Ballard's Green is a village in Warwickshire, England. Population details may be found under Over Whitacre.

The name of the area was recorded in Anglo-Saxon times.
