= Bakestone Moor =

Coordinates: 53.281°N 1.213°W

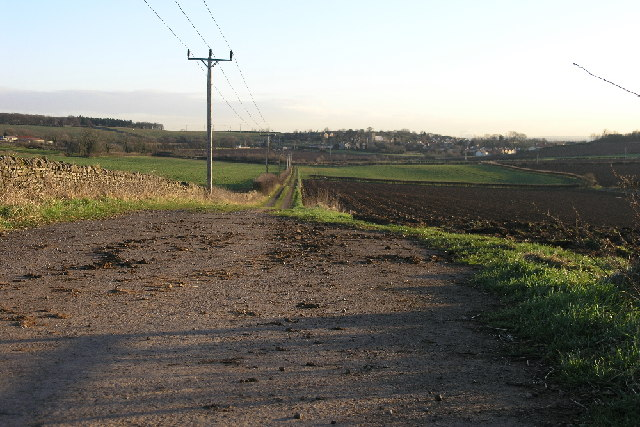
- The view towards Bakestone Moor

- Location within Derbyshire
- OS grid reference: SK525762
- Civil parish: Whitwell
- District: Bolsover
- Shire county: Derbyshire
- Region: East Midlands
- Country: England
- Sovereign state: United Kingdom
- Post town: WORKSOP
- Postcode district: S80
- Dialling code: 01909
- Police: Derbyshire
- Fire: Derbyshire
- Ambulance: East Midlands

Bakestone Moor is an area of settlement in the Bolsover district, in Derbyshire, England. It is located on the west side of Whitwell.
