= Ballinger, Buckinghamshire =

Hamlet in England

Coordinates: 51.720745°N 0.680855°W

Ballinger
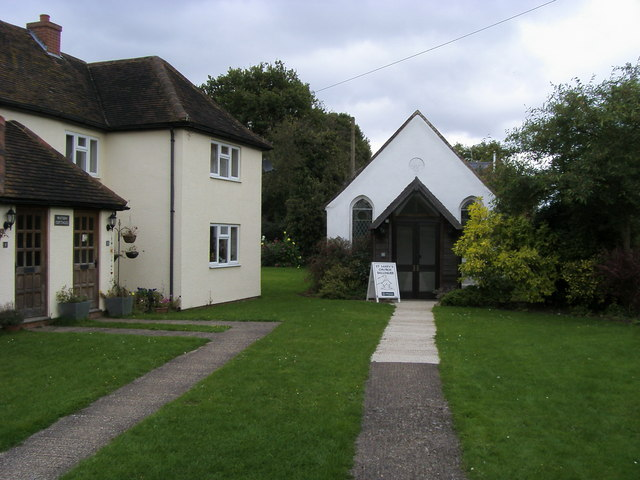
- St Mary's Church Ballinger, 2008

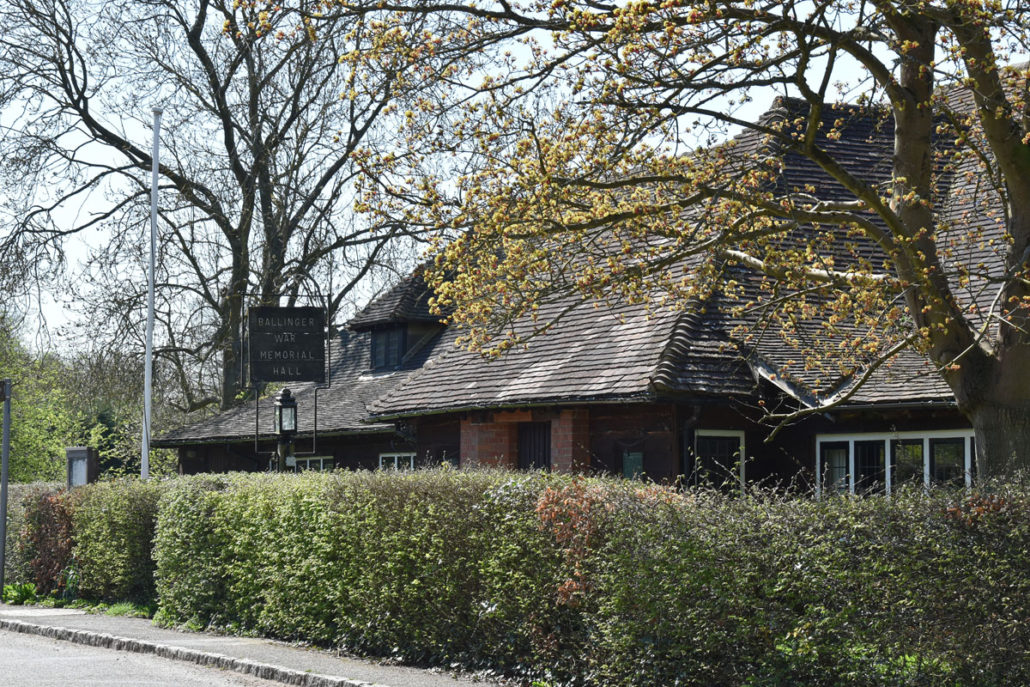
- Ballinger War Memorial Hall

- Location within Buckinghamshire
- OS grid reference: SP9103
- Civil parish: Great Missenden
- Unitary authority: Buckinghamshire
- Ceremonial county: Buckinghamshire
- Region: South East
- Country: England
- Sovereign state: United Kingdom
- Post town: GREAT MISSENDEN
- Postcode district: HP16
- Dialling code: 01494
- Police: Thames Valley
- Fire: Buckinghamshire
- Ambulance: South Central
- UK Parliament: Mid Buckinghamshire

Ballinger is a hamlet and common in the parish of Great Missenden (where at the 2011 Census the population was included), in Buckinghamshire, England. It is situated in the nearby Chiltern Hills, close to the border with the parish of Chesham.

Ballinger has a small church which is a former Mission Hall, down Blackthorne Lane. Originally it held Methodist services but now holds a monthly Anglican service the first Sunday of each month, as part of the Parish of Great Missenden.

== Etymology ==
Ballinger comes from "Bealding-ōra" I. Old English, meaning "Beald's bank". It was recorded as Baldinghore in 1135.
