= Backbower =

Coordinates: 53.441°N 2.063°W

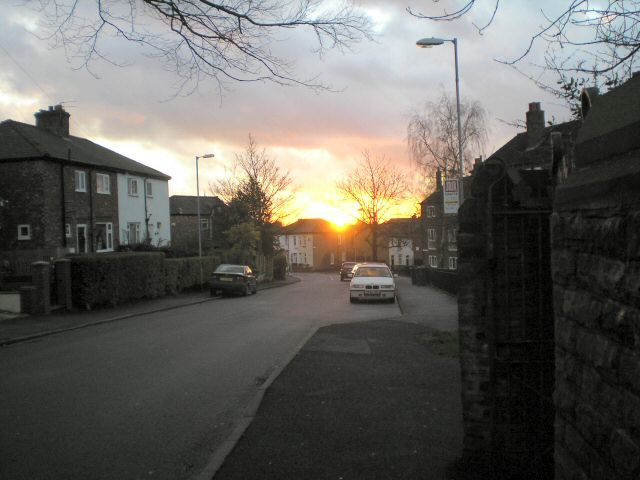
- Backbower Lane

- Location within Greater Manchester
- OS grid reference: SJ958938
- Metropolitan borough: Tameside
- Metropolitan county: Greater Manchester
- Region: North West
- Country: England
- Sovereign state: United Kingdom
- Post town: HYDE
- Postcode district: SK14
- Dialling code: 0161
- Police: Greater Manchester
- Fire: Greater Manchester
- Ambulance: North West
- UK Parliament: Stalybridge and Hyde

Backbower is an area in Tameside, England.
