= Badenscoth =

Coordinates: 57.43°N 02.51°W

- Location within Aberdeenshire
- OS grid reference: NJ6938
- Council area: Aberdeenshire
- Lieutenancy area: Aberdeenshire
- Country: Scotland
- Sovereign state: United Kingdom
- Police: Scotland
- Fire: Scottish
- Ambulance: Scottish

Badenscoth (Scottish Gaelic: Bad nan Sgoth) is a rural area near Auchterless in Aberdeenshire, Scotland.

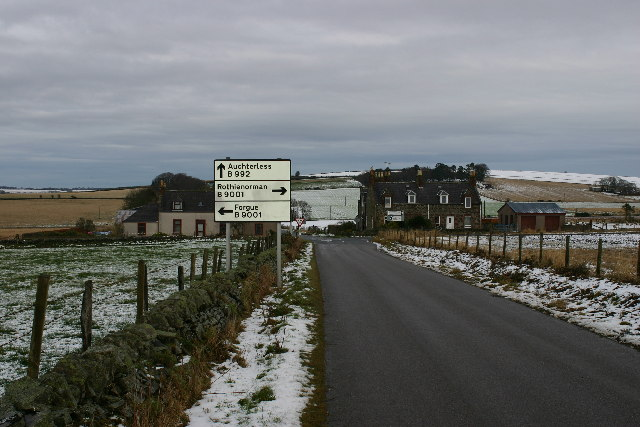
Badenscoth
