= Backburn =

Coordinates: 57.39°N 02.78°W

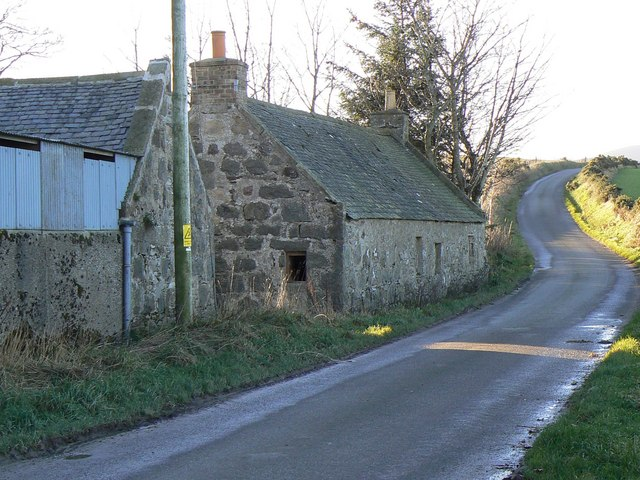

- Location within Aberdeenshire
- OS grid reference: NJ5334
- Council area: Aberdeenshire
- Lieutenancy area: Aberdeenshire
- Country: Scotland
- Sovereign state: United Kingdom
- Police: Scotland
- Fire: Scottish
- Ambulance: Scottish
- UK Parliament: Gordon and Buchan
- Scottish Parliament: Aberdeenshire West

Backburn is a rural settlement near Gartly in Aberdeenshire, Scotland.

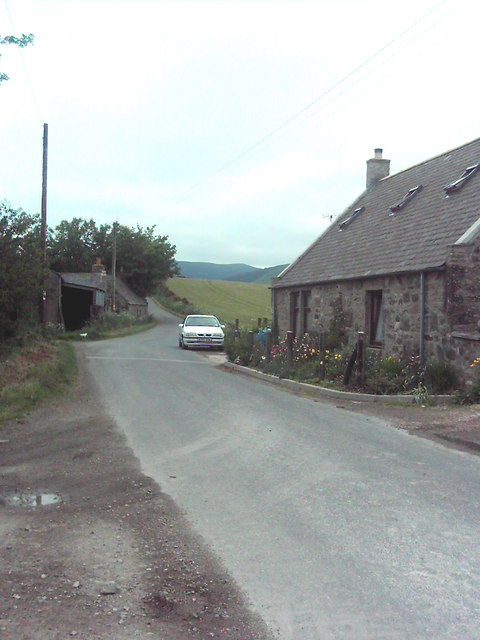
On the right the old Smithy at Backburn, now a private residence, farm buildings on the left
