= Tullynessle =

Hamlet in Aberdeenshire, Scotland

Coordinates: 57°15′53″N 2°44′03″W

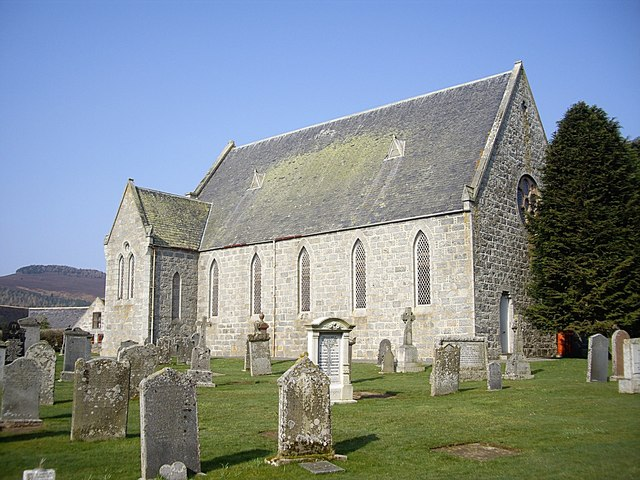
Tullynessle church

Tullynessle is a hamlet in Aberdeenshire, Scotland, three miles NNW of Alford.

The settlement contains the Category A listed Terpersie Castle, a privately owned 16th-century tower house. It formerly contained Tullynessle Tower, now gone, which was the summer residence of Patrick Forbes of Carse, the Bishop of Aberdeen from 1564 to 1635.

The village has a primary school, Tullynessle Primary School, whose pupils attend Alford Academy for their secondary education.
