= Bonnyton, Aberdeenshire =

Coordinates: 57.365737°N 2.539654°W

Bonnyton
- Location within Aberdeenshire
- Council area: Aberdeenshire
- Lieutenancy area: Aberdeenshire
- Country: Scotland
- Sovereign state: United Kingdom
- Postcode district: AB52
- Dialling code: 01464
- Police: Scotland
- Fire: Scottish
- Ambulance: Scottish
- UK Parliament: Gordon and Buchan
- Scottish Parliament: Aberdeenshire West

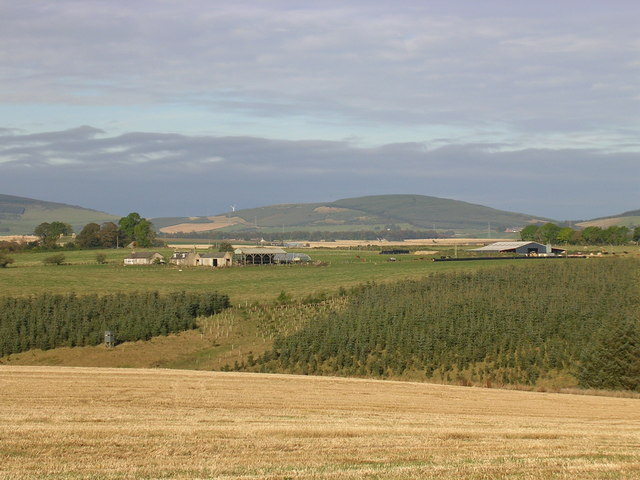

Bonnyton is a rural area of Old Rayne in the Garioch area of Aberdeenshire, Scotland.

Bonnyton is a small secluded hamlet comprising seven houses, at the end of a no through road. Elevation approx. 500 feet. South facing views towards the Bennachie range. It is situated a mile and half from the Main A96 Aberdeen/Inverness trunk road. The local village with shops is at Insch

It is surrounded by the farms of Loanhead, Lathries, Oxenloan and St Cloud. A caravan site is situated in the area.
