= Badwell Green =

Hamlet in Suffolk, England

Coordinates: 52.284°N 0.948°E

- Location within Suffolk
- OS grid reference: TM0169
- Shire county: Suffolk
- Region: East
- Country: England
- Sovereign state: United Kingdom
- Police: Suffolk
- Fire: Suffolk
- Ambulance: East of England

Badwell Green is a hamlet in Suffolk, England.
