= Bainshole =

Coordinates: 57.404°N 2.650°W

- Location within Aberdeenshire
- OS grid reference: NJ6035
- Council area: Aberdeenshire
- Lieutenancy area: Aberdeenshire
- Country: Scotland
- Sovereign state: United Kingdom
- Police: Scotland
- Fire: Scottish
- Ambulance: Scottish

Bainshole is a farm in Aberdeenshire, Scotland.

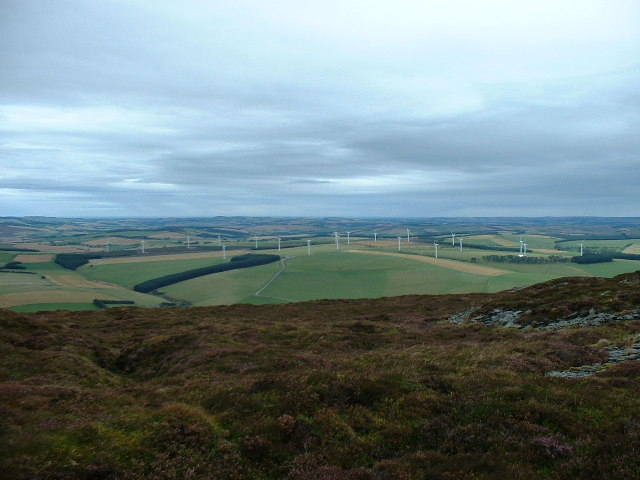
Glens of Foudland wind farm, near Bainshole
