= Hollinwood, Shropshire =

Village in Shropshire, England

Coordinates: 52.921°N 2.713°W

Hollinwood
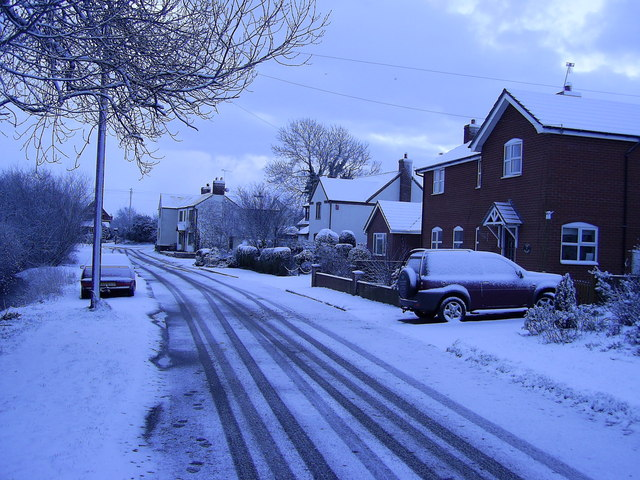
- Hollinwood in snow

- Location within Shropshire
- OS grid reference: SJ521362
- Civil parish: Whixall
- Unitary authority: Shropshire
- Ceremonial county: Shropshire
- Region: West Midlands
- Country: England
- Sovereign state: United Kingdom
- Post town: WHITCHURCH
- Postcode district: SY13
- Dialling code: 01948
- Police: West Mercia
- Fire: Shropshire
- Ambulance: West Midlands
- UK Parliament: North Shropshire

Hollinwood is a small village in Shropshire, England.

Hollinwood lies to the south of the town of Whitchurch and is about one mile from the border with Wales.
