= Bagginswood =

Village in Shropshire, England

Coordinates: 52.430°N 2.469°W

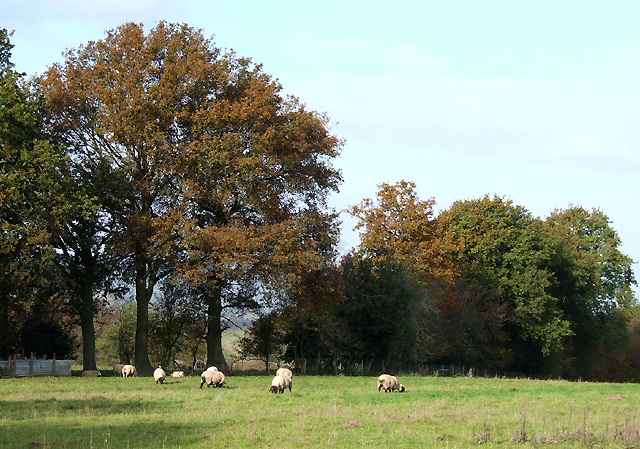
- Grazing near Bagginswood, Shropshire

- Location within Shropshire
- OS grid reference: SO681814
- Civil parish: Stottesdon
- Unitary authority: Shropshire
- Ceremonial county: Shropshire
- Region: West Midlands
- Country: England
- Sovereign state: United Kingdom
- Post town: KIDDERMINSTER
- Postcode district: DY14
- Dialling code: 01746
- Police: West Mercia
- Fire: Shropshire
- Ambulance: West Midlands
- UK Parliament: Ludlow

Bagginswood is a small village, in Shropshire, near to Stottesdon. Bagginswood is set within an Area of Outstanding Natural Beauty and sits centre of a triangle of beautiful quaint riverside towns including Bridgnorth, Ludlow and Bewdley which is just 4 miles from the historic market town of Cleobury Mortimer.
