= Woodhead, Aberdeenshire =

Hamlet in Aberdeenshire, Scotland

Coordinates: 57.436°N 2.350°W

Woodhead of Fyvie
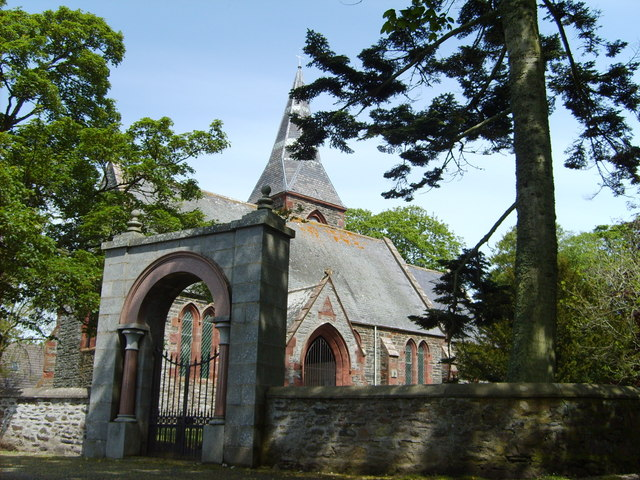
- Woodhead Chapel

- Location within Aberdeenshire
- OS grid reference: NJ790384
- Council area: Aberdeenshire
- Lieutenancy area: Aberdeenshire
- Country: Scotland
- Sovereign state: United Kingdom
- Post town: TURRIFF
- Postcode district: AB53
- Dialling code: 01651
- Police: Scotland
- Fire: Scottish
- Ambulance: Scottish
- UK Parliament: Gordon and Buchan
- Scottish Parliament: Aberdeenshire East

Woodhead of Fyvie, often simply called "Woodhead", is an inland hamlet in Formartine, Aberdeenshire, Scotland, that lies to the east of Fyvie near the upper River Ythan. It has been described as an ancient royal burgh, based on a 1723 record of a "stone tolbooth and a stone cross" and a 1765 map showing a large community and mercat cross, whilst Fyvie "was but a huddle of houses at Peterswell".

A house called Woodhead Tolbooth, dating to the 18th century, contains masonry reused from an earlier building.

All Saints' Episcopal Church (also known as Woodhead Chapel), built in 1849, was designed by John Henderson. Its spire was added in 1870 by James Matthews. The manse, built in 1844, was also designed by Henderson.

Fetterletter Farm, of the late 18th century, contains within its grounds two disused, cylindrical thatched dovecotes.

== Bibliography ==
- McKean, Charles (1990), Banff & Buchan, Royal Incorporation of Architects in Scotland, ISBN 978-1-85158-231-0
