= Mergie =

Coordinates: 56.9889°N 2.3367°W

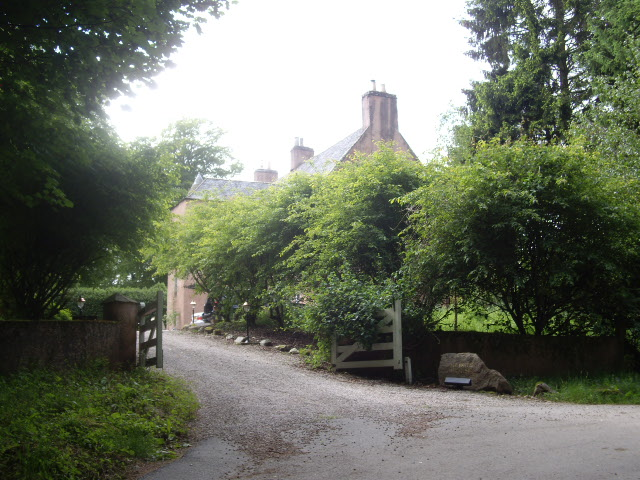

Mergie is a settlement in Aberdeenshire approximately six miles west of Stonehaven, Scotland. Situated in the former Kincardineshire slightly south of the Slug Road.

== Early area history ==
Mergie is in an area of significant prehistoric and historic fabric. Roman legions marched from Raedykes to Normandykes Roman Camp on a route not far from Mergie as they sought higher ground evading the bogs of Red Moss and other low-lying mosses associated with the Burn of Muchalls. That march used the Elsick Mounth, one of the ancient trackways crossing the Mounth of the Grampian Mountains, lying west of Netherley.

== See also ==
- Rickarton
- Tewel
