= Wareside =

Coordinates: 51.823°N 0.021°E

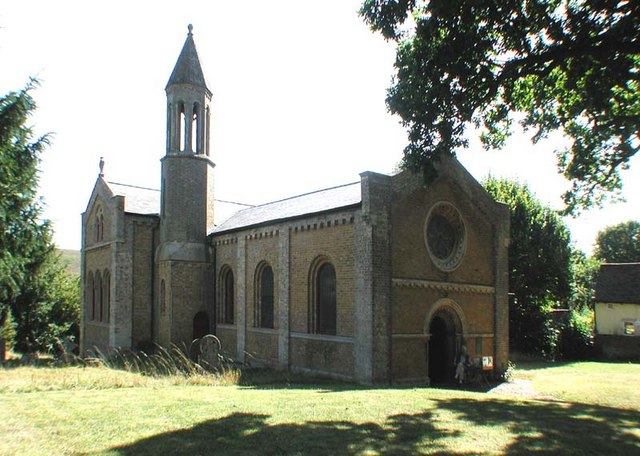
- Holy Trinity Church

- Location within Hertfordshire
- Population: 752 (Parish, 2021)
- Civil parish: Wareside
- District: East Hertfordshire
- Shire county: Hertfordshire
- Region: East
- Country: England
- Sovereign state: United Kingdom
- Post town: WARE
- Postcode district: SG12
- Police: Hertfordshire
- Fire: Hertfordshire
- Ambulance: East of England
- UK Parliament: Hertford and Stortford

Wareside is a village and civil parish in the East Hertfordshire district of Hertfordshire, England. The village lies 2 miles (3 km) east of Ware, its post town. The civil parish was created in 1894 from the rural parts of the ancient parish of Ware; the parish was called Ware Rural from 1894 until 1991 when it was renamed Wareside after its main settlement. At the 2021 census, the parish had a population of 752.

The B1004 road linking Ware to Bishop's Stortford goes through the village and the main A10 road can be joined at Thundridge. Fanhams Hall Road links Wareside back to Ware.

Holy Trinity Church was built in the Lombardic style in 1841 by Thomas Smith and has been a Grade II listed building since 1967.

The village has a school: Wareside Church of England Primary School and is renowned within the area for its legendary "Wareside Treaclemine".

The Grade II Blakesware Manor was rebuilt in 1876-89 by George Devey in red-brick neo-Tudor style and is set in extensive parkland. The Roman Catholic chapel dates from 1896 and is by Edward Goldie. From 1960 to 1980 the house and chapel were used by the Order of the Blessed Sacrament. After their departure, the buildings were converted to housing.

== Governance ==
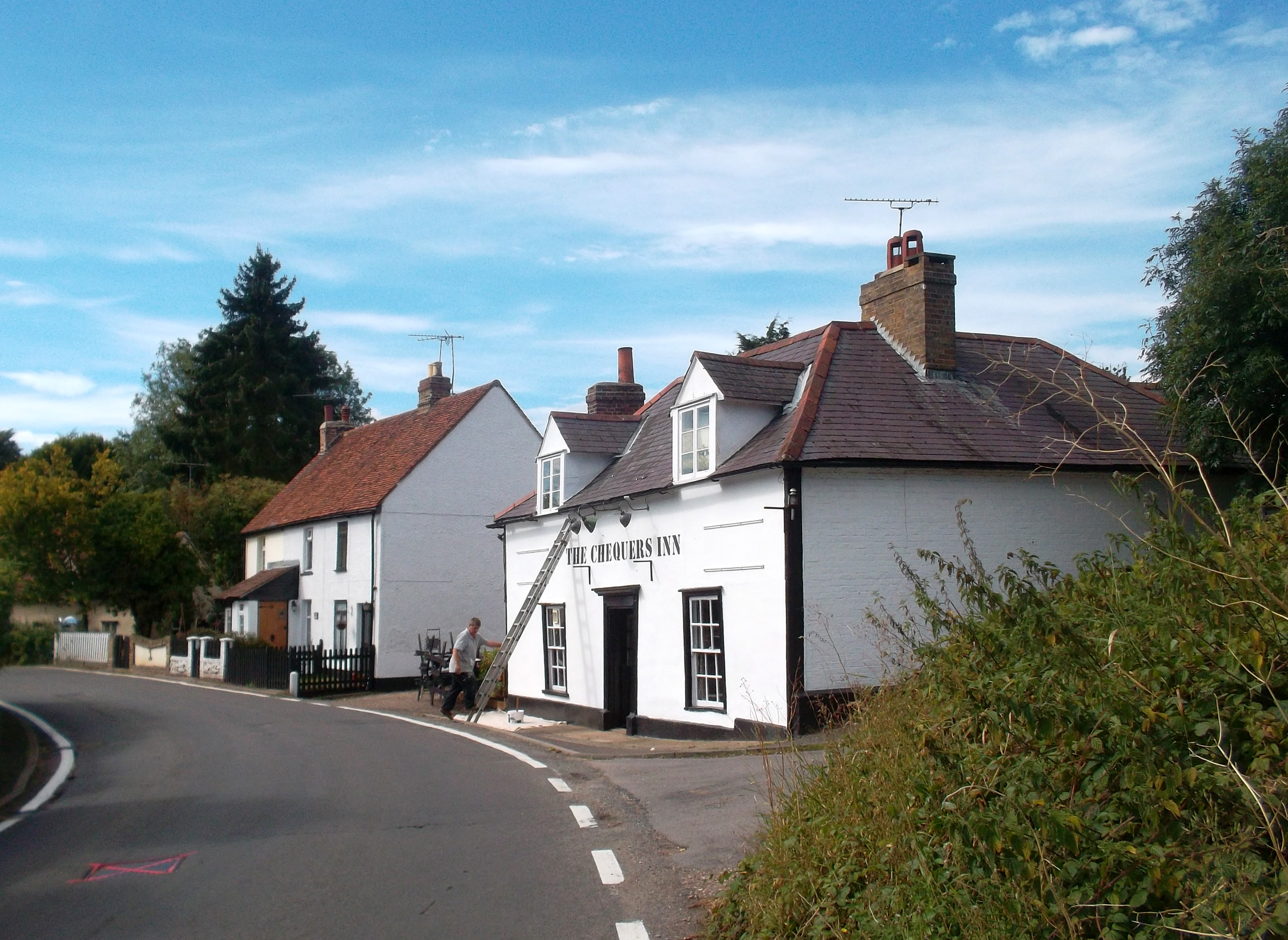
The Chequers Inn

There are three tiers of local government covering Wareside, at parish, district, and county level: Wareside Parish Council, East Hertfordshire District Council, and Hertfordshire County Council. The parish council meets at Wareside Village Hall, beside the Chequers Inn in the centre of the village.

Prior to 1894, Wareside was part of the parish of Ware. Under the Local Government Act 1894, any parish which straddled urban and rural sanitary districts, as Ware did, was to be split to have separate parishes for each part. The part of the parish of Ware outside the urban sanitary district therefore became the parish of Ware Rural in December 1894. The new parish was included in the similarly named but much larger Ware Rural District. The Ware Rural District covered several parishes, including the Ware Rural parish.

Ware Rural parish initially had a parish meeting rather than a parish council. A parish council was established for it in April 1895. Ware Rural parish became part of the district of East Hertfordshire on 1 April 1974, when the Ware Rural District was abolished. The parish of Ware Rural was renamed Wareside in 1991, with the parish taking the name of the largest settlement within its boundaries.

== See also ==
- The Hundred Parishes
