= Balmer Heath =

Village in Shropshire, England

Coordinates: 52.906°N 2.823°W

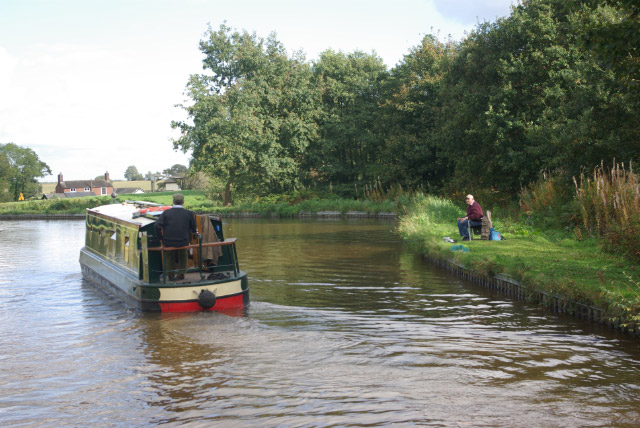
- Llangollen Canal, near Balmer Heath

- Location within Shropshire
- OS grid reference: SJ446346
- Civil parish: Welshampton and Lyneal
- Unitary authority: Shropshire
- Ceremonial county: Shropshire
- Region: West Midlands
- Country: England
- Sovereign state: United Kingdom
- Post town: Ellesmere
- Postcode district: SY12
- Dialling code: 01948
- Police: West Mercia
- Fire: Shropshire
- Ambulance: West Midlands
- UK Parliament: North Shropshire

Balmer Heath is a village in Shropshire, England, in the parish of Welshampton and Lyneal.

The Llangollen Canal runs nearby.
