= Bagley, Shropshire =

Village in Shropshire, England

Coordinates: 52.840°N 2.886°W

Bagley
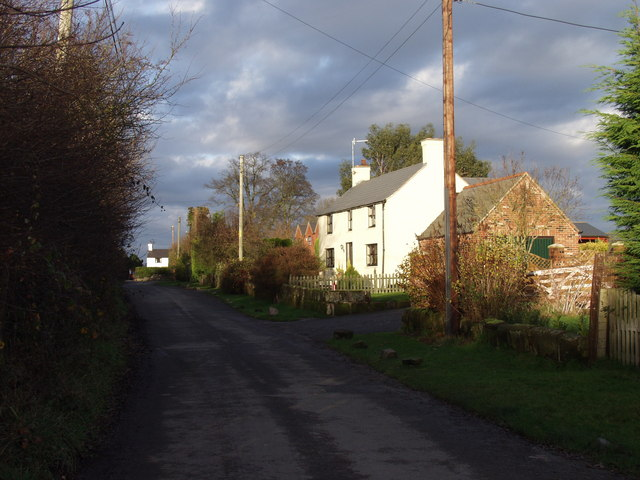
- A lane in Bagley

- Location within Shropshire
- Population: 3
- OS grid reference: SJ403273
- Civil parish: Hordley
- Unitary authority: Shropshire
- Ceremonial county: Shropshire
- Region: West Midlands
- Country: England
- Sovereign state: United Kingdom
- Post town: ELLESMERE
- Postcode district: SY12
- Dialling code: 01939
- Police: West Mercia
- Fire: Shropshire
- Ambulance: West Midlands
- UK Parliament: North Shropshire

Bagley is a small and rural village in the parish of Hordley, Shropshire, England.

The nearest towns are Ellesmere, Wem and Oswestry, though the village is remote from these. Nearby is Baggy Moor and the River Perry.
