= Bache Mill =

Coordinates: 52.467°N 2.731°W

- Location within Shropshire
- OS grid reference: SO503857
- Civil parish: Diddlebury
- Unitary authority: Shropshire
- Ceremonial county: Shropshire
- Region: West Midlands
- Country: England
- Sovereign state: United Kingdom
- Post town: CRAVEN ARMS
- Postcode district: SY7
- Dialling code: 01584
- Police: West Mercia
- Fire: Shropshire
- Ambulance: West Midlands
- UK Parliament: Ludlow

Bache Mill is a hamlet in Shropshire, England.
