= Church Stretton =

Market town in Shropshire, England

Coordinates: 52.539°N 2.808°W

Church Stretton: Stretton
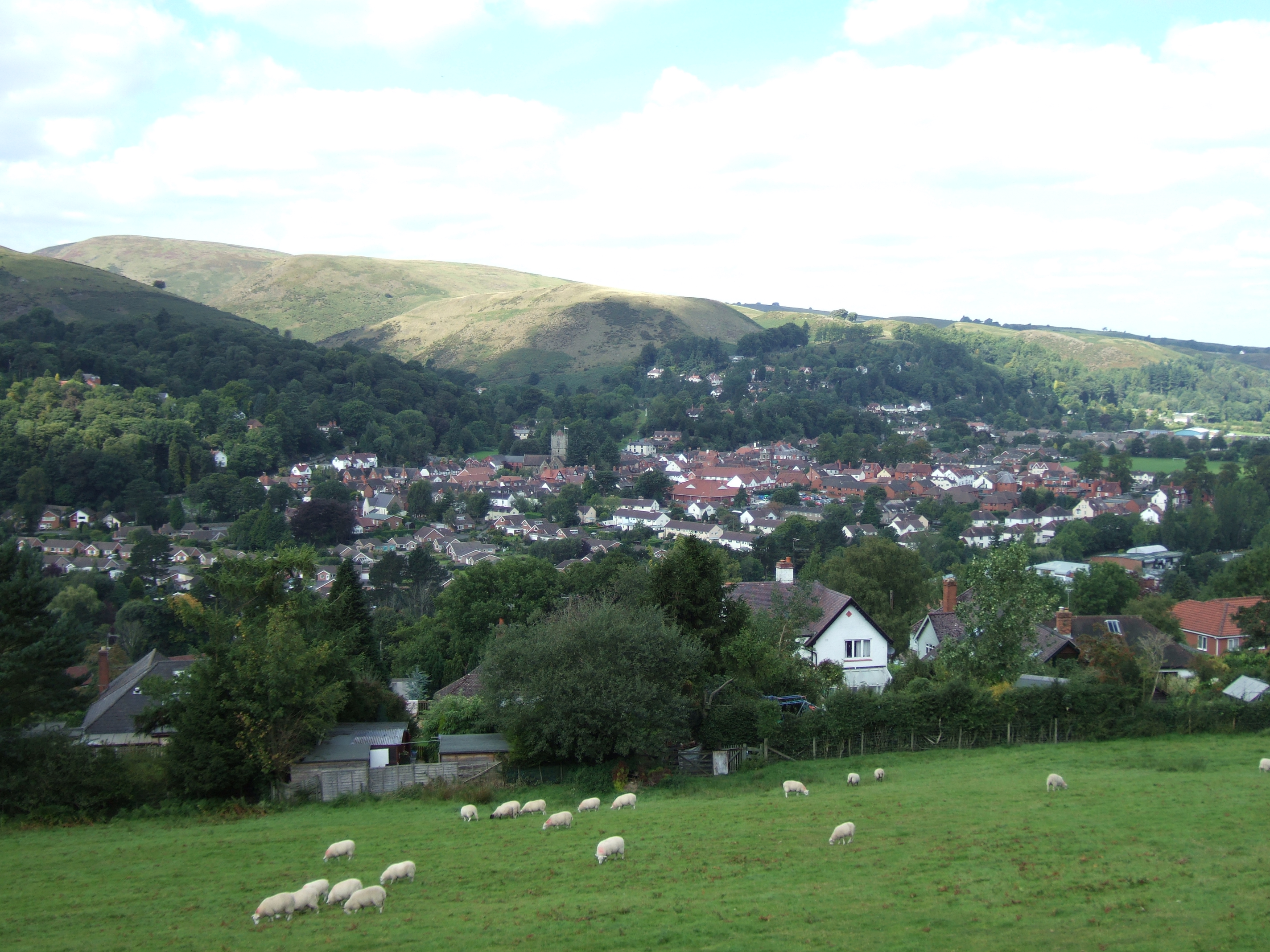
- Church Stretton viewed from the Ragleth

- Location within Shropshire
- Population: 4,469
- OS grid reference: SO453937
  - London: 158 miles (254 km)
- Civil parish: Church Stretton
- Unitary authority: Shropshire
- Ceremonial county: Shropshire
- Region: West Midlands
- Country: England
- Sovereign state: United Kingdom
- Post town: CHURCH STRETTON
- Postcode district: SY6
- Dialling code: 01694
- Police: West Mercia
- Fire: Shropshire
- Ambulance: West Midlands
- UK Parliament: South Shropshire
- Website: churchstretton.co.uk

Church Stretton is a market town and civil parish in south Shropshire, England, 13 miles (21 km) south of Shrewsbury and 15 miles (24 km) north of Ludlow. The population of the parish as a whole in 2024 was given by ONS as 4,469.

The town was nicknamed Little Switzerland in the late Victorian and Edwardian period for its landscape, and became a health resort. The local geology includes some of the oldest rocks in England and a notable fault is named after the town.

Church Stretton is in the Shropshire Hills Area of Outstanding Natural Beauty.

== History ==
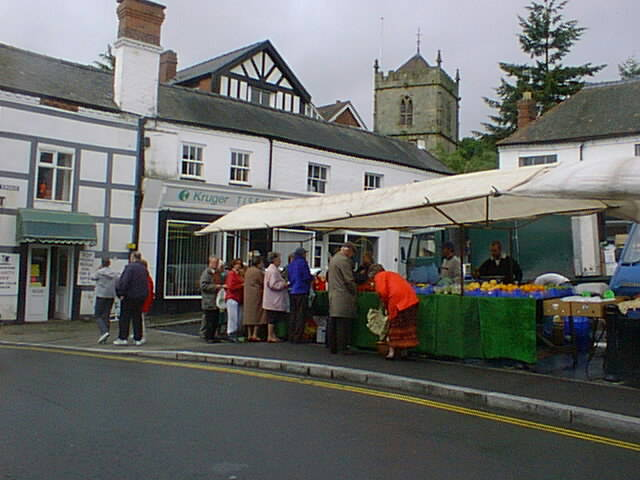
Market on High Street, which has been held in the town since 1214; in the background is the tower of St Laurence's Church

People have lived in the Stretton Gap (or Dale) for thousands of years; an Iron Age hillfort on Caer Caradoc overlooks the town. The name "Stretton" is derived from the Old English words stræt meaning "Roman road" and tun meaning "settlement"; a Roman road, Watling Street runs through the Stretton Gap, though the town (and adjacent settlements) were not historically located on this road – during the "Dark Ages" the settlements grew a short distance away from the old thoroughfare, for defensive purposes. Today the modern A49 road, which was constructed on its current alignment through the Stretton Gap in the late 1930s, runs along a similar course to the Roman Road. The Roman road was historically known as Botte Street.

The settlements of Little Stretton, Church Stretton and All Stretton (until the late 19th century regarded as separate townships) formed the manor of Stretton or Stretton-en-le-Dale. The Domesday Book of 1086 recorded 35 households and a mill in the manor. Church Stretton became the largest of the settlements, with the manor's parish church and market located there, and being where Bristol Road had a junction with the road to Much Wenlock and the Burway – a route over the Long Mynd. At the time of the Domesday Book, the manor came under the hundred of Culvestan, a Saxon hundred that was amalgamated during the reign of Henry I — the Strettons then came within the upper division of the hundred of Munslow.

The town was first granted a market charter by King John in 1214, for a weekly market on Wednesdays, but by 1253 the market day had changed to Tuesdays. In 1337 a new charter was granted by Edward III and it authorised a weekly market to be held on Thursdays. The market is still held every Thursday, in the square on the High Street, which has been the town's market place since the 13th century. Much of the town was destroyed by fire in 1593 and many of the present half timbered buildings in the town centre date from the time of the rebuilding.

The High Street was for many centuries known instead as the Bristol Road, being the road from Shrewsbury to Bristol. It was once a much wider street within the town, with the churchyard of St Laurence bordering directly onto the street. Over time buildings were erected on the street, in a similar fashion to other English market towns, such as in Ludlow. The High Street, which is a narrow street, is effectively only the eastern side of the original Bristol Road thoroughfare through the town. It was made more open when the old market hall was demolished to form the present town square.

=== 18th century ===
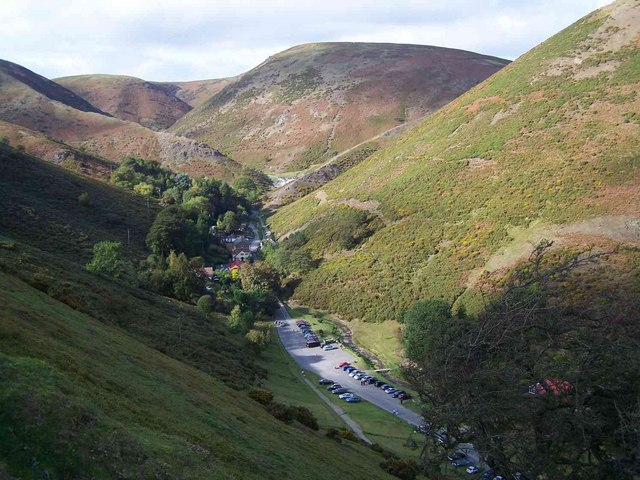
Carding Mill Valley, named after the textile mill there, now a notable tourist spot

==== Carding Mill Valley ====
Historically the town was known for its textiles, using the abundant local wool, and a notable location for this industry was Carding Mill Valley (grid reference SO442945). The carding mill there was built in the eighteenth century, and named after a stage in making cloth, the three stages being carding, spinning and weaving. Carding would have been done by children, and involved using a hand-card that removed and untangled short fibres from the mass of raw material. The cards were wooden blocks with handles and covered in metal spikes, which were angled (to make it easier to untangle) and set in leather. When untangled, the material would be spun, and then woven into the final product.

The carding mill closed and was demolished at the beginning of the twentieth century, although the adjacent factory building remains in the valley today. The valley it is in took the name "Carding Mill Valley", and is now a tourist attraction and well-known starting location for walkers, being at the heart of the Long Mynd range. Those who follow the valley to its summit are greeted by the sight of the Lightspout waterfall. The valley is owned (along with the entire hill range) by the National Trust, who have a visitor centre there. The mill building itself has been converted into flats and a number of other private houses exist near it and the visitor centre, forming a small settlement in the valley. Vehicles (and therefore most visitors) have to drive up from the town, from Shrewsbury Road, to access the valley.

Cars may drive as far as the car park situated about a mile up the valley. This car park was at one time an open-air swimming pool. A sign indicating water depth still stands in its original position.

=== Victorian and Edwardian times ===
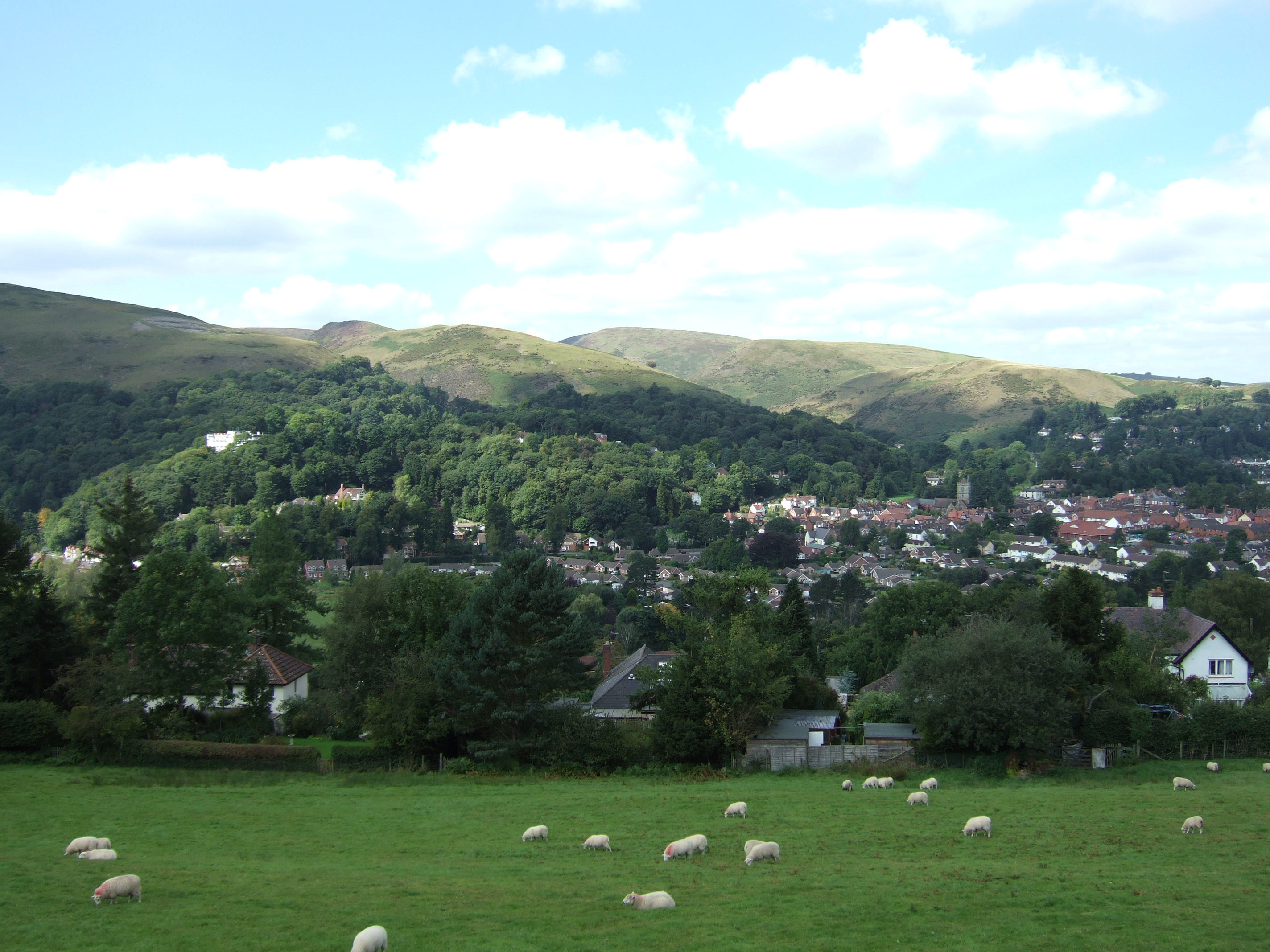
Hills and woodland to the west/southwest of the town, as seen from the slope of the Ragleth hill. The Edwardian Long Mynd Hotel is the large, white building amongst the woodland to the left

Church Stretton railway station opened on 20 April 1852 as part of the newly created Shrewsbury and Hereford Railway. It was originally to the north of (what is now known as) Sandford Avenue and the old station building still remains, but is no longer in railway use. Sandford Avenue had been for centuries called Lake Lane and became Station Road with the arrival of the railway in the town, before becoming Sandford Avenue in 1884.

Church Stretton was nicknamed "Little Switzerland" in late-Victorian and Edwardian times, because of its surroundings and the way many houses hug the hillside.

In 1914 the railway station was moved just to the south of the Sandford Avenue road bridge, where it continues to the present day. New railway station buildings were built, but these were demolished in 1970, the station having become unstaffed in 1967.

Local property developer Ralph Beaumont Benson (1862–1911), who lived at Lutwyche Hall in nearby Easthope, is responsible for the naming of Easthope Road, Essex Road (after his wife), Beaumont Road and Lutwyche Road, all in the centre of the town and part of the town's expansion in the early twentieth century.

==== Longmynd Hotel ====
The Longmynd Hotel on Cunnery Road opened in 1901, originally as "The Hydropathic Hotel" (or "the Hydro"), at a time when the town was popular as a spa. Today it continues as a hotel and has a number of features and activities in its woodland grounds; it is also a wedding and conference venue. In 2012 it was sold by the local Chapman family (who ran it since 1977) to 'HF Holidays', a national company. It is no longer a hotel but a hostel and used exclusively by HF members.

=== Mid-twentieth century ===
During and just after the Second World War, from 1940 to 1946, St Dunstan's (now Blind Veterans UK) was based in the town. The charitable service (for blinded armed forces personnel) was moved from Sussex as Church Stretton was thought to be a safe location. Some 700 people were trained during this period in Church Stretton in an industrial training centre set up at a malthouse in Sandford Avenue. The Long Mynd Hotel, the Denehurst Hotel, the Brockhurst Estate and Tiger Hall were the most notable buildings taken over by St Dunstan's in the town. A residential cul-de-sac is named St Dunstan's Close in recognition of the charity's place in the town's history. The Long Mynd was considered to be a potential landing place for German parachutists, although Church Stretton avoided the aerial bombing of the war; the only death recorded in the district by the Commonwealth War Graves Commission of a civilian war casualty was of a firewatcher from Manchester who died while being treated at the St Dunstan's Hospital.

=== Late 20th century ===
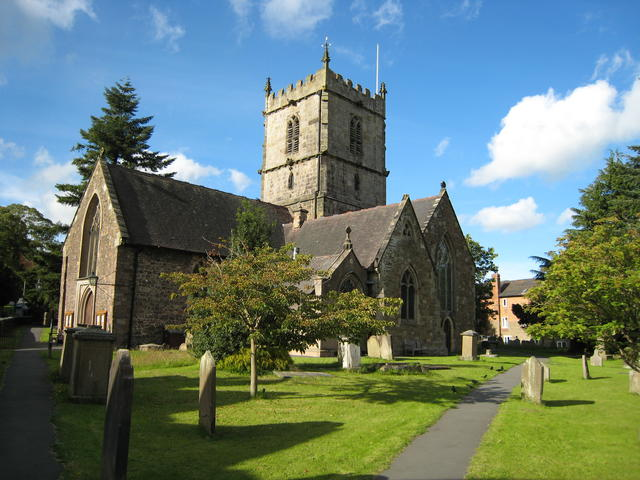
St Laurence's Church, a largely Norman structure, but with Saxon origins

A small market hall stood on the High Street but was demolished in July 1963 and the site has become a town square, and is still used to hold markets on. The first market hall – a timber-framed construction – was built in 1617; this was replaced by the second market hall (called the Town Hall) in 1839, which was a stone and red-brick construction, designed by Edward Haycock.

The Silvester Horne Institute was founded in 1915-16 in memory of the Rev C Silvester Horne. It was extended and refurbished in 2011 and is the town's main meeting place for societies, polling, public meetings and exhibitions. Additionally there is the Mayfair Community Centre on Easthope Road and the St Laurence's Parish Hall on Church Street.

In recent years volunteer members of the Community Group have transformed Church Stretton into the Town of Flags: thanks to local grants they have purchased over 120 flags – English, Union and foreign – and these are regularly flown in the town centre on special occasions throughout the year.

=== Population ===
At the 2011 census, the parish's population was 4,671. The population of Church Stretton parish (including All Stretton, Little Stretton and Minton) was recorded in official UK censuses as being:

| Year | Population |
|---|---|
| 1801 | 924 |
| 1811 | 944 |
| 1821 | 1,226 |
| 1831 | 1,302 |
| 1841 | 1,604 |
| 1851 | 1,676 |
| 1861 | 1,695 |
| 1871 | 1,756 |
| 1881 | 1,683 |
| 1891 | 1,707 |
| 1901 | 1,749 |

| Year | Population |
|---|---|
| 1911 | 2,435 |
| 1921 | 2,652 |
| 1931 | 2,637 |
| 1941 | no census (war) |
| 1951 | 3,513 |
| 1961 | 3,640 |
| 1971 | 3,514 |
| 1981 | 3,945 |
| 1991 | 4,184 |
| 2001 | 4,186 |
| 2011 | 4,671 |

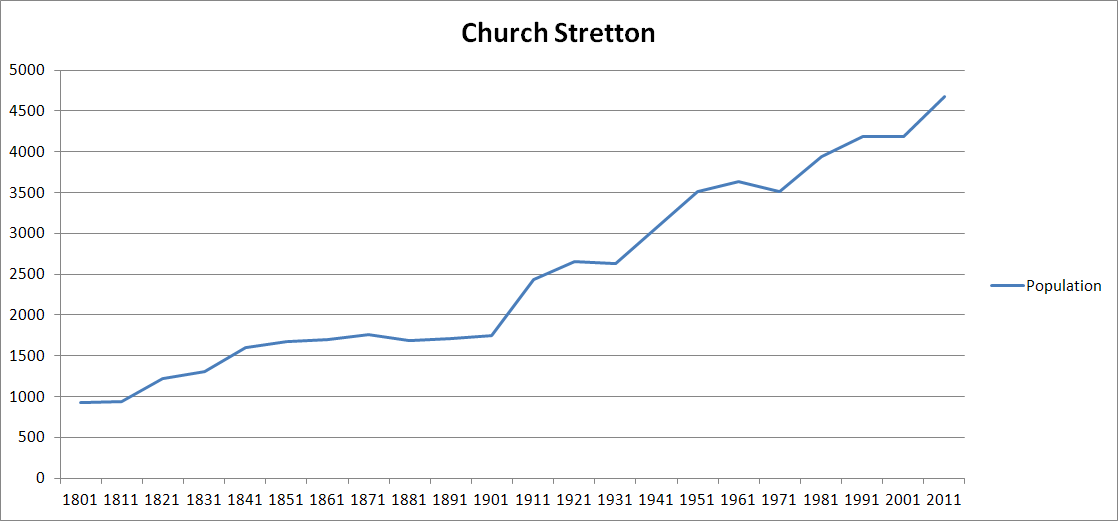
Graph showing the parish's population since 1801.

The population remained steady between 1841 and 1901, but then boomed in the first two decades of the 20th century as the town became a desirable rural retreat. Another spate of growth occurred in the period 1931–1951. Since then there has been unremarkable growth, with some expansion in the 1970s and '80s and more recently in the 2000s. The latest figure from ONS of 4469 for 2024 shows a slight decline.

== Geography ==
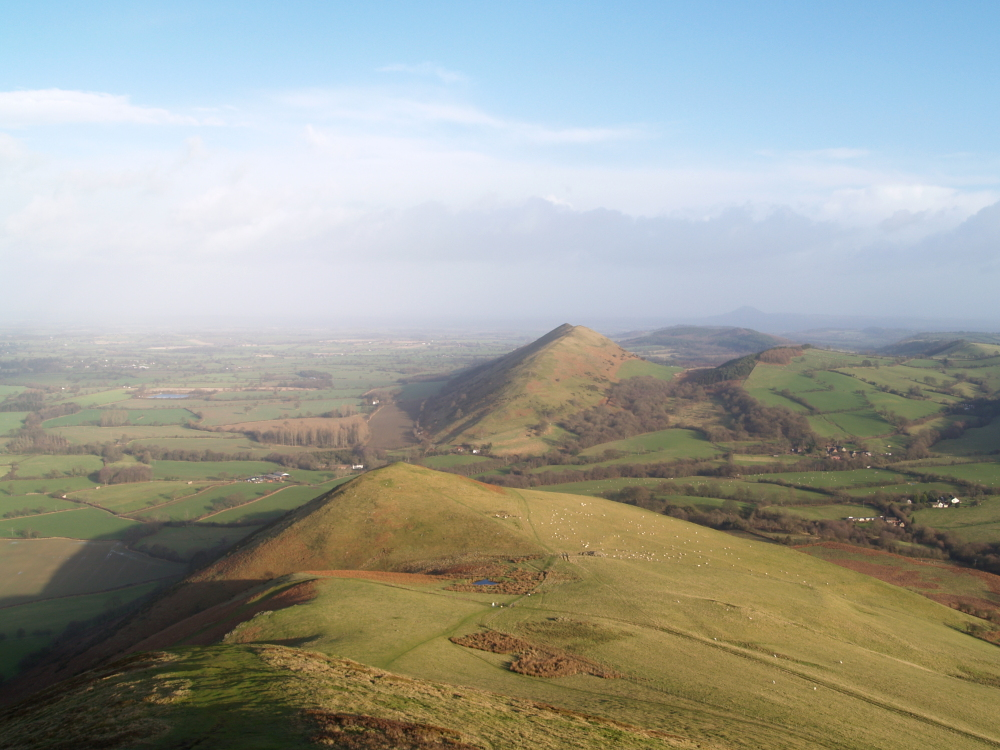
View of the Lawley hill (looking north) from the top of Caer Caradoc

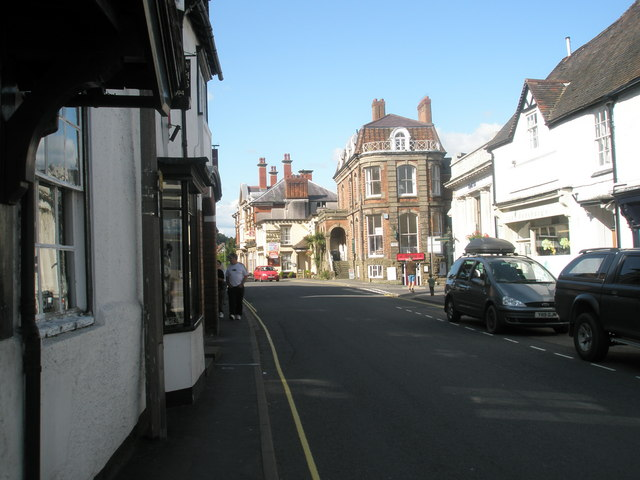
High Street, near the junction with Sandford Avenue. The building in the centre was once the town's main hotel, until the 1960s.

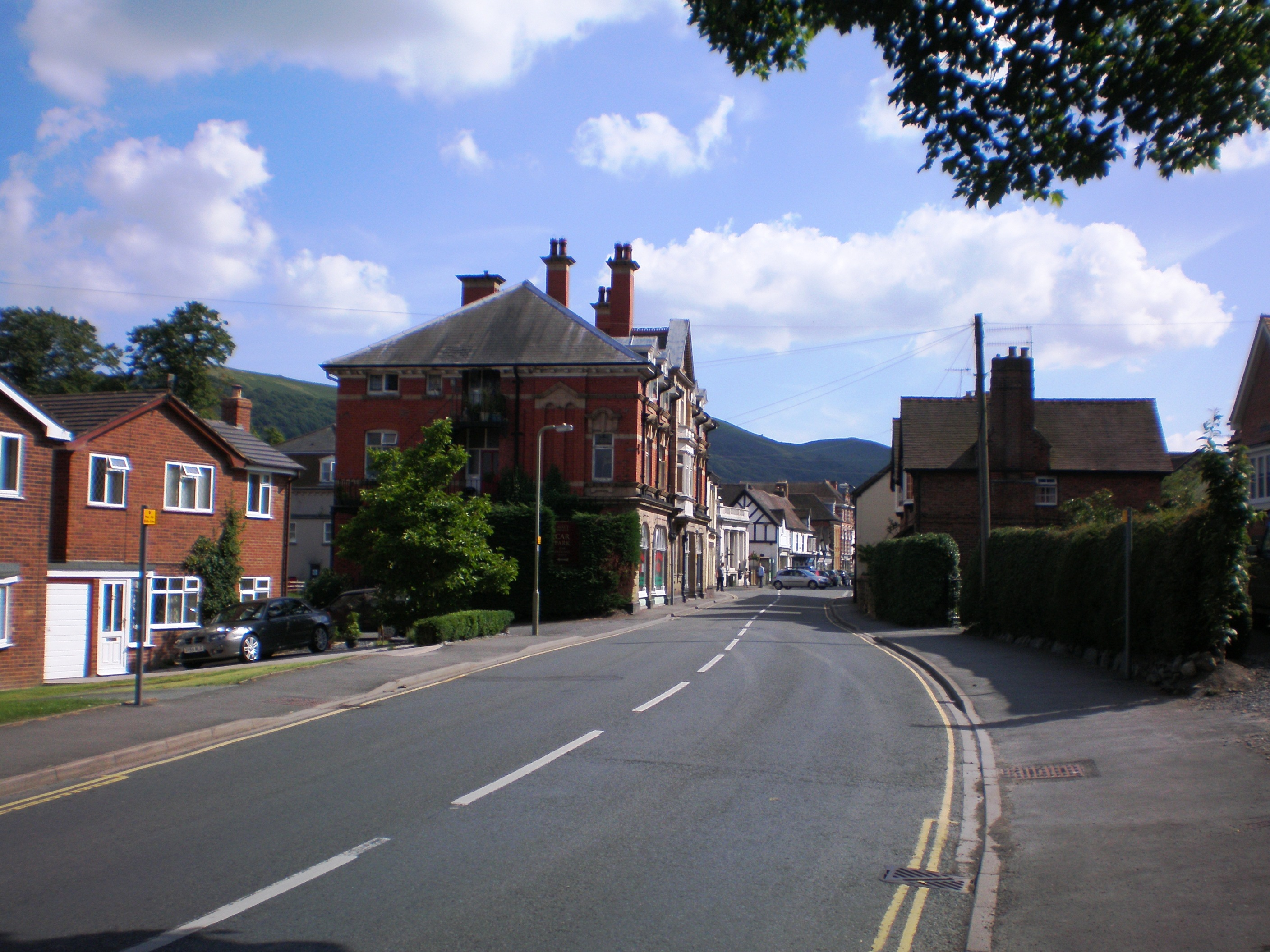
Shrewsbury Road (the B5477), looking south towards the town centre

Church Stretton is located approximately 13 miles (21 km) south of Shropshire's county town, Shrewsbury. The town is dominated by the surrounding hills, including the huge Long Mynd massif to the west, and Caer Caradoc and the adjacent hills (Hazler, Ragleth, et al.) to the east.

Church Stretton effectively lies at a saddle point – the railway station lies roughly at this position, which is at 614 feet (187 m) above sea level. The High Street through the town centre runs at an elevation of 636 feet. Because of its position at a saddle point, water drains away from the town in two directions – towards the north (to the Cound and then the Severn) and towards the south (to the Onny and then the Teme) – roughly Sandford Avenue in the town centre forms the watershed.

Most of the town centre and large parts of the town both to the east and to the west of the A49, including Carding Mill Valley, are included in the Church Stretton Conservation Area. The Conservation Area contains all of the town's listed buildings and smaller structures, approximately 40 in total. St Laurence's Church is Grade I listed.

=== Localities ===
The historic core of the town lies around the parish church and along the High Street. With the building of the railway line and station in 1852, the town began to grow towards the new station, along what is today Sandford Avenue. Since the first half of the 20th century the two main streets of the town centre are the High Street and Sandford Avenue. In the later decades of the 20th century a number of shops on the southern end of High Street changed use to restaurants or purely residential, as Sandford Avenue became the pre-eminent shopping street. The B5477 takes the name Shrewsbury Road north from the town centre, High Street within the town centre, and Ludlow Road south of there.

Cunnery is a hillside and collection of houses to the west of the town centre and includes the Long Mynd Hotel. World's End is where the Ludlow Road curves round the foot of the hillside to the south of the Long Mynd Hotel. To the north of the town centre is an area called Ashbrook; here the Carding Mill Valley meets the town, with the stream (known as the Ashbrook as it runs through the town) running between the town's two main recreation fields (named Russell's Meadow and Richard Robinson Field). Two other notable areas of public parkland are Rectory Wood and Field, situated to the west of the town centre off Church Street, and the town's formal park between the A49 and the railway line, which is managed by the town council and includes tennis courts and a bowling green.

On the eastern side of the A49 road are three named areas: Battle Field, Snatchfield and Hazler. On Hazler Hill is a transmitter for local radio (BBC Radio Shropshire broadcast from here on 90FM). Battle Field is named for the legend that Caer Caradoc was the site of the last stand of Caractacus against the Roman legions during the Roman conquest of Britain, and that after the battle he hid in the cave near its summit.

=== All Stretton and Little Stretton ===
The villages of All Stretton and Little Stretton remain separate settlements to Church Stretton. The B5477 connects the three settlements, with Church Stretton roughly midway between – All Stretton is 1.0 mile (1.6 km) north of the centre of Church Stretton, whilst Little Stretton is 1.3 miles (2.1 km) south. Although there is some ribbon development along the B5477, the three settlements are not joined, although the gap between the nearest buildings of All Stretton and Church Stretton is a mere 170 metres (560 ft) and the road signs (on the B5477) welcoming people into those two settlements lie back-to-back. The B5477 continues as Shrewsbury Road as it passes through All Stretton and likewise continues as Ludlow Road as it passes through Little Stretton. The three settlements are sometimes known collectively as "the Strettons", a name also given to the wider area including the surrounding hills.

== Governance ==
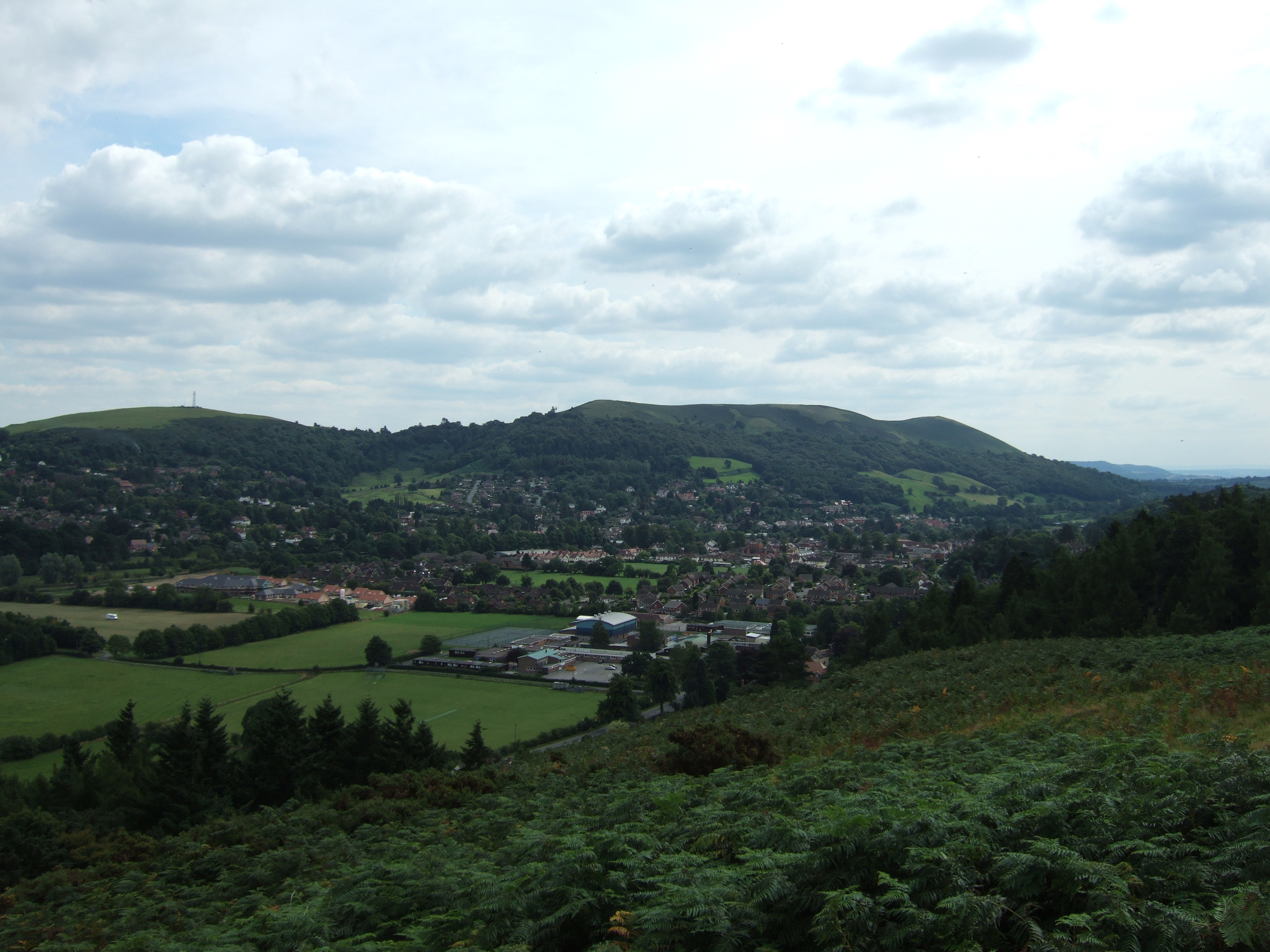
Church Stretton viewed from Nover's Hill; the Hazler and Ragleth hills are behind

=== Parish and town council ===
The town is located within the civil parish of Church Stretton, and is administered by a parish council called Church Stretton Town council. The parish (and the town council) also cover the neighbouring villages of All Stretton, Little Stretton, and the hamlets of Minton and Hamperley, and other outlying settlements including Botvyle and part of Marshbrook. The parish has an area of 3,132 hectares (7,740 acres) and is divided into four wards: Church Stretton North (represented by four councillors on the town council), Church Stretton South (represented by five councillors), All Stretton and Little Stretton (each represented by two councillors). Between 1966 and 2002, the parish council was not termed a town council and there was no mayor, a situation which was remedied by a resolution of the council in May 2001.

Sometimes the parish is referred to as "Church Stretton and Little Stretton"; the present-day parish was formed by the addition of the former Little Stretton parish and part of All Stretton parish (the remainder still exists as a separate parish). This is effectively a return to the situation before 1899, when the old civil parish of Church Stretton was split into three, though the modern parish does not include that part of All Stretton parish that was not transferred in 1934.

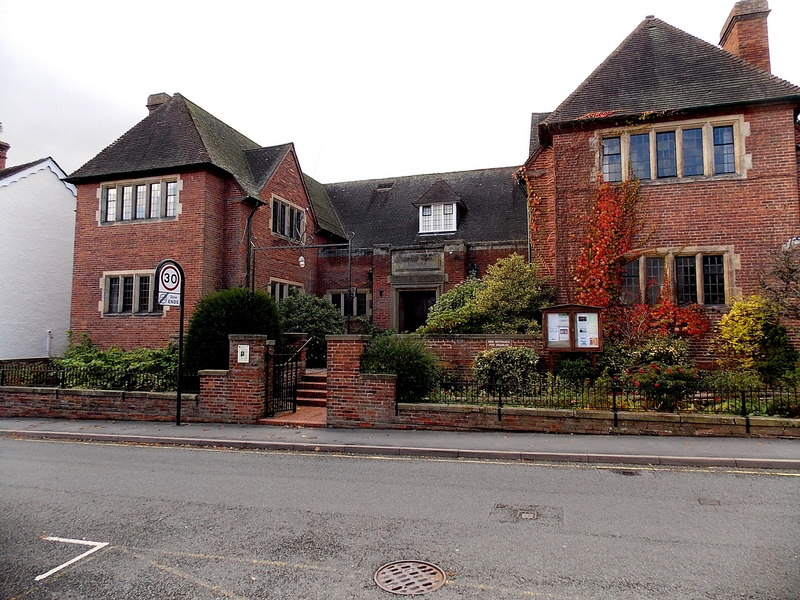
Silvester Horne Institute, High Street: used for public gatherings and meetings of the town council

The Town Council have its offices at 60 High Street and hold its meetings at the nearby Silvester Horne Institute, also on High Street.

==== Mayors ====
Below is a complete list of mayors of Church Stretton. Formally the mayor of a town council is a Town Mayor. One of the town councillors is elected by the council (at the 'Annual Meeting' in May) as jointly chairman and Town Mayor. Although Church Stretton's parish council became a town council in 2002, the title of Town Mayor was not bestowed upon the chairman until 2004.

| Term | Chairman and Town Mayor | Ward | Note |
|---|---|---|---|
| 2003–2006 | Leslie McIntyre | All Stretton | The first Town Mayor, from 2004 |
| 2006–2007 | Beryl Smith | Church Stretton South | |
| 2007–2012 | Bob Welch | Church Stretton North | |
| 2012–2013 | Tom Beaumont | Church Stretton North | |
| 2013–2015 | Michael Braid | Church Stretton North | |
| 2015– | Michael Walker | Little Stretton | |

=== Local government ===
Church Stretton was an ancient parish. When elected parish and district councils were created in 1894 it was given a parish council and included in the Church Stretton Rural District. The parish was removed from the rural district in 1899 to become its own urban district. It was downgraded to a rural parish again in 1966, becoming part of Ludlow Rural District (the Church Stretton Rural District had already been abolished in 1934). The Urban District Council was based at offices on Beaumont Road, where Beaumont Court now is. In 1974 the system of urban and rural districts was replaced and the town came under South Shropshire non-metropolitan district and Shropshire non-metropolitan county. The most recent change in local government occurred in 2009 when South Shropshire District Council and the other districts in the county were abolished and Shropshire County Council took over their functions, making it a unitary authority; the county council changed its name to Shropshire Council at the same time.

Church Stretton is part of the Shropshire Council electoral division (or ward) of 'Church Stretton and Craven Arms'. The population of this ward at the 2011 Census was 8,936. In the 2009 council elections the electorate of this ward returned two councillors, both Conservative.

=== Member of Parliament ===
On a national level, Church Stretton is located within the South Shropshire constituency, and the current Member of Parliament ("MP") for that constituency is Stuart Anderson, a Conservative, since the 2024 general election.

== Geology ==
The local geology is complex; the area lies astride the Church Stretton Fault and atop some of the oldest rocks in England – formed over 560 million years ago. On 2 April 1990, another nearby fault – the Pontesford-Linley Fault – registered an earthquake with a magnitude of 5.1 on the Richter scale, known as the Bishop's Castle earthquake. The area also plays a part in the history of geology, Comley Quarry is about 2.5 miles (4 km) from the town and the first site in the British Isles where trilobites were recorded, and gave its name to a regional subdivision of the Cambrian period.

== Transport ==
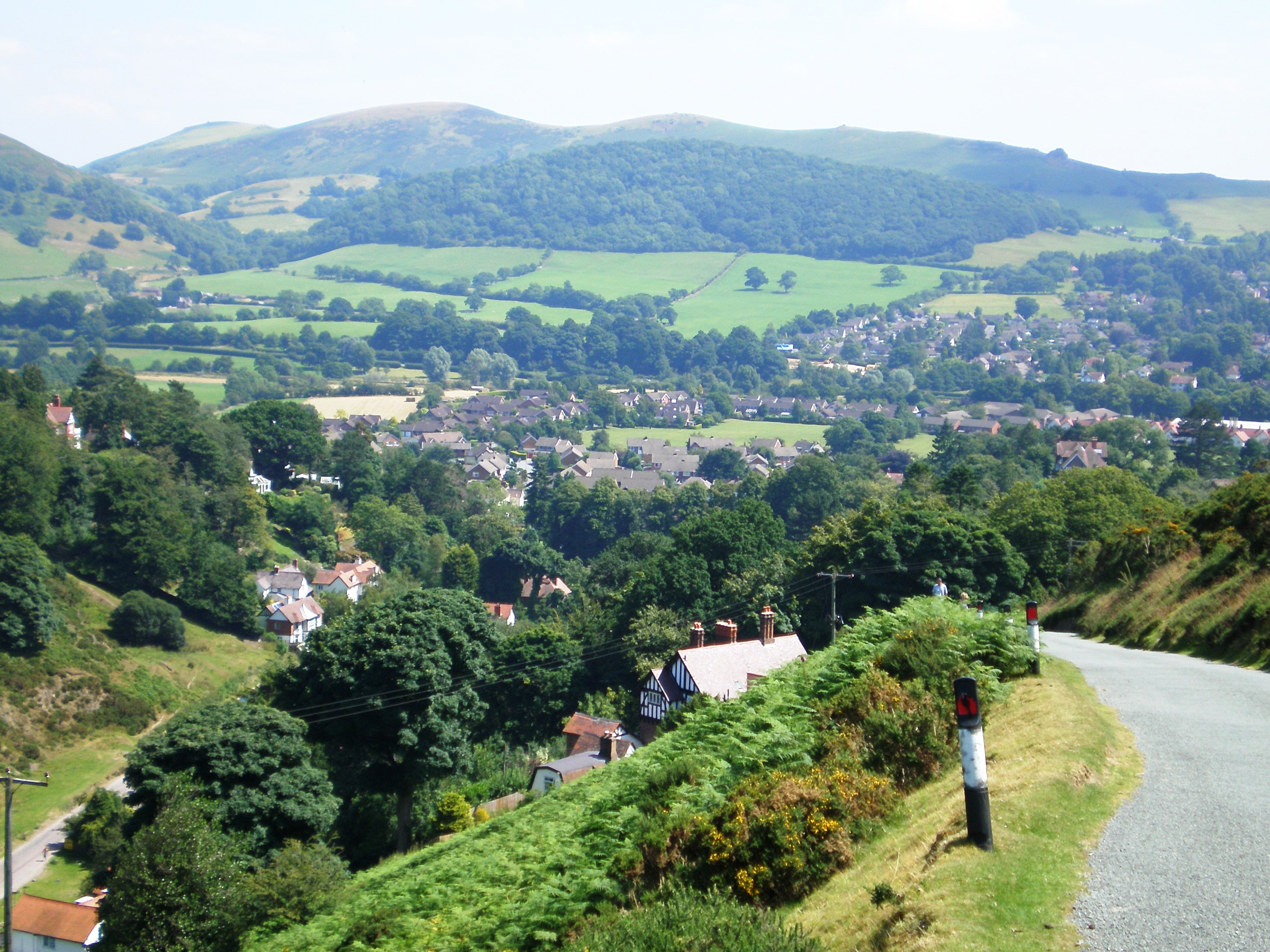
The northern parts of the town, from the Burway; the entrance to Carding Mill Valley is below on the left

=== Roads ===
The A49, a primary route and trunk road, runs through the Stretton Gap, connecting Shrewsbury to the north with Ludlow and Hereford to the south. The B5477 runs through the villages of All Stretton and Little Stretton, as well as the historic core and town centre of Church Stretton. The B4371 starts at the B5477 in the town centre and heads east, crosses over a crossroads junction with the A49, then up to Hazler and on towards Much Wenlock. The B4371 in the town, on both sides of the A49, is known as Sandford Avenue and is partially lined with lime trees.

The B5477 had been the northern section of the B4370, which was renumbered in 2004; this renumbering to B5477 is anomalous in two ways: the number does not comply with the Great Britain road numbering scheme (it is out-of-zone) and was already (and remains) in use in Wallasey.

==== The Burway ====
The Burway is an ancient route which leads up from the town to the plateau on the Long Mynd. It is Shropshire's highest public road, reaching 492 metres (1,614 ft) above sea level and passing close to the highest point of the Long Mynd, called Pole Bank (516 m). Running along the plateau of the Long Mynd is another ancient route called the Portway, though not all of this is open to motor traffic. The Burway is a through route, allowing traffic (though not goods vehicles, caravans or similar) to cross over the Long Mynd westwards to Ratlinghope or Asterton (the route splits into two at Boiling Well).

In winter, deep snow sometimes makes the Burway impassable. In 2015, snow gates were installed at various points of access onto the Long Mynd to deter motorists from using the routes in wintry conditions. The gliding club at the southern end of the Long Mynd can be accessed via the Burway from either Asterton or Church Stretton. The part of the road within the town is called Burway Road and begins at the crossroads in the town centre, where the B5477 and B4371 meet.

=== Railway ===
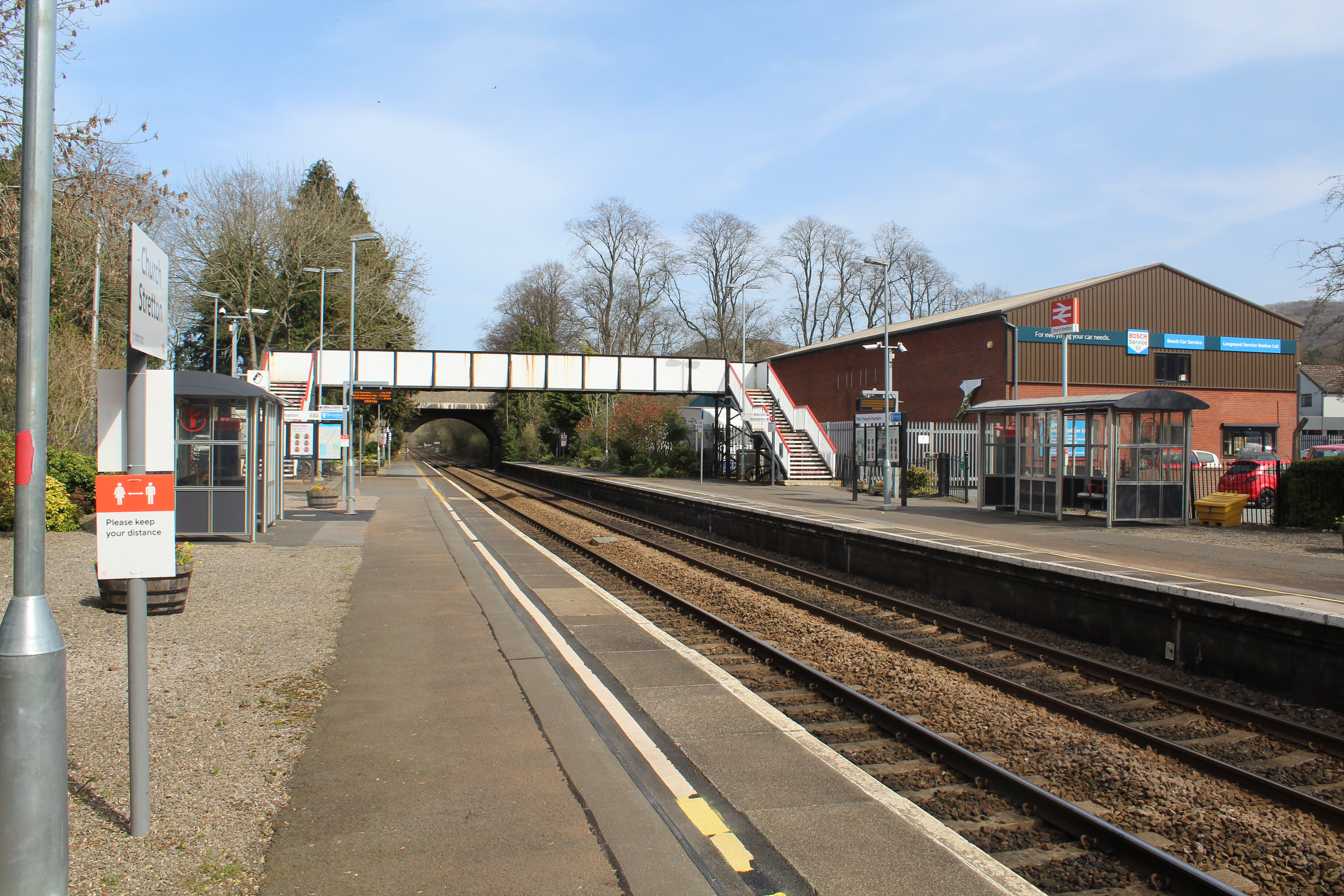
A view of the station, looking north towards Shrewsbury

The Welsh Marches Line runs through the town parallel to, and west of, the A49 road. The town's station is off Sandford Avenue, just east of the town centre, near to the junction of the A49 and B4371.

The railway was built originally as the Shrewsbury and Hereford Railway in 1852. Trains on the Heart of Wales Line also call at the station. Today, there are direct train services to Shrewsbury, Chester, Holyhead, Crewe, Manchester, Ludlow, Hereford, Newport, Cardiff and Swansea. The station has a large number of passengers using it, considering the town's population; it is the eighth busiest station in Shropshire (2017-18 figures).

=== Buses ===
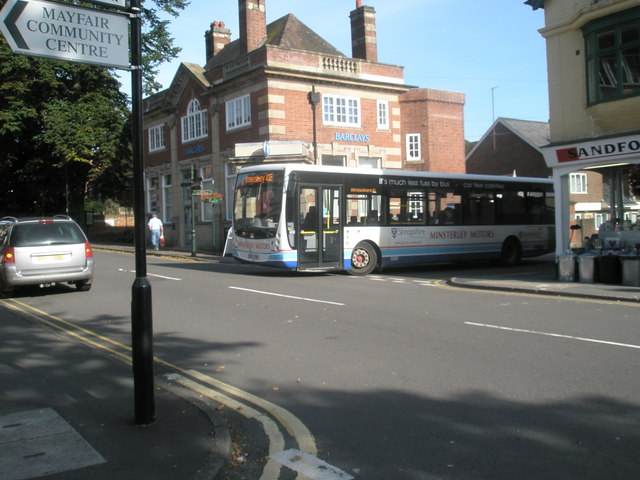
A Minsterley Motors bus turning off Beaumont Road onto Sandford Avenue

The town is served by the 435 bus route, which runs between Shrewsbury and Ludlow; it is operated by Minsterley Motors Monday-Saturday. This connects the town with All Stretton, Dorrington and Condover towards Shrewsbury, and Little Stretton, Craven Arms and Bromfield towards Ludlow.

In addition, there are two Shropshire Hills Shuttles services that operate at weekends and on Bank Holidays during the spring and summer. One route runs over the Long Mynd to Ratlinghope and Bridges, Stiperstones, Habberley, Pulverbatch, Minsterley and Pontesbury. The other route, called the Wenlock Wanderer, runs to Much Wenlock via Little Stretton, Marshbrook, Acton Scott, Ticklerton and then along the B4371 which runs along the top of the Wenlock Edge to the market town of Much Wenlock.

All bus services call at Beaumont Road in the town centre. The Shuttles services also both call at Carding Mill Valley.

=== Cycling ===
Regional Cycle Route 32/33 runs through the town, on its way from Shrewsbury to Craven Arms. The route avoids cycling along the busy A49 main road, with the exception of a stretch north of Craven Arms. The area is popular with mountain bikers, due to the number of bridleways and country lanes in the hilly countryside.

== Economy ==
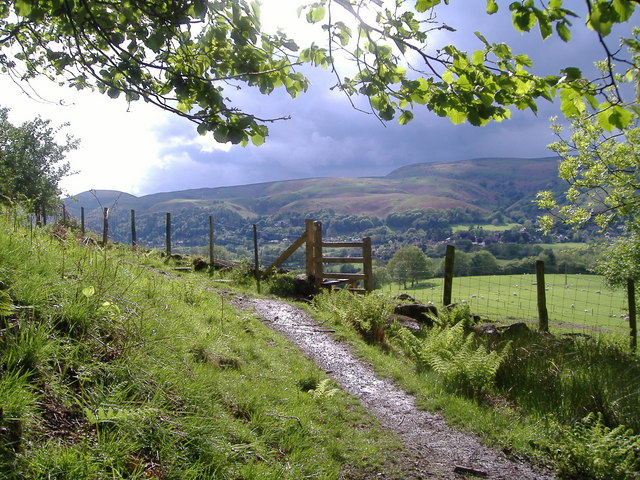
A stile and footpath with view of the Long Mynd; tourism based on the surrounding natural landscape has been important for the town's economy since the late 19th century

The mineral water extraction and bottling plant on Shrewsbury Road (known locally as the 'Pop Works'), has been operating since 1883; since 2004 it has provided Princes with mineral water. It is a notable local employer as is the polymer laboratories off Essex Road, currently owned by Agilent Technologies (until 2009 by Varian). There is a designated light industrial area between the A49 and the railway line, known as Crossways, with a number of businesses, many of which are in the motoring trade, including an independent petrol/diesel filling station.

The town benefits from tourism, which is a growth industry in the area, as well as attracting local trade. A 2011 survey showed that the town had some 50 retail outlets, 44 of which are independently owned, with a diverse range of shop types. These included two butchers, several outdoor activities shops, a baker, a delicatessen, several clothes and shoe shops, three banks, and two supermarkets (Co-op and Spar). There is a large antiques market, situated in a former malthouse on the corner of Sandford Avenue and Easthope Road. There are four pubs,^{a} as well as a number of cafes and small restaurants. In June 2011 the town was officially declared to be a "Fairtrade Town" with 34 businesses selling fair trade products. There is a small art gallery in the former hotel on the corner of Shrewsbury Road and Sandford Avenue. The town also has a number of professional services, such as solicitors, accountants and estate agents, confirming its status as a local centre of business.

The town continues to benefit from its reputation as a spa town, and a desirable place to live, especially in retirement. House prices are above the county average and have seen similar increases in recent times to other spa towns in the UK.

The 2001 census recorded the parish's employment rate at 54.2%, whilst unemployment was at 1.9% (both are percentages of residents aged 16–74), and 18.7% of all residents were retired. The largest sector of employment was "wholesale and retail trade, and repair of motor vehicles" with 16.7% of all employment in that sector.

== Culture and sport ==
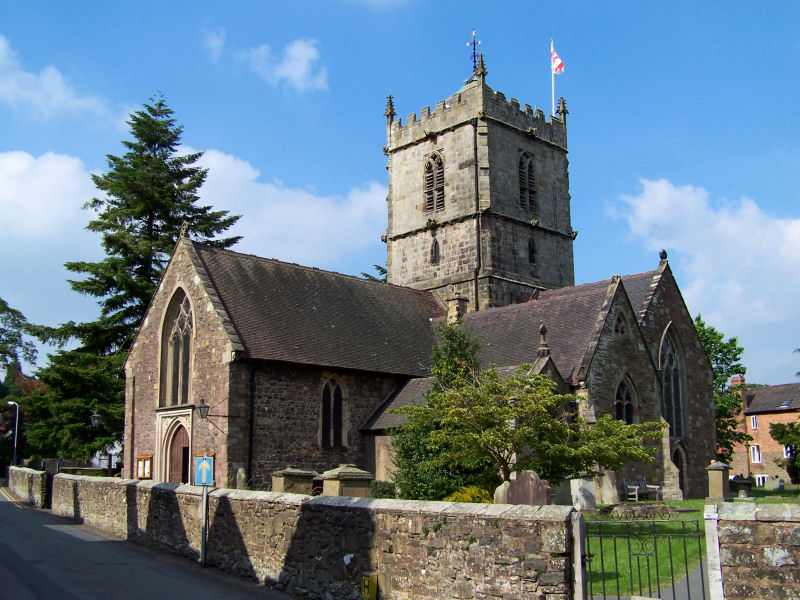
St Laurence's Church – the town's ancient parish church, which distinguished the town from the two neighbouring settlements called Stretton, giving the town its "Church" affix

The novelist Henry Kingsley (1830–1876) wrote "Stretton" based around this area, and Oliver Sandys' book, "Quaint Place" is set in Church Stretton. Mary Webb's works also made reference to the town, under the name "Shepwardine". The Lone Pine Club series of children's books by Malcolm Saville is also partly set in the area.

Church Stretton is a major centre for the sport of archery, and there is also a gliding air field and station atop the Long Mynd, owned by the Midland Gliding Club. As well as gliding, the activities of paragliding, hang gliding and similar aerial pursuits take place from the Long Mynd. Church Stretton became a Walkers Are Welcome town in 2009, the first in the West Midlands, and its many well-maintained footpaths over the Long Mynd and the Stretton Hills help make it a major walking centre for Shropshire. In the town itself, sports facilities are provided adjacent to the schools, just off Shrewsbury Road, which include a swimming pool and a recently opened 4 court sports and leisure centre, and the town council provide facilities (such as a BMX facility, crazy golf, hard tennis courts, a bowling green and a croquet pitch) at the town park (situated between the A49 and the railway).

=== Summer festival ===
In recent times, on a June Saturday the town holds a summer festival ("Summerfest"), organised by volunteers and the town's chamber of trade. The town centre's streets and car parks are closed to traffic, as stalls, entertainment and activities take place throughout the town, including a classic car and steam rally. In the evening there is a concert in Rectory Field.

=== Churches ===
The town has four churches. In the centre of the town is the historic parish church dedicated to Lawrence of Rome, situated on the corner of Churchway and Church Street, and with its own small graveyard surrounding it. (This graveyard was succeeded by a cemetery at the foot of Cunnery Road, which in turn has been replaced by one near Brockhurst.) It is the town's Church of England church and is one of three in the ecclesiastical parish of Church Stretton, along with the churches in All Stretton and Little Stretton (which were built around 1900). The parish is part of the Diocese of Hereford. The church's name is written either as "Lawrence" or "Laurence", though the latter is used more for the church itself. St Laurence's Church has a remnant of its Anglo-Saxon origins: a stone carved fertility symbol called a Sheela na gig.

The other three churches in the town are: the United Reformed Church on Ludlow Road; a Roman Catholic church dedicated to St Milburga (a local saint), situated on the corner of Sandford Avenue and Watling Street; and a Methodist church situated on the corner of Crossways and Watling Street.

=== Golf course ===
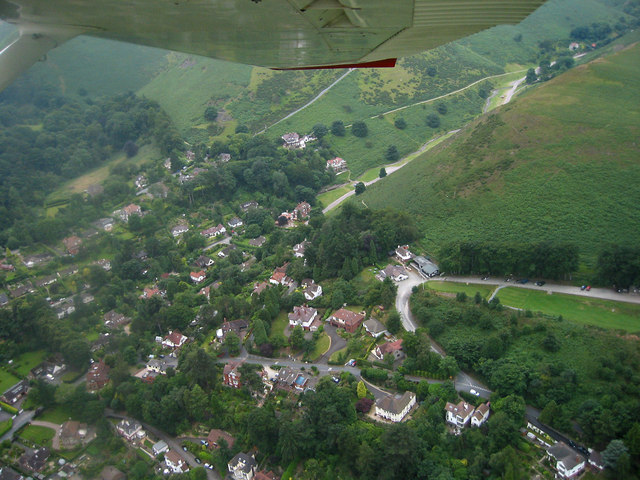
Aerial photo of part of the town in 2008, showing the entrance to Carding Mill Valley and the Golf Club's clubhouse

There is an 18-hole golf course about a km from the town centre, the Church Stretton Golf Club. The course is 5,030 yards long and has a par of 66. It is one of the highest golf courses in the country, being located on the side of the Long Mynd hill range (the course is situated on the slopes of Stanyeld Hill and Bodbury Hill). The clubhouse is at approximately 230 m (755 ft) above sea level and the hilly links course rises up to around 375 m (1,230 ft). Apart from the clubhouse, putting green and first hole, the course is situated on common land owned by the National Trust (who own most of the Long Mynd upland area).

The town's golf course is the oldest 18-hole course in Shropshire, with the club starting in 1898 and the final holes being completed around 1904. The course was primarily designed by John (Jack) Morris and James Hepburn. James Braid and Harry Vardon later made changes to the course.

Open Champions James Braid, Harry Vardon and J. H. Taylor (together referred to as the Great Triumvirate) all played at the course many times, albeit at different times, during the pre-World War I years of the club's existence.

=== Football ===
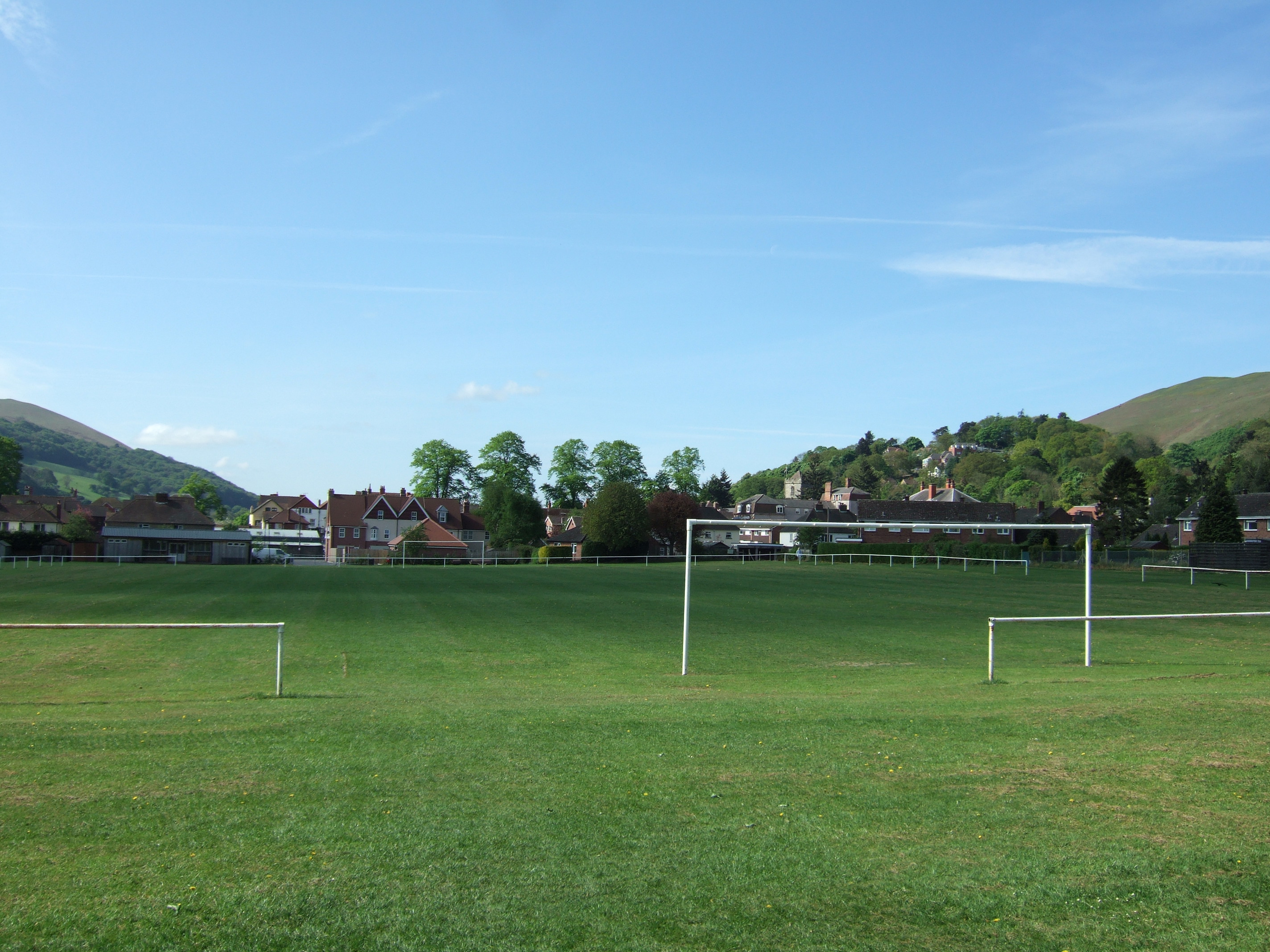
The town centre viewed across Russell's Meadow; the Long Mynd is on the right

Church Stretton Town F.C. (usually called simply "Stretton") is a football team who currently play in the West Midlands Regional League Division 2. Home games are played at Russell's Meadow, located near the centre of the town off Lutwyche Road (grid reference SO455939). The home kit is black and white (thick) vertical stripes.

There has been a football field at Russell's Meadow since the 1930s, though the pavilion moved (c. 1950s) from the other side of the Ashbrook to its present location near Lutwyche Road. There is a community project on-going to raise funds and then build a new pavilion at Russell's Meadow. In 2011 funding was secured from Sport England to improve the five existing football pitches and create two new training pitches, on both Russell's Meadow and neighbouring Robinson's Field. Russell's Meadow is also home to a separate football club for under-16s – the Church Stretton Magpies — and to Sunday league football. The home colours of both the Town and Magpies teams is black and white.

=== Cricket ===
During the summer, Russell's Meadow and its pavilion are used to play cricket. Church Stretton Cricket Club have a Saturday First XI playing in the Shropshire County Cricket League Division Five and a Friendly XI that play on Sundays against Shropshire teams and touring sides.

== Media ==
Local news and television programmes are provided by BBC West Midlands and ITV Central. Television signals are received from the Wrekin TV transmitter and one of the two relay transmitters (Hazler Hill and Whittingslow).

Local radio stations are BBC Radio Shropshire on 90.0 FM, Hits Radio Black Country & Shropshire on 103.1 FM, Capital North West & Wales 103.4 FM, and Greatest Hits Radio Black Country & Shropshire on 107.4 FM.

The town is served by the local newspaper, Shropshire Star.

== Public services ==
=== Education ===
Church Stretton has two state-funded schools: Church Stretton School, a secondary school with 750 pupils and a primary school (named "St Lawrence") with 210 pupils. The two schools neighbour one other and are situated just off Shrewsbury Road, on the northern edge of Church Stretton. The Council also operates a public library, on Church Street, situated in former, Victorian school buildings, which is also the town's tourist information centre and information point for Shropshire Council services.

One present day independent school, Brockhurst and Marlston House School in Berkshire, had origins partly in the Brockhurst School founded in Church Stretton as a boys' boarding prep school in 1884, which remained until it moved to Staffordshire in 1942.

=== Emergency services ===
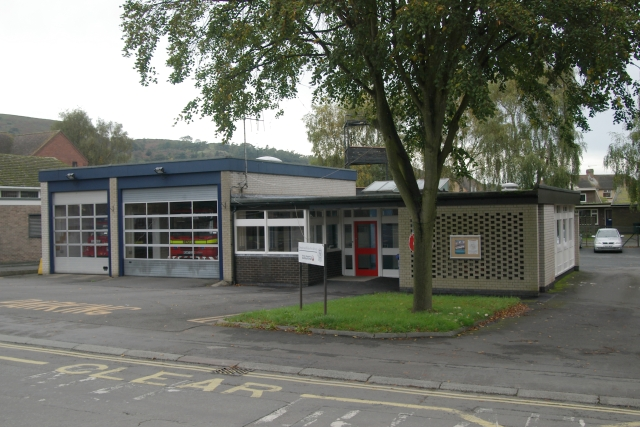
The town's fire station on Sandford Avenue

At the junction of Sandford Avenue and Essex Road, in the centre of the town, is a police station (West Mercia Police) staffed Monday-Friday and a fire station (Shropshire Fire and Rescue Service) with two engines and staffed by retained firefighters. The present fire station was built in the early 1970s – it was previously on Beaumont Road, where Beaumont Court now is – whilst the police station was built in the 1990s – it was on Shrewsbury Road where Longmynd Place now is.

=== Health ===
There is a doctors' surgery and medical clinic on Easthope Road. The nearest ambulance station is in Shrewsbury (following the closure of the Craven Arms Community Ambulance Station in 2021) and the nearest major hospital is the Royal Shrewsbury Hospital.

== Notable people ==
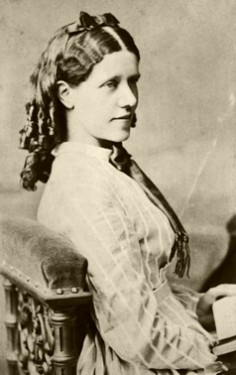
Hesba Stretton, circa 1860

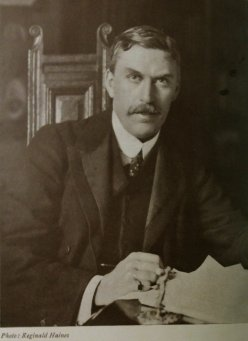
Charles Silvester Horne, 1920

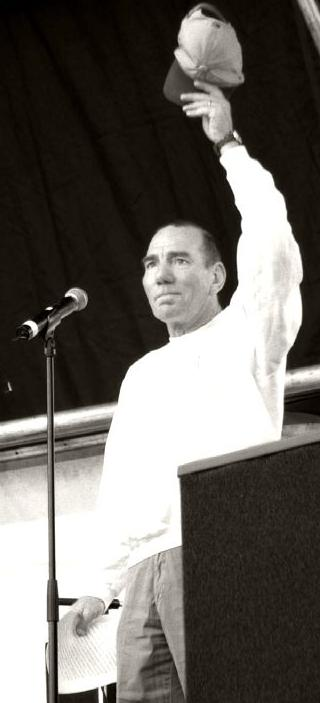
Pete Postlethwaite, 2004

- Sir John Thynne (c.1515 in Church Stretton – 1580) was the steward to Edward Seymour, 1st Duke of Somerset (c. 1506 – 1552) and a member of parliament. He was the builder of Longleat House and his descendants became Marquesses of Bath.
- Roger Maynwaring (c.1589/90 in Church Stretton - 1653) was Bishop of St David's 1636-49.
- John Mainwaring (1724-1807 in Church Stretton), theologian and first biographer of Handel, was Rector of Church Stretton from 1749.
- Frederic Leighton (1830–1896), artist, took his peerage title of Baron Leighton of Stretton in the County of Salop from here the day before his death. There is a window to his memory in St Laurence's Church.
- Hesba Stretton (1832–1911) came to Church Stretton often before moving away from Shropshire, becoming an established author. There is a plaque to her memory in St. Laurence's Church together with a window depicting the figure of Jessica from her immensely popular story Jessica's First Prayer; her sister Anne owned a house, Caradoc Lodge in neighbouring All Stretton, the latter village where her pen name allegedly originated.
- Tristram Speedy (1836–1910), explorer and adventurer, died at Chatsworth, Church Stretton.
- George Nickson (1864–1949), former Bishop of Bristol died in retirement at Church Stretton in 1949.
- Silvester Horne (1865–1914) a Congregationalist minister, Liberal MP for Ipswich, and father of the BBC broadcaster Kenneth Horne. He is buried in the cemetery on Cunnery Road. The town's Silvester Horne Institute, on the south end of High Street, commemorates his name.
- Marguerite Florence Laura Jarvis (1886–1964) writer under pseudonym of Oliver Sandys. writer, and actress; lived locally.
- Max Wenner (1887–1937), a Briton of Swiss ancestry, textile business heir, bought the manor of Church Stretton in 1934.
- Cyril Kenneth Bird CBE (1887–1965), the writer, pen name Fougasse moved to Church Stretton following his retirement
- Lily Chitty OBE (1893–1979), archaeologist, died at the Hillside Rest Home in Church Stretton in 1979.
- William Alonzo Parker (1897–1982), former Anglican Bishop of Shrewsbury, lived in retirement at Church Stretton.
- E. M. Almedingen (1898–1971), novelist, biographer, children's author, lived in the town in the 1930s.
- Norman Dewis OBE {1920–2019), former Jaguar chief test driver, lived in the town after his retirement in 1986.
- Two Archdeacons of Ludlow were also resident local rectors, Henry Dixon in 1923-1936 and Herbert Whately from 1937-1947.
- Pete Postlethwaite OBE (1946–2011), actor, lived in Minton, near Little Stretton
- Stephen Laurie (born ca.1965), notable amateur astronomer, lives in the area and has discovered a number of asteroids from observatories at Church Stretton and nearby Ragdon (the area not suffering from much light pollution). One of the asteroids discovered has been named after the town — 11626 Church Stretton.

=== Sport ===
- Frederick Green (1851–1928), amateur footballer winning side veteran of FA Cup Final of 1874 for Oxford University and of 1877 and 1878 for the Wanderers, died at his last home in the town in The Uplands.
- John Jones (born 1930 in Church Stretton-2011) rower with the men's coxless four, competed at the 1952 Summer Olympics
- Alison Williamson MBE (born 1971), the 2004 Olympic Games bronze-medal archer, is a primary school teacher in Church Stretton and is a member of the town's archery club.
- Justin Pearson (born 1971), stuntman, born and raised in the town and educated at Church Stretton School, leaving in 1988 to attend Ludlow College.

== See also ==
- Listed buildings in Church Stretton

== Footnotes ==
King's Arms (High St), Buck's Head (High St), Housmans (High St), Old Coopers Malt House (Shrewsbury Rd)
