= Bertram Prance =

English painter

Bertram Prance

Bertram Stanley Prance (5 December 1889 – 9 August 1958) was a British artist, poster artist and illustrator who worked as a cartoonist for Punch magazine among others.

== Early life ==
Prance was born in Bideford in Devon in 1889, one of five children of Deera Lock née Hollway (1861–1952) and Captain Fredrick William Prance (1859–1939) who was the owner and skipper of the fishing trawler 'Deera' (named after his wife), which operated out of the quayside in Bideford. Prance attended Bideford Art School and was a subscriber to the Press Art School, a correspondence course for drawing founded by Percy Bradshaw. The 1911 Census for Bideford lists Prance at the family home at 66 High Street with an occupation of Art Pupil Teacher employed by Bideford Council. In 1915 in Lambeth he married Kate 'Kitty' Lily Macfarlane (1895–1979) from Barnstaple and with her had two children: Barbara Valerie Prance (1920–1982) and Christopher Paul MacFarlane Prance (1927–). From 1917 during World War I Prance served in the Royal Air Force.

== Artistic career ==
Original artwork and book cover for Village at War by Anthony Armstrong (1941)

Between the wars his works were published in such periodicals as The Humorist, London Opinion, Punch and Tatler. During this period he was in demand as a book illustrator, working for Anthony Armstrong and on the books of his friend B.C. Hilliam of the singing-duo Mr. Flotsam and Mr. Jetsam. In 1934 he exhibited a painting at the Royal Academy Summer Exhibition. Shown is Prance's original design and the printed cover for Village at War (1941) to a text by Armstrong which shows how the book cover differed from the original artwork. The book was a humorous fictional account of village life during World War II. After the War Prance illustrated the Lone Pine series of books for children by Malcolm Saville. He was a member of the Savage Club and was an active member of the London Sketch Club, being elected President of the latter in 1948.

After leaving Bideford Prance lived most of his life up to 1940 in the village of Rudgwick in West Sussex where he built a large house he named 'Chudleigh' after the area in his native Bideford. Fellow artist W. Heath Robinson lived nearby and he and Prance became friends. In 1940 'Chudleigh' was requisitioned by the British Army and Prance returned to Bideford for the duration of the War. The Army altered the property so much that after the War Prance was too upset to return and it was sold. After briefly living in Hampstead in 1952 he bought West Campfield Place on Leith Hill in Surrey and here he established a new family home. Like other artists, Prance's output during and after the War declined and he turned to painting; working in gouache and oils he painted the countryside, skies, coasts and seashores which he had loved in his youth in Devon.

== Legacy ==
Prance was a supporter of the Burton Art Gallery which was founded in Bideford in 1951. In 1998 the Gallery held a retrospective exhibition of Prance's work arranged by his son Christopher, who was living in the town. A further exhibition of his works was held at the 'Burton' in 2016 to mark the purchase of three of Prance's original illustrations. The 'Burton' holds a number of his drawings and paintings in its permanent collection.

Bertram Stanley Prance died in Surrey in 1958 and left £6,452 15s 4d in his will to his widow and children.
