= Bideford Art School =

Former art school in Bideford, England

Coordinates: 51°01′13″N 4°12′15″W

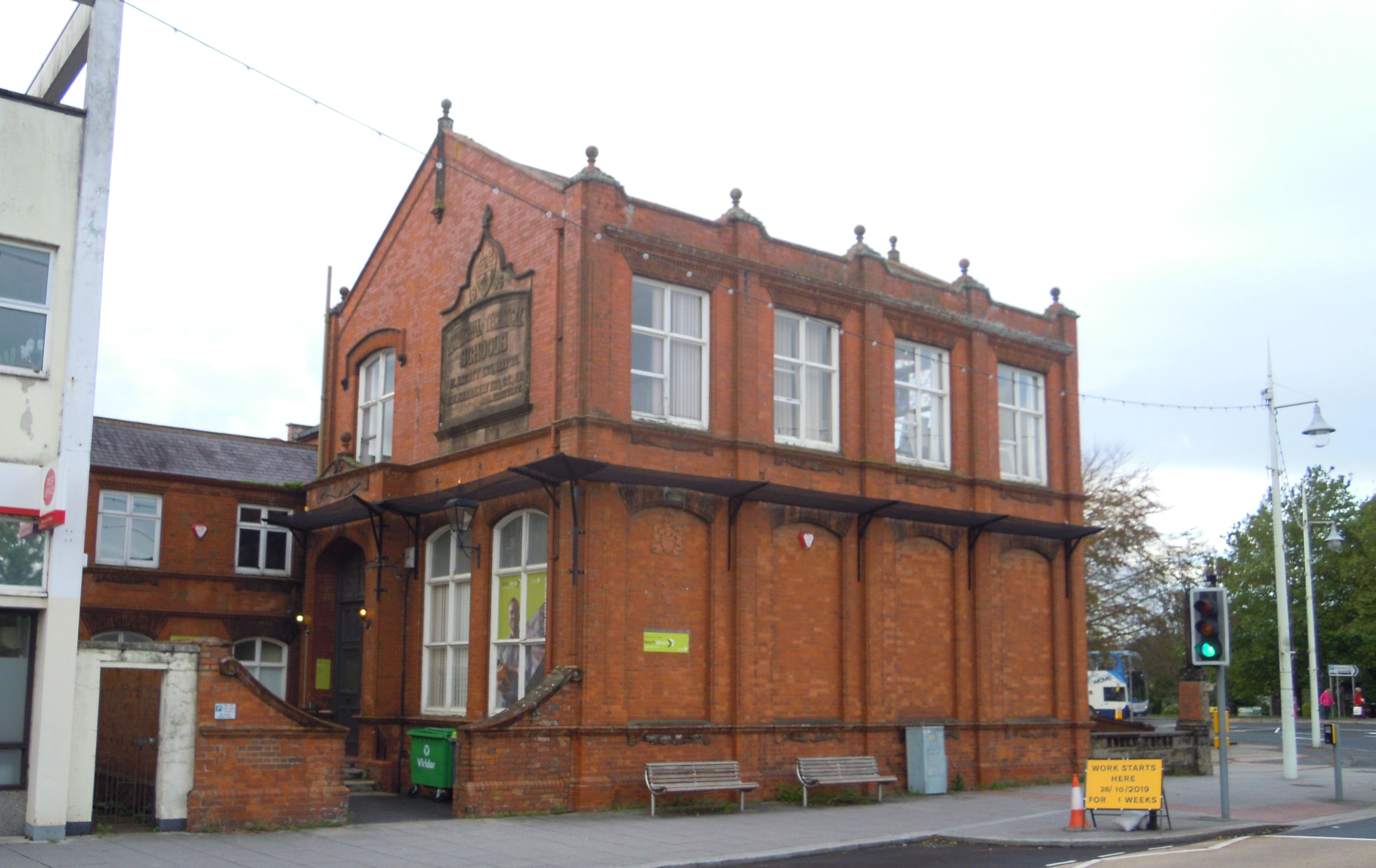
The former Bideford Art School in 2019

Bideford Art School was an art school in Bideford in Devon from 1896 until the 1970s. Located on The Quay, today the building is used as Bideford Arts Centre and has been a Grade II listed building on the Register of Historic England since 2001.

== History ==
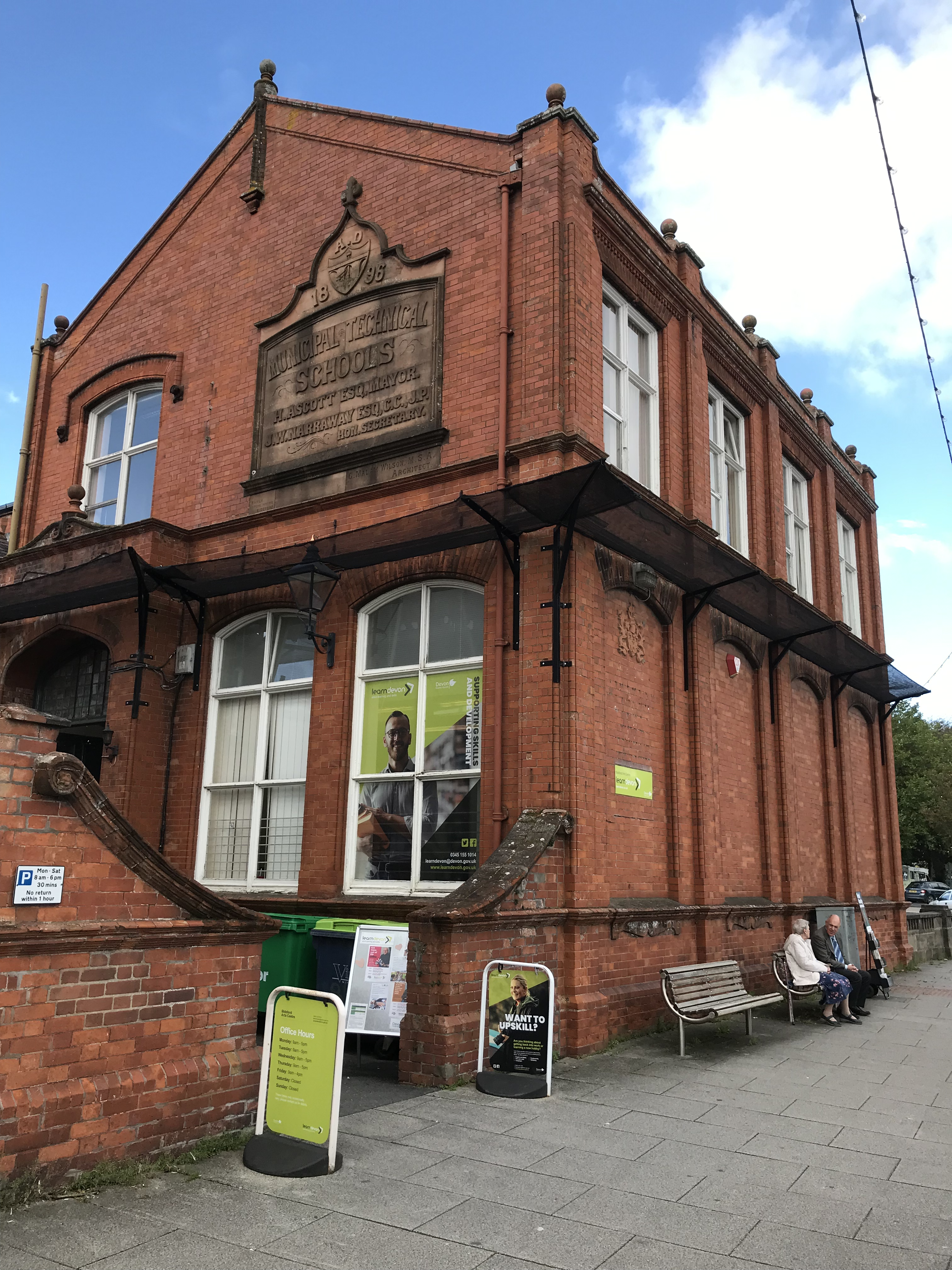
Front of the former art school

The former Bideford Art School is now a listed building. The builder and architect was George Malam Wilson (1855–1917) of Bideford. Built of red brick with a slate roof and parapeted gable ends, the building is on an L-shaped plan with the former classrooms to the north and east and the main entrance on the south side opening onto a small courtyard with the original office/Master's house.

It opened in 1896 as a technical college as attested by the large plaque on the side of the building which mentions Henry Ascott, then Mayor of Bideford, together with Alderman John Whitlock Narroway, who was involved with opening Bideford Library. The drive for ‘municipal socialising’ during the latter decades of the reign of Queen Victoria saw the opening of numerous museums, art galleries and technical colleges for the improvement of the public. Possibly because of its location as a place where artists met and worked, the technical college at Bideford evolved into a specialist art school where students were able to access excellent teaching in small groups before moving on for further training at larger art schools elsewhere.

Among the artists who trained at Bideford are Allin Braund, who later taught at Hornsey School of Art in the 1930s, and Judith Ackland and Sheila Hutchinson; their work is part of the nearby Burton at Bideford's permanent collection. Rosemary Sutcliff, later to gain fame as the author of The Eagle of the Ninth, trained in art here before going on to become a member of the Royal Society of Miniaturists. Leslie Worth, who became President of the Royal Watercolour Society, trained here, as did George Belcher and Bertram Prance, both of whom became cartoonists for Punch. The artist Leslie Davenport taught here early in his career. In the 1950s under the direction of Jim Paterson the art school at Bideford became well known for its training in pottery.

== Recent years ==
In the 1970s the Art School became a general further education college at which time art education became centred at North Devon College in nearby Barnstaple (now Petroc College). The building now houses Bideford Arts Centre.

== Notable alumni ==
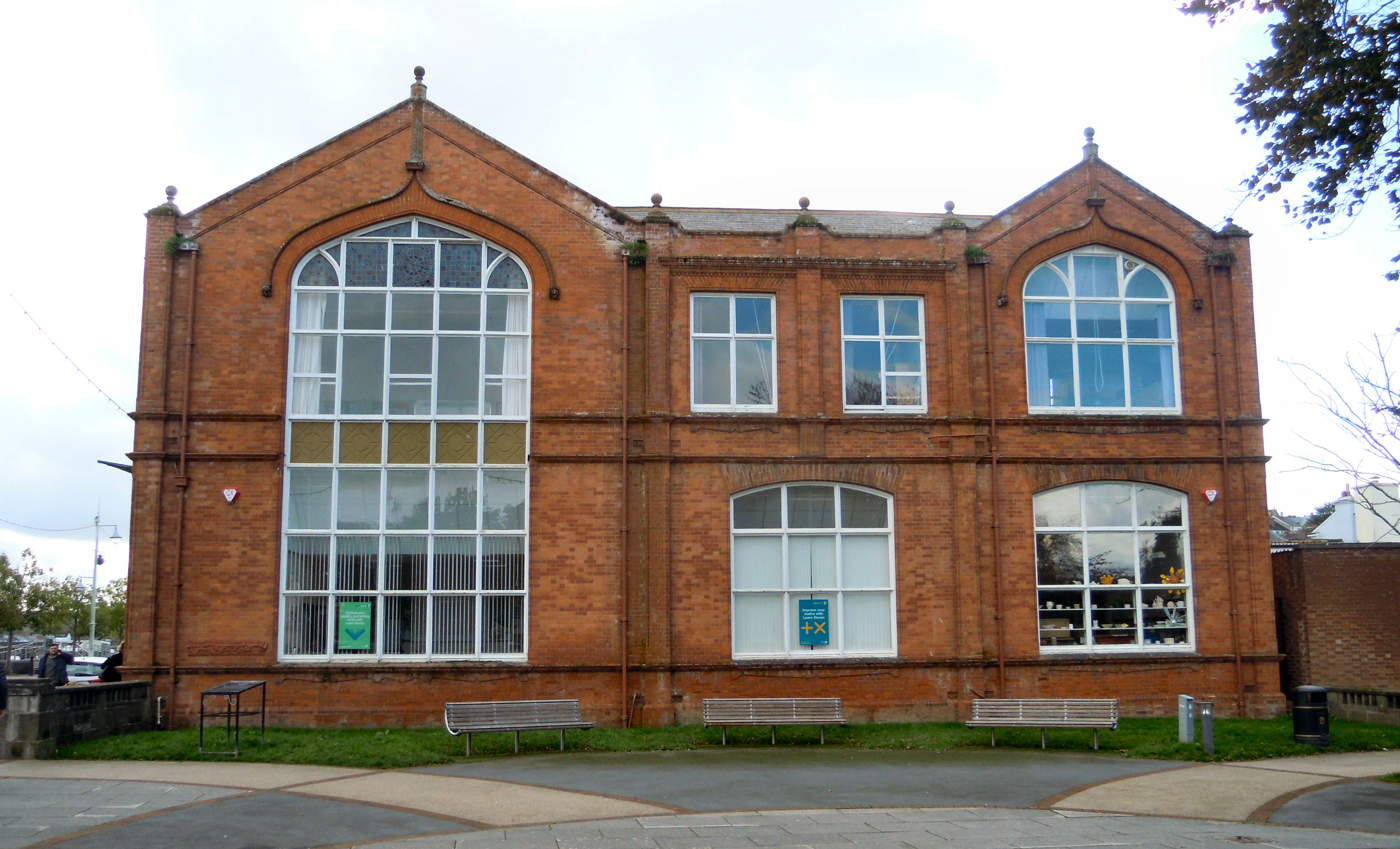
Rear view of Bideford Art School showing the windows of the art studios

- Judith Ackland
- George Belcher
- Allin Braund
- Bertram Prance
- Frank Southgate (1872–1916)
- Rosemary Sutcliff
- Leslie Worth
