= Church Stretton School =

Location
- Shrewsbury Road; Church Stretton, Shropshire, SY6 6EX; England
- Coordinates: 52.5445°N 2.8045°W

Information
- Type: Academy
- Local authority: Shropshire Council
- Trust: South Shropshire Academy Trust
- Department for Education URN: 139455 Tables
- Ofsted: Reports
- Head teacher: Andy Wood
- Gender: Coeducational
- Age range: 11–16
- Enrolment: 545 (2025)
- Capacity: 600
- Website: www.churchstretton.shropshire.sch.uk

Church Stretton School is an 11–16 mixed secondary school with academy status in Church Stretton, Shropshire, England.

Previously a community school administered by Shropshire Council, Church Stretton School converted to academy status in April 2013. The school is now part of the TrustEd Schools Partnership (previously the South Shropshire Academy Trust), which runs five secondary and four primary academies.

The school became comprehensive in 1977.

== Notable alumni ==
- Justin Pearson, stuntman
