= George Belcher =

British artist

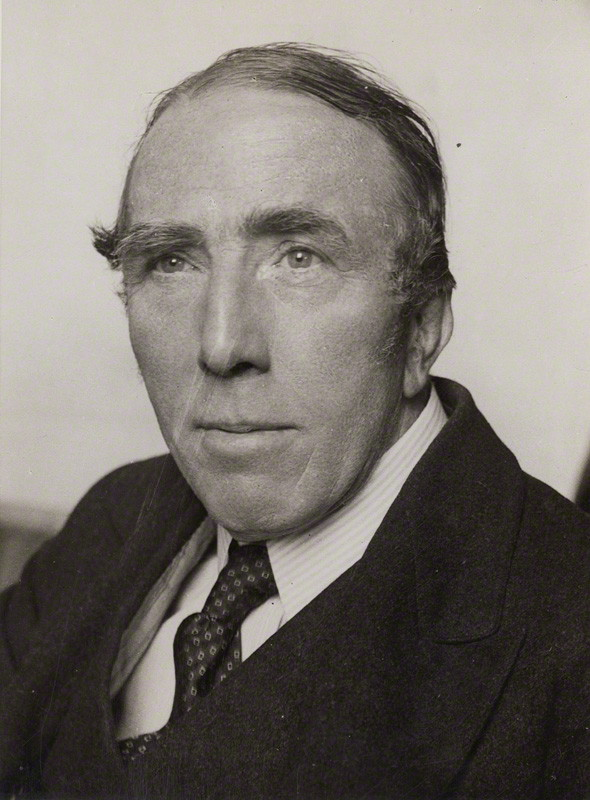
- Belcher in the 1930s
- Born: 19 September 1875; London
- Died: 3 October 1947 (aged 72); Surrey
- Education: Gloucester School of Art
- Known for: Comic Artist

George Frederick Arthur Belcher RA (19 September 1875 – 3 October 1947) was an English cartoonist, etcher and painter of genre, sporting subjects and still life.

He was born in London on 19 September 1875 and studied at Bideford Art School and the Gloucester School of Art. He drew for the Punch Almanac from 1906 and for Punch itself regularly from 1911; also for the Tatler and Vanity Fair. His work was also part of the painting event in the art competition at the 1928 Summer Olympics.

Belcher exhibited at the Royal Academy from 1909. He was made an Associate (A.R.A.) in 1931, and a Royal Academician (R.A.) 1946. His first one-man show was at the Leicester Galleries in 1909. He died at Chiddingfold, Surrey on 3 October 1947. A retrospective exhibition was held at Cranleigh Hall in 1954.

== Literature ==
- Kenneth Guichard, British Etchers 1850–1940, Robin Garton, London 1977.
- An exhibition of Comic Drawings by George Belcher R.A. 1875–1947, Langton Gallery, 1986.
