= James Edmund Vincent =

Welsh barrister, journalist, and author

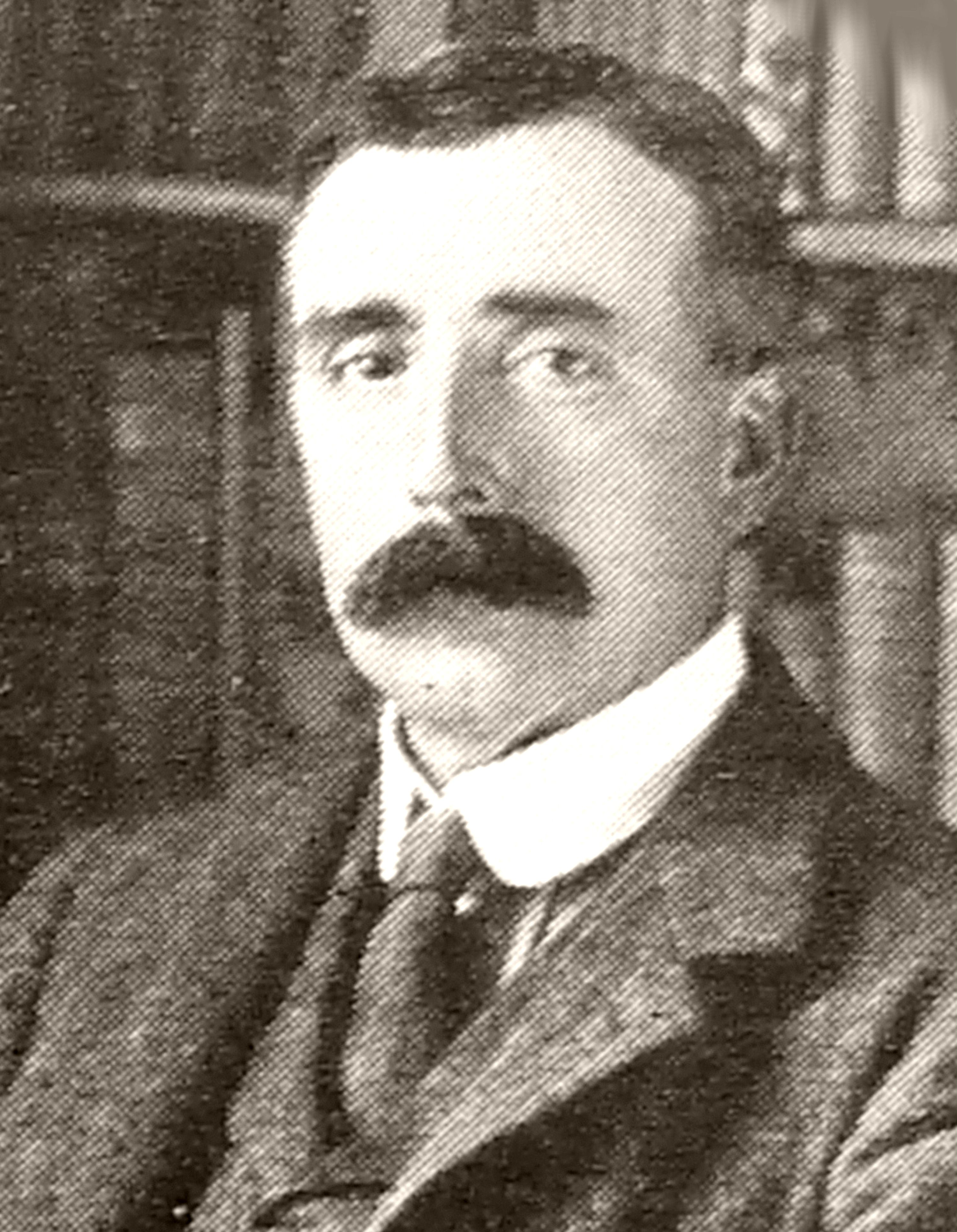
- Vincent, in 1907
- Born: 17 November 1857
- Died: 19 July 1909 (aged 51)
- Education: Christ Church, Oxford
- Occupations: Barrister; journalist

James Edmund Vincent (17 November 1857 – 18 July 1909) was a Welsh barrister, known as a journalist and author.

== Life ==
Born on 17 November 1857 at St. Anne's, Bethesda, he was eldest son of the cleric James Crawley Vincent, son of James Vincent Vincent and then incumbent there, by his wife Grace, daughter of William Johnson, rector of Llanfaethlu, Anglesey; his father as vicar of Caernarfon died during the cholera epidemic of 1867. He elected to scholarships at Eton College and Winchester College in 1870, going to the latter, and in 1876 won a junior studentship at Christ Church, Oxford, matriculating on 13 October. He gained a second class in classical moderations in 1878 and a third class in the final classical school in 1880, when he graduated B.A.

Entering the Inner Temple on 13 April 1881, Vincent was called to the bar on 26 January 1884. He went the North Wales circuit, and was also a reporter for the Law Times in the bankruptcy department of the Queen's Bench division from 1884 to 1889. In 1890 he was appointed chancellor of the diocese of Bangor.

Vincent joined the staff of The Times in 1886, and then for most of his life was the main descriptive reporter of the paper. In 1901, as special correspondent, he accompanied the Duke of Cornwall and York on his colonial tour. From 1894 to 1897 he edited the National Observer, after W. E. Henley's retirement, and from 1897 to 1901 Country Life.

Vincent bought Lime Close, Drayton, a house near Abingdon. He died of pleurisy at a nursing home in London on 18 July 1909, and was buried in Brookwood cemetery. A brass memorial tablet, with Latin inscription, was placed in Bangor Cathedral in 1910.

== Works ==
Vincent wrote:

- Football (1885) in the "Historical Sporting" series, with Montague Shearman.
- Tenancy in Wales (1887).
- His Royal Highness Duke of Clarence and Avondale, born Jan. 8th, 1864–died Jan. 14, 1892: a memoir (1893), authorised biography of Prince Albert Victor, Duke of Clarence and Avondale.
- The Land Question in North Wales, (1896), from the landowners' point of view; Welsh translation by Thomas Rowland Roberts.
- The Land Question in South Wales, a defence of the landowners of South Wales and Monmouthshire (1897).
- John Nixon, Pioneer of the Steam Coal Trade in South Wales (1900), on John Nixon.
- From Cradle to Crown (1902), illustrated popular account of the life of King Edward VII, reissued in 1910 as The Life of Edward the Seventh.
- The Memories of Sir Llewelyn Turner (1903), on his father's friend and co-worker in North Wales.
- Highways and Byways in Berkshire (1906).
- Historical surveys in W. T. Pike's Berks, Bucks, and Bedfordshire in the Twentieth Century (1907).
- Through East Anglia in a Motor-Car (1907) with illustrations by Frank Southgate. London : Methuen.
- Hertfordshire in the Twentieth Century (1908).
- Story of the Thames (1909).

He contributed occasionally to the Quarterly Review and the Cornhill Magazine.

== Family ==
Vincent married on 12 August 1884 Mary Alexandra, second daughter of Silas Kemball Cook, governor of the Seamen's Hospital, Greenwich, who survived him with two daughters.
