= John Nixon (mining engineer) =

British mining engineer (1815–1899)

John Nixon (10 May 1815 – 3 June 1899) was an English mining engineer and colliery proprietor and an influential figure in the development of the South Wales coalfield and export business.

== Life ==
He was born at Barlow, Gateshead, the only son of a tenant farmer of that village. He was educated at the village school and at Dr. Bruce's academy at Newcastle-on-Tyne, famous as the training-place of many great engineers. Leaving school at the age of fourteen, Nixon was set to farmwork for a time, and shortly after was apprenticed to Joseph Gray of Garesfield, the Marquis of Bute's chief mining engineer. On the expiry of his indentures he became for two years overman at the Garesfield colliery. At the end of this time, in 1839, he undertook a survey of the underground workings of the Dowlais Company in South Wales. Some years later he accepted the appointment of mining engineer to an English company working a coal and iron field at Languin near Nantes. He perceived, however, that the enterprise was destined to fail, and did not hesitate to inform his employers of his opinion. After labouring for some time to carry on a hopeless concern he returned to England.

During his first visit to Wales, Nixon had been impressed by the natural advantages of Welsh coal for use in furnaces. On his return from France he found that it was beginning to be used by the Thames steamers. He perceived that there was a great opening for it on the Loire, where coal was already imported by sea. At the time, however, he was unable to obtain a supply with which to commence a trade. Lucy Thomas of the Graig colliery at Merthyr, who supplied the Thames steamers, was disinclined to extend her operations, and Nixon was compelled to return to the north of England. However, business again taking him to South Wales, he chartered a small vessel, took a cargo of hundreds of tons of coal to Nantes, and distributed it gratuitously among the sugar refineries, which had been using Newcastle coal.

Its merits were quickly perceived; the French government definitely adopted it, including using it exclusively for the French Navy, and a demand was created among the manufactories and on the Loire. Returning to Wales he made arrangements for sinking a mine at Werfa to secure an adequate supply. After being on the point of failure from lack of capital he obtained assistance and achieved success, with the Navigation Colliery in Mountain Ash being completed in 1860, becoming the first true deep pit in South Wales.

Continuing his operations in association with other enterprising men of the neighbourhood, he acquired and made many collieries in South Wales. By 1896, Nixon's Navigation Coal Co. Ltd. employed 1558 men, and in 1897 the output of the Nixon group was 1,250,000 tons a year. Nixon succeeded, after a long struggle, in inducing the railway companies of Great Britain to adopt Welsh coal for consumption in their locomotives. He had great difficulty also in persuading the Great Western Railway to patronise the coal traffic, which came to form so large a part of their freight business.

Much of Nixon's success was due to his improvements in the art of mining. He introduced the 'long wall' system of working in place of the wasteful 'pillar and stall' system, and invented the machine known as 'Billy Fairplay' for measuring accurately the proportion between large coal and small, which came into universal use. He also made improvements in ventilating and in winding machinery. He was one of the original movers in establishing the sliding-scale system, and one of the founders of the Monmouthshire and South Wales Coalowners' Association. He was for fifteen years chairman of the earlier South Wales Coal Association, and for many years represented Wales in the Mining Association of Great Britain. Nixon materially contributed to the growth of Cardiff by inducing leading persons in South Wales to petition the trustees of the Marquis of Bute in 1853 for increased dock accommodation, and by persuading the trustees, in spite of the objections of their engineer, Sir John Rennie, to increase the depth of the East Dock.

He died in London, on 3 June 1899 at 117 Westbourne Terrace, Hyde Park, and was buried on 8 June in the Mountain Ash cemetery, Aberdare valley.

== Sources ==
- James Edmund Vincent, John Nixon, Pioneer of the Steam Coal Trade in South Wales (London, 1900).
- Williams, John. "Nixon, John (1815–1899)". Oxford Dictionary of National Biography (online ed.). Oxford University Press. doi:10.1093/ref:odnb/20210. (Subscription, Wikipedia Library access or UK public library membership required.)
- Chisholm, Hugh, ed. (1911). "Nixon, John" . Encyclopædia Britannica. Vol. 19 (11th ed.). Cambridge University Press. p. 719.
