= John Jones (rower) =

British rower

Personal information
- Born: John Stephen Major Jones; 22 April 1930 Church Stretton, Great Britain
- Died: 9 September 2011 (aged 81) England

Sport
- Sport: Rowing
Medal record
Men's rowing
Representing Great Britain
European Rowing Championships
Gold medal – first place	1951 Mâcon	Eight

John Stephen Major Jones (22 April 1930 – 9 September 2011) was a British rower.

== Early life ==
Born at Church Stretton, Shropshire, Jones was educated in Shrewsbury. After completing National Service in the British Army's Royal Artillery, he entered Cambridge University.

== Rowing career ==
At university Jones joined the Lady Margaret Boat Club, with whom he won the Gold Challenge Cup at Henley in 1950. He then rowed with the Cambridge crew in The Boat Race in 1952 (when they lost) and 1953 (when they won).

He competed at the 1952 Summer Olympics in Helsinki with the men's coxless four where they came fourth.

== Later life ==
Jones became a London stockbroker and was partner in the City firm of Buckmaster & Moore who were taken over by Credit Suisse in 1987.
