= Rectory Wood =

Rectory Wood & Field
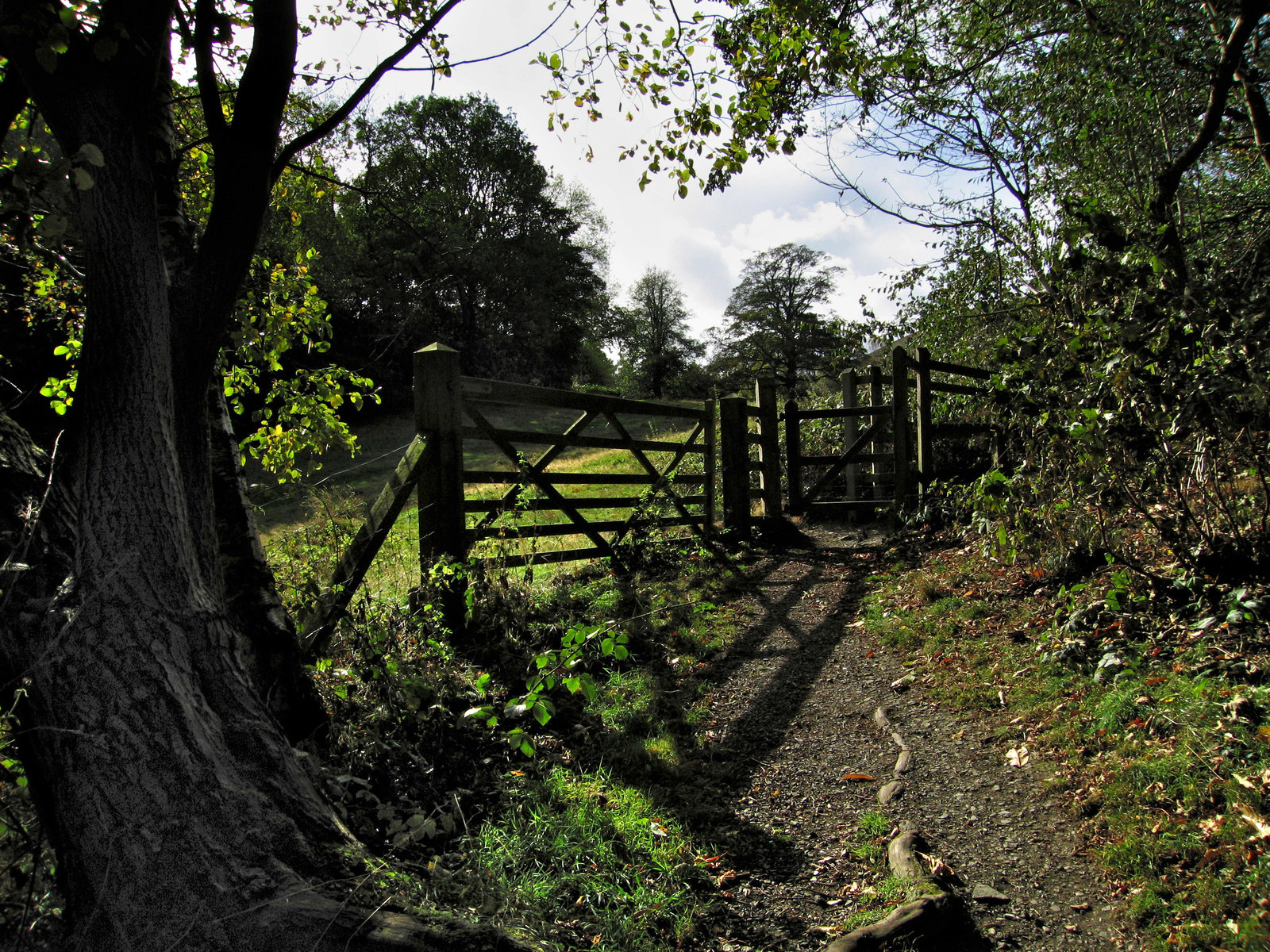
- Entrance to Rectory Wood

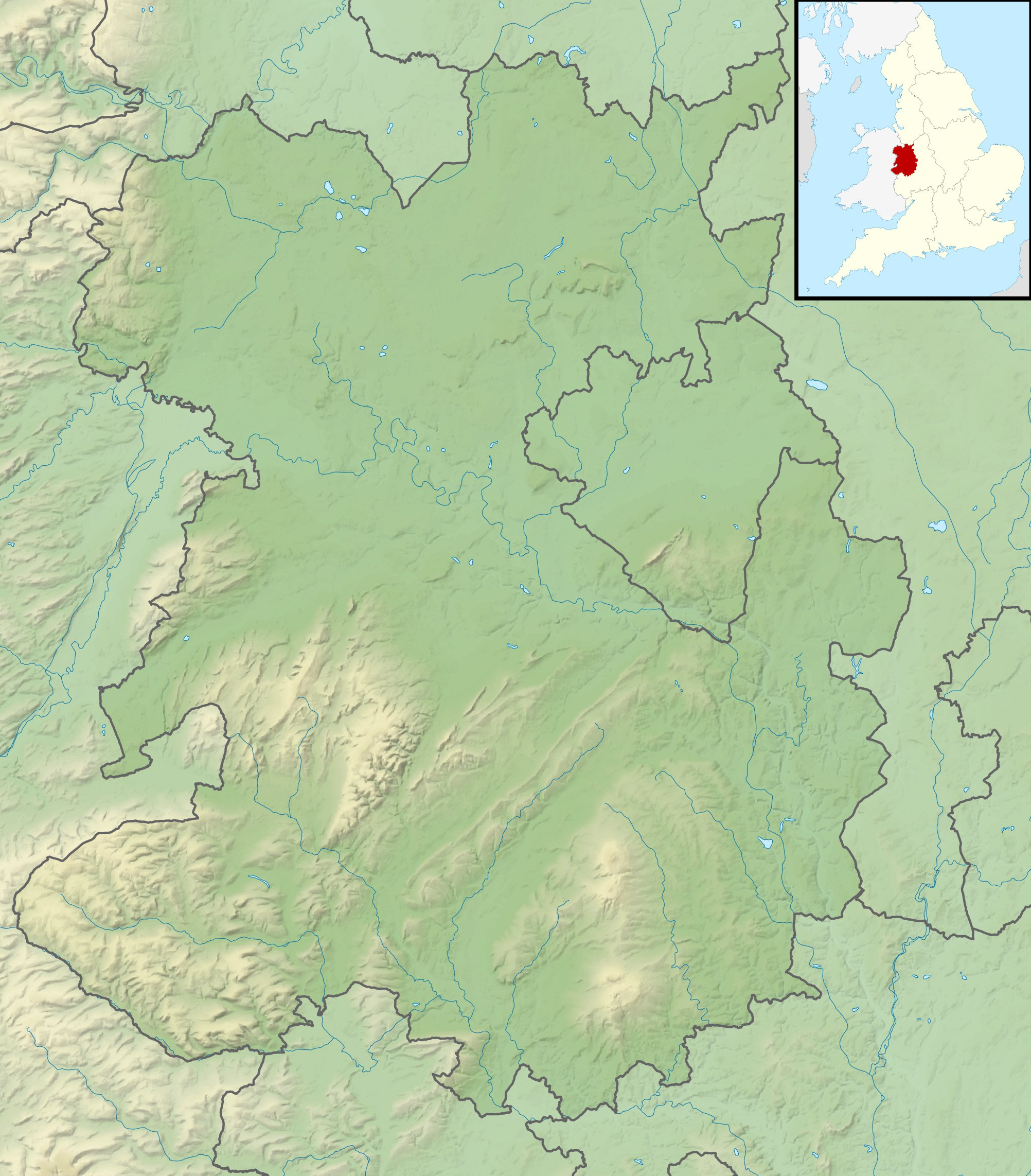
- Location within Shropshire
- Location: Church Stretton
- Coordinates: 52°32′22″N 2°48′46″W
- Area: 10.1 hectares (25 acres)
- Established: 1960
- Governing body: Shropshire Council

Rectory Wood is a wooded area in Church Stretton in Shropshire.

== Background ==
Rectory Wood is in the heart of Church Stretton. The site is within the Shropshire Hills, designated as an Area of Outstanding Natural Beauty (AONB).

The wood mainly comprises mature native broadleaf species, with supplementary mixed planting. There is also a meadow on a steep bank adjacent to the wood which rises up to meet the Long Mynd. The site gets its name from being formerly part of the grounds of the Old Rectory.

== Recreation ==
There are many walking paths available on the site, some extending to the Long Mynd. Most pathways are steep and the terrain can be muddy, but there is an easy circular 30–45-minute walk suitable for the general public, and another family walking route has been designed.

In May 2009 Rectory Wood was described as the least stressful place in England by an article in the Independent newspaper: "By a series of twisty byways and capricious diagonals, I'd discovered the least stressful location in England: its name is Rectory Wood, Church Stretton."

== Archaeology ==
In March 2009 a community archaeology investigation of Rectory Wood began as part of the Rectory Wood Heritage Project funded by the National Heritage Lottery Fund and Shropshire Council.

The investigations involved an evaluation, and excavation of two structures, an icehouse and a summerhouse. These structures are within an 18th- and 19th-century landscaped garden that has connections with Lancelot “Capability” Brown, who was friends with Professor John Mainwaring the rector of the parish who also helped to improve the grounds.
