= Leslie Worth =

English painter

Leslie Worth OBE (1923–2009) was an English watercolourist.

== Life and career ==
Worth attended Bideford Art School and the Royal College of Art and later became an art teacher at the Epsom School of Art (now the University for the Creative Arts).

He lived in Epsom, Surrey, England for much of his life, frequently painting the Epsom Downs. He is noted for his works based on Dante's Inferno, and for those on roses. He had a strong interest in music and poetry, claiming this influenced his work.

== Writings ==
- The Practice of Watercolour Painting; Pitman, London (1977) ISBN 978-0-273-00115-7
