= Frank Southgate =

British painter (1872-1916)

Frank Southgate RBA
- Born: Edward Frank Southgate; 1 August 1872; Hunstanton, England
- Died: 23 February 1916 (aged 43); France

Edward Frank Southgate RBA (1 August 1872 – 23 February 1916) was a British painter. He spent most of his life in Norfolk and concentrated on painting birds, especially waterfowl, and hunting scenes.

== Biography ==
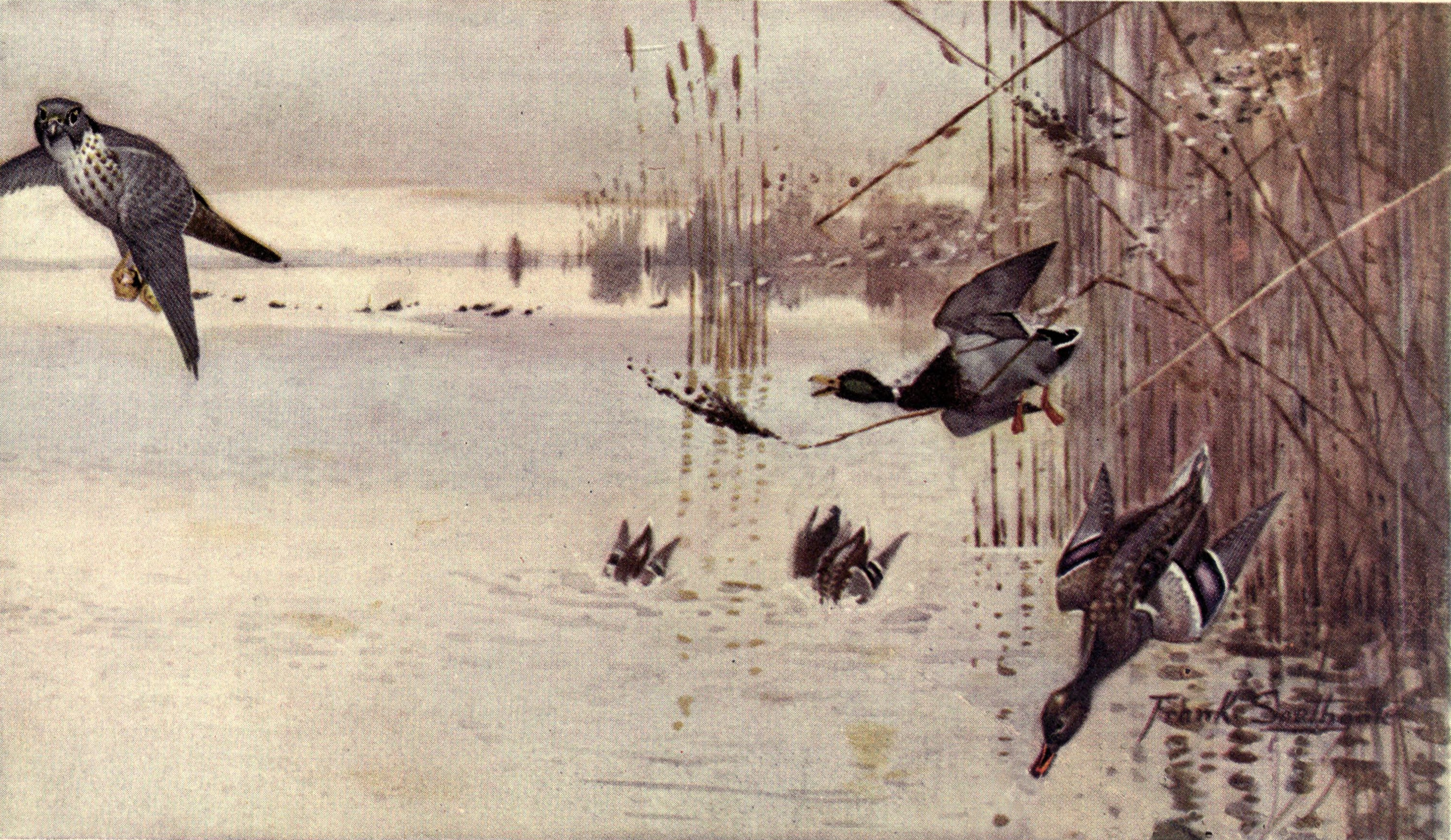
Image from Notes of an East Coast Naturalist, titled 'The stricken mallard.'

Edward Frank Southgate was born 1 August 1872 in Hunstanton, Norfolk.

He was a student at Bideford Art School and Cambridge School of Art.

He was a member of the Royal Society of British Artists.

Southgate painted mainly birds and sporting scenes. His paintings of ducks and other birds in Patterson 1904 (for instance "The Stricken Mallard") were internationally renowned. In 2013 he was marked as one of the "excellent bird painters, who both illustrated books and painted pictures for the private collector", together with Winifred Austen, George Edward Lodge and Allen W. Seaby.

Southgate died in 1916, whilst serving in the Army during the First World War in France, aged 43 years. He received a short 'Im Memoriam' (in Dutch) by A.B. Wigman in De Levende Natuur (vol. 21, 1916).

Some of his paintings are part of collections of local Norfolk museums, like the Lynn Museum in King's Lynn (two portraits) and the Norwich Castle museum ("Marsh harrier and wounded teal").

== Book illustrations ==
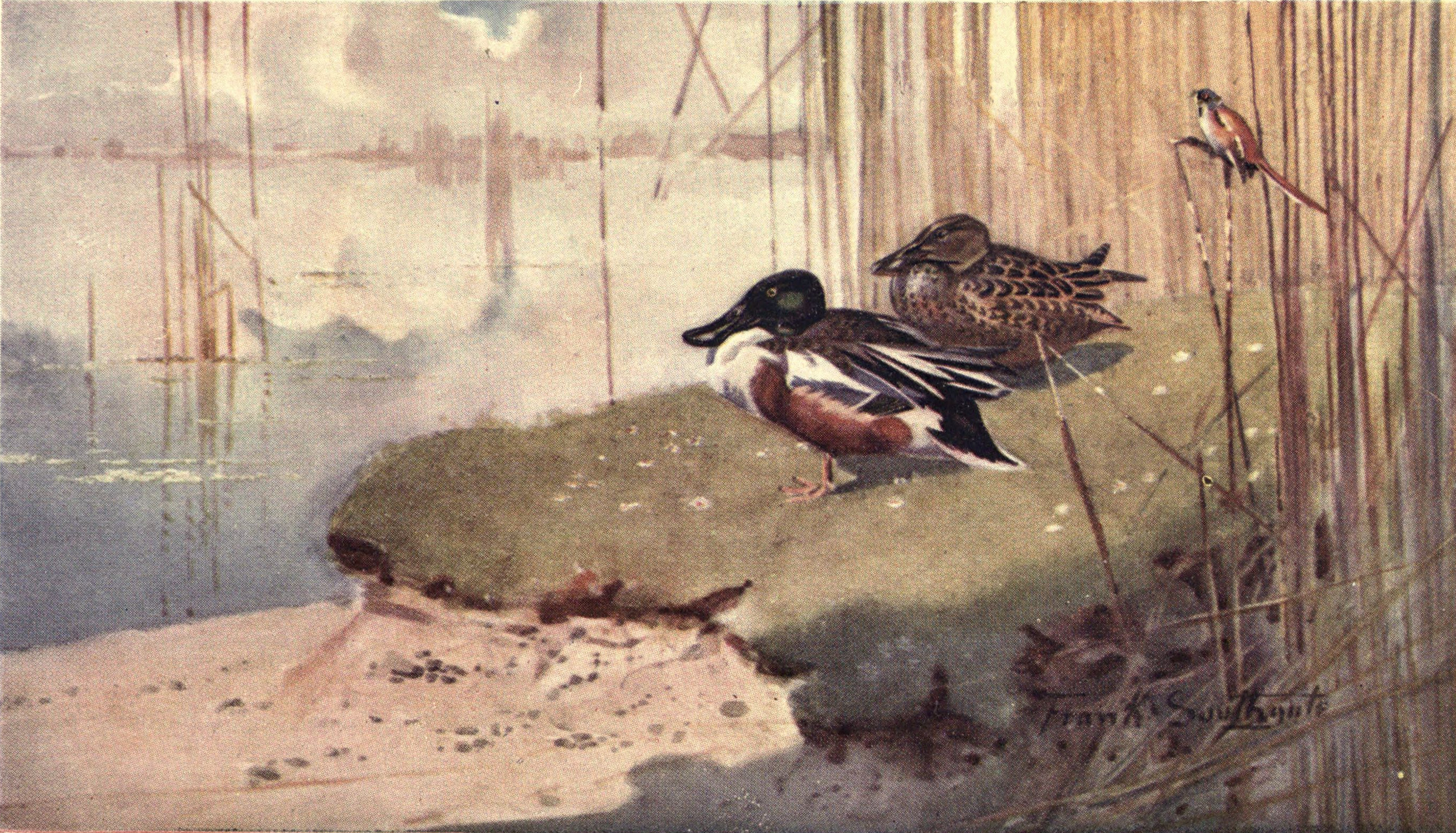
Frontispiece of Notes of an East Coast Naturalist, showing shovelers and bearded tit

Southgate also illustrated several books, for instance:

- Patterson, Arthur Henry (1904). Notes of an East Coast Naturalist: a series of observations made at odd times during a period of twenty-five years in the neighborhood of Great Yarmouth. London: Methuen & Co. OCLC 15720987.
- Patterson, Arthur Henry (1905). Nature in Eastern Norfolk ... With twelve illustrations in colour by F. Southgate. London: Methuen. OCLC 776237584.
- Vincent, James Edmund (1907). Through East Anglia in a Motor-Car. London: Methuen. OCLC 522053.
- Fletcher, J.S. (1908). A Book about Yorkshire ... With sixteen illustrations in colour by Wal Paget and Frank Southgate, R.B.A., and sixteen other illustrations. London: Methuen. OCLC 561056202.
- Wild Nature and Country Life. London: Hodder & Stoughton. 1912. OCLC 774436071.
- Pollard, Hugh Bertie Campbell (1928). Wildfowl & waders: Nature & sport in the coastlands, depicted by the late Frank Southgate, R.B.A., and described by Hugh B.C. Pollard. London: Country Life. OCLC 3458758.
- Dutt, William A. (1929). Norfolk (7th rev. ed.). London: Methuen. OCLC 977706846.
