= Lone Pine (books) =

Children's book series by Malcolm Saville

- Author: Malcolm Saville
- Language: English
- Publication date: 1943–78
- Publication place: United Kingdom
- Media type: Print (Hardback & Paperback)

Lone Pine is a series of children's books written by English author Malcolm Saville.

Although they were written over a 35-year timespan, between 1943 and 1978, the characters only age by a few years in the course of the series. The earlier books evoke visions of an outdoor 1940s and '50s childhood reminiscent of Enid Blyton's Famous Five books, in which children are allowed to have adventures, explore strange places and encounter villains without adult supervision. These Lone Pine books were illustrated by Bertram Prance (1889-1958). The later books adjust to the mood of the 1960s and '70s, as the older characters grow into their late teens and new characters join the Lone Pine Club.

Many of the books are set on or around the Long Mynd and Stiperstones hills in south Shropshire, England, but some are based in Sussex (centred on Rye), Dartmoor, the Goathland and Whitby area of Yorkshire and the Southwold and Walberswick area of the Suffolk coast. One book is set in London, the self-explanatory Lone Pine London. The books reflect Saville's Christianity and moral values, and the phrase "From Loyalty to Love", which is the Lone Pine Club's motto, is a signifier of his beliefs.

== Characters ==
The Lone Pine Club's members are: David Morton (Captain), Petronella "Peter" Sterling (Vice Captain), Richard "Dickie" and Mary Morton, Thomas "Tom" Ingles, Jenny Harman, Jonathan "Jon" Warrender, Penelope "Penny" Warrender and Harriet Sparrow. Macbeth, or "Mackie", is the Mortons' Scottish terrier and is present in all books.

== Books ==
- Mystery at Witchend (1943)
- Seven White Gates (1944)
- The Gay Dolphin Adventure (1945)
- The Secret of Grey Walls (1947)
- Lone Pine Five (1949)
- The Elusive Grasshopper (1951)
- The Neglected Mountain (1953)
- Saucers Over The Moor (1955)
- Wings Over Witchend (1956)
- Lone Pine London (1957)
- The Secret of the Gorge (1958)
- Mystery Mine (1959)
- Sea Witch Comes Home (1960)
- Not Scarlet But Gold (1962)
- Treasure at Amorys (1964)
- Man With Three Fingers (1966)
- Rye Royal (1969)
- Strangers at Witchend (1970)
- Where's My Girl? (1972)
- Home to Witchend (1978)
