= Allin Braund =

English painter (1915–2004)

Allin Braund (1915–2004) was an English artist. He worked in the mediums of oil, watercolour, lithography, stained glass, relief sculpture & sculpture (including the then cutting-edge use of fibre-glass).

Unlike many of his fellow '54 Venice Biennale collaborators, Braund's works did not start to fully realise commercial acknowledgement until circa 2000.

== Early life and military service ==
Braund was born in Devon and educated at Hornsey College of Art. Like many of his generation, he served in World War II. Trained as a Royal Marines signaller, he was sent to Crete as part of MNBDO I (Mobile Naval Base Defence Organisation), the primary British contingent of the island's defending forces. There, he took part in the Battle of Crete, seeing close-quarter fighting during the initial landing of German paratroopers. He subsequently made the trek through the Cretan mountains to be evacuated to Alexandria.

Braund went on to participate in further operations in North Africa, Ceylon with the MNBDO, later taking a commission and transferring to the UK as a Royal Navy schoolmaster, delivering Educational and Vocational Training to demobilising troops at centres at Scapa Flow and in London.

Allin Braund was also an accomplished weightlifter, footballer and golfer.

== Teaching ==
He taught at Bideford Grammar School before World War II and demobilised to Hornsey College of Art to teach design and printmaking until 1976.

== Artistic career ==
Over this period he developed a style of cubist space in his lithographs, which were quick to find critical acclaim. Some of these lithographs were chosen to represent Great Britain at the 1954 Venice Biennale. There, he joined his contemporaries including Lucian Freud, Henry Moore, Francis Bacon, Ben Nicholson, Henry Cliffe and Eduardo Paolozzi. He became a major force in British art from the early 1950s and gained a following overseas.

Exhibitions with his contemporaries quickly followed in London galleries, such as the Redfern Gallery in Cork Street, St Georges Gallery, and the Zwemmer Gallery. He also exhibited at The Royal Academy of Arts and the Arts Council of Great Britain. His works are held in the collections of the British Government, the Victoria and Albert Museum, the Museum of Modern Art in New York, the Boston Art Museum, the Cuming Museum and the British Council. His relief sculptures can be found adjacent to the Thames River Police Boatyard in Wapping and Paddigton Police Station (now West End Gate).

He was featured in documentaries including The BBC's 'The Artist at Work' and the press, including The Spectator and The Arts Review; editions 1960 and 1963. Allen Jones described his teacher’s work as "Braque out of doors". Braund himself, defined his point of view as ” dissect and assemble”.

From 1976 until his death in 2004, Braund resided in rural North Devon in the warehouse-like barn attached to his home. The barn was a large, open multi-media space which housed his tools and equipment.

== Style ==
His paint works composed of receding planes parallel to the picture plane in a post-cubist idiom. They encapsulated a less formalised response to the West Country landscape and tended to focus on fixing a moment of the changing sky. Nature for Braund does not rest, it swirls and fights, but his later work seemed to return to the more romantic simplicity of his early work. The colour is subdued and the forms, whilst inventive are direct and bold.
