= Justin Pearson (stuntman) =

British stunt man and stunt coordinator (born 1971)

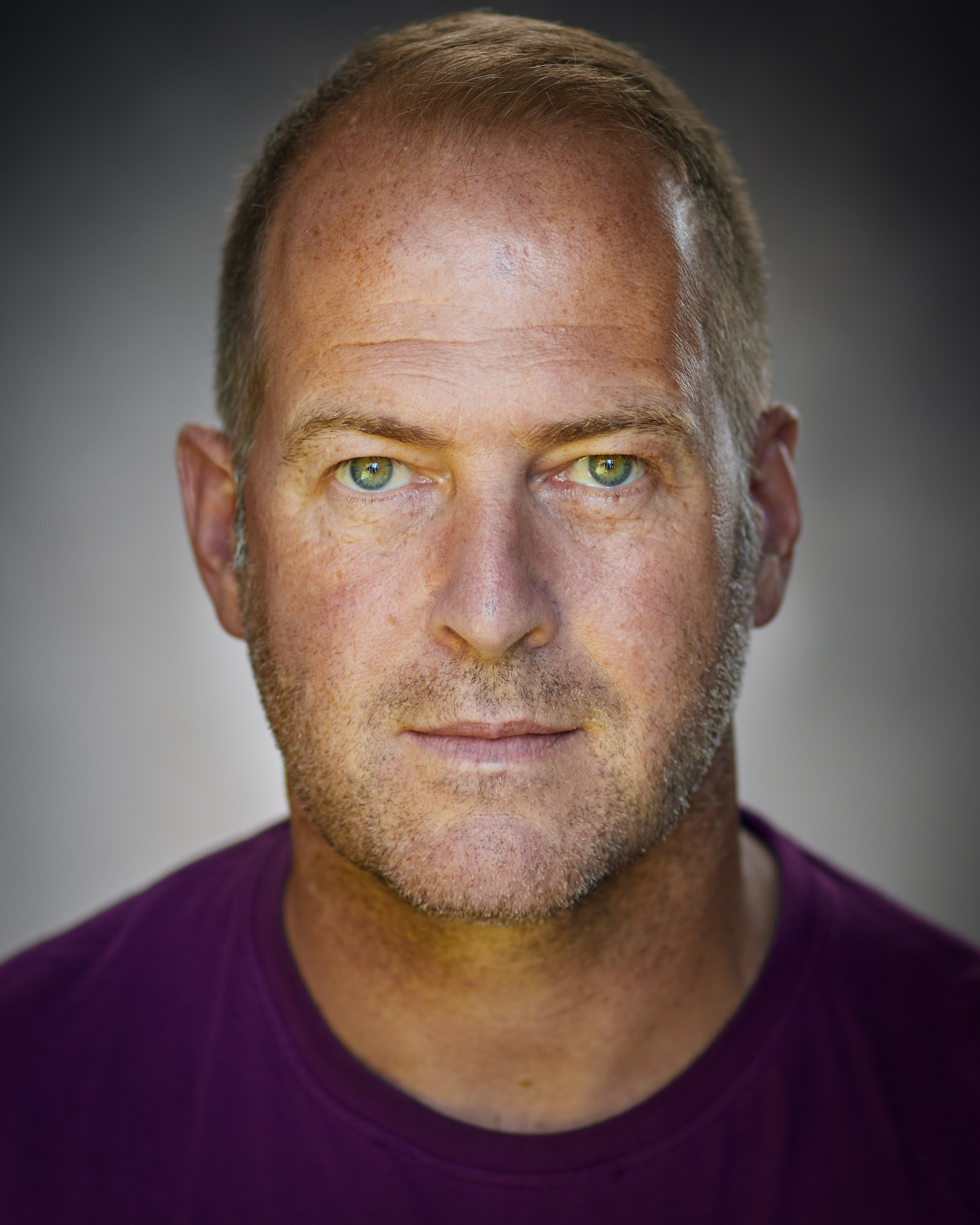
- Born: 1971 (age 54–55); Shrewsbury, Shropshire, England
- Occupations: Stunt Coordinator and Performer
- Years active: 26
- Known for: The Knights of the Damned Jousting Stunt Team and film stunt performances

Justin Pearson (born 1971) is a British stunt man and stunt coordinator who is best known for his stunt work in Harry Potter and the Deathly Hallows – Part 2 (2011), Skyfall (2012), and Wonder Woman (2017) for which he received Screen Actors Guild Awards in 2012, 2013 and 2017 respectively, as part of a stunt ensemble.

In addition to Justin's role within the film and television stunt industry, he runs a jousting display team,The Knights of the Damned Jousting Stunt Team.

== Biography ==
Having been born into an equestrian family, Justin was involved from a young age with horses. In particular showjumping and mounted games were passions that he took part in, the latter being a discipline in which he represented his country 8 times. Additionally, he was named the Mounted Games Association of Great Britain Champion in 1995 and World Champion Reserve in 2004.

When Justin was 18 years old he toured the world with a professional medieval jousting team which saw him perform in many locations across the globe including St Petersburg, before training to become a stuntman and being accepted onto the British Stunt Register.

== Books ==
In December 2021, Justin pearson authored a book entitled 'Rolling with the Punches' documenting his life as a professional stuntman and stunt coordinator.

== Stunt credits ==
=== Films ===
- 2018 Jungle Book (stunt performer)
- 2017 Wonder Woman (stunt performer)
- 2016 Doctor Strange (stunt performer)
- 2016 The Girl with All the Gifts (stunt performer)
- 2016 Tulip Fever (stunt performer)
- 2016 The Legend of Tarzan (stunt performer)
- 2016 The Hitman's Bodyguard (stunt performer)
- 2016 Now You See Me 2 (stunt performer)
- 2016 Criminal (stunt double: Kevin Costner) / (stunt performer)
- 2016 London Has Fallen (stunt performer: UK)
- 2015 Spectre (stunt double: Rory Kinnear) / (stunt performer)
- 2015 Legend (stunt performer)
- 2015 The Bad Education Movie (stunt performer)
- 2015 The Man from U.N.C.L.E. (stunt performer)
- 2015 Macbeth (stunt performer)
- 2015 Avengers: Age of Ultron (stunt performer)
- 2015 Predator Dark Ages (Short) (horsemaster) / (stunt coordinator) / (stunt performer)
- 2014 The Woman in Black 2: Angel of Death (stunt double) / (stunt double: Jeremy Irvine)
- 2014 Into the Woods (stunt double: The Baker) / (stunt performer)
- 2014 Hercules (stunt performer)
- 2014 Maleficent (stunt performer)
- 2014 Vampire Academy (stunt performer)
- 2014 Jack Ryan: Shadow Recruit (stunt performer)
- 2013 One Chance (stunt performer)
- 2013 RED 2 (stunt performer)
- 2013 Fast & Furious 6 (stunts)
- 2012 Skyfall (stunts)
- 2012 Wrath of the Titans (stunt double: Sam Worthington) / (stunt performer)
- 2011 W.E. (stuntman)
- 2011 Harry Potter and the Deathly Hallows: Part 2 (stunt performer)
- 2011 Pirates of the Caribbean: On Stranger Tides (stunt double) / (stunt double: Captain of the Guard) / (stunt performer)
- 2011 Your Highness (stunt double: Danny McBride) / (stunts)
- 2010 Harry Potter and the Deathly Hallows: Part 1 (stunt performer)
- 2010 Freight (stunt double) / (stunt performer)
- 2010 Tamara Drewe (stunt double)
- 2010 Kick-Ass (stunt performer)
- 2010 The Wolfman (stunt performer)
- 2008 Mamma Mia! (stunt performer)
- 2008 Placebo (stunt double)
- 2007 Boy A (stunt performer)
- 2007 28 Weeks Later (stunt performer)
- 2007 Sunshine (stunt double)
- 2006 Penelope (stunt performer)
- 2002 The Four Feathers (stunts)
- 2002 Reign of Fire (stunts)

=== Television ===
- 2016 Henry VIII and His Six Wives (TV Mini-Series) (stunt coordinator - 1 episode)
- 2016 The Aliens (TV Series) (stunt performer - 1 episode)
- Dickensian (TV Series) (stunt double - 1 episode, 2016) (stunt performer and stunt double - 1 episode, 2016)
- 2015-2016 Mr Selfridge (TV Series) (stunt performer - 2 episodes)
- 2016 Stan Lee's Lucky Man (TV Series) (stunt performer - 2016)
- 2016 Shetland (TV Series) (stunt double - 1 episode)
- 2016 The Secret Agent (TV Series) (stunt coordinator - 1 episode)
- 2015 Legends (TV Series) (stunt double - 1 episode)
- 2015 And Then There Were None (TV Mini-Series) (stunt coordinator - 1 episode)
- 2015 Jekyll & Hyde (TV Series) (stunts - 1 episode)
- 2015 The Bastard Executioner (TV Series) (stunt performer - 7 episodes)
- Da Vinci's Demons (TV Series) (stunt double - 1 episode, 2015) (stunt performer - 1 episode, 2015)
- 2015 Safe House (TV Series) (stunt double - 1 episode)
- 2015 Stella (TV Series) (stunt performer - 1 episode)
- Father Brown (TV Series) (stunt double - 1 episode, 2015) (stunt performer - 1 episode, 2015)
- 2015 Hollyoaks (TV Series) (stunt double - 1 episode)
- 2014 Peaky Blinders (TV Series) (stunt performer - 3 episodes)
- 2014 The Great Fire (TV Mini-Series) (stunt performer - 1 episode)
- 2014 Keep It in the Family (TV Series) (stunt performer - 2014)
- 2014 Glue (TV Mini-Series) (stunts - 2014)
- 2014 24: Live Another Day (TV Mini-Series) (stunt performer - 4 episodes)
- 2011-2014 Game of Thrones (TV Series) (stunt performer - 3 episodes)
- Jamaica Inn (TV Mini-Series) (stunt performer - 2 episodes, 2014) (stunt double - 1 episode, 2014)
- 2013 Atlantis (TV Series) (stunt performer - 2 episodes)
- 2013 The Guilty (TV Mini-Series) (stunt performer - 2013)
- 2013 Silent Witness (TV Series) (stunt double - 1 episode)
- 2012 Casualty (TV Series) (stunt performer - 1 episode)
- 2011 Merlin (TV Series) (stunt performer - 4 episodes)
- 2010 Upstairs Downstairs (TV Series) (stunt performer - 1 episode)
- 2010 Accused (TV Series) (stunt performer - 1 episode)
- 2010 MI-5 (TV Series) (stunt performer - 1 episode)
- 2010 Identity (TV Series) (stunts - 1 episode)
- 2009 We Are Klang (TV Series) (stunt performer - 1 episode)
- 2009 Minder (TV Series) (stunt performer - 1 episode)
- 2008 Crusoe (TV Series) (stunts - 1 episode)
- 2008 The Wall (TV Series) (stunt performer - 2008, 2010)
- Holby City (TV Series) (stunt performer - 1 episode, 2007) (stunt double - 1 episode, 2007)
- 2007 The Bill (TV Series) (stunt double - 3 episodes)
- 2007 Midsomer Murders (TV Series) (stunt double - 1 episode)
- 2006 The Line of Beauty (TV Mini-Series) (stunt double - 2 episodes)
- 2005 The National Lottery: Come & Have a Go (TV Series) (stunt performer - 2005)
- 2001 The Hunt (TV Movie) (stunt double: Philip Glenister) / (stunts)
- 2000 Lorna Doone (TV Movie) (stunt performer)
- 2000 Waking the Dead (TV Series) (stunt double)
