= Malcolm Saville =

English author

- Born: Leonard Malcolm Saville; 21 February 1901; Hastings, Sussex, England
- Died: 30 June 1982 (aged 81); Hastings, Sussex, England
- Citizenship: British
- Occupations: Author, literary publicist, editor
- Spouse: Dorothy McCoy
- Children: 4
- Writing career
- Years active: 1943–1982
- Genre: Children's fiction
- Notable work: Lone Pine series

Leonard Malcolm Saville (21 February 1901 – 30 June 1982) was an English writer best known for the Lone Pine series of children's books, many of which are set in Shropshire. His work emphasises location; the books include many vivid descriptions of English countryside, villages and sometimes towns.

== Early life and career ==
He was born in Hastings, Sussex, and was educated at Richmond Hill School, in Richmond, Surrey. His working life began at Oxford University Press in 1918, then continued as a publicist with Cassell & Co (1920–1922), Associated Press (1922–1936), and George Newnes Ltd (1936–1941). He was also the associate editor of My Garden magazine, before taking over editorship of Sunny Stories from Enid Blyton in 1954, when she left to set up her own magazine in direct competition.

Saville's writing career, from 1943 to 1982, was initially a diversion from his working life. His first book, Mystery at Witchend, was set in Shropshire, a county he had first visited in 1936, and was written when his children had been evacuated to the county from the family home in Hertfordshire. It was adapted for BBC radio broadcast in 1943, and was followed by a further 19 children's books in the Lone Pine series, the last one published in 1978. Several of his 90 books were serialised for broadcast on radio, many on Children's Hour, and his 1953 book The Ambermere Treasure, part of the Jillies series, was serialised by Associated-Rediffusion, the first commercial television company to broadcast in the United Kingdom, in late 1955 and early 1956; it was therefore one of the first ITV children's drama series. Saville also wrote many short stories and magazine articles.

== Personal life ==
His marriage to Dorothy (née McCoy) in 1926 produced four children. Saville had strong moral convictions, and was a practising Christian.

He died in Hastings in 1982, aged 81.

== Book list ==
All dates in the list below refer to the first date of publication. Some of the earlier titles were reissued in revised editions in the late 1960s and early 1970s. Some of the books were translated into Spanish and Dutch.

=== Lone Pine series ===
- Mystery at Witchend (1943)
- Seven White Gates (1944)
- The Gay Dolphin Adventure (1945)
- The Secret of Grey Walls (1947)
- Lone Pine Five (1949)
- The Elusive Grasshopper (1951)
- The Neglected Mountain (1953)
- Saucers Over The Moor (1955)
- Wings Over Witchend (1956)
- Lone Pine London (1957)
- The Secret of the Gorge (1958)
- Mystery Mine (1959)
- Sea Witch Comes Home (1960)
- Not Scarlet But Gold (1962)
- Treasure at Amorys (1964)
- Man With Three Fingers (1966)
- Rye Royal (1969)
- Strangers at Witchend (1970)
- Where's My Girl? (1972)
- Home To Witchend (1978)

=== Buckingham series ===
- The Master of Maryknoll (1950)
- The Buckinghams at Ravenswyke (1952)
- The Long Passage (1954)
- A Palace for the Buckinghams (1963)
- The Secret of the Villa Rosa (1971)
- Diamond in the Sky (1974)

=== Jillies series ===
- Redshank's Warning (1948)
- Two Fair Plaits (1948); reprinted as Secret in the Mist in 1952, but reverted to its original title for subsequent editions.
- Strangers at Snowfell (1949)
- The Sign of the Alpine Rose (1950)
- The Luck of Sallowby (1952)
- The Ambermere Treasure (1953)

=== Nettleford series ===
- All Summer Through (1951)
- Christmas at Nettleford (1953)
- Spring Comes To Nettleford (1954)
- The Secret of Buzzard Scar (1955)

=== Marston Baines series ===
- Three Towers in Tuscany (1963)
- The Purple Valley (1964)
- Dark Danger (1965)
- White Fire (1966)
- Power of Three (1968)
- The Dagger and the Flame (1970)
- Marston – Master Spy (1978)

=== Susan and Bill series ===
- Susan, Bill and the Wolf Dog (1954)
- Susan, Bill and the Ivy-Clad Oak (1954)
- Susan, Bill and the Vanishing Boy (1955)
- Susan, Bill and the Golden Clock (1955)
- Susan, Bill and the 'Saucy Kate' (1956)
- Susan, Bill and the Dark Stranger (1956)
- Susan, Bill and the Bright Star Circus (1960)
- Susan, Bill and the Pirates Bold (1961)

=== Michael and Mary series ===
- Trouble at Townsend (1945) – when it was first published, this book was filmed by the Rank Organisation starring a young Petula Clark.
- The Riddle of the Painted Box (1947)
- The Flying Fish Adventure (1950)
- The Secret of the Hidden Pool (1953)
- Where The Bus Stopped (1955) – actually a short story which was published as a book in its own right, although it also appeared in anthologies.
- Young Johnnie Bimbo (1956)
- The Fourth Key (1957)

=== Brown Family series ===
- Four And Twenty Blackbirds (1959) – retitled The Secret of Galleybird Pit in editions published after 1967.
- Good Dog Dandy (1971)
- The Roman Treasure Mystery (1973)

=== Other fiction books ===
- Treasure at the Mill (1957)
- The Thin Grey Man (1966)

=== Travel books ===
- Come to London (1967)
- Come to Devon (1969)
- Come to Cornwall (1969)
- Come to Somerset (1970)
- Portrait of Rye (1976)
- The Silent Hills of Shropshire (1998)

=== Nature and countryside books ===
- Country Scrapbook for Boys and Girls (1944)
- Open Air Scrapbook for Boys and Girls (1945)
- Seaside Scrapbook for Boys and Girls (1946)
- Jane's Country Year (1946)
- Small Creatures (1959)
- Malcolm Saville's Country Book (1961) – an updated revision and expansion of the Country Scrapbook and Open Air Scrapbook.
- Malcolm Saville's Seaside Book (1962) – a similar updated revision and expansion of the Seaside Scrapbook.
- See How It Grows (1971)
- Eat What You Grow (1975)
- The Countryside Quiz (1978)
- The Wonder Why Book of Exploring a Wood (1978)
- The Wonder Why Book of Exploring the Seashore (1979)
- The Wonder Why Book of Wild Flowers Through the Year (1980)
- The Seashore Quiz (1981)

=== Religious books ===
- King of Kings (1958)
- Strange Story (1967)

=== Other non-fiction ===
- The Adventure of the Lifeboat Service (1950)
- The Coronation Gift Book for Boys and Girls (1952) – Although written for children to enable them to understand the process of Queen Elizabeth II's coronation, the book was informative enough for it to be read by adults as well.
- The Story of Winchelsea Church (1978)

Saville also edited Words For All Seasons, a poetry anthology first published in 1979. He began a book on the Shropshire countryside he loved, The Silent Hills of Shropshire, but died before he could finish it; it was completed by Mark O'Hanlon and published in 1998. Mark O'Hanlon's biography of Saville, Beyond the Lone Pine which was published to coincide with the centenary of Saville's birth in 2001, is also now out of print. Another book by Mark O'Hanlon called The Complete Lone Pine – a guide to the entire series – was published in 1996 and was reprinted in an extended hardback edition in 2005.
