= Sibdon Carwood =

Hamlet in Shropshire, England

Coordinates: 52.443°N 2.866°W

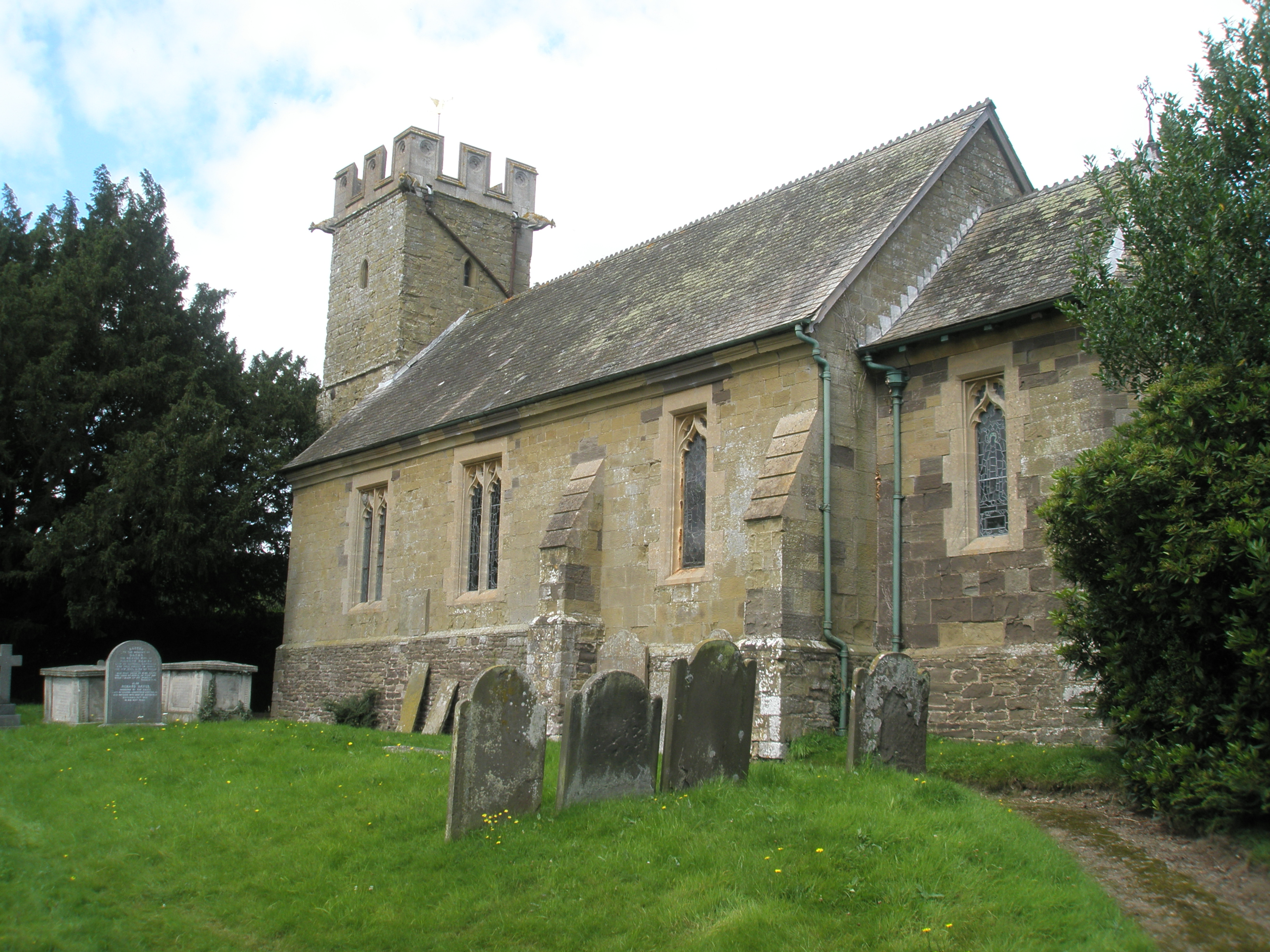
- St. Michael's Church

- Location within Shropshire
- Population: 82 (2001 Census)
- OS grid reference: SO412831
  - London: 153 miles (246 km)
- Civil parish: Sibdon Carwood
- Unitary authority: Shropshire
- Ceremonial county: Shropshire
- Region: West Midlands
- Country: England
- Sovereign state: United Kingdom
- Post town: CRAVEN ARMS
- Postcode district: SY7
- Dialling code: 01588
- Police: West Mercia
- Fire: Shropshire
- Ambulance: West Midlands
- UK Parliament: Ludlow

Sibdon Carwood is a hamlet and parish in Shropshire, England. To the east is the town of Craven Arms.

== Etymology and history ==
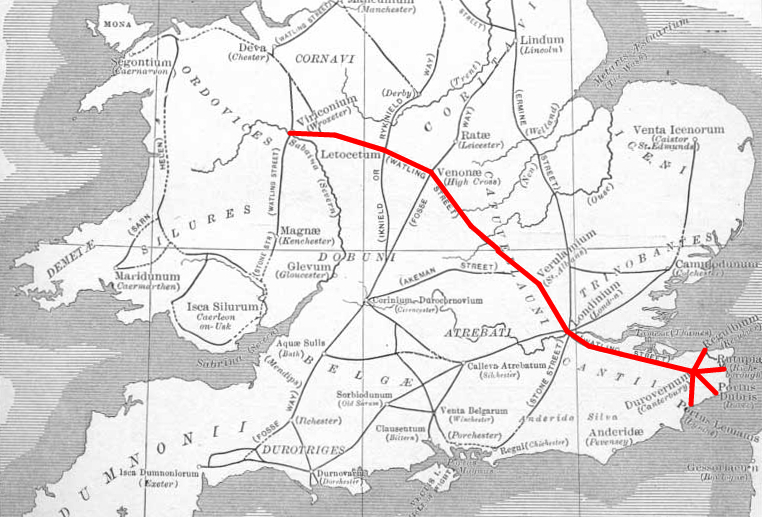
The parish lies on the ancient Watling Street, now a lane.

The place is occasionally written simply with the first part of the name, which has been spelt variously over the centuries. Originally "Sibton" (in the Domesday Book of 1086 it was recorded as "Sibetune"), from Saxon origin meaning "Sibba's farmstead". The second part of the full name, Carwood, means "the wood where the rocks are found". The name Carwood is also given to a wooded slope, north of Wart Hill in the north of Hopesay parish, and to three cottages there.

The Norman barons who locally had their power base at Clun Castle, the de Say (or "Sai") family, held the manor after the Norman conquest of England. During the medieval period, the Welsh Marches was an area of instability and conflict, ruled by the Marcher lords. The Domesday Book records Sibdon as having 6 households, making it quite a small manor population-wise.

The fortified manor at Sibdon Carwood, the predecessor to the 17th-century Sibdon Castle country house, is given the name "Shepeton Corbet" by a number of historical documents, including that of John Leland (c. 1535–43), who also gives the suffix to Hopton Castle and Moreton Corbet castle. This is an indication that the Corbet family owned these fortified manors around the time, of which Moreton Corbet's castle retains the suffix to this day.

About a mile to the north, in the neighbouring hamlet of Cheney Longville, was Cheney Longville Castle.

A description of the parish published in 1848 records that 59 people lived in the parish, which was wholly owned by the Sibdon Castle estate. It also noted a perpetual curacy, with a net income of £50.

Originally the manor of Sibdon was part of the hundred of Rinlau, as recorded in the Domesday Book, however in the 12th century the hundreds of Shropshire were greatly reformed and the parish from then on came within the hundred of Purslow. In 1894 it became part of Ludlow Rural District and then in 1974 the non-metropolitan district of South Shropshire. In 2009 there was another re-organisation of local administration, with the creation of a unitary authority covering most of Shropshire.

The nearby town of Craven Arms is a relatively recent development in the area – it was established only in the mid-19th century, being at the junction of a number of newly-laid railway lines. With much of its recent growth towards the west of the town, its urban area has reached Watling Street and its outskirts fringe into Sibdon Carwood parish.

== The hamlet ==
The community is quite dispersed, though there is a core hamlet at the heart of the Sibdon Castle estate. Once the location of a medieval fortification or manor house, the present Sibdon Castle is not a castle but an early/mid-17th century stone country house, built by the Corbet family. It was modernised in the 18th century and made castellated with battlements added around 1800. To the rear of the house is a courtyard with a stone stable block. It is a Grade II* Listed building.

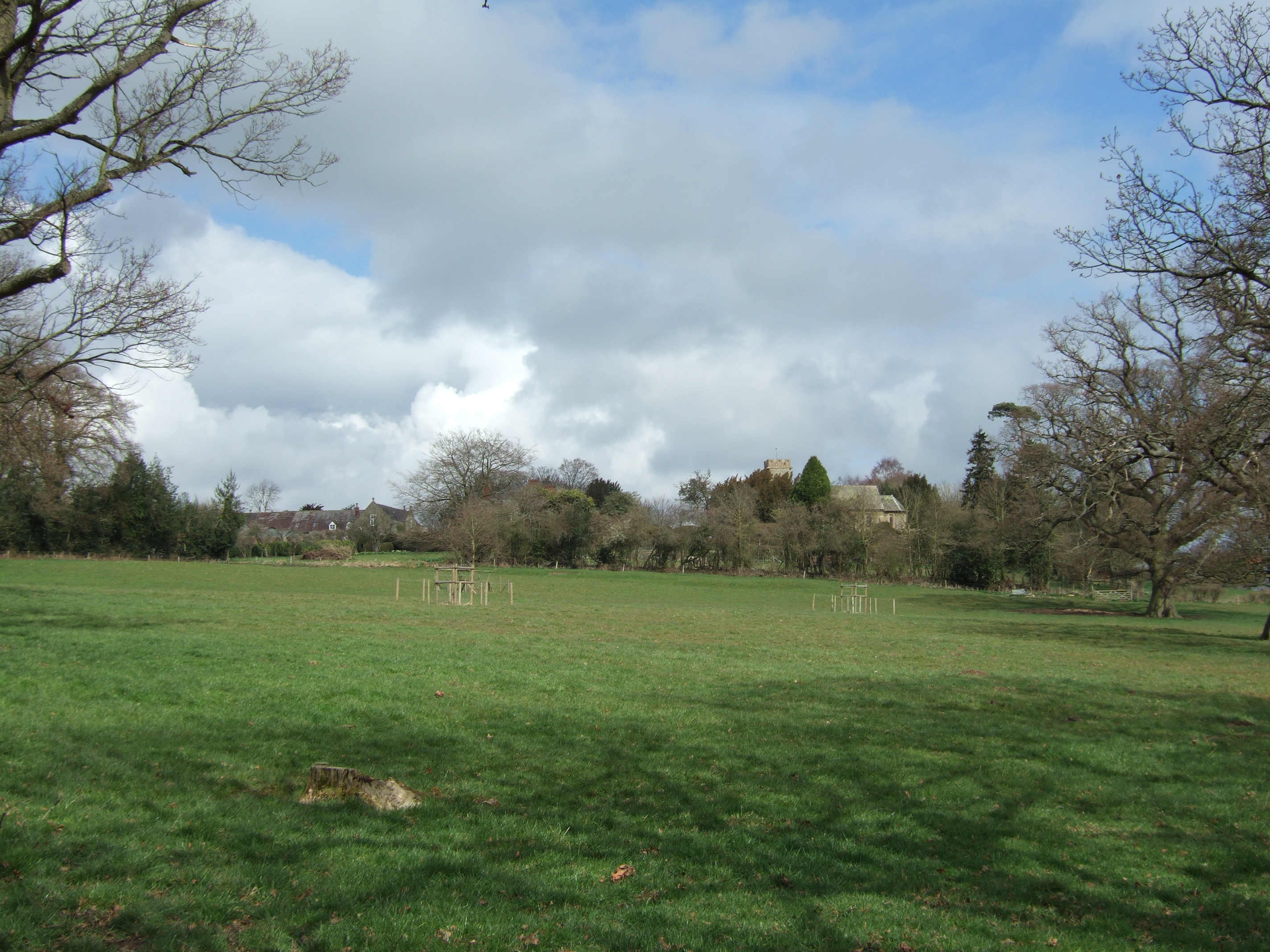
The hamlet at the centre of the Sibdon Castle estate – note the parkland trees

Also within the main hamlet is St Michael's Church, which was rebuilt in 1741; there has been a church here since about 1180. A west tower was added around 1800 and the church was restored, extended and made Gothic, with tower battlements, in 1871–2. The church and a lodge near Sibdon Castle are both Grade II listed. Otherwise the hamlet consists of a farm with its own farmhouse, a small number of cottages and numerous outbuildings. Just to the northeast lies Sibdon Pool, a historic 1.3 hectare fishing pool. A private tree-lined carriage drive connects the main hamlet with the Clun Road (the B4368). A number of public right of ways converge on the hamlet, giving the public access to the church, one of which is part of the "Shropshire Way" and "Wart Hill Wanderer".

== The parish ==
The population of the whole parish was recorded as 82 persons, in 34 households, by the 2001 Census. Instead of a parish council it has a parish meeting; this is due to the very small population of the parish. There is a parish noticeboard on Watling Street. The parish forms part of the Church Stretton and Craven Arms electoral division of Shropshire Council, the local council.

The eastern border of the parish is Watling Street, a Roman road – the other side of this lane is Craven Arms parish. The northern border is Long Lane, with the parish of Wistanstow to the north, whilst to the west is Hopesay Hill and Common. The parish lies on the eastern slope of the hill, between the summit and the town of Craven Arms (where the River Onny flows through); Sibdon Castle itself is at 187 metres above sea level. The western half of the parish, including the main hamlet, lies within the Shropshire Hills AONB, with the lane running through the parish forming the boundary. This western half of the parish is on a steeper gradient and is more wooded, with Sibdon Wood and Oldfield Wood, as well as parkland style trees.

The parish also includes half of the hamlet of Long Meadowend, which is situated in the southwestern corner of the parish, at the junction of the B4367, B4368 and the main lane through the parish, which runs north to Long Lane. (However the junction at Long Meadowend lies in Hopesay parish.) The B4368 road (running from Craven Arms to Clun) and the Heart of Wales Line run through the southern part of the parish, with the nearest railway stations at Broome and Craven Arms.

A small number of holiday cottages now exist in the parish, on Long Lane and Watling Street. Also on Watling Street a farm has diversified since 2004 into an activities centre for children and groups, which has in recent years created large (temporary) outdoor mazes in nearby fields, including corn mazes. Long Lane is part of the "Six Castles Cycleway" and the National Cycle Network route 44.

== See also ==
- Listed buildings in Sibdon Carwood

== References and external links ==
- Geograph – photos of Sibdon Carwood (including inside St Michael's Church)
- Flickr – photo of Sibdon Castle
