= Alcaston =

Coordinates: 52.479°N 2.801°W

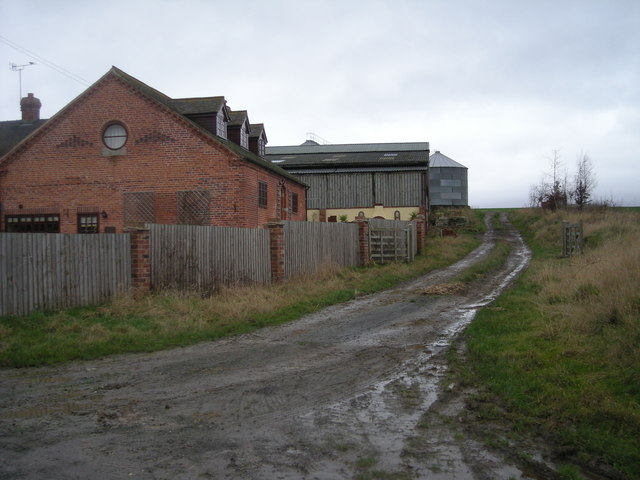
- Path passing Alcaston Barns

- Location within Shropshire
- OS grid reference: SO456871
- Civil parish: Acton Scott
- Unitary authority: Shropshire
- Ceremonial county: Shropshire
- Region: West Midlands
- Country: England
- Sovereign state: United Kingdom
- Post town: CHURCH STRETTON
- Postcode district: SY6
- Dialling code: 01694
- Police: West Mercia
- Fire: Shropshire
- Ambulance: West Midlands
- UK Parliament: Ludlow

Alcaston is a village in Shropshire, England.

== See also ==
- Listed buildings in Acton Scott
