= Marshbrook =

Hamlet in Shropshire, England

Coordinates: 52.503°N 2.824°W

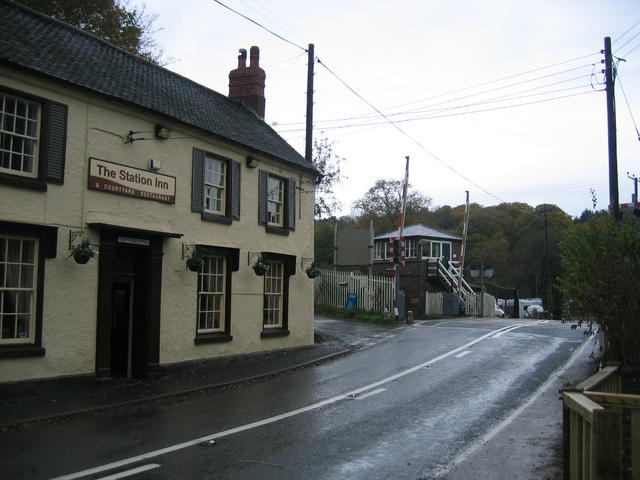
- Marshbrook, including its pub and level crossing

- Location within Shropshire
- Population: 1 9
- OS grid reference: SO440898
- Civil parish: Church Stretton; Wistanstow; Acton Scott
- Unitary authority: Shropshire
- Ceremonial county: Shropshire
- Region: West Midlands
- Country: England
- Sovereign state: United Kingdom
- Post town: CHURCH STRETTON
- Postcode district: SY6
- Dialling code: 01694
- Police: West Mercia
- Fire: Shropshire
- Ambulance: West Midlands
- UK Parliament: South Shropshire

Marshbrook is a hamlet in Shropshire, England. It is sometimes spelt "Marsh Brook", which is also the name of a small watercourse which flows through the area.

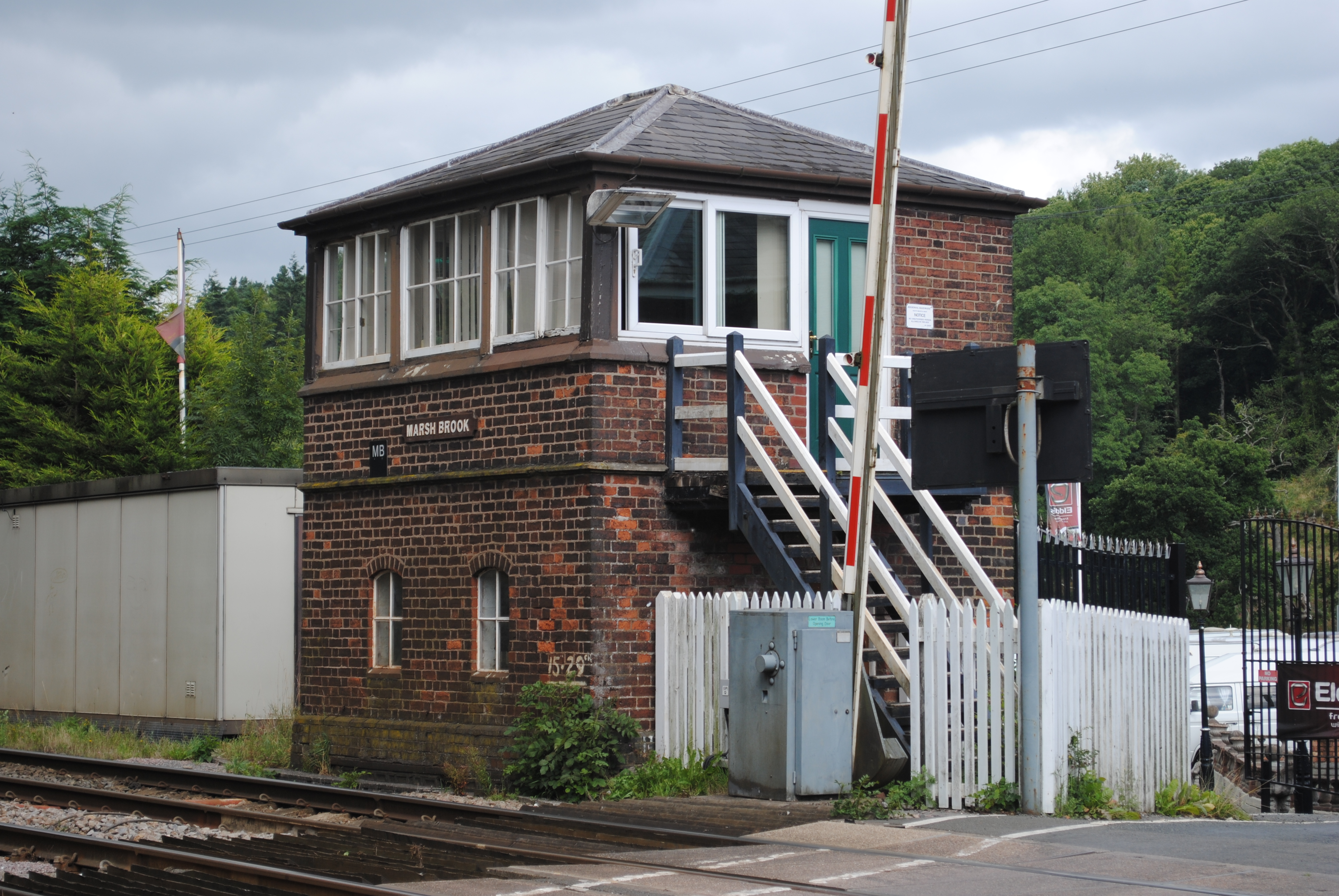
Marshbrook Signal Box

It lies on the junction of the A49 and B4370, 3 miles to the south of the market town of Church Stretton. Three civil parishes come together in the hamlet: Church Stretton, Wistanstow and Acton Scott. The hamlet lies at 163m above sea level at the southern end of the Stretton Gap. A Roman road passed through what is now Marshbrook, on its way from Leintwardine to Wroxeter.

The Welsh Marches Line runs through the hamlet and there was once a small station here. Marshbrook station was constructed in 1852 for the railway company comprising a stationmaster's house, waiting room and ticket office. The station was closed in 1958 and the building was subsequently used as a private house, before it was demolished in 2019. A signal box and level crossing remain. Marshbrook Signal Box is the oldest operational signal box of its type surviving on the national railway network and was built by the London & North Western Railway in 1872. It was made a Grade II listed building in 2013, in order to save it from the planned removal of mechanical signalling on the line.

There is also a public house in the hamlet, near to the railway line, called The Station Inn (previously known as the "Wayside Inn"). A small industrial estate/business park exists on land adjacent to the railway and there are roadside businesses at the A49/B4370 junction.

In 2010 a camping and outdoor activities centre opened at Marshbrook, with mountain bikes available for hire.

One mile to the northwest is the hamlet of Minton and one mile to the east is the village of Acton Scott. The hamlets of Whittingslow and Cwm Head lie to the southwest along the B4370.

== See also ==
- Listed buildings in Acton Scott
- Listed buildings in Church Stretton
