= Woolston, Shropshire =

Woolston is the name of two rural settlements in Shropshire, England:

- Woolston, north Shropshire, near Oswestry
- Woolston, south Shropshire, near Church Stretton and Craven Arms
