= Listed buildings in Wistanstow =

Wistanstow is a civil parish in Shropshire, England. It contains 37 listed buildings that are recorded in the National Heritage List for England. Of these, three are listed at Grade II*, the middle of the three grades, and the others are at Grade II, the lowest grade. The parish contains villages including Wistanstow, Cheney Longville, Felhampton, and Strefford, but is mainly rural. Most of the listed buildings are houses, including two former manor houses, cottages, farmhouses and farm buildings, the earlier of which are timber framed. One of the farms contains material originally part of Cheney Longville Castle. The other listed buildings include two churches and items in a churchyard, a former corn mill converted into houses, four milestones, a former pumphouse, and two telephone kiosks.

== Key ==
Grade	Criteria
II*	Particularly important buildings of more than special interest
II	Buildings of national importance and special interest

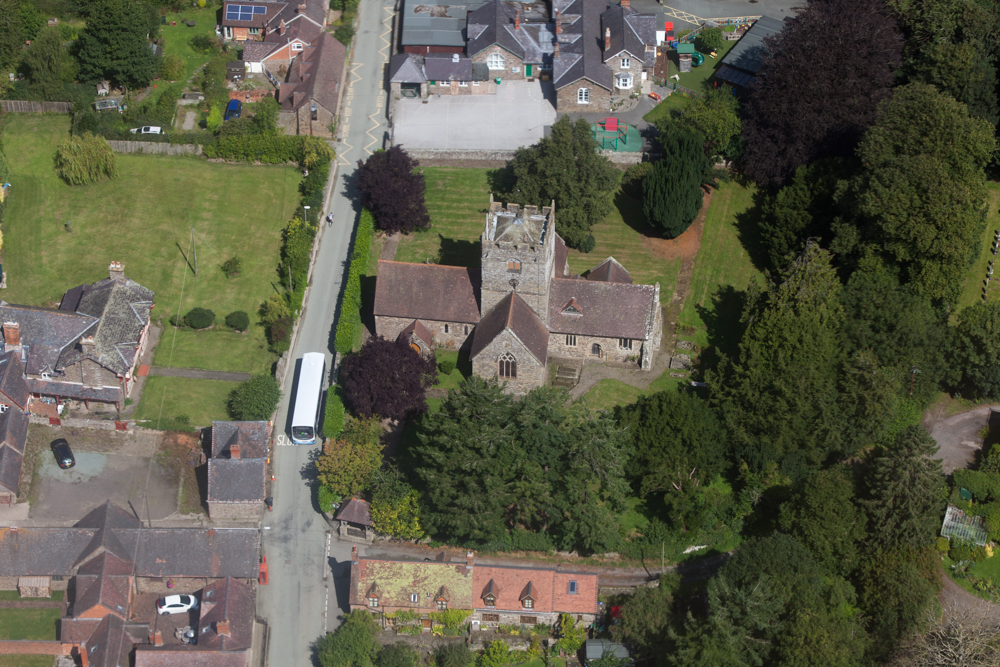
Holy Trinity, Wistanstow

== Buildings ==
Name and location	Photograph	Date	Notes	Grade
Holy Trinity Church; 52.46530°N 2.83709°W		c. 1200	The tower dates from the 14th century with its top stage probably added in 1712. There were later alterations, the church was restored in the 1870s by S. Pountney Smith when the south porch was added, and restored again in 1895, which included the addition of the north vestry. The church is built in sandstone with a tile roof, and has a cruciform plan, consisting of a nave with a south porch, north and south transepts, a chancel with a north vestry, and a tower at the crossing. The tower has three stages, an embattled parapet, a clock face, a sundial and a weathervane. The south doorway is in Transitional style, including dog-tooth decoration.	II*
Castle Farmhouse and outbuildings 52.45795°N 2.85876°W		14th century (probable)	The farmhouse and the outbuildings form four sides of a courtyard, with the farmhouse occupying the north range. The buildings are in sandstone with tile roofs. The farmhouse has two storeys, an attic and a cellar, and three bays, and contains casement windows, some of which are mullioned and transomed, and three gabled dormers. At the rear is an early 19th-century verandah on four Tuscan columns. The outbuildings incorporate medieval material, and contain windows of varying types and ventilation holes.	II*
Range, Castle Farm; 52.45770°N 2.85857°W	—	14th century (probable)	Originally part of Cheney Longville Castle, later used as a farm building, it is in sandstone with a tile roof, and has two storeys. It contains various openings, including chamfered doorways, mullioned windows with chamfered surrounds, and ventilation holes.	II*
Affcot Manor; 52.47231°N 2.80685°W	—	c. 1500	A manor house that originated as a two-bay open hall, a cross wing was added in about 1600, and wings were added to the north and the east in the 18th and 19th centuries. The older parts are timber framed with plaster infill, the later parts are in sandstone and in painted and roughcast brick, and the roofs are tiled. The house is partly in two storeys with a cellar, and partly in one storey with an attic, and it has an L-shaped plan and the added wings. Some windows are sashes, others are casements, and other features include gables with decorative bargeboards and finials, and a gabled half-dormer.	II
The Villa; 52.45874°N 2.85339°W	—	Early 17th century	The house was remodelled in about 1766 and extended in the 19th century, and is in roughcast stone with a tile roof. There are two storeys, three bays, an outshut, and a lower wing on the right. On the front is a porch with a hood on consoles and a small canted bay window, and the other windows are casements.	II
Blossom Cottage; 52.45924°N 2.85553°W	—	17th century	The cottage is partly timber framed with plaster infill, and partly in sandstone, and it has tile roof. There is a single storey and an attic, the windows are casements, and there are two gabled dormers.	II
Cheney Longville House and outbuilding 52.45791°N 2.85386°W	—	17th century	The house has been altered and extended at various times including in 1767 and in 1952. It is in stone with moulded string courses, partly rendered and whitewashed at the rear, and has tiled roofs. There are two storeys and attics, and the plan consists of a hall and gabled cross-wings. On the front is a canted bay window, most of the other windows are casements, there is a cross-window, a central pedimented dormer with a lunette, and at the rear is a timber framed dormer. The attached outbuilding is partly timber framed and partly in stone.	II
Ford Cottage; 52.46541°N 2.82026°W		17th century	The house was extended in the 20th century. It is timber framed with plaster infill, and has a tile roof. There is one storey and an attic, and four bays. The windows are casements, and there are three dormers, the middle one gabled, and the others with flat heads.	II
Forge Cottage and Old Rectory Cottage; 52.46624°N 2.83742°W	—	17th century	The cottages were later extended. The original part is timber framed with plaster infill, the extension is in stone, and the roof is thatched. They have one storey and attics, four bays, and two rear lean-tos. On the front are two gabled porches, the windows are casements, and there are two dormers and one half-dormer.	II
Barn northeast of Lower House Farmhouse; 52.45882°N 2.85508°W	—	17th century	The barn is timber framed with weatherboarding on a sandstone base, and has a corrugated iron roof. There are four bays and various openings.	II
Barn west of Lower House Farmhouse; 52.45862°N 2.85581°W	—	17th century	The barn is timber framed with weatherboarding on a sandstone base, and has a corrugated iron roof. There are various openings at the rear.	II
Manor House (Burley Hall); 52.46329°N 2.83759°W	—	17th century	A farmhouse, service range and coach house, originally timber framed, rebuilt in stone in the 18th century, and extended in the 19th century, they have brick dressings and a tile roof. The house has two storeys and an attic, a U-shaped plan, and a front of five bays. On the front is a gabled porch, a doorway with a moulded surround, and two gabled dormers. The service range has two storeys and three bays, and a projecting wing to the right. The coach house has a stable door with a fanlight, and a hatch door. Most of the windows in all parts are casements, many with segmental heads.	II
Strefford Cottages; 52.46477°N 2.82060°W	—	17th century	A house that was extended in the 19th century and divided into two dwellings. The earlier part is timber framed with plaster infill, the extensions are in sandstone, and the roof is tiled. There are two storeys and a T-shaped plan, with a front of four bays, and a later cross-wing. The doorway has a cambered hood, and the windows are casements.	II
The Cottage; 52.46492°N 2.82115°W	—	17th century	A timber framed house with plaster infill and a tile roof. There is a single storey and an attic, a T-shaped plan, and a single-storey rear wing. The gable on the right is jettied with a chamfered bressumer, and to the left is a gabled dormer. The windows are casements, and on the right return are two dormers.	II
Upper House Farmhouse and Cottage; 52.45899°N 2.85544°W	—	17th century	Originally timber framed, the farmhouse was roughcast in the 19th century, and has been divided into two. The roof is tiled, and in the left gable end is exposed timber framing. There is one storey and an attic, and a front of three bays, the central bay gabled. On the front are two gabled porches, the windows are casements, and in the outer bays are gabled dormers.	II
Malt Cottage; 52.46542°N 2.82076°W		Early 18th century	A house and a former malthouse, they are in sandstone with tile roofs and some slate. The house has one storey and an attic, and one bay, and contains a mullioned and transomed window with a gabled dormer above. The former malthouse projects on the right, it has three storeys, various windows and doorways, and three ventilation openings in the top floor.	II
Brook Cottage and The Cottage; 52.45882°N 2.85437°W	—	18th century	A pair of roughcast houses with a tile roof. There are two storeys and three bays. On the front is a gabled porch, and the windows are casements.	II
Lower House Farmhouse and range 52.45864°N 2.85548°W	—	18th century	The farmhouse is in sandstone and has a tile roof. There are two storeys, three bays, and a gabled rear wing, and on the front is an open porch. Projecting to the right is a three-bay range with the gable facing the road. The windows in both parts are casements.	II
Barn attached to Lower House Farmhouse; 52.45878°N 2.85565°W	—	18th century	The barn is timber framed with weatherboarding on a sandstone base, and has a tile roof. There are various openings in the rear.	II
Affcot Mill Cottages; 52.46755°N 2.81052°W	—	Late 18th century	A corn mill later divided into three houses, it is in sandstone and has tiled roofs. There are two storeys and attics, each house has two bays, and the middle house is taller. The windows are casements, and in the middle house they have Gothic glazing. Also in the middle house is a porch, a doorway with a segmental head, and a blocked hoist door.	II
Felhampton Court; 52.48147°N 2.81862°W	—	Late 18th century	A brick house in Georgian style, with dentilled eaves and a twin-span tile roof with a bellcote. There are three storeys, five bays, the central three bays protruding and gabled, a rear wing, and a single-storey outshut. In the centre is a Venetian window, with a lunette and a tall arched window above, and the other windows are sashes. The doorway has a moulded surround, a fanlight, and a flat lead hood on scrolled brackets. In the rear wing is a half-dormer, and the outshut contains a canted bay window.	II
Jasmine Cottage; 52.45864°N 2.85351°W	—	Late 18th century	The cottage is in stone, whitewashed on the front, and has a tile roof. There are two storeys, three bays, and a lean-to on the left. Above the doorway is a flat stone hood on iron brackets, and the windows are casements.	II
The Dower House; 52.45852°N 2.85483°W		Late 18th century	A farmhouse, later a private house, it is roughcast with stone dressings, quoins, moulded eaves, and a slate roof. There are two storeys, an H-shaped plan, and a front of three bays. The entrance has a flat hood on Roman Doric columns and pilasters, and the windows are a mix of sashes and mullioned and transomed casements.	II
The Round House; 52.48802°N 2.85631°W	—	c. 1790	A school, later a private house, it is in sandstone and has an octagonal tile roof. There are two storeys, the ground floor windows have hood moulds, and there are bands between the floors and at the eaves level.	II
Milestone at NGR SO 430 892; 52.49808°N 2.84106°W		Late 18th or 19th century	The milestone is on the southeast side of the B4370 road. It is in sandstone, and measures about 0.8 metres (2 ft 7 in) by 0.6 metres (2 ft 0 in) by 0.15 metres (5.9 in). It is inscribed with the distances in miles to Bishops Castle and to Marshbrook.	II
Milestone near Felhampton Court; 52.48099°N 2.81934°W		18th or early 19th century	The milestone is on the east side of the A49 road, and is in sandstone. It consists of a slab with a semicircular head, and is inscribed with the distance in miles to Ludlow Cross in Roman numerals.	II
Stock barn and wagon shed, Lower House Farm; 52.45896°N 2.85614°W	—	1810	The former stock barn is in stone with a tile roof. There is one storey and a loft, and two bays, and it contains various openings and entrances. Attached to the west is a former wagon shed.	II
Milestone at NGR SO 415 859; 52.46875°N 2.86281°W	—	Early 19th century	The milestone is on the northeast side of the A489 road. It is in painted limestone, with a semicircular head, and is about 1 metre (3 ft 3 in) high and 0.7 metres (2 ft 4 in) wide. The millstone is inscribed with the distances in miles to Bishops Castle and to Craven Arms, and it also has a benchmark.	II
Milestone at NGR SO 442 858; 52.46688°N 2.82409°W		Early to mid 19th century	The milestone is on the southeast side of the A49 road. It is in sandstone, about 0.5 metres (1 ft 8 in) above the ground, and has a cambered head. The milestone is inscribed with the distance in miles to Ludlow Cross in Roman numerals.	II
Gates to Cemetery; 52.46589°N 2.83736°W	—	c. 1836–75	The double gates and gate piers are in cast iron. The gates are ornamental, and the piers have Gothic detailing.	II
St Michael's Church; 52.49316°N 2.85087°W		1846–49	Built as a church and schoolroom, it is in sandstone with a slate roof, and is in Neo-Norman style. The church consists of a nave with a west porch, a chancel with an apse, and a tower at the north side of the chancel, incorporating a vestry in the base. The tower has two stages, a dentilled cornice, and an octagonal broach spire, and the openings in the church have round heads.	II
Pumphouse; 52.46490°N 2.82092°W	—	Mid 19th century	The parish pumphouse is in sandstone, and has a pyramidal tile roof with a finial. It contains two doors with chamfered surrounds, and a fixed window.	II
Stone in churchyard 52.46529°N 2.83685°W	—	1877	The stone in the churchyard of Holy Trinity Church is triangular and has a faceted top. It is inscribed with details of the drainage system of the churchyard.	II
Lychgate; 52.46500°N 2.83737°W		c. 1885	The lychgate at the entry to the church yard of Holy Trinity Church has a stone plinth, a pierced timber framed superstructure, and a hipped tile roof with a cross finial. On the sides are wrought iron screens, it contains a pair of gates, and inside there are stones seats.	II
The Grove Lodge; 52.44834°N 2.83748°W	—	1897	The house is in timber framing and brick with a pyramidal tile roof. There are two storeys, and a triangular plan, each front gabled. In the centre is an open porch over which is a mullioned and transomed oriel window on scrolled brackets, under a carved bressumer. The other fronts have sandstone bay windows.	II
Grove Lodge (north); 52.45801°N 2.83573°W		c. 1898	The house is in timber framing and brick with stone dressings, and has a tile roof with moulded bargeboards and decorative terracotta ridge crestings and finials. The house is in Jacobean style, and has two storeys and a front of two gabled bays with canted oriel windows. The right return is gabled and has a canted bay window, and in the angle is an open porch. The windows are mullioned and transomed.	II
K6 telephone kiosk, Cheney Longville; 52.45866°N 2.85408°W		1935	A K6 type telephone kiosk, designed by Giles Gilbert Scott. Constructed in cast iron with a square plan and a dome, it has three unperforated crowns in the top panels.	II
K6 telephone kiosk, Wistanstow; 52.46493°N 2.83749°W		1935	A K6 type telephone kiosk, designed by Giles Gilbert Scott. Constructed in cast iron with a square plan and a dome, it has three unperforated crowns in the top panels.	II
