= Whittingslow =

Hamlet in Shropshire, England

Coordinates: 52.496°N 2.838°W

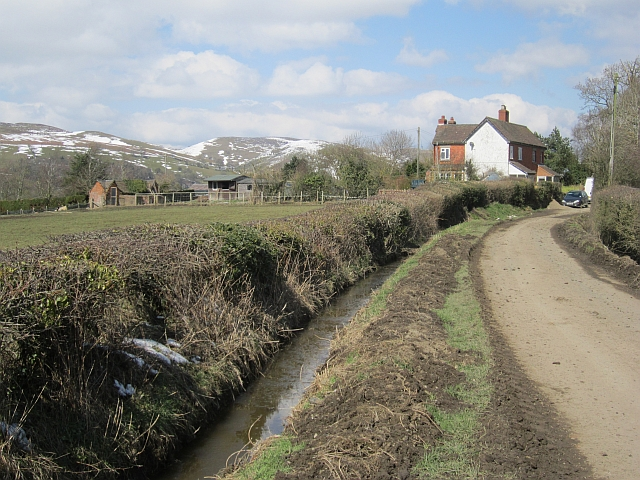
- Lane, Whittingslow

- Location within Shropshire
- OS grid reference: SO431890
- Civil parish: Wistanstow
- Unitary authority: Shropshire
- Ceremonial county: Shropshire
- Region: West Midlands
- Country: England
- Sovereign state: United Kingdom
- Post town: CHURCH STRETTON
- Postcode district: SY6
- Dialling code: 01694
- Police: West Mercia
- Fire: Shropshire
- Ambulance: West Midlands
- UK Parliament: Ludlow

Whittingslow is a hamlet in Shropshire, England.

It is located in the parish of Wistanstow, just off the B4370 road, between Marshbrook and Cwm Head. The hamlet lies on a hilltop, at 252m above sea level. The lane from the B4370 continues, along a ridge of hills, to the hamlet of Woolston in the southwest and then on to the village of Wistanstow itself.
