= Wistanstow Halt railway station =

Former railway station in Shropshire, England

Wistanstow Halt
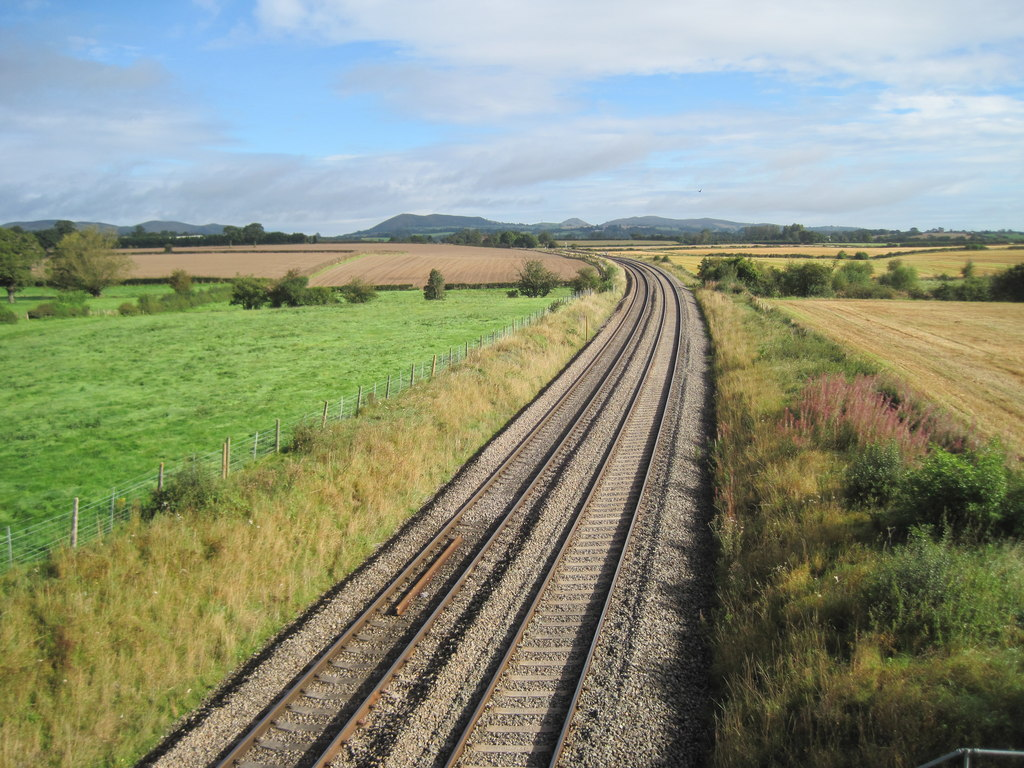
- The site of the station in 2012

General information
- Location: Wistanstow, Shropshire; England
- Coordinates: 52.4636°N 2.8315°W
- Grid reference: SO436854
- Platforms: 2

Other information
- Status: Disused

History
- Original company: Shrewsbury and Hereford Railway

Key dates
- 7 May 1934: Opened
- 11 June 1956: Closed
Location

Wistanstow Halt railway station was a station in Wistanstow, Shropshire, England. The station was opened in 1934 and closed in 1956.

Preceding station	Disused railways	Following station
Marshbrook; Line open, station closed	LMSR and GWR joint Shrewsbury and Hereford Railway	Craven Arms; Line and station open
