= Hamperley =

Hamlet in Shropshire, England

Coordinates: 52.498°N 2.856°W

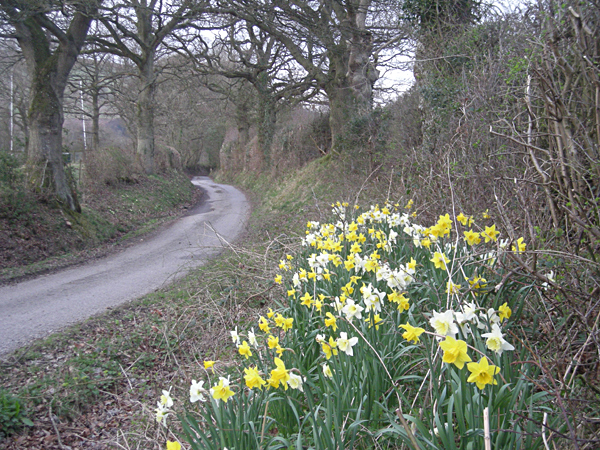
- Lane leading north from Hamperley crossroads to Minton

- Location within Shropshire
- OS grid reference: SO418892
- Civil parish: Church Stretton
- Unitary authority: Shropshire
- Ceremonial county: Shropshire
- Region: West Midlands
- Country: England
- Sovereign state: United Kingdom
- Post town: CHURCH STRETTON
- Postcode district: SY6
- Dialling code: 01694
- Police: West Mercia
- Fire: Shropshire
- Ambulance: West Midlands
- UK Parliament: Ludlow

Hamperley is a dispersed hamlet in Shropshire, England.

It is mainly located in the parish of Church Stretton, 2 1/2 miles southwest of Little Stretton and 4 miles from the market town of Church Stretton. The parishes of Church Stretton, Wistanstow and Lydbury North come together at Hamperley and some dwellings, at Hamperley Plantation, are in the Wistanstow parish, whilst Little Hamperley is just within the Lydbury North parish.

At the centre of the hamlet lies a crossroads of four lanes: one leads to the B4370 road, half a mile southeast at Cwm Head; another leads to the hamlet of Minton, 1 1/4 miles to the northeast; the third leads to Priors Holt and Churchmoor, to the west; and the fourth is a green lane heading to farms to the southwest. The centre of Hamperley lies at 233m above sea level. The area is very rural and is at the southern end of the Long Mynd hill range.

There is an outdoors activity centre located on the lane between Minton and Hamperley, the Longmynd Adventure Camp, with overnight accommodation and camping ground. There is also a low impact campsite at http://hamperleycampsite.co.uk.

== Nearby minor localities ==
Churchmoor, Priors Holt and Priors Holt Hill are just to the west of the hamlet and the hill rises to 383m. They form part of Lydbury North parish.

On Churchmoor Hill lies the Botley Stone, the remains of a Bronze Age ring cairn (shown as a tumulus on Ordnance Survey Explorer maps). It lies on the border of Lydbury North and Myndtown parishes, at 394m ASL. A bridleway leads up to it from Churchmoor. The Botley Stone is just one of a number of tumuli in the area.

Hamperley Farm was renamed "Ingles farm" in children's author Malcolm Saville's popular "Lone Pine" series.
