= Upper Affcot =

Hamlet in Shropshire, England

Coordinates: 52.473°N 2.820°W

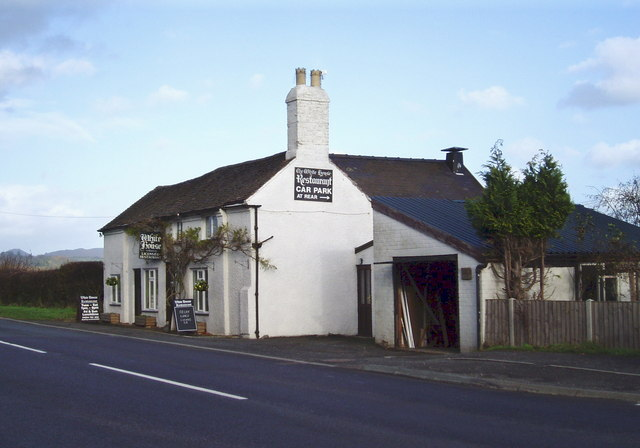
- The White House restaurant, Upper Affcot

- Location within Shropshire
- OS grid reference: SO443864
- Civil parish: Wistanstow
- Unitary authority: Shropshire
- Ceremonial county: Shropshire
- Region: West Midlands
- Country: England
- Sovereign state: United Kingdom
- Post town: CHURCH STRETTON
- Postcode district: SY6
- Dialling code: 01694
- Police: West Mercia
- Fire: Shropshire
- Ambulance: West Midlands
- UK Parliament: Ludlow

Upper Affcot is a hamlet in Shropshire, England.

It is located on the A49 north of Craven Arms and south of Church Stretton, between the hamlets of Strefford and Felhampton. There is a public house here, formerly called the Travellers Rest, now the Affcot Lodge. It is part of the civil parish of Wistanstow.
