= Listed buildings in Church Stretton =

Church Stretton is a civil parish in Shropshire, England. It contains 88 listed buildings that are recorded in the National Heritage List for England. Of these, one is listed at Grade I, the highest of the three grades, four are at Grade II*, the middle grade, and the others are at Grade II, the lowest grade. The parish stretches along a valley between hills to the east and west. The major settlement is the market town of Church Stretton, with the village of All Stretton to the north, and the village of Little Stretton, and the smaller settlements of Marshbrook and Minton to the south. In the surrounding countryside are farms, and a number of farmhouses and farm buildings are listed. In the settlements most of the listed buildings are houses, cottages and associated structures. Also listed are churches and items in and around the churchyards, shops, public houses, two milestones and a milepost, a signal box, and two war memorials.

== Key ==
Grade	Criteria
I	Buildings of exceptional interest, sometimes considered to be internationally important
II*	Particularly important buildings of more than special interest
II	Buildings of national importance and special interest

== Buildings ==
Name and location	Photograph	Date	Notes	Grade
Sundial; 52.53803°N 2.80878°W		Medieval	The sundial is in the churchyard of St Laurence's Church, and has been converted from a churchyard cross. It is in sandstone and consists of part of the shaft set into a circular base originally a mill wheel. There is a brass dial but the gnomon is missing.	II
St Laurence's Church; 52.53816°N 2.80877°W		15th century	The oldest part of the church is the nave which is in Norman style. Most of the rest of the church dates from the 13th century and it is in Early English style. The top stage of the tower was added in the 15th century and is in Perpendicular style. The vestry was added in 1831, and in 1867–68 S. Pountney Smith carried out a restoration and added aisles to the transepts. The church is built in stone with tile roofs, and has a cruciform plan consisting of a nave and a chancel, north and south transepts, each with a west aisle, and a tower at the crossing. The tower has three stages, diagonal buttresses, a clock face on the east side, and an embattled parapet with gargoyles, corner finials, and a tiled pyramidal roof.	I
Long Mynd House; 52.51181°N 2.84050°W		15th century	The house was extended in the 17th century, and was restored and altered in the 20th century. It is partly timber framed with brick and rendered infill, partly in stone, and partly rendered, and has a tile roof. The house consists of a two-bay two-storey hall range, and a cross-wing with two bays, and one storey with an attic. The windows are casements, and in the southeast gable end is a truncated cruck truss.	II
The Manor House, Little Stretton; 52.52151°N 2.82161°W		15th century	A farmhouse, later a private house, it was extended in the 17th century and heavily restored in the 20th century. The original part is timber framed with rendered infill on a stone plinth, the extensions are in brick, and the roof is tiled. There are two storeys, and the house has an H-shaped plan, with a long main range and a gabled cross-wing at each end. The doorway has panelled pilasters, and a moulded pediment. The gables are jettied, and the windows are casements. Inside the house is a three-bay cruck-house.	II*
Bircher Cottage; 52.52026°N 2.82149°W	—	c. 1500	A house that was extended to the front in 1927, and to the rear in 1983. The original part is timber framed, the extensions are in stone, partly roughcast and partly rendered, and the roofs are partly tiled and partly slated. The original part has two bays, one of which is a cross-wing, with extensions on each side. It has a single storey and an attic, and the windows are casements. Inside the original part is a full cruck truss.	II
Old Hall Farmhouse, Little Stretton; 52.52066°N 2.82375°W	—	16th century	Originally a manor house, later a farmhouse, it is partly in stone and partly timber framed, and partly on a plinth, with a tile roof. There are two storeys with attics, an E-shaped front with three gables, the middle gable recessed. In the left gable are mullioned and transomed windows, the middle gable contains a casement window in a segmental arch, and there is a small stone gabled porch, and in the right gable are casement windows with segmental arches.	II
The Malt House; 52.52009°N 2.82145°W	—	16th century	A timber framed house with brick and rendered infill, and a 20th-century extension to the right in brick, all with a tile roof. On the left is a projecting gabled wing, and to the right is a three-bay range. The windows are casements. There is a door to the left with a tiled lean-to porch, and a central doorway with a pediment.	II
The Tan House; 52.52037°N 2.82196°W		16th century	Originally a tannery, later a private house, it was altered and extended in about 1910 by Derwent Wood. The earlier part is timber framed, the extensions are in stone, and the roof is tiled. There are two storeys and an attic, and the house has a three-bay core and a cross-wing. On the front is a projecting gable containing a casement window, and a projecting porch with an ornamental thatched roof. To the right is a canted bay window above which is a dormer with a hipped roof. To the left is a recessed stone wing containing a large gabled jettied dormer with mullioned windows on three sides. In the right return is an oriel window.	II*
Old Hall Farmhouse, All Stretton; 52.55265°N 2.79712°W	—	1564	The older part of the farmhouse is the cross-wing facing the road, the hall range being built in 1630. The farmhouse is timber framed with brick infill, rendered at the rear, and it has a tile roof. There is a T-shaped plan with a three-bay hall range, and a two-bay cross-wing. The gable end of the cross-wing has a jettied upped floor with a chamfered bressumer. The house has one mullioned window, the other windows are casements, and the central doorway has a lean-to tiled porch.	II
Tudor Cottage; 52.53631°N 2.80925°W		Late 16th century	The house was altered in the 17th century and remodelled in the 18th century. It is timber framed with brick infill on a stone plinth, it has stone side and rear walls, and a tile roof. There are two storeys, and an L-shaped plan with a two-bay hall range and a cross-wing. The gable end faces the street, and its upper storeys and gable are jettied with carved bressumers. The windows are casements.	II*
Brook Cottages; 52.52167°N 2.82423°W		c. 1600	A pair of timber framed cottages with brick infill on a stone plinth with a tile roof. There is a single storey and an attic, and four bays and a reduced extension bay. The windows are casements.	II
The Bucks Head Public House; 52.53788°N 2.80817°W		c. 1600	Originally a manor house, later altered and extended for use as a public house. It is in red brick, partly on a plinth, with stone dressings, quoins, string courses, a parapet, and tile roofs. In the centre is the cross-wing of the manor house, with its gable end facing the street, to the left is a recessed smaller gable, and to the left of that is a 17th-century extension. To the right of the gabled wing is a 20th-century extension. The gabled wing contains some diapering and mullioned and transomed windows.	II
The Manor House, All Stretton; 52.55560°N 2.79773°W	—	c. 1600	A farmhouse, later a private house, it was altered in the 18th century, and considerably remodelled in the 1920s. It is partly timber framed with painted panels, partly in render painted to resemble timber framing, and partly in unpainted stone. It has a tile roof with a parapeted east gable and three ball finials. There are two storeys, and a basic plan of a three-bay hall range, a three-bay cross-wing, and later extension wings. The gable end has a jettied upper floor with a bressumer. The windows are casements with lattice glazing.	II
Well Cottage; 52.51073°N 2.84261°W	—	c. 1600	The cottage is timber framed with rendered infill and a tile roof. There is a large detached stone chimney to the left. The cottage has an L-shaped plan, part has one storey, and the other part has one storey and an attic. The front gable is twice-jettied, and has a mullioned and transomed window in the ground floor and a three-light casement window in the attic.	II
The Ancient House No. 1; 52.52197°N 2.82195°W		Late 16th or early 17th century	Originally a posting house and inn, later a private house, it is partly timber framed with brick infill and partly in stone, and has a tile roof. There are two storeys and four bays, a projecting porch, and casement windows.	II
1603; 52.55414°N 2.79960°W	—	1603	A timber framed cottage with painted infill, weatherboarded at the west end, with a tile roof and roof lights. It has one storey and an attic, and a later lean-to at the east. Most of the windows are casements, there is an oriel window in the east wall, and a mullioned window at the rear. On the front, one panel is inscribed with the date and another has a fleur-de-lis motif.	II
24 High Street; 52.53828°N 2.80803°W		Early 17th century	At one time an inn, and later used for other purposes, the building is timber framed with brick infill, and was extended in the 19th century with brick painted to resemble timber framing. The roof is partly tiled and partly slated, and there are two storeys and an attic. The original range has four bays and contains a central pedimented porch, the extension forming a gabled cross-wing to the north. The windows in both parts are mullioned and transomed.	II
Greengates; 52.53679°N 2.80856°W	—	Early 17th century	The house was remodelled in the 18th century. It is in brick with stone quoins, brick dentil course eaves, and a tile roof. At the rear is a timber framed wing with rendered infill on a stone plinth. There are two storeys, a front of two bays, a central flat-roofed porch with plain columns, and above the door is a fanlight. Over the porch is a rendered panel, and the windows are casements, those in the ground floor with segmental heads.	II
13 and 15 High Street; 52.53860°N 2.80774°W		17th century	At one time a public house, later converted into two shops, it is timber framed and partly rendered, and has a tile roof. There is one storey and attics, and it has an L-shaped plan consisting of a range parallel to the street and a gabled cross-wing to the left. In the ground floor are 19th-century shop fronts, and above the main range is a large gabled dormer. Both gables contain casement windows.	II
49 and 49A High Street; 52.53750°N 2.80811°W		17th century	Originally a coach house, later converted for other purposes, the building is timber framed with infill partly in brick and partly rendered. The roof is tiled, there are two storeys and an attic at the rear. In the ground floor are two doorways in the centre flanked by 20th-century shop windows, and to the right are the remains of a mullioned window. In the upper floor is one sash window and two casement windows.	II
54 and 56 High Street; 52.53740°N 2.80843°W	—	17th century	Originally an inn and a house, later a shop and a house, it is in stone with a tile roof. There is a rectangular plan parallel to the street and rear wings, and two storeys. In the upper floor are small-paned casement windows. No. 56 has two 19th-century mullioned and transomed windows and a doorway, all under a moulded fascia on consoles. No. 54 to the right has a shop front and a doorway.	II
Barn and cowsheds near All Saints Church; 52.52175°N 2.82207°W	—	17th century	The oldest building is the barn, the cowsheds dating from the 18th and 19th centuries. The barn and the south cowshed are timber framed and weatherboarded on a stone plinth, with tile roofs, the barn having four bays. The north cowshed is in stone.	II
Botvyle Farmhouse; 52.56045°N 2.77390°W	—	17th century	The oldest part is at the rear, consisting of three timber framed rear wings, the front range dating from the early 19th century. The farmhouse is rendered, the front range has a hipped slated roof, and at the rear the roof is tiled. There are two storeys, a front of three bays. The central round-headed doorway has pilasters, a fanlight and a bracketed flat hood. The windows on the front are sashes, and elsewhere they are casements.	II
Farm buildings, Botvyle Farm; 52.56069°N 2.77368°W	—	17th century	The oldest part is a timber framed and weatherboarded barn on a stone plinth, with a tile roof, two storeys and six bays. The north gable end is in brick. To the south is an open connecting bay linking with an 18th-century cross-wing containing a cowshed and a stable. This is in brick on a stone plinth and has a tiled roof with parapet gables. (Note: Street View in April 2009 shows that the farm buildings have been converted into holiday accommodation.)	II
Barn, cowshed and store, Brook Farm; 52.52168°N 2.82389°W	—	17th century	The barn is the oldest part, the other parts dating from the 19th century. The barn is timber framed and weatherboarded on a stone plinth with a tile roof. The cowshed has a similar structure with a stone west wall and a corrugated iron roof, and the store is in stone with brick dressings and has a metal corrugated roof.	II
Courtyard Cottage; 52.52135°N 2.82167°W		17th century	Originally a farm building, later converted into a house, it is timber framed with brick infill on a stone plinth. The gable ends are in brick and stone, and the roof is tiled. There is one storey and two bays, and the windows are casements.	II
Ivanhoe; 52.51130°N 2.84079°W	—	17th century	A timber framed house with rendered infill on a stone plinth with a tile roof. It has one storey and an attic, an L-shaped plan, a dormer, and a lean-to extension in the angle.	II
Kings Arms Public House; 52.53732°N 2.80823°W		17th century	The public house is partly timber framed and partly roughcast, with a tile roof. There are two storeys and three bays, with the gable end facing the street, and another bay to the right. The windows are casements, mostly multi-paned. In the gable end is a doorway with pilasters and a four-light fanlight, and to the right is a flat-roofed bay window.	II
Lower Botvyle; 52.55921°N 2.77667°W	—	17th century	A farmhouse, later a private house, it was extended and restored in the 19th and 20th centuries. It has two storeys, the lower storey is in stone, the upper storey is timber framed with painted infill, and the roof is tiled. Originally it had a T-shaped plan consisting of a hall range and a gabled cross-wing to the right, and a further long wing has been added to the right. All the windows are 20th-century casements.	II
Manor Cottage; 52.52124°N 2.82161°W	—	17th century	The cottage is in brick on a stone plinth in the lower part, it is timber framed with brick infill above, and has a thatched roof. There are two storeys and an attic, and two bays. Above the door is a thatched canopy, and the windows are casements with segmental heads.	II
Old Barn; 52.53773°N 2.80803°W		17th century	A barn converted into a shop in the 1970s, it is timber framed on a stone plinth, with rendered infill and a tile roof. There are two storeys and a front of four bays. There is a central doorway, and some of the ground floor panels have been converted into windows.	II
Spring Cottage; 52.53924°N 2.80819°W	—	17th century	The house was restored in the 18th century, and altered in the 20th century. It is roughcast with a tile roof, hipped to the west. There are two storeys, a front of three bays, and an extension on the left with a stepped parapet. It has a trellised porch, three canted bay windows with slate roofs in the ground floor, casement windows in the upper floor, and a mullioned and transomed window in the extension.	II
The Ancient House No. 2; 52.52207°N 2.82195°W		17th century	The house is in stone, partly rendered. It has two bays, one of which has a tile roof and the other a slate roof. There are two storeys, a single-storey extension at the rear, and the windows are casements.	II
Yew Tree Inn Public House; 52.55389°N 2.79813°W		17th century	The public house was altered in the 18th century. It is timber framed with rendered infill, roughcast, and has a tile roof. Its plan consists of two parallel ranges, one long, one short, and extensions. There are two storeys, the south front has two bays, a porch, and sash windows. The east front has two gables facing the road, with oriel windows in the ground floor; elsewhere the windows are casements.	II
Darrell Cottage and Owls Cottage; 52.52057°N 2.82183°W		Late 17th century	Three houses, later two, in brick with stone gable ends, dentil course eaves, and tile roofs. They have two storeys and a symmetrical front, with two projecting bays in the middle under a gable, and with shop fronts in the ground floor. This is flanked by two-bay wings with central doorways and casement windows.	II
Dudgeley Mill; 52.55898°N 2.78826°W	—	c. 1700	A former corn mill and mill house, later a private house, partly rendered at the rear, it is in brick with a band, and has tiled roofs with corbelled eaves, partly hipped. The mill has two storeys, the house has one storey and attics and dentil course eaves. There are various openings, the windows are casements, and in the house are gabled dormers.	II
17 High Street; 52.53853°N 2.80774°W		Early 18th century	At times a house and a hotel, it is in red brick on a plinth, with stone dressings, rusticated quoins, string courses, moulded corniced eaves, and a hipped tile roof with the gable facing the street. There are two storeys and an attic, and a street front of two bays. The windows are sashes, with moulded sills in the upper floor and plain sills below, and in the roof is a pedimented dormer. In the right return is a doorway with pilasters, a radial fanlight, and an entablature with carved medallions.	II*
Memorial 11 metres southeast of chancel 52.53808°N 2.80842°W	—	Early 18th century	The memorial is in the churchyard of St Laurence's Church. It is in sandstone, and consists of an ashlar headstone with a curved moulded top, set vertically, and inscribed on both sides.	II
Brook Cottage; 52.53921°N 2.80795°W	—	1733	A roughcast stone house, partly rendered, with dentil course eaves and a tile roof. There are two storeys and three bays. In the ground floor is a porch and three canted bay windows, and the upper floor has casement windows, the central window with a dated keystone.	II
59 High Street; 52.53722°N 2.80833°W	—	18th century	A brick house with corbelled eaves and a tile roof with a roof light. There are two bays, the left bay with one storey and an attic, and the right bay with two storeys. In the left bay is a bow window, and in the right bay is a bay window and a doorway in the ground floor, and a casement window with a segmental head above.	II
61 High Street; 52.53715°N 2.80838°W	—	18th century	A brick house with dentilled eaves and a tile roof. It has two storeys and three bays. The windows are casements with stone lintels and raised keyblocks, and above the door is a three-light fanlight.	II
63 High Street; 52.53707°N 2.80843°W	—	18th century	A house, later a shop, in brick with dentilled eaves and a tile roof. It has two storeys and two bays. The central doorway has a moulded surround with pilasters and a bracketed hood. To the left is an inserted shop window, to the right is a 20th-century casement window, and in the upper floor are two sash windows.	II
65 High Street; 52.53701°N 2.80848°W	—	18th century	Originally an inn, later a house, it is in brick with dentilled eaves and a tile roof with roof lights. It is on a corner site with an L-shaped plan, and has two storeys and an attic, three bays on the front and three bays on the right return. On the front is a doorway with a moulded surround with pilasters and a hood on consoles, and in the return is a door with a fanlight. The windows are casements that have stone lintels with chamfered lower edges.	II
2 The Square; 52.53869°N 2.80802°W	—	18th century	The house was altered later, it is roughcast, and has a tile roof. There are two storeys and an attic, with the gable end facing the street. In the ground floor on the right is a doorway with a moulded surround and a radial fanlight, to the left is a multi-paned canted bay window and to the left of that is a round-arched doorway. In the upper floor and attic are sash windows.	II
New House Farmhouse; 52.54436°N 2.78791°W	—	18th century	The farmhouse was altered in the 19th century. It is in brick and stone, partly rendered, and has a hipped tiled roof. There is a rectangular double-pile plan, two storeys, and a front of three bays. At the front is a central doorway with a rectangular fanlight, and the windows are casements with segmental heads. At the rear the casement windows are in Gothick style, with pointed heads in the upper floor and segmental heads in the ground floor, and the doorway has pilasters, and a fanlight with an ogee head.	II
Barn, New House Farm; 52.54440°N 2.78844°W	—	18th century	The barn has timber framed and weatherboarded side walls on a brick base, the gable ends are in brick, all on a stone plinth, and the roof is tiled. The openings include single and double doors, loft doors and ventilation slits.	II
Barn, Old Hall Farm; 52.52082°N 2.82378°W	—	18th century	A stone barn with a tiled roof, it has five bays, and is slightly curved. On the side facing the road are ventilation slits, and on the farmyard side are doors, windows and a loft opening.	II
Barn southeast of The Manor House; 52.55535°N 2.79743°W	—	18th century	The barn is timber framed and weatherboarded with an extension in brick, a stone gable end, and a tile roof. There is one storey and a loft, and five bays. It contains doors, and in the gable end are two tiers of ventilation slits and a loft door.	II
Minton House; 52.51053°N 2.84315°W	—	1753	A sandstone house with a tile roof, two storeys with an attic, three bays, and a recessed bay at the right. There is a central gabled porch, sash windows with keyblocks, and three eaves dormers.	II
3 The Square; 52.53863°N 2.80814°W	—	Late 18th century	A house and office, it is roughcast and has a tile roof. There are two storeys and an attic, and a front of three bays. In the ground floor is a shop front on the left with pilasters, a bracketed fascia and a cornice. To its right is a doorway with pilasters, an entablature, and a radial fanlight. To the right of this, and in the upper floor are sash windows. In the left gable end is another doorway, a round-headed stair window, and a casement window in the attic.	II
Brook Farmhouse and stables 52.52182°N 2.82380°W	—	Late 18th century	The farmhouse is in stone with brick dentil course eaves and a tile roof. There are two storeys and an attic, with three bays, a small cross-wing at one end and an extension at the rear. The windows are casements, in the ground floor with stone lintels, and keyblocks. The stables form another cross-wing, and are weatherboarded.	II
Cloverley; 52.55311°N 2.79739°W	—	Late 18th century	A pair of houses, later combined into one, in brick and stone, partly rendered, with tile roofs. Each house has two storeys and two bays, and the left house is lower. The windows are casements.	II
Insurance House; 52.53744°N 2.80815°W	—	Late 18th century	A house, later an office, it is roughcast on a stone plinth with moulded capping, and has a tile roof. There are two storeys and an attic, and three bays, with the gable end facing the street. In the centre is a doorway with pilasters, a radial fanlight, and a cornice hood on consoles. Most of the windows are sashes with segmental heads.	II
Milestone, High Street; 52.53755°N 2.80819°W		Late 18th century	The milestone is attached to a boundary wall. It is in ashlar stone, and consists of a tall slab with a rounded top. On the milestone is a square metal plaque inscribed with the distance to "SALOP" (Shrewsbury) in Roman numerals.	II
Milestone near The Malt House; 52.52003°N 2.82179°W		Late 18th century	The milestone is in ashlar stone, it is rectangular, and has a rounded top. The stone is inscribed with the distance to Ludlow in miles as Roman numerals.	II
Ragleth House, Church Stretton; 52.53664°N 2.80881°W		Late 18th century	A brick house on a stone plinth, the top storey roughcast, with a parapet and tile roofs. There are three storeys, two parallel ranges, a single storey rear wing, and a front of three bays. The central doorway has pilasters, a radial fanlight and an open pediment. This is flanked by bay windows, and above are sash windows, those in the middle floor with wedge lintels. Elsewhere the windows are casements, those at the rear with Gothick-style pointed arches.	II
Churchyard wall, gates and stile, St Laurence's Church; 52.53844°N 2.80904°W		1792	The walls are in stone with ashlar copings, and extend for about 50 metres (160 ft) along the north side of the churchyard and for about 60 metres (200 ft) along the west side. In the west side is a pair of cast iron gates and a gate post with finials. In the northwest corner is another gate and a stile with a cast iron screen and sandstone steps, and three oak posts.	II
Ragleth House, Little Stretton; 52.52080°N 2.82196°W	—	c. 1800	The house was extended in the 20th century. It is in red brick on a stone plinth, with a band and a tile roof. There are two storeys, and the original part has three bays. The central doorway has fluted pilasters, a radial fanlight and a fluted boxed entablature with scrolled brackets. The windows are mullioned and transomed and contain casements. To the right is the one-bay 20th-century extension that contains a two-storey bay window.	II
Manor Farmhouse; 52.51101°N 2.83965°W	—	Late 18th to early 19th century	A stone farmhouse with a tile roof, two storeys, a three-bay front, and a rear wing. There is a central gabled projecting porch with an arched opening. The windows in the front range are sashes, and in the rear wing they are casements.	II
41 Church Street; 52.53803°N 2.80925°W		Early 19th century	A rendered house with a tile roof, two storeys and two bays. Above the central door is a bracketed hood, and the windows are mullioned, in the ground floor they also have transoms.	II
43 and 45 Church Street; 52.53810°N 2.80924°W		Early 19th century	A house, later divided into two, it is roughcast, and has a roof partly slated and partly tiled. There are two storeys, and each house has two bays. The windows are sashes.	II
57 High Street; 52.53729°N 2.80825°W	—	Early 19th century	A roughcast shop with a tile roof and two storeys. In the ground floor is a double-fronted shop window containing a central splayed doorway, and another doorway to the right, and in the upper floor are two sash windows.	II
Ashford House; 52.53680°N 2.80894°W	—	Early 19th century	A brick house with dentil course eaves and a tile roof. There are two storeys, three bays, and a two-storey rear extension. On the front is a portico with Tuscan columns, and the doorway has a moulded surround and a radial fanlight. The windows are sashes with segmental heads. The right gable end is rendered, and there are scalloped bargeboards.	II
Linden Lea; 52.52030°N 2.82230°W	—	Early 19th century	Three houses, later combined into one, it is in brick with some stone in the gable end, and a slate roof. There are two storeys and six bays. The windows are casements, and along the ground floor is a lean-to glazed extension.	II
Memorial 2 metres east of south transept 52.53806°N 2.80865°W	—	Early 19th century	The memorial is in the churchyard of St Laurence's Church and is to the memory of members of the Jones family. It is in sandstone, and consists of a chest tomb on a plain plinth. The tomb has a coped lid with moulded edges, side panels, and corner piers with a cusped lancet motif.	II
Memorial 4 metres south of south transept 52.53805°N 2.80867°W	—	Early 19th century	The memorial is in the churchyard of St Laurence's Church and is to the memory of members of the Childe family. It is in sandstone, and consists of a chest tomb on a plain plinth. The tomb has a pyramidal lid, side and end panels, and corner piers with incised panels.	II
Memorial 10 metres southeast of chancel 52.53810°N 2.80846°W	—	Early 19th century	The memorial is in the churchyard of St Laurence's Church and is to the memory of members of the Robinson family. It is in sandstone, and consists of a pedestal tomb on a plain double-tier plinth. The tomb has a pyramidal cap with a moulded cornice, and panels with an incised border and inset corners.	II
Memorial 13 metres south of south transept 52.53799°N 2.80875°W	—	Early 19th century	The memorial is in the churchyard of St Laurence's Church and is to the memory of members of the Cook family. It is in sandstone, and consists of a rectangular headstone with a rounded top, a floral motif, and two inscribed panels, and at their foot is a poem.	II
Memorial 13 metres south of west end of nave 52.53800°N 2.80901°W	—	Early 19th century	The memorial is in the churchyard of St Laurence's Church. It is in sandstone, and consists of a pedestal tomb. This has a tented pyramidal lid with a raised flat cap, a stepped and moulded cornice, and inset panels with quadrant corners. The inscription is illegible.	II
Memorial 14 metres south of west end of nave 52.53797°N 2.80901°W	—	Early 19th century	The memorial is in the churchyard of St Laurence's Church and is to the memory of members of the Home family. It is in sandstone, and consists of a pedestal tomb on a moulded chamfered plinth. There is a tented pyramid lid with a stepped and moulded cornice, raised and fielded panels with inscriptions in an incised bordered shield motif.	II
Memorial 15 metres south of chancel 52.53809°N 2.80859°W	—	Early 19th century	The memorial is in the churchyard of St Laurence's Church and is to the memory of members of the Robinson family. It is in sandstone, and consists of a pedestal tomb on a plain plinth. There is a pyramidal cap with pedimented cross-gabled sides, and a tapered solid shaft on a moulded base.	II
Memorial 17 metres south of south transept 52.53792°N 2.80877°W	—	Early 19th century	The memorial is in the churchyard of St Laurence's Church and is to the memory of members of the Corfield family. It is in sandstone, and consists of a chest tomb on a plain plinth. There is a plain pedimented lid with a plain inset, plain side and end panels, and raised fluted corner piers.	II
Memorial 26 metres south of chancel 52.53788°N 2.80848°W	—	Early 19th century	The memorial is in the churchyard of St Laurence's Church and is to the memory of members of the Robinson family. It is in sandstone, and consists of a chest tomb on a plain chamfered plinth. There is a coped lid with moulded edges, plain inscribed side and end panels, and corner piers with enriched chamfered edges and a carved cusped lancet motif.	II
Milepost; 52.53519°N 2.78617°W		Early 19th century	The milepost is in cast iron. It consists of a two-sided angled stem widening at head and connected to triangular top panel. The distances to Church Stretton and to Much Wenlock are cast on the sides.	II
Somershey and railings 52.53672°N 2.80863°W	—	Early 19th century	A brick house with a band and a slate roof. It has two storeys and an attic, two ranges parallel with street, a lower two-storey rear extension, and a front of two bays. The round-headed doorway has a moulded architrave and a radial fanlight. To its left is a canted bay window, and in the upper floor are two sash windows. Elsewhere there are casement windows, a lunette, a stair window, and at the rear is another bay window. enclosing the front garden are cast iron railings and a gate.	II
The Ragleth Inn; 52.52233°N 2.82197°W		Early 19th century	The public house is in red brick with dentil course eaves and a tile roof. There are two storeys and three bays. In the centre is projecting tiled gabled porch, flanked by gabled bay windows. In the upper floor are mullioned and transomed casement windows with segmental-arched heads.	II
The Wayside Inn; 52.50357°N 2.82379°W		Early 19th century	The public house is in roughcast brick with a tile roof. It has two storeys, four bays, and a rear outshut. The central doorway has pilasters and a fanlight, and the windows are sashes in moulded architraves. (Note: Street View in July 2016 shows that the pub has been renamed as The Station Inn.)	II
West Cottage, The Old Rectory House and Old Rectory Cottage; 52.53966°N 2.81006°W	—	Early 19th century	Originally a rectory, later divided into three dwellings, it is in rendered brick, and has slate roofs, gabled at the front and hipped at the rear. There are two storeys, and a south front with a central range of three bays, flanked by two-bay projecting bays with pedimented gables. The west and entrance front has four bays, and a Doric portico with pilastered sides and an entablature, and a door with a fanlight. Most of the windows are sashes.	II
The Priory; 52.53794°N 2.80929°W		1832	A red brick house in Gothick style with rusticated quoins and tile roofs. There are two storeys, and facing the road are three gabled bays with moulded parapet gables. The outer bays contain mullioned and transomed casement windows with stepped hood moulds, and in the middle bay is a porch with a four-centred arch and a gable with a datestone.	II
Memorial 24 metres south of chancel 52.53792°N 2.80850°W	—	Mid 19th century	The memorial is in the churchyard of St Laurence's Church and is to the memory of Henry Gough. It is in sandstone, and consists of a chest tomb on a plain plinth. There is a stepped cambered lid with plain edges, plain inclined panels with incised borders, and fluted corner piers.	II
Burway House and railings 52.53927°N 2.80875°W		c. 1860	Originally a school, later used for residential purposes, it is in brick with a stone rear wing, and has a slate roof, hipped to the east. There are two ranges parallel to the road, three storeys, a front of three bays, and a rear wing with brick dentil course eaves. The porch has a pedimented gable on consoles, above the door is a fanlight, and to the right is a canted bay window. The other windows are casements with keyblocks. In front of the house are cast iron railings and gates.	II
Marsh Brook Signal Box; 52.50381°N 2.82354°W		1872	The signal box was built for the Shrewsbury and Hereford Railway. It is in brick with stone dressings, a string course, and a Welsh slate roof, and a rectangular plan. In the upper part are mullioned windows containing casements and horizontally-sliding sashes. A flight of wooden steps leads up to the operating room, and inside is a lever frame of 18 levers.	II
10 and 12 Cunnery Road; 52.53691°N 2.81011°W	—	1899–1900	A pair of semi-detached houses by Barry Parker and Raymond Unwin. They are in rendered brick with a hipped tile roof. There is one storey and attics, and a large central gables containing casement windows, and there are casement windows below. In the outer bays, are decorative openwork gabled porches.	II
All Saints Church; 52.52197°N 2.82149°W		1903	The church was prefabricated, and is timber framed with rendered panels on a red brick plinth, and has a thatched roof. It consists of a nave and a chancel in one cell, a gabled south porch, and north and south vestries. At the west end is a timber bellcote with a shingle spire.	II
Scotsman's Field and balustrading 52.54124°N 2.81276°W	—	1908	The house, designed by Ernest Newton, has been divided into flats. It is roughcast, and has a tile roof and gables with ornamental bargeboards. There are two storeys, and the house has an elongated H-shaped plan. There are projecting gables with hipped roofs, and a central projecting gabled bay. The windows are casements, with polygonal bay windows on the garden front. To the south is a terraced garden with brick balustrading.	II
All Stretton War Memorial; 52.55599°N 2.79673°W		1920	The war memorial stands at the side of the B5477 road. It is in limestone, and consists of an obelisk on a pedestal on a stepped plinth. The plinth has a moulded cap with small pediments on each face. On the plinth are plaques in green slate with inscriptions and the names of those lost in the two World Wars.	II
Church Stretton War Memorial; 52.54035°N 2.80927°W		1920	The war memorial is in limestone and consists of a Celtic wheel-head cross with a tapering shaft on a rectangular base with a sloping top. The cross and upper part of the shaft have carved interlace decoration, and in the lower part of the shaft is a sword in relief. There is an inscription on the base, and marble plaques with more inscriptions and the names of those lost in the two World Wars.	II

== Notes and references ==
=== Sources ===
- Historic England, "Sundial 2 metres south of south transept of Church of St Lawrence, Church Stretton (1383280)", National Heritage List for England
- Historic England, "Church of St Lawrence, Church Stretton (1383267)", National Heritage List for England
- Historic England, "Long Mynd House, Church Stretton (1383255)", National Heritage List for England
- Historic England, "The Manor House, Church Stretton (1383251)", National Heritage List for England
- Historic England, "Bircher Cottage, Church Stretton (1383237)", National Heritage List for England
- Historic England, "Old Hall Farmhouse, Church Stretton (1383246)", National Heritage List for England
- Historic England, "The Malt House, Church Stretton (1383249)", National Heritage List for England
- Historic England, "The Tan House, Church Stretton (1383253)", National Heritage List for England
- Historic England, "Old Hall Farmhouse, Church Stretton (1383230)", National Heritage List for England
- Historic England, "Tudor Cottage, Church Stretton (1383300)", National Heritage List for England
- Historic England, "Brook Cottages, Church Stretton (1383236)", National Heritage List for England
- Historic England, "The Bucks Head Public House, Church Stretton (1383299)", National Heritage List for England
- Historic England, "The Manor House, Church Stretton (1383231)", National Heritage List for England
- Historic England, "Well Cottage, Church Stretton (1383258)", National Heritage List for England
- Historic England, "The Ancient House 1, Church Stretton (1383234)", National Heritage List for England
- Historic England, "1603, Church Stretton (1383221)", National Heritage List for England
- Historic England, "No. 24 High Street, Church Stretton (1383284)", National Heritage List for England
- Historic England, "Greengates, Church Stretton (1382527)", National Heritage List for England
- Historic England, "Nos. 13 and 15 High Street, Church Stretton (1383282)", National Heritage List for England
- Historic England, "Nos. 49 and 49A High Street, Church Stretton (1383287)", National Heritage List for England
- Historic England, "Nos. 54 and 56 High Street, Church Stretton (1383290)", National Heritage List for England
- Historic England, "Barn and cowsheds approximately 5 metres west of churchyard of All Saints, Church Stretton (1383241)", National Heritage List for England
- Historic England, "Botvyle Farmhouse, Church Stretton (1383222)", National Heritage List for England
- Historic England, "Farmbuildings immediately north of Botvyle Farmhouse, Church Stretton (1383223)", National Heritage List for England
- Historic England, "Barn, cowshed and store to south of Brook Farmhouse, Church Stretton (1383239)", National Heritage List for England
- Historic England, "Courtyard Cottage, Church Stretton (1383242)", National Heritage List for England
- Historic England, "Ivanhoe, Church Stretton (1383254)", National Heritage List for England
- Historic England, "Kings Arms Public House, Church Stretton (1383289)", National Heritage List for England
- Historic England, "Lower Botvyle, Church Stretton (1383226)", National Heritage List for England
- Historic England, "Manor Cottage, Church Stretton (1383245)", National Heritage List for England
- Historic England, "Old Barn, Church Stretton (1383285)", National Heritage List for England
- Historic England, "Spring Cottage, Church Stretton (1383260)", National Heritage List for England
- Historic England, "The Ancient House 2, Church Stretton (1383235)", National Heritage List for England
- Historic England, "Yew Tree Inn Public House, Church Stretton (1383233)", National Heritage List for England
- Historic England, "Darrell Cottage and Owls Cottage, Church Stretton (1383243)", National Heritage List for England
- Historic England, "Dudgeley Mill, Church Stretton (1383225)", National Heritage List for England
- Historic England, "No. 11 High Street, Church Stretton (1383283)", National Heritage List for England
- Historic England, "Memorial 11 metres southeast of chancel of Church of St Lawrence, Church Stretton (1383272)", National Heritage List for England
- Historic England, "Brook Cottage, Church Stretton (1383259)", National Heritage List for England
- Historic England, "No. 59 High Street, Church Stretton (1383292)", National Heritage List for England
- Historic England, "No. 61 High Street, Church Stretton (1383293)", National Heritage List for England
- Historic England, "No. 63 High Street, Church Stretton (1383294)", National Heritage List for England
- Historic England, "No. 65 High Street, Church Stretton (1383295)", National Heritage List for England
- Historic England, "No. 2 The Square, Church Stretton (1383302)", National Heritage List for England
- Historic England, "New House Farmhouse, Church Stretton (1383228)", National Heritage List for England
- Historic England, "Barn to west of New House Farmhouse, Church Stretton (1383229)", National Heritage List for England
- Historic England, "Barn to north of Old House Farmhouse, Church Stretton (1383247)", National Heritage List for England
- Historic England, "Barn approximately 20 metres south-east of The Manor House, Church Stretton (1383232)", National Heritage List for England
- Historic England, "Minton House, Church Stretton (1383257)", National Heritage List for England
- Historic England, "No. 3 The Square, Church Stretton (1383303)", National Heritage List for England
- Historic England, "Brook Farmhouse including attached stables, Church Stretton (1383238)", National Heritage List for England
- Historic England, "Cloverley, Church Stretton (1383224)", National Heritage List for England
- Historic England, "Insurance House, Church Stretton (1383288)", National Heritage List for England
- Historic England, "Milestone in front of No. 47 High Street, Church Stretton (1383286)", National Heritage List for England
- Historic England, "Milestone 27 metres south-west of The Malt House, Church Stretton (1383250)", National Heritage List for England
- Historic England, "Ragleth House, Church Stretton (1383297)", National Heritage List for England
- Historic England, "Churchyard wall, stiles and gates to north and west of Church of St Lawrence, Church Stretton (1383268)", National Heritage List for England
- Historic England, "Ragleth House, Church Stretton (1383248)", National Heritage List for England
- Historic England, "Manor Farmhouse, Church Stretton (1383256)", National Heritage List for England
- Historic England, "No. 41 Church Street, Church Stretton (1383265)", National Heritage List for England
- Historic England, "Nos. 43 and 45 Church Street, Church Stretton (1383266)", National Heritage List for England
- Historic England, "No. 57 High Street, Church Stretton (1383291)", National Heritage List for England
- Historic England, "Ashford House, Church Stretton (1383298)", National Heritage List for England
- Historic England, "Linden Lea, Church Stretton (1383244)", National Heritage List for England
- Historic England, "Memorial 2 metres east of south transept of Church of St Lawrence, Church Stretton (1383269)", National Heritage List for England
- Historic England, "Memorial 4 metres south of south transept of Church of St Lawrence, Church Stretton (1383270)", National Heritage List for England
- Historic England, "Memorial 10 metres southeast of chancel of Church of St Lawrence, Church Stretton (1383271)", National Heritage List for England
- Historic England, "Memorial 13 metres south of south transept of Church of St Lawrence, Church Stretton (1383273)", National Heritage List for England
- Historic England, "Memorial 13 metres south of west end of nave of Church of St Lawrence, Church Stretton (1383274)", National Heritage List for England
- Historic England, "Memorial 14 metres south of west end of nave of Church of St Lawrence, Church Stretton (1383275)", National Heritage List for England
- Historic England, "Memorial 15 metres south of chancel of Church of St Lawrence, Church Stretton (1383276)", National Heritage List for England
- Historic England, "Memorial 17 metres south of south transept of Church of St Lawrence, Church Stretton (1383277)", National Heritage List for England
- Historic England, "Memorial 26 metres south of chancel of Church of St Lawrence, Church Stretton (1383279)", National Heritage List for England
- Historic England, "Milepost at NGR SO 4678 9333, Church Stretton (1383301)", National Heritage List for England
- Historic England, "Somershey including railings, Church Stretton (1383296)", National Heritage List for England
- Historic England, "The Ragleth Inn, Church Stretton (1383252)", National Heritage List for England
- Historic England, "The Wayside Inn, Church Stretton (1269792)", National Heritage List for England
- Historic England, "West Cottage, The Old Rectory House and Old Rectory Cottage, Church Stretton (1383263)", National Heritage List for England
- Historic England, "The Priory, Church Stretton (1383264)", National Heritage List for England
- Historic England, "Memorial 24 metres south of chancel of Church of St Lawrence, Church Stretton (1383278)", National Heritage List for England
- Historic England, "Burway House including railings, Church Stretton (1383261)", National Heritage List for England
- Historic England, "Marsh Brook Signal Box, Church Stretton (1412942)", National Heritage List for England
- Historic England, "Nos. 10 and 12 Cunnery Road, Church Stretton (1383281)", National Heritage List for England
- Historic England, "Church of All Saints, Church Stretton (1383240)", National Heritage List for England
- Historic England, "Scotsman's Field including garden balustrading, Church Stretton (1383262)", National Heritage List for England
- Historic England, "All Stretton War Memorial, Church Stretton (1427795)", National Heritage List for England
- Historic England, "Church Stretton War Memorial, Church Stretton (1428235)", National Heritage List for England
- Historic England, Listed Buildings
- Newman, John; Pevsner, Nikolaus (2006), Shropshire, The Buildings of England, New Haven and London: Yale University Press, ISBN 0-300-12083-4
