= St Laurence's Church, Church Stretton =

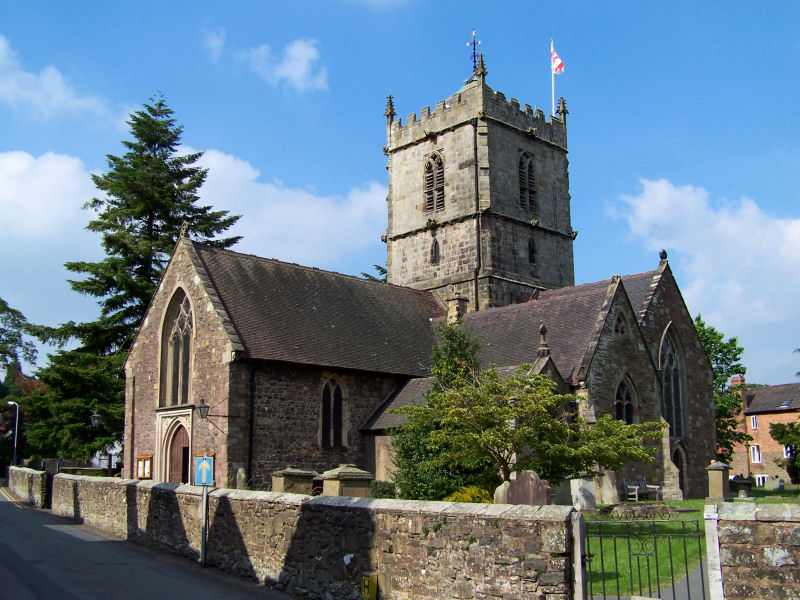
- St Laurence's Church from the southwest

- Location in Shropshire
- 52.5382°N 2.8088°W
- OS grid reference: SO 452,936
- Location: Church Street, Church Stretton, Shropshire
- Country: England
- Denomination: Anglican
- Churchmanship: Evangelical
- Website: St Laurence, Church Stretton

History
- Status: Parish church

Architecture
- Functional status: Active
- Heritage designation: Grade I
- Designated: 4 July 1952
- Architect(s): S. Pountney Smith (aisles and restoration)
- Architectural type: Church
- Style: Norman, Gothic

Specifications
- Materials: Stone, tiled roofs

Administration
- Province: Canterbury
- Diocese: Hereford
- Archdeaconry: Ludlow
- Deanery: Condover
- Parish: Church Stretton

Clergy
- Rector: Revd Steve Johnson
- Pastor(s): Gillian Taylor, Chris Lear

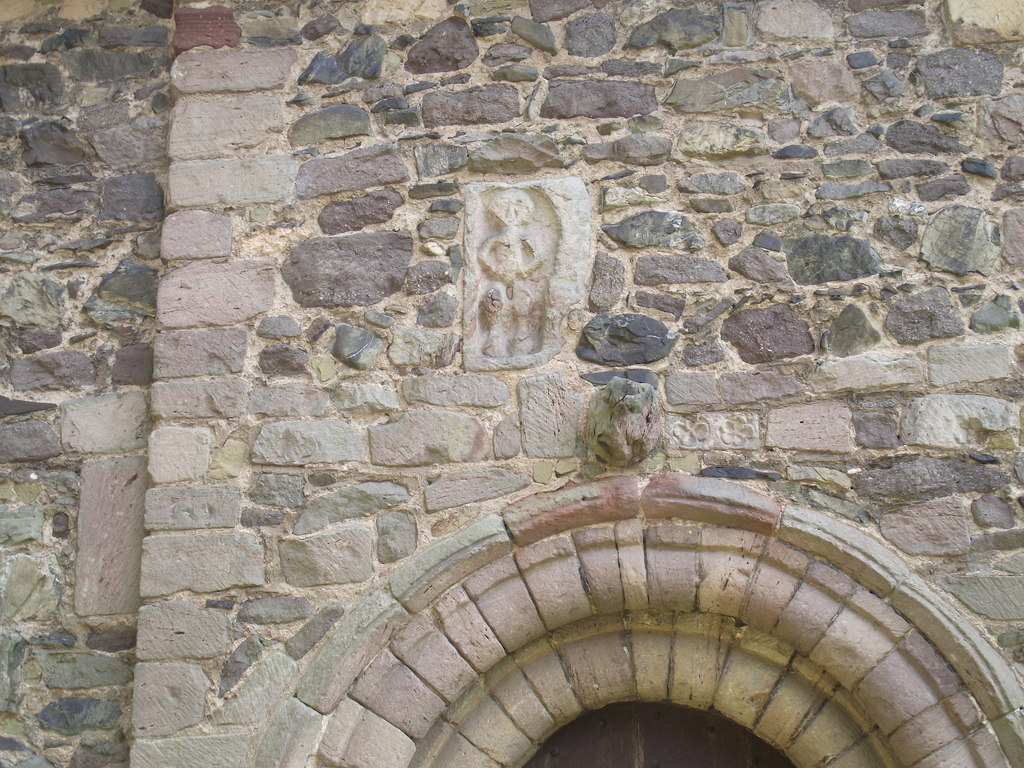
Sheila-na-gig above the north doorway

St Laurence's Church is in Church Street, Church Stretton, Shropshire, England. It is an active Anglican parish church in the deanery of Condover, the archdeaconry of Ludlow, and the diocese of Hereford. Its benefice is united with those of St Michael and All Angels, All Stretton, and All Saints, Little Stretton to form the parish of Church Stretton. The church is recorded in the National Heritage List for England as a designated Grade I listed building.

== History ==
The nave of the church dates from the 12th century, and the transepts from the following century. The chancel and the upper stage of the tower are from the 15th century. The south vestry was added in 1831, and west aisles were added to the transepts during a restoration by S. Pountney Smith in 1867–68. There were further restorations in 1882 and in 1932. In 2010 the interior of the church was modernised by replacing the pews with movable chairs, and by installing new heating, lighting and sound systems.

== Architecture ==
=== Exterior ===
Constructed in stone with tiled roofs, the church has a cruciform plan, consisting of a nave and chancel, north and south transepts, each with a west aisle, and a tower at the crossing. The nave is Norman in style, and the rest of the church is Early English, other than the top stage of the tower, which is Perpendicular. The tower is in three stages, with corner and central gargoyles. There are lancet windows in the lower and middle stages, and a clock face on the east side of the middle stage. The top stage contains two-light, flat-headed, louvred bell openings, and at the summit is a battlemented parapet with elaborate corner finials. The tower has diagonal buttresses, that at the southeast angle being carved with the figure of St Laurence. The nave has Norman buttresses, and two Norman doorways, one on the north and the other on the south. Above the north doorway is a re-set sheila-na-gig. The other doorways are Early English. The west window and windows in the transepts contain Decorated-style tracery, the tracery in the east window being Perpendicular.

=== Interior ===
Inside the church, all the roofs are medieval. In the southwest corner of the chancel is a window with a piscina in its sill. The reredos was constructed in about 1820, re-using 17th-century panelling. The font is octagonal and Perpendicular in style. The pulpit dates from 1880, is made of stone and different marbles, and was designed by Samuel Pountney Smith. In the ceiling of the tower is a sculpture dating from about 1970 depicting St Laurence and his attribute, a gridiron. Some of the windows on the north and south sides of the chancel contain medieval glass, and others have Flemish roundels. The glass in the east window is by Betton and Evans of Shrewsbury, and in the nave is an early window by Burlison and Grylls. In the west side of the south transept is a memorial window to Lord Leighton of Stretton, former President of the Royal Academy, commemorating the fact he took his title from the town. Another memorial window, with plaque, commemorates writer Hesba Stretton, depicting the central character of her novel, Jessica's First Prayer. The church contains within the north transept framed rolls of honour to the respective parish dead of both World Wars and a plaque to 2nd Lieutenant Guy Barnett, killed at Battle of Neuve Chapelle in World War I. The two-manual pipe organ was made in 1883 by Nicholson of Worcester, and restored by the same company in 1987. There is a ring of eight bells. Four of these were cast in 1711 by Abraham Rudhall I of Gloucester, and the other four in 1890 by John Taylor and Company of Loughborough.

== External features ==
In the churchyard are 13 listed structures, each of which is designated at Grade II. To the north and west of the church are walls, stiles and gates. To the south of the south transept is a sundial. This originated as a medieval churchyard cross, whose shaft is sunk into a former mill wheel. On the top are two brass dials, one overlying the other. The gnomon is missing. The other items are all memorials, which stand to the east and the south of the church.

== See also ==
- Grade I listed churches in Shropshire
- Listed buildings in Church Stretton
