= Strefford =

Hamlet in Shropshire, England

Coordinates: 52.465°N 2.819°W

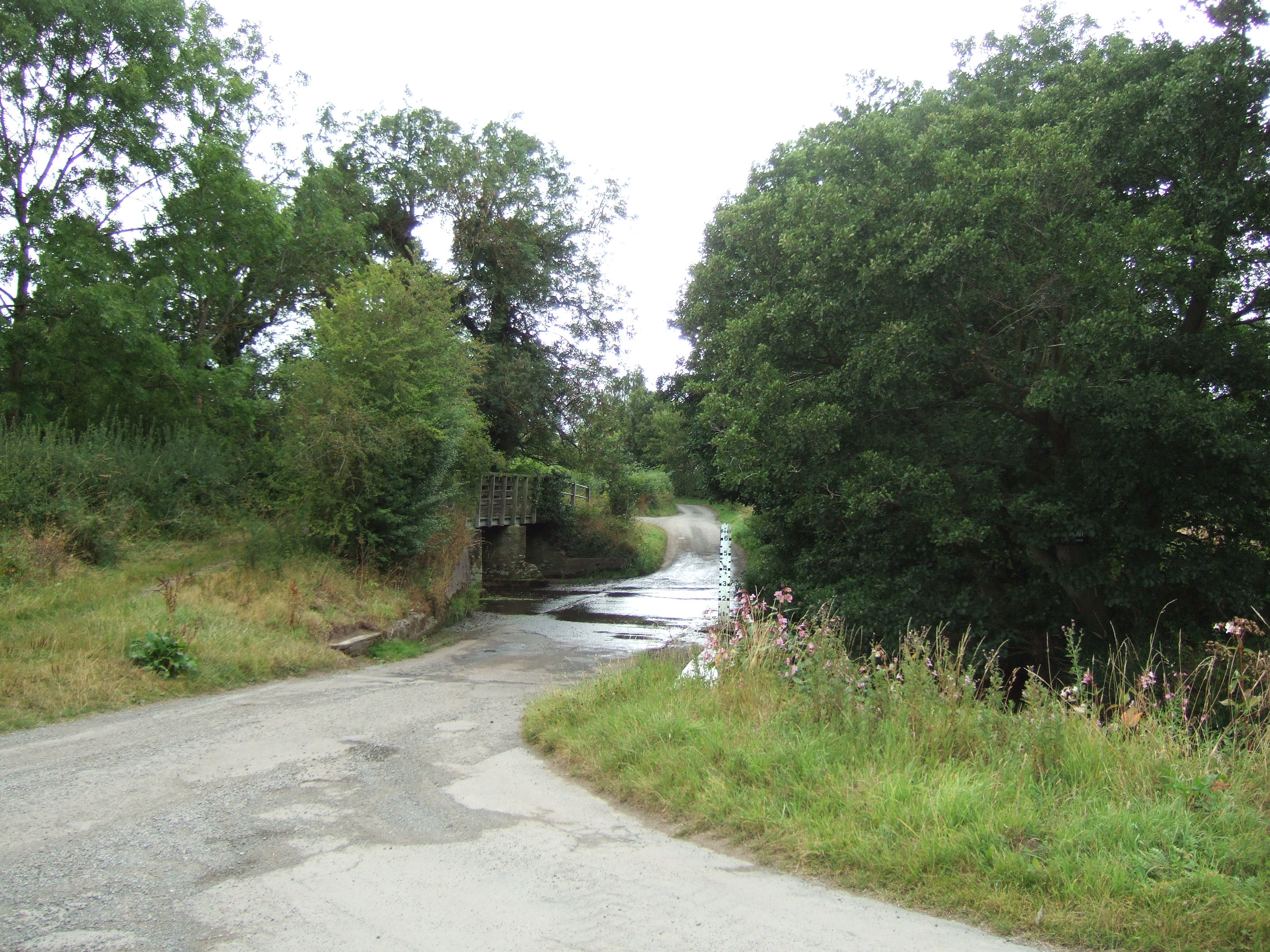
- The ford at Strefford, as seen in the summer; there is a footbridge to the side

- Location within Shropshire
- OS grid reference: SO443855
- Civil parish: Wistanstow
- Unitary authority: Shropshire
- Ceremonial county: Shropshire
- Region: West Midlands
- Country: England
- Sovereign state: United Kingdom
- Post town: CRAVEN ARMS
- Postcode district: SY7
- Dialling code: 01588
- Police: West Mercia
- Fire: Shropshire
- Ambulance: West Midlands
- UK Parliament: Ludlow

Strefford is a historic hamlet in Shropshire, England.

It lies in the civil parish of Wistanstow and is situated just off the A49 road, 2 miles (3.2 km) north of the small town of Craven Arms. The nearest settlement is Upper Affcot, a hamlet located north of the A49, with a public house. Strefford is situated at an elevation between 130 metres (430 ft) and 135m, and just to the east is Strefford Wood, which is at the southern end of Wenlock Edge; the bridleway that runs along the Edge ends just outside the hamlet.

Strefford was recorded in the Domesday Book as 'Straford' and in 1255 as 'Streford'. The name derives from its location between the Roman road (a "Street") at Wistanstow (to the west) and the ford immediately to the east of the hamlet, which crosses the Byne or Quinny Brook. The Byne and Quinny Brooks meet just before the ford, and about a mile downstream, they flow into the River Onny.

There is a farm shop and a bed and breakfast at Strefford Hall.

Strefford Conservation Area covers all the settlements, including the ford. There are five Listed buildings within the hamlet: Ford Cottage, Malt Cottage, The Cottage, the (disused) parish pumphouse, and Strefford Cottages. Additionally, there is a listed milestone on the A49 road at Strefford. The village lies within the Shropshire Hills Area of Outstanding Natural Beauty designation.

== See also ==
- Listed buildings in Wistanstow
