= Bushmoor =

Coordinates: 52.483°N 2.834°W

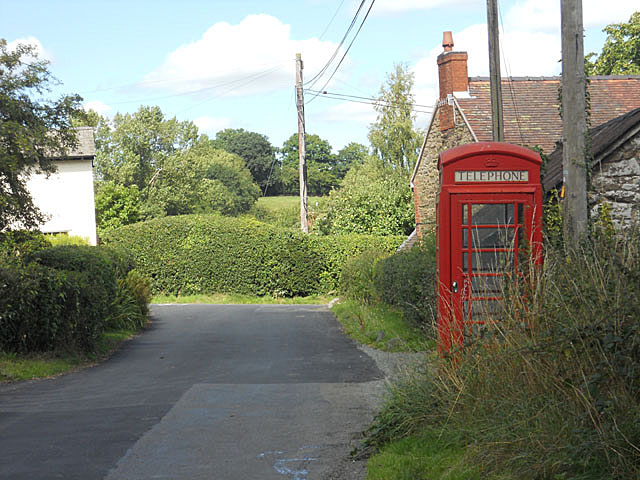
- The village telephone box at Bushmoor

- Location within Shropshire
- OS grid reference: SO433875
- Civil parish: Wistanstow
- Unitary authority: Shropshire
- Ceremonial county: Shropshire
- Region: West Midlands
- Country: England
- Sovereign state: United Kingdom
- Post town: CRAVEN ARMS
- Postcode district: SY7
- Dialling code: 01694
- Police: West Mercia
- Fire: Shropshire
- Ambulance: West Midlands
- UK Parliament: Ludlow

Bushmoor is a village in Shropshire, England.

It is located in the parish of Wistanstow, 1¼ miles north of that village, and half a mile west of the A49 road.

The lane running into the village from Wistanstow is a Roman road, which ran between the Roman settlements and forts at Leintwardine and Wroxeter. The present day lane turns a sharp corner (to the east and the A49) off this ancient route and this is known as The Corner.
