= Cheney Longville =

Village in Shropshire, England

Coordinates: 52.459°N 2.856°W

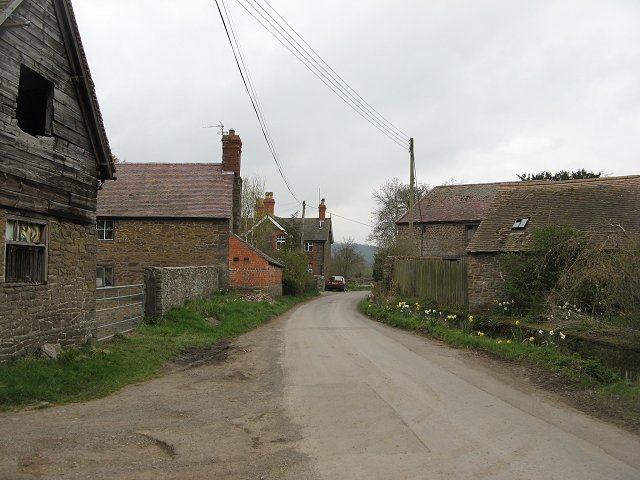
- Cheney Longville

- Location within Shropshire
- OS grid reference: SO418849
- Civil parish: Wistanstow
- Unitary authority: Shropshire
- Ceremonial county: Shropshire
- Region: West Midlands
- Country: England
- Sovereign state: United Kingdom
- Post town: CRAVEN ARMS
- Postcode district: SY7
- Dialling code: 01588
- Police: West Mercia
- Fire: Shropshire
- Ambulance: West Midlands
- UK Parliament: Ludlow

Cheney Longville (/ʃɛniː lɒŋvɪl/ SHEH-nee LONG-vil) is a small village in Shropshire, England.

It lies in the parish of Wistanstow, near the small market town of Craven Arms.

It was simply called "Langfeld" in 1087, when it was owned by Shrewsbury Abbey. Roger de Cheney gave his name to the village around 1395 when he fortified the manor house - Cheney Longville Castle.

The River Onny and the A489 are to the immediate north. About a mile to the south is Sibdon Carwood.

== See also ==
- Listed buildings in Wistanstow
