= Minton, Shropshire =

Hamlet in Shropshire, England

Coordinates: 52.511°N 2.840°W

Minton
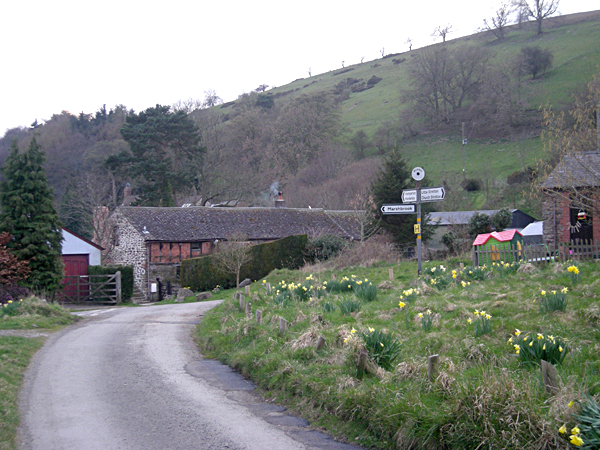
- Minton, Shropshire

- Location within Shropshire
- OS grid reference: SO429907
- Civil parish: Church Stretton
- Unitary authority: Shropshire
- Ceremonial county: Shropshire
- Region: West Midlands
- Country: England
- Sovereign state: United Kingdom
- Post town: CHURCH STRETTON
- Postcode district: SY6
- Dialling code: 01694
- Police: West Mercia
- Fire: Shropshire
- Ambulance: West Midlands
- UK Parliament: Ludlow

Minton is a hamlet in Shropshire, England.

It is located in the parish of Church Stretton, 2 1/2 miles (4.0 km) southwest of the market town of Church Stretton. A historic settlement, it is situated on a foothill of the Long Mynd at around 240 m (790 ft) above sea level. As of 2010, there are around 12 dwellings in the hamlet.

Three lanes lead out from the hamlet: one to the A49 road, one mile southeast at Marshbrook; another lane leads to the hamlet of Hamperley, which is also in Church Stretton parish; and Little Stretton is one mile to the northeast.

== History and features ==
The place name is from Welsh mynydd meaning 'hill' and Old English tun meaning 'settlement', 'town'. The hamlet has largely retained its Anglo-Saxon layout, with a patchwork of plots and haphazard narrow lanes. There are remains of a motte, which dates from either Anglo-Saxon or Norman times. It was a township and Royal manor, held by King Edward prior to the Norman conquest. It is mentioned in the Domesday Book.

Today the hamlet consists of farms and cottages and is agricultural in character. It is designated a conservation area and there are 5 Listed buildings in the hamlet – Long Mynd House, Ivanhoe, Manor Farmhouse, Well Cottage, and Minton House.

There is an outdoors activity centre located on the lane between Minton and Hamperley, the Longmynd Adventure Camp, with overnight accommodation and camping ground.

== Minton Hill and Batch ==
Minton Hill is to the northwest of the hamlet and rises to 453m. A bridleway leads up to its summit (and continues beyond onto the Long Mynd) from the hamlet of Minton. Another walking route up to the Long Mynd is via the Minton Batch, where a bridleway leads up from the lane to Hamperley.

== Famous residents ==
The Oscar-nominated actor, Pete Postlethwaite, lived at Yew Tree Cottage in Minton for many years before moving to the village of More near Bishop's Castle. "I do love Shropshire," he was quoted as saying. "Whenever I get home, my shoulders drop by two inches. The only reason I’ve been able to do the things I’ve done is because I have my family and Shropshire to come home to. They’ve made everything else possible."

== The Minton surname ==
The Shropshire surname of Minton originates from the name of the hamlet although resources seem to disagree as to its earliest occurrence. Some point to Jordan de Minton, who was mentioned in the Pipe Rolls of Northumberland in 1169. However, the Rev R W Eyton in his book, 'The Antiquities of Shropshire' identifies Walter de Miniton (later Walter de Muneton) as the first tenant of Minton or Muneton as the site was then known. Subsequent Mintons of note include Thomas Minton (English potter), John Minton (British artist), Yvonne Minton (Australian opera singer), Mary Minton (novelist) and Sherman Minton (US Democratic senator).

== See also ==
- Listed buildings in Church Stretton
