= Cwm Head =

Hamlet in Shropshire, England

Coordinates: 52.493°N 2.850°W

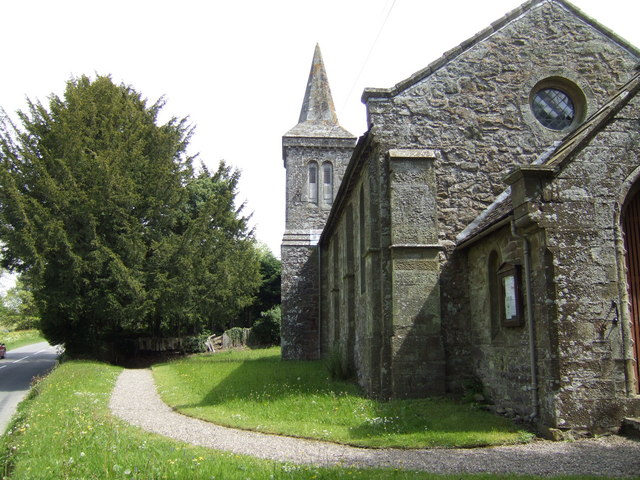
- St. Michael's and All Angels church, Cwm Head

- Location within Shropshire
- OS grid reference: SO422887
- Civil parish: Wistanstow
- Unitary authority: Shropshire
- Ceremonial county: Shropshire
- Region: West Midlands
- Country: England
- Sovereign state: United Kingdom
- Post town: CHURCH STRETTON
- Postcode district: SY6
- Dialling code: 01694
- Police: West Mercia
- Fire: Shropshire
- Ambulance: West Midlands
- UK Parliament: Ludlow

Cwm Head is a hamlet in Shropshire, England. The name is part-Welsh, part-English and means "Head of the Valley".

It is located in the civil parish of Wistanstow and on the B4370 road, 1 1/4 miles (2.0 km) southwest of Marshbrook and the A49 road. From Cwm Head, the B4370 heads downhill both towards Marshbrook and in the other direction towards Horderley and the A489.

There is a Church of England parish church at Cwm Head - "St Michael and All Angels". It was built in 1845 to a neo-Norman design by H. C. Whitling and is built largely of stone.

To the northwest is the hamlet of Hamperley while to the northeast (towards Marshbrook) is the hamlet of Whittingslow.

The hamlet lies between 226m and 232m above sea level.
