= Listed buildings in Sibdon Carwood =

Sibdon Carwood is a civil parish in Shropshire, England. It contains nine listed buildings that are recorded in the National Heritage List for England. Of these, two are listed at Grade II*, the middle of the three grades, and the others are at Grade II, the lowest grade. The parish is almost completely rural, and the listed buildings consist of a country house and associated buildings, a church and two tombs in the churchyard, and three milestones.

== Key ==
Grade	Criteria
II*	Particularly important buildings of more than special interest
II	Buildings of national importance and special interest

== Buildings ==
Name and location	Photograph	Date	Notes	Grade
Sibdon Castle; 52.44364°N 2.86586°W		Early 17th century	A country house that was extended later in the 17th century, and further extended and altered in 1744. It is in sandstone and has a moulded cornice, a parapet with pilastered battlements, and a hipped tile roof. The house has an E-shaped plan, two storeys, attics and cellars, an east front of seven bays, and rear gabled wings. The central porch has a moulded cornice, a flat roof, and a quoined arch. The windows on the front are sashes with moulded architraves and keyblocks. The rear wings are the older parts, and contain mullioned and transomed windows, a Venetian doorway, and ball finials on the gables.	II*
Lodge, Sibdon Castle; 52.44256°N 2.86647°W		17th century	The lodge, which was altered in the 18th century, is in sandstone and brick, and has a tile roof with a coped gable facing the drive. There are three storeys and one bay. In the front facing the drive is a blocked window, probably a Venetian window, with a quoined surround and a keyblock, and in the gable is a circular panel in an architrave. There is a 20th-century porch, and the windows are latticed casements with segmental arches.	II
Stables, outbuildings and walls, Sibdon Castle; 52.44345°N 2.86620°W	—	Early 18th century	The buildings are in sandstone and have tile roofs with gables in the centre and at the ends surmounted by ball finials. The buildings form an L-shaped plan, and have one storey. In the centre of the main range is a triple arch with panelled pilasters containing doorways. The windows are mullioned and transomed cross-windows. From the buildings runs a wall to the Lodge, about 90 metres (300 ft) long and between 3 metres (9.8 ft) and 4 metres (13 ft) high.	II*
St Michael's Church; 52.44317°N 2.86508°W		1741	The tower dates from about 1800, and alterations were made in 1872 by Thomas Nicholson, including adding the apse and rebuilding the top of the tower. The church is built in sandstone and has a Welsh slate roof. It consists of a nave, a chancel with an apse, and a west tower. The tower contains a porch, and has a moulded string course, gargoyles, an embattled parapet with quatrefoil roundels, and a weathervane with a flying archangel. The windows in the church are lancets.	II
Milestone at NGR SO 425 837; 52.43869°N 2.85634°W	—	Late 18th or early 19th century	The milestone is on the north side of Long Lane. It is in sandstone, and is about 0.6 metres (2 ft 0 in) high, 0.5 metres (1 ft 8 in) wide, and 0.15 metres (5.9 in) thick. The milestone is inscribed with the distances in miles to London and to Bishop's Castle.	II
Milestone at NGR SO 418 827; 52.43869°N 2.85634°W	—	Early 19th century	The milestone is on the north side of the B4368 road. It is in sandstone with a semicircular head, and is about 0.6 metres (2 ft 0 in) high, 0.4 metres (1 ft 4 in) wide, and 0.1 metres (3.9 in) thick. The inscription is partly legible and indicates the distances in miles to Bishop's Castle and to Clun.	II
Milestone at NGR SO 412 843; 52.45411°N 2.86720°W	—	Early 19th century	The milestone is on the northeast side of Long Lane. It is in sandstone and has a fluted base and a semicircular head. The milestone is inscribed with the distances in miles to London and to Bishop's Castle. It also carries a benchmark.	II
Chest Tomb of William M Dawes; 52.44306°N 2.86510°W	—	1837	The chest tomb is in the churchyard of St Michael's Church. It is in sandstone and consists of a pyramidal moulded slab with fluted pilasters on a chamfered plinth. On the tomb are moulded cartouches, and an inscription stating that he had been a farmer.	II
Chest Tomb of Richard Dawes; 52.44307°N 2.86519°W	—	1857	The chest tomb is in the churchyard of St Michael's Church. It is in sandstone and consists of a pyramidal moulded slab with fluted pilasters on a chamfered plinth. On the tomb are moulded cartouches, and an inscription.	II
