= Listed buildings in Acton Scott =

Acton Scott is a civil parish in Shropshire, England. It contains 17 listed buildings that are recorded in the National Heritage List for England. Of these, two are listed at Grade II*, the middle grade of the three grades, and the others are at Grade II, the lowest grade. The parish contains the villages of Acton Scott, Marshbrook, and Alcaston, and is otherwise rural. The listed buildings include a church and items in the churchyard, a country house and associated structures, other houses, a farm, part of which has been converted into a museum, a bridge, two milestones, and a telephone kiosk.

== Key ==
Grade	Criteria
II*	Particularly important buildings of more than special interest
II	Buildings of national importance and special interest

== Buildings ==
Name and location	Photograph	Date	Notes	Grade
St Margaret's Church; 52.50009°N 2.80619°W		12th century	The oldest part of the church is part of the nave, the tower dates from the 14th century, the porch was added in 1722, the north chapel in 1820, and the chancel and part of the nave were rebuilt later in the 19th century. The church is built in stone, the roof of the nave is tiled, the chancel has a slate roof with a coped gable, and the chapel has a hipped slate roof. The church consists of a nave, a south porch, a north transept, a chancel, and a west tower. The tower has two stages, a clock face on the east side, and an embattled parapet.	II*
Manor Farmhouse; 52.47933°N 2.80044°W	—	1577	A timber framed farmhouse, partly encased in brick, with a tiled roof. There are two storeys and an attic, a front of four bays, and a brick east wing added in about 1926. The bays are all gabled with finials, and are all at different heights, the second bay being a projecting two-storey porch containing a segmental-headed doorway. The windows are mullioned or mullioned and transomed, and in the left gable is a diamond-shaped window.	II
Acton Scott Hall, service court and railings 52.50088°N 2.80310°W		c. 1580	A country house that was altered in about 1811 when Joseph Bromfield remodelled the interior. The house is in brick, the ground floor in stone, and there are stone dressings, quoins, moulded bands, and tiled roofs with moulded coped gables and finials. There are four storeys in the entrance front and three in the garden front. The house has a square plan with three bays on each front and a west wing. Most of the windows are mullioned and transomed, and there are three gables on each front. On the garden front are two-storey canted bay windows. Adjoining the west wing are a greenhouse and buildings with stone-slate roofs that form the service court. The garden is enclosed by iron railings with brick gate piers and an iron gate.	II*
Castle Hill; 52.50294°N 2.82003°W		17th century	A house extensively restored in the 19th century. It is timber framed with rendered infill at the front, with stone at the rear and wings in stone. The house has tiled roofs and has gables with pierced ornamental bargeboards and finials. It has a T-shaped plan, the main part has two storeys, and the wing has one storey and an attic. The upper storey of the main part is jettied with a central gablet.	II
House, barn, cowhouse, and craft shop, Acton Scott Hall; 52.50194°N 2.80340°W		c. 1767	Houses and farm buildings that have been converted to form part of the Acton Scott Working Farm Museum. They form two ranges with an L-shaped plan, and are in brick on a stone plinth with quoins, and have tiled roofs with coped gables, some with pyramid finials and dentil eaves cornices. There is a horse engine house on the north side, and a bull pen on the south side.	II
Coach-house, stables and cowhouse, Acton Scott Hall; 52.50151°N 2.80330°W	—	18th century	The farm buildings consist of a central stable range, a coach house wing, and a shorter cowhouse wing, all forming a U-shaped plan. The central range is in stone, and the wings are in brick on chamfered plinths and have quoins. The roofs are tiled with coped gables, and on the cowhouse wing are dentil eaves and a pyramidal finial. The buildings have a single storey and a loft. Some windows are mullioned and transomed, others are casements, and in the cowhouse are ventilation slits.	II
Gateway, Acton Scott Hall; 52.49982°N 2.80533°W		18th century	The gateway consists of a pair of gate piers, iron gates, and flanking splayed walls. Each pier has a brick shaft, and moulded corner dressings in stone, a stone base, a cap with a moulded cornice, and a finial consisting of a chalice with gadrooning.	II
Marsh Brook Bridge; 52.49480°N 2.81530°W		Late 18th century	The bridge carries a former turnpike road over March Brook; the road is disused having been bypassed by the A49 road. The bridge is in stone, and consists of a single segmental arch with voussoirs, a string course, and large parapets with rounded tops.	II
Milestone; 52.50584°N 2.82373°W	—	Late 18th century	The milestone is on the east side of the A49 road. It is in ashlar stone, and consists of a vertically set slab with a rounded top, and is inscribed in Roman numerals with the distance in miles to Ludlow.	II
Milestone; 52.49498°N 2.81549°W	—	Late 18th century	The milestone was originally on the turnpike road, and was re-set on the east side of the A49 road when it bypassed the turnpike road. It is in ashlar stone, and consists of a vertically set slab with a rounded top, and is inscribed in Roman numerals with the distance in miles to Ludlow.	II
Stackhouse Acton Memorial; 52.50014°N 2.80630°W		Late 18th century	The memorial is in the churchyard of St Margaret's Church, in the angle between the north wall and the north transept, and is to two members of the Stackhouse Acton family who were lords of the manor. It consists of two raised gabled tombs in an enclosure surrounded by cast iron railings.	II
Entrance Lodge, Acton Scott Hall; 52.50415°N 2.80081°W		Early 19th century	The lodge, later used as an office, is in stone and incorporates earlier material. The roof is tiled, there are two storeys, and the lodge has a T-shaped plan. In the centre is a gabled porch, and there is a gable in the left bay, and both have carved bargeboards. The windows on the front are mullioned and transomed or transomed, and at the rear they are casements.	II
Edward Amiss Memorial; 52.49998°N 2.80633°W	—	Early 19th century	The memorial is in the churchyard of St Margaret's Church, and is to members of the Amiss family. It is in ashlar stone, and is a pedestal tomb with a shallow domed top. The tomb is on a chamfered plinth, and has recessed inscribed panels.	II
Thomas Parker Memorial; 52.50003°N 2.80610°W	—	Early 19th century	The memorial is in the churchyard of St Margaret's Church, and is to Thomas Parker and his wife. It is in ashlar stone, and is a pedestal tomb with a stepped pyramidal roof. The tomb is on a moulded plinth, and has a moulded cornice and inscribed panels.	II
Dinah Tomlinson Memorial; 52.49997°N 2.80630°W	—	Early 19th century	The memorial is in the churchyard of St Margaret's Church. It is in ashlar stone, and is a pedestal tomb with a stepped pyramidal roof and a pyramidal finial. On the sides are inscribed oval panels, and in the spandrels are carved gadrooned sunburst patterns.	II
Granary and pigsty, Acton Scott Hall; 52.50164°N 2.80313°W	—	19th century	The granary is in stone with a single storey and a loft, the pigsty is in brick and stone with a single storey, they both have dentil eaves and tiled roofs, and they form an L-shaped plan. On the front of the granary are external steps leading to a loft door, flanked by doorways with segmental heads, and on the back are three doorways. The pigsty has three brick enclosures at the front and a blacksmith's furnace and chimney at the rear.	II
Telephone kiosk 52.47945°N 2.79958°W		1935	A K6 type telephone kiosk, designed by Giles Gilbert Scott. Constructed in cast iron with a square plan and a dome, it has three unperforated crowns in the top panels.	II
