= Marshbrook railway station =

Former railway station in Shropshire, England

Marshbrook
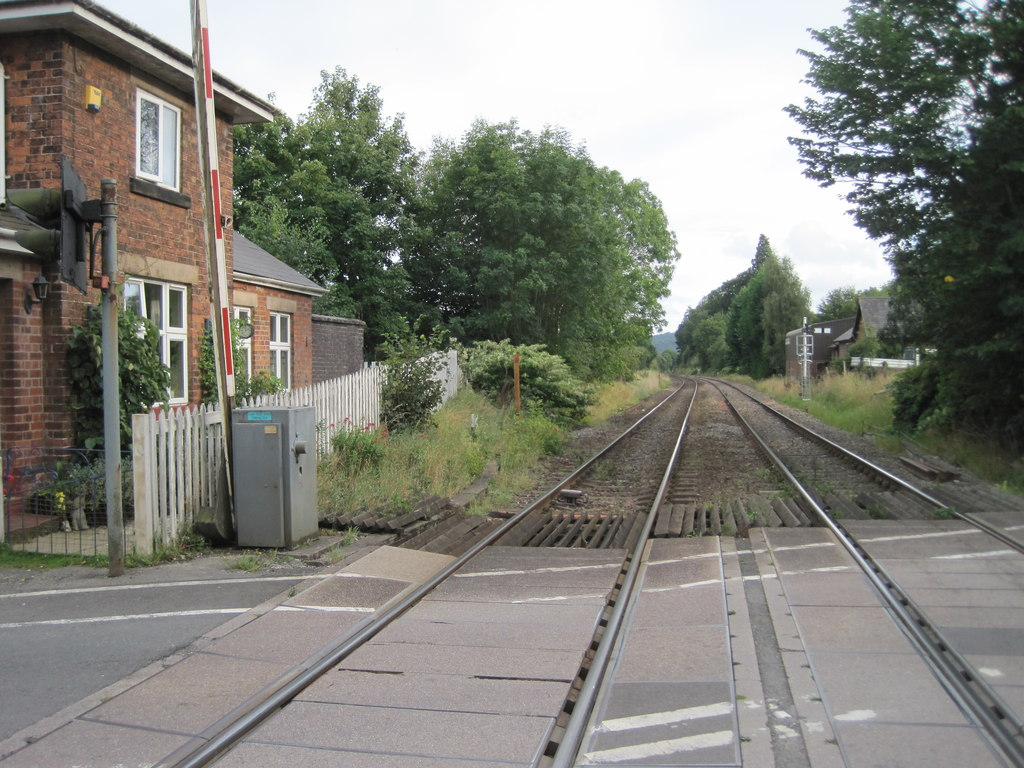
- The site of the station in 2012

General information
- Location: Marshbrook, Shropshire; England
- Coordinates: 52.5030°N 2.8231°W
- Grid reference: SO442897
- Platforms: 2

Other information
- Status: Disused

History
- Original company: Shrewsbury and Hereford Railway
- Pre-grouping: LNWR and GWR joint
- Post-grouping: LMS and GWR joint

Key dates
- 21 April 1852: Opened
- 9 June 1958: Closed
Location

Marshbrook railway station was a station in Marshbrook, Shropshire, England. The station was opened in 1852 and closed in 1958.

== History ==
Marshbrook station was constructed in 1852 for the railway company comprising a stationmaster's house, waiting room and ticket office. The station was closed in 1958 and the building was subsequently used as a private house, before it was demolished in 2019. A signal box and level crossing remain.

== Signal box ==
Marshbrook Signal Box is the oldest operational signal box of its type surviving on the national railway network and was built by the London & North Western Railway in 1872. It was made a Grade II listed building in 2013, in order to save it from the planned removal of mechanical signalling on the line.

Preceding station	Disused railways	Following station
Little Stretton Halt; Line open, station closed	LNWR and GWR joint Shrewsbury and Hereford Railway	Wistanstow Halt; Line open, station closed
