= Cheney Longville Castle =

Fortified manor house in Shropshire, England

Coordinates: 52.45712°N 2.85941°W

Cheney Longville Castle was in the village of Cheney Longville to the north of Craven Arms, Shropshire (grid reference SO417847). It is a much restored 14th century fortified manor house.

The house is quadrangular in shape, 30.48 x 36.58m, and has the remains of its moat to the south and east. The entrance is on the north side through a modern archway. The residential apartments form the north, and part east and west sides which were originally separated from the stable court in the south by a wall.

== History ==
In 1394, Hugh Cheney was granted a licence to crenellate his manor house at "Longefeld". It was attacked and captured in the Civil War, suffering damage by cannon. The house was subsequently rebuilt. The manor was bought in 1682 by John Talbot who in turn sold it in 1745 to William Beddoes, whose descendants still own it.
