= Felhampton =

Hamlet in Shropshire, England

Coordinates: 52.481°N 2.819°W

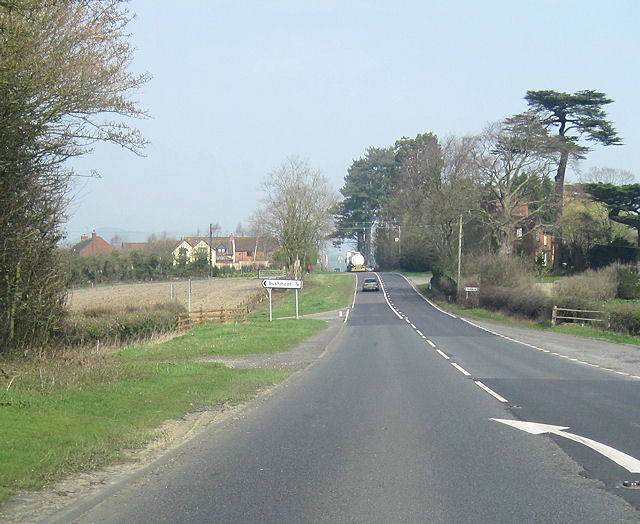
- The A49 road heading north, entering Felhampton

- Location within Shropshire
- OS grid reference: SO443873
- Civil parish: Wistanstow
- Unitary authority: Shropshire
- Ceremonial county: Shropshire
- Region: West Midlands
- Country: England
- Sovereign state: United Kingdom
- Post town: CHURCH STRETTON
- Postcode district: SY6
- Dialling code: 01694
- Police: West Mercia
- Fire: Shropshire
- Ambulance: West Midlands
- UK Parliament: Ludlow

Felhampton is a hamlet in Shropshire, England. It is around 3.5 miles (5.6 km) north of Craven Arms, and 17 miles (27 km) south of Shrewsbury. The hamlet is located by the A49 road.

== See also ==
- Listed buildings in Wistanstow
