= Woolston, south Shropshire =

Coordinates: 52.480°N 2.849°W

Woolston
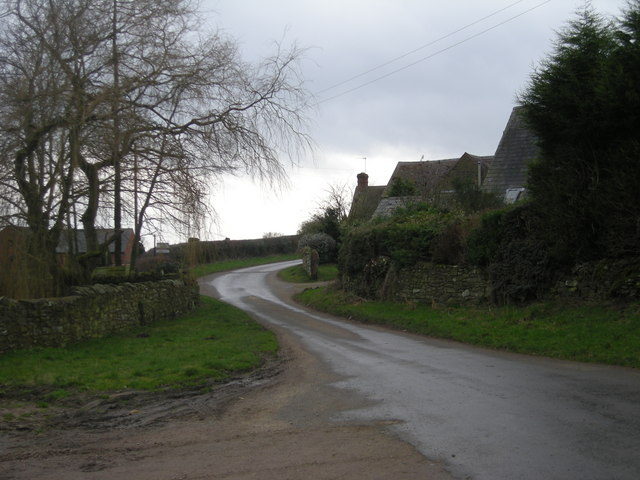
- The hamlet of Woolston, south Shropshire

- Location within Shropshire
- OS grid reference: SO424872
- Civil parish: Wistanstow
- Unitary authority: Shropshire
- Ceremonial county: Shropshire
- Region: West Midlands
- Country: England
- Sovereign state: United Kingdom
- Post town: Church Stretton
- Postcode district: SY6
- Dialling code: 01694
- Police: West Mercia
- Fire: Shropshire
- Ambulance: West Midlands
- UK Parliament: Ludlow

Woolston, in the south of the county of Shropshire, England, is a hamlet located in the parish of Wistanstow, one mile northwest of that village, near Craven Arms (in the Church Stretton and Craven Arms county electoral division of Shropshire unitary authority, previously part of the district of South Shropshire until its abolition in 2009).

In the mediaeval period the name was variously spelt Wolfreston, Wolureston and Wylfriston; the Domesday Book survey recorded that in 1066 it had been held by Spirtes the priest along with Wistanstow.
