= Acton Scott =

Village in Shropshire, England

Coordinates: 52°30′06″N 2°48′15″W

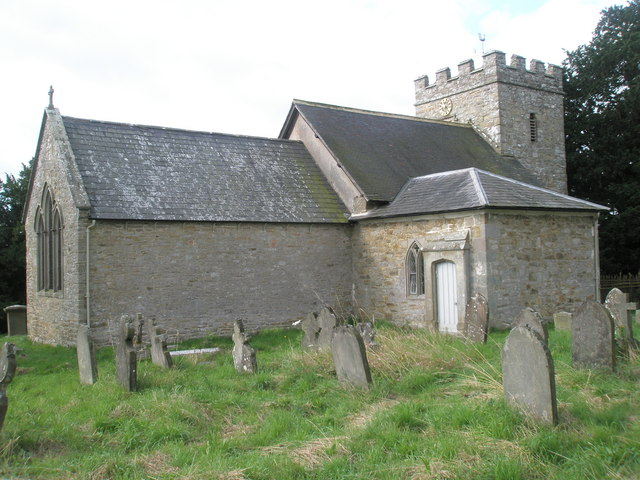
- The parish church of Acton Scott

- Location within Shropshire
- Population: 104 (2011)
- OS grid reference: SO454895
- Civil parish: Acton Scott
- Unitary authority: Shropshire
- Ceremonial county: Shropshire
- Region: West Midlands
- Country: England
- Sovereign state: United Kingdom
- Post town: CHURCH STRETTON
- Postcode district: SY6
- Dialling code: 01694
- Police: West Mercia
- Fire: Shropshire
- Ambulance: West Midlands
- UK Parliament: Ludlow

Acton Scott is a village and parish near Church Stretton in Shropshire, England. The population of the civil parish at the 2011 Census was 104. It lies in the Shropshire Hills Area of Outstanding Natural Beauty. The settlement was recorded as Actune in the 1086 Domesday Book.

The Acton family live on the 1,500-acre (6.1 km^{2}) manorial estate and have worked it since the twelfth century.

It is most well known for the 30-acre (120,000 m^{2}) Acton Scott Historic Working Farm, founded by the estate's then owner, Tom Acton, in 1975. A Victorian living museum, it featured in the 2009 Victorian Farm BBC TV series. Visitors to the farm could take part in various workshops and courses on such activities as turning butter, hand-milking cows and herding live-stock. Many skills such as bodging, forging, pole-lathing, wheel and brick-making were demonstrated. The museum, which was run by Shropshire Council on lease from the Acton Scott manor estate, closed in June 2021 for economic reasons. The Council relinquished the lease to the estate in 2023. The museum was reopened on 18 April 2025, funded by a charity, under the title of Acton Scott Heritage Farm.

== See also ==
- Listed buildings in Acton Scott
