= Wistanstow =

Village in Shropshire, England

Coordinates: 52.466°N 2.833°W

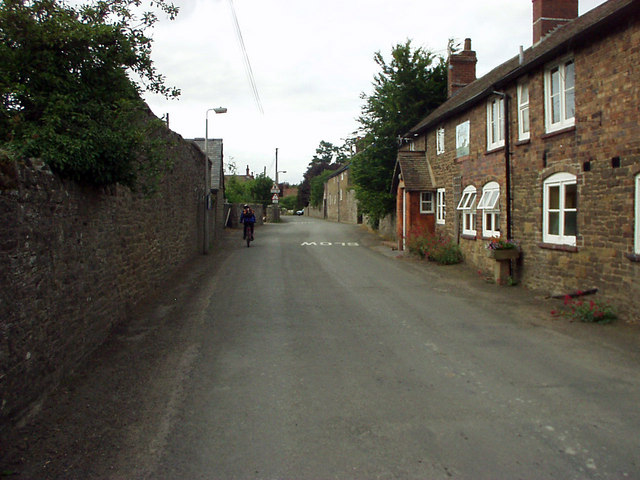
- Main street through Wistanstow village

- Location within Shropshire
- Area: 8.17 sq mi (21.2 km^{2})
- Population: 812 (2011)
  - Density: 99/sq mi (38/km^{2})
- OS grid reference: SO434857
- Civil parish: Wistanstow
- Unitary authority: Shropshire
- Ceremonial county: Shropshire
- Region: West Midlands
- Country: England
- Sovereign state: United Kingdom
- Post town: CRAVEN ARMS
- Postcode district: SY7
- Dialling code: 01588
- Police: West Mercia
- Fire: Shropshire
- Ambulance: West Midlands
- UK Parliament: Ludlow

Wistanstow is a village and parish in Shropshire, England. Wistanstow is located about 5 miles (8.0 km) south of Church Stretton and 8 1/2 miles (13.7 km) north of Ludlow. It is about 2 miles (3.2 km) north of Craven Arms. It is just off the main Shrewsbury-Hereford road, the A49. The large parish, of 5,231 acres (8.2 sq mi; 2,100 ha), includes a number of other small settlements: Woolston, Upper Affcot, Cwm Head, Bushmoor, Strefford, Whittingslow, Felhampton and Cheney Longville, and a population of 724 was recorded in the 2001 census, increasing to 812 at the 2011 Census.

The River Onny flows through the parish, southwest of the village, also Leamoor Common and Wettles are to the north of the village.

== History and amenities ==
The main lane running through the village is a Roman road, which ran between the Roman settlements and forts at Leintwardine and Wroxeter.

The village takes its name from the Anglo-Saxon saint Wigstan who was the grandson of the King of Mercia. He was martyred at this location by his great‑uncle. (Note: June 1 – St. Wistan, Prince of Mercia, Martyr in Butler's Lives of Saints) His burial took place at his family crypt at the abbey of Rependon (now known as Repton) the Mercian capital, memorialized as St. Wystan upon his canonization (one of the oldest unaltered places of Christian worship in England). The Saxon suffix stow means (enclosed) place. An uncle of W(ystan) H(ugh) Auden (named for the eponymous saint spelled Wystan by his father who was an alumnus of Repton school built on the remains of the Abbey) wrote the entry for Wistanstow in Little Guide to Shropshire (Note: see also Calder, who refers to Carpenter's biography of Auden)

The present church building, Holy Trinity, was mainly built between 1180 and 1200. The nave roof of 1630 is one of the church's finest features and was re-gilded in the mid-1960s. The interior is also graced by a number of early 19th century box pews and fine mid-20th-century wooden panelling behind the altar. It contains a war memorial plaque to local men who died serving in the World Wars and another to Lieutenant Colonel Henry Beddoes who was lost when S.S. Chiosa hit a wartime mine off Sicily in January 1919.

Wistanstow has a splendid mock Tudor village hall that was given to the village in 1925 by a local landowner. This enormous "black‑and‑white" building included cottages for the district nurse and resident caretaker. The village has a small church primary school.

At the other end of the village opposite Manor Farm is the Plough Inn. Just behind was a small independent real ale brewery, "Wood's", founded in 1980, which closed under "adverse trading conditions" in 2022 following the COVID-19 pandemic. In 1984, both the Plough and the brewery were featured as the final destination on a Shropshire edition of Treasure Hunt, with Anneka Rice pulling herself a pint of real ale to complete the game. "The Smithy" is the village's community shop which was officially opened by the actor Pete Postlethwaite OBE, a local parishioner in April 2000. Once the workplace of a local blacksmith and little more than the size of a shed, the shop stocks all the basics, with as much as possible sourced from local suppliers.

== See also ==
- Listed buildings in Wistanstow
