= Stokesay =

Village in Shropshire, England

Coordinates: 52.431°N 2.831°W

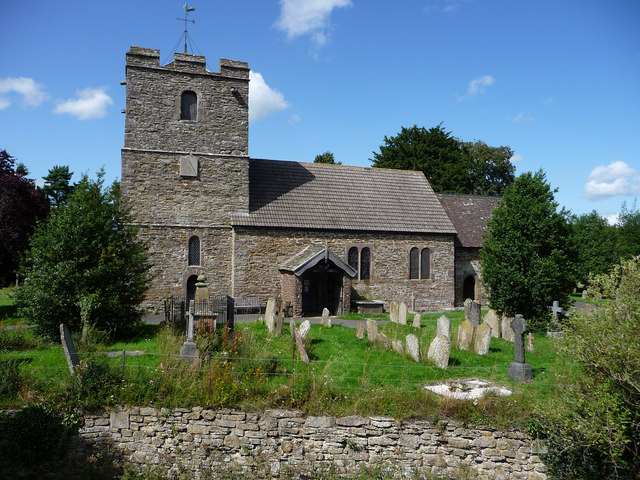
- Church of St John the Baptist, Stokesay

- Location within Shropshire
- OS grid reference: SO435818
- Civil parish: Craven Arms
- Unitary authority: Shropshire
- Ceremonial county: Shropshire
- Region: West Midlands
- Country: England
- Sovereign state: United Kingdom
- Post town: CRAVEN ARMS
- Postcode district: SY7
- Dialling code: 01588
- Police: West Mercia
- Fire: Shropshire
- Ambulance: West Midlands
- UK Parliament: Ludlow

Stokesay is a village and former civil parish, now in the parish of Craven Arms, in the Shropshire district, in the ceremonial county of Shropshire, England. It is just south of Craven Arms on the A49 road, also fleetingly visible from the Shrewsbury to Hereford Welsh Marches railway line. In 1961 the parish had a population of 1217.

Less than a mile to the north is the small town of Craven Arms and 6 miles to the south east is the larger, historical market town of Ludlow. On 1 April 1987 the parish was abolished and merged with Halford to form Craven Arms. These two older entities continued as parish wards, however a review of the governance of Craven Arms in 2012 concluded in the abolition of these two wards from May 2013.

The River Onny runs past Stokesay, on its way south, and the bridge which carries the A49 over the river is Stokesay Bridge. Within the former parish, to the south of the hamlet of Stokesay is Stoke Wood and the hamlet of Aldon (grid reference SO435795); to the northeast is the hamlet of Whettleton (grid reference SO441823).

Nearby, on the outskirts of Craven Arms, is the Shropshire Hills Discovery Centre, with its grass roof easily seen from the A49. Also in Craven Arms is the nearest railway station, which for over a hundred years was named Craven Arms and Stokesay, before a rename in 1974.

== Saxon & Norman history ==
In the mid 10th century, the manor of Stoke was held by Wild Edric, a Saxon nobleman, notable for his strenuous resistance to the Normans immediately after the Norman Conquest of England. The Normans wrested the manor from his hands and granted it in their normal fashion to a notable Norman as a reward for his part in the Conquest, one Picot de Say, also known as William de Picot. It was this man who had a house and church built some time after 1068.

=== Domesday Book ===
Stokesay is recorded in the Domesday Book of 1086 as Stoches. It had 47 households, making it a well-populated manor; neighbouring Aldon manor was also well-populated. Stokesay formed part of the Saxon hundred of Culvestan.

== Attractions ==
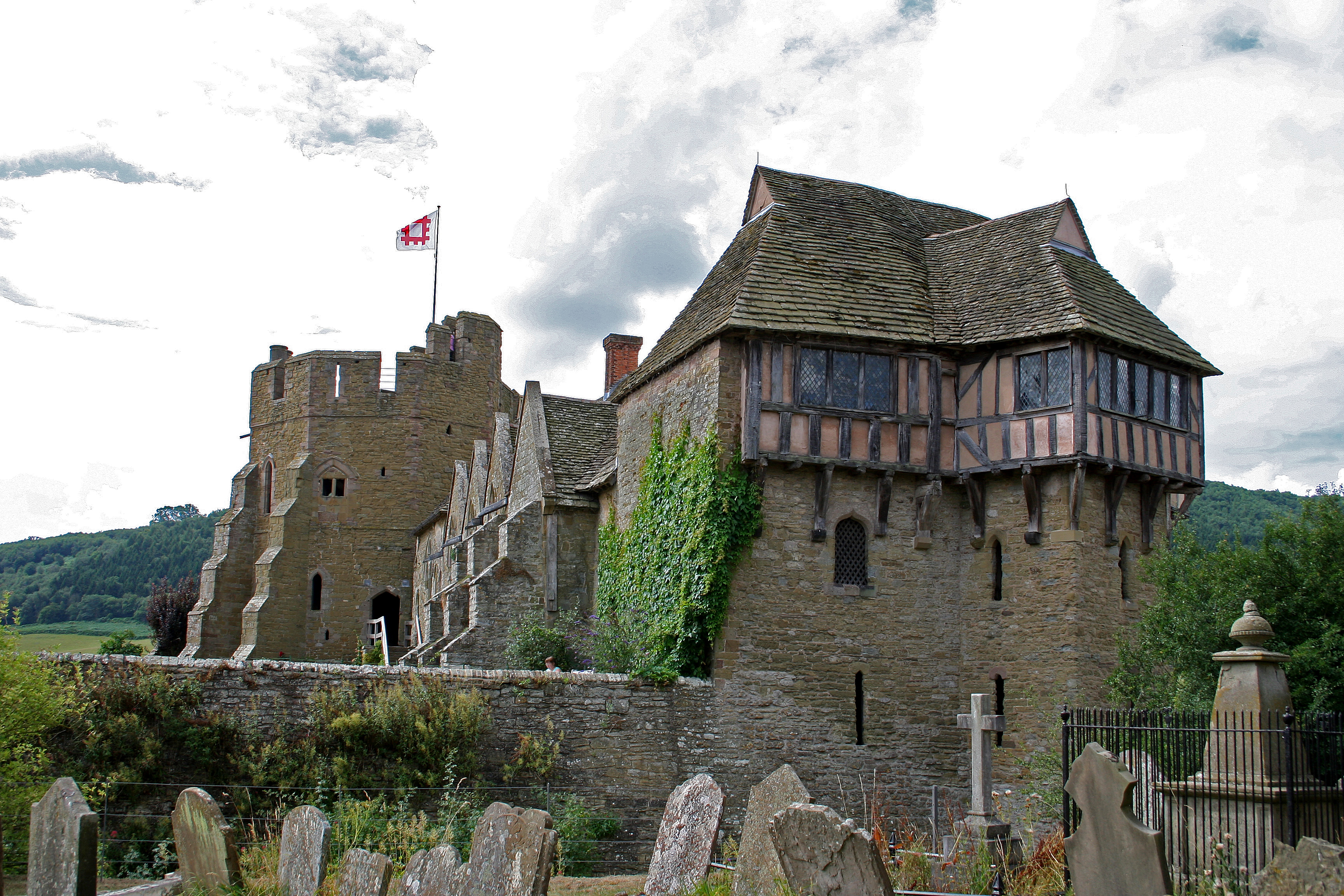
The castle viewed from the churchyard

Stokesay is famous for Stokesay Castle, a fortified manor house and one of the best preserved and oldest examples of the type in the country.

The hamlet, which even today comprises just a church, a working farm and a few houses, was previously known as simply Stoke, a widespread English placename meaning 'enclosure'.

The Church of St John the Baptist, Stokesay is dedicated to St John the Baptist and is a rare example of the Commonwealth style (having been rebuilt during the Commonwealth of England under Oliver Cromwell's rule). John Derby Allcroft became Lord of the Manor and Patron of Saint John the Baptist church.

The Craven Arms parish war memorial, with its statue of a World War I infantryman, since 1956 has stood in Stokesay churchyard, having previously stood where it was unveiled in 1921 in the main junction of Craven Arms town opposite the hotel the town is named for. The figure has been known as "Old Bill" for its resemblance to the Bruce Bairnsfather cartoon character.

The film Atonement was filmed in part near Stokesay at the mansion Stokesay Court.

== Folklore ==
According to legend, Stokesay was once the home of two giants, one of whom lived on View Edge, and the other on Norton Camp. They kept their treasure in Stokesay Castle, but upon losing the key to the castle, they both died of grief.

== Rail Access ==
- Craven Arms railway station

== See also ==
- Listed buildings in Craven Arms
