= Listed buildings in Craven Arms =

Craven Arms is a civil parish in Shropshire, England. It contains 23 listed buildings that are recorded in the National Heritage List for England. Of these, two are listed at Grade I, the highest of the three grades, and the others are at Grade II, the lowest grade. The parish contains the small town of Craven Arms, the hamlets of Halford and Stokesay, and the surrounding countryside.

Craven Arms was a small settlement before the arrival of the railways in 1852, and has since developed into a market town. The most important buildings in the parish are Stokesay Castle, its gatehouse, and the nearby church, which are listed at Grade I. Most of the other listed buildings are houses, cottages, farmhouses and farm buildings, many of which are timber framed. The remaining listed buildings include another church, tombs, memorials and gates in the churchyard of St John the Baptist's Church, a hotel and associated building, a weir and associated structures, a milestone, a former toll house, and two war memorials, one in the form of a lych gate.

== Key ==
Grade	Criteria
I	Buildings of exceptional interest, sometimes considered to be internationally important
II	Buildings of national importance and special interest

== Buildings ==
Name and location	Photograph	Date	Notes	Grade
Church of St John the Baptist, Stokesay; 52.43072°N 2.83117°W		12th century	The church was badly damaged in the Civil War, the nave was rebuilt in 1654 and the chancel in 1664. The Church of St John the Baptist, Stokesay is built in sandstone with tiled roofs, and consists of a nave, a south porch, a chancel and a west tower. The tower has three stages, a sundial, an embattled parapet, and a weathervane. The south doorway is Norman in style. Inside the furnishings and wall paintings date from the late 17th century.	I
St Thomas' Church; 52.44497°N 2.83086°W		c. 1200	The church was restored in 1848, and again in 1887 by Thomas Nicholson when the chancel was added, and the west wall was rebuilt. It is built in sandstone with a tile roof, and consists of a nave, a south gabled porch, and a chancel, and on the west gable is a twin bellcote. The nave and the doorway, which has a carved hood mould, are Norman in style, most of the windows are lancets, and in the chancel are two-light Decorated windows.	II
Stokesay Castle, gatehouse and walls		1391–1400	This is a fortified house, and the gatehouse was added in the 17th century. The house is in sandstone with some timber framing, and has a stone-tile roof. It consists of a great hall with a jettied upped floor to the north, cross-wings, and a polygonal tower to the south with an embattled and embrasured parapet. The gatehouse is timber framed with plaster infill. It has two storeys and an attic, and contains casement windows and moulded bressumers. The castle stands on a moated site, and the retaining walls are included in the listing. The building is also a Scheduled Monument.	I
Withersley; 52.40904°N 2.83522°W	—	Early to mid-16th century	A timber framed farmhouse with infill in brick and plaster, and a hipped corrugated iron roof over thatch. There is one storey and an attic, and a jettied gable with a moulded bressumer. The windows are casements, and there is a gabled dormer.	II
141 Newton; 52.43756°N 2.83052°W		Late 16th to early 17th century	A timber framed house with plaster infill on a sandstone plinth with weatherboarding on the left side and a tile roof, and a massive stone chimney stack. In the gable end is a moulded bressumer on scrolled consoles. There are two storeys, one bay, and a lean-to on the left. The windows are casements.	II
Rowton Manor; 52.41932°N 2.86960°W	—	Late 16th or early 17th century	The farmhouse was altered and extended in the 19th century. The original part is stuccoed over a timber framed core, and the extension is in rendered brick. The roof is in Welsh slate, and there are two storeys and a cellar. The eaves have scalloped bargeboards, there is a canted bay window, most of the windows are casements, and some are sashes. Inside is exposed timber framing.	II
The Old Rectory; 52.43815°N 2.83143°W		Late 16th or early 17th century	A timber framed house divided into two dwellings, with plaster infill and a stone-tile roof. It consists of a main block with a gable towards the road and a rear wing, with two storeys and an attic, and a wing to the right with one storey and an attic. In the gable end is a moulded bressumer on scrolled consoles. The wing contains a 20th-century bay window and a gabled dormer, and the other windows are casements.	II
2 and 3 Newton; 52.43760°N 2.83108°W		17th century	A pair of timber framed houses with plaster and brick infill on a sandstone plinth with tiled roofs. They have two storeys, casement windows, and gabled eaves dormers. No. 2 has a gabled porch, and a stone lean-to on the left with a Welsh slate roof, and above the door of No. 3 is a flat hood.	II
House at Lower Aldon Farm; 52.40998°N 2.83153°W	—	17th century	The house, which was extended in the 19th century, is timber framed with plaster infill and a Welsh slate roof. There are two storeys and one bay, and it contains a casement window. The extensions, which are in brick and stone, form a T-shaped plan.	II
House adjacent to Stokesay Castle Hotel; 52.43828°N 2.83244°W	—	17th century	A timber framed house with plaster infill and a corrugated iron roof. It has one storey and an attic, and a lean-to on the right. In the ground floor is a mullioned and transomed window, above is a two-light casement window, and in the gable is a four-light casement window.	II
Old Newton; 52.43768°N 2.83125°W	—	17th century	A timber framed house with plaster infill and a tile roof. There is one storey and an attic, two bays, and a brick lean-to on the left. Above the door is a simple hood, the windows are casements, and there are two gabled dormers.	II
Barn east of Whettleton Farmhouse; 52.43587°N 2.82284°W	—	17th century (or earlier)	The barn is timber framed with weatherboarding, and has a corrugated iron roof. There are five bays, and various openings.	II
Chest tomb 52.43055°N 2.83076°W	—	18th century	The chest tomb is in the churchyard of St John the Baptist's Church. It is in sandstone and is richly carved with a sunburst and a cherub. The tomb is surmounted by an urn.	II
Weir, sluice, walls and culvert 52.43155°N 2.82804°W	—	18th century (probable)	The structure is on the River Teme, and was extended in 1822 by Thomas Telford. It is in stone, and consists of a weir in the form of an elongated crescent directing water into a culvert on the western side. On the eastern side is a double sluice with a single surviving cast iron rack and pinion gate. There are retaining walls on both sides of the weir.	II
Milestone; 52.43926°N 2.83579°W		Late 18th century	The milestone stands by a roundabout at a road junction. It is in sandstone, and consists of an obelisk about 6 metres (20 ft) high. Inscribed on it are the distance to 36 towns and cities.	II
Craven Arms Hotel; 52.43953°N 2.83591°W		Late 18th or early 19th century	A coaching inn, later a hotel, it is in red brick, partly rendered, with a hipped Welsh slate roof. The original block has two storeys and three bays. On the front it is rendered between brick Tuscan pilasters with stone bands and moulded capitals. In the centre is a timber porch on Doric columns with a mullioned hood and an entablature with triglyphs and guttae. To the right and recessed is a later taller block with three storeys and four bays. The windows are sashes.	II
Outbuildings and wall, Craven Arms Hotel; 52.43980°N 2.83618°W	—	Early 19th century	The former stables have a rectangular plan and consist of a central three-storey block in brick, flanked by two-storey wings in stone. There is a central carriage entrance with a segmental head, and at the top of the central block is a stone pedimented gable with a rendered tympanum. In the wings are blocked openings with segmental heads, and casement windows. Attached to the northeast is a brick wall about 4 metres (13 ft) high and 30 metres (98 ft) long.	II
Morris Monument; 52.43063°N 2.83062°W	—	Early 19th century	The monument is in the churchyard of St John the Baptist's Church, and is to the memory of members of the Morris family. It is ornate, on a stone plinth, it has Classical motifs, and is surmounted by an urn.	II
The Old Vicarage; 52.42978°N 2.82696°W	—	Early 19th century	The vicarage, later a private house, is stuccoed and has a Welsh slate roof. There are two storeys, three bays, and rear wings. The central doorway has a fanlight and an open pediment hood on pilasters, and the windows are sashes.	II
Toll Cottage; 52.44231°N 2.81849°W	—	1848	A toll house, later a private house, it is roughcast with quoins, and has a tile roof with a gable facing the road. There is a single storey and an attic, and a rear wing. In the centre is a gabled porch with side windows, the other windows are casements, and there is an inscribed tablet.	II
Gates and gate piers, St John the Baptist's Church; 52.43050°N 2.83100°W		19th century	The gates are at the entrance to the churchyard. They are ornate, and in wrought and cast iron. The gate piers are in sandstone, and are tapering, with caps.	II
War memorial, St John the Baptist's Church; 52.43092°N 2.83180°W		c. 1919	The war memorial is in the churchyard of St John the Baptist's Church, having been moved here from Craven Arms. It is in sandstone and consists of the statue of an infantryman on a stepped plinth. Inscribed on the plinth are the names of those lost in the two World Wars.	II
Halford War Memorial Lych Gate; 52.44499°N 2.83038°W		1920	The lych gate was built as a war memorial following the First World War, and stands at the entrance to the churchyard of St Thomas' Church, Halford. It consists of two stone walls with a timber superstructure and a gabled roof. The gables have cusped and chamfered bargeboards, and there are gates at the eastern end. There are inscriptions on the tie beams, an inscribed panel on the southern side, and a plaque on the northern side with the names of those lost.	II
