= Craven Arms =

Town in Shropshire, England

Coordinates: 52.440°N 2.835°W

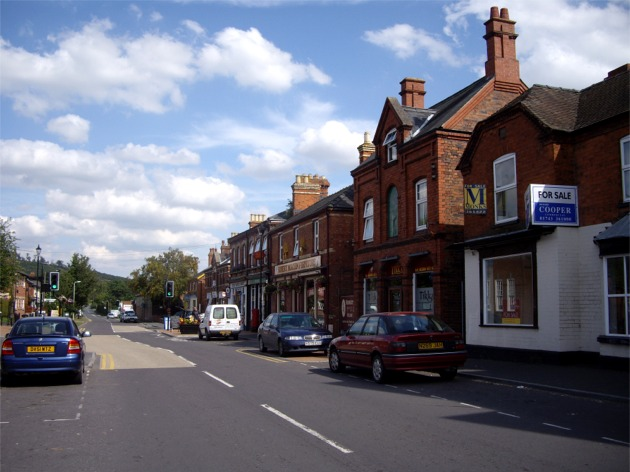
- Corvedale Road

- Location within Shropshire
- Population: 2,289
- OS grid reference: SO432828
- Civil parish: Craven Arms
- Unitary authority: Shropshire
- Ceremonial county: Shropshire
- Region: West Midlands
- Country: England
- Sovereign state: United Kingdom
- Post town: CRAVEN ARMS
- Postcode district: SY7
- Dialling code: 01588
- Police: West Mercia
- Fire: Shropshire
- Ambulance: West Midlands
- UK Parliament: South Shropshire
- Website: https://visitcravenarms.co.uk/

Craven Arms is a market town and civil parish in Shropshire, England. It is sited on the A49 road and the Welsh Marches railway line, which link it north and south to the larger towns of Shrewsbury and Ludlow respectively. The town is enclosed to the north by the Shropshire Hills Area of Outstanding Natural Beauty and to the south is the fortified manor house of Stokesay Castle.

Economically, the town serves the surrounding rural area, with a number of shops, estate agents, a supermarket, an abattoir and many commercial/light industrial businesses. It is also a visitor destination, being home or nearby to a number of attractions, and is a centre for visitors to the area of outstanding natural beauty. It describes itself as the Gateway to the Marches.

== History ==
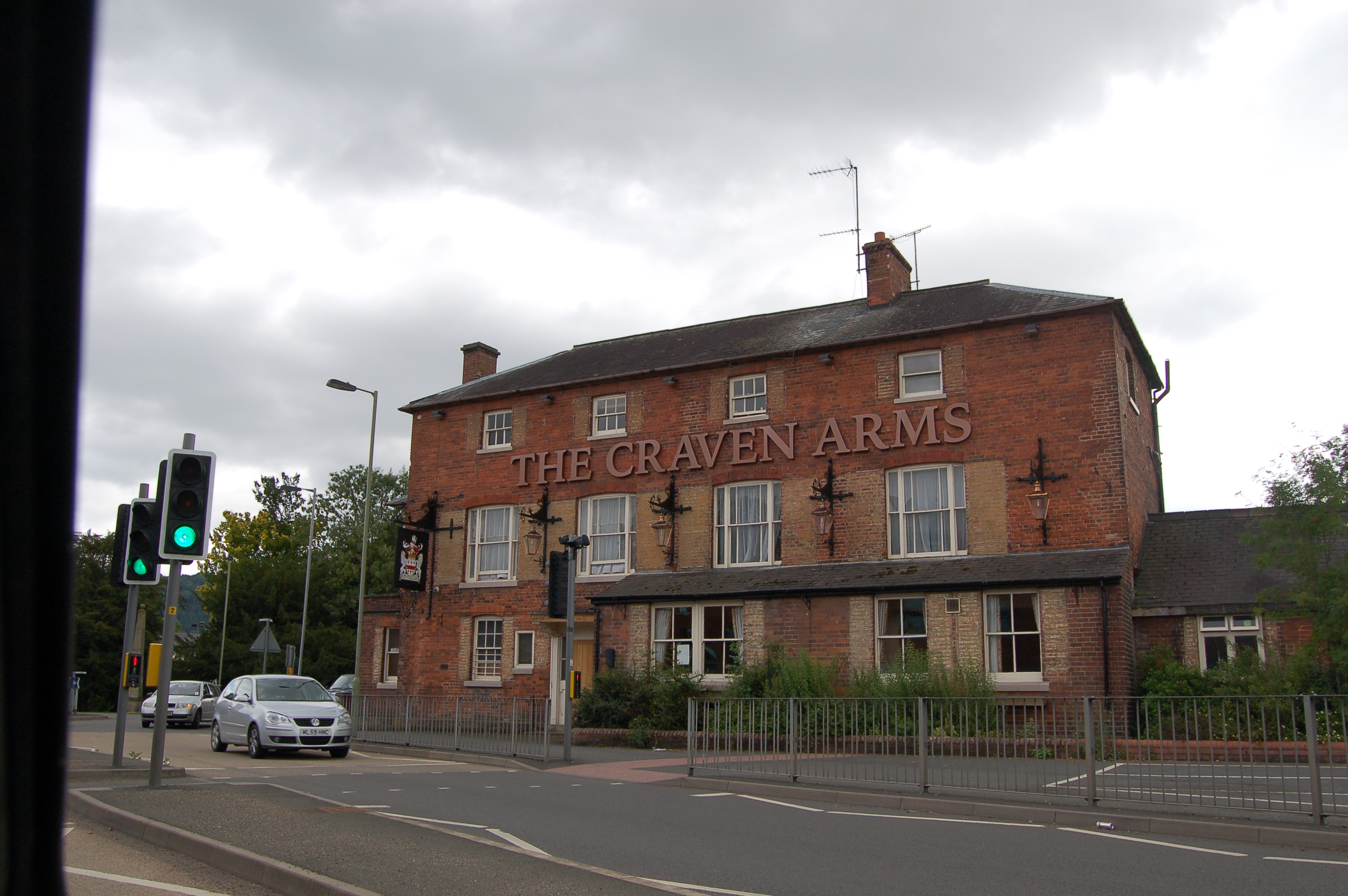
The Craven Arms, namesake of the town

Craven Arms is a relatively new town (for Shropshire), being only a small village called Newton on a map of 1695. The settlement grew when the railway station came during the mid to late 19th century, making it a railway town. Newton or Newtown is still the name for the southeastern part of the present day town, while the northern part is called Newington or New Inn (another small village which existed prior to the town). The town takes its name from the Craven Arms Hotel, which was situated on the junction of the A49 and B4368 roads, which in turn is named after the Earls of Craven (who owned nearby Stokesay Castle).

The civil parish of Craven Arms was formed in 1987 by the merging of two older parishes: Stokesay and Halford. These two older entities continued as parish wards; however, a review of the governance of the parish in 2012 concluded that these two wards would be abolished from May 2013. Small parts of the settlement overlap into neighbouring Wistanstow and Sibdon Carwood parishes.

== Geography ==
Nearby towns are Bishop's Castle, Clun, Church Stretton and Ludlow, of which the last is the most substantial with 10,000 inhabitants.

The River Onny flows to the town's east and just over the river is the small village of Halford. To the south is the small village of Stokesay, while to the north is the village of Wistanstow.

Wenlock Edge is located to the north-east of the town and runs in a northeasterly direction, towards Much Wenlock.

== Transport ==
Craven Arms railway station lies at the junction of the Welsh Marches Line and the Heart of Wales Line, 20 miles (32 km) south of Shrewsbury. All passenger trains calling at the station are operated by Transport for Wales, who also manage it. Most services run along a route between Carmarthen, Cardiff Central, Hereford, Shrewsbury, Crewe and Manchester Piccadilly; there are also irregular trains north to Holyhead and south-west to Llandrindod.

Minsterley Motors operate two bus routes which connect Craven Arms with Ludlow, Church Stretton, Shrewsbury and Pontesbury.

== Attractions ==
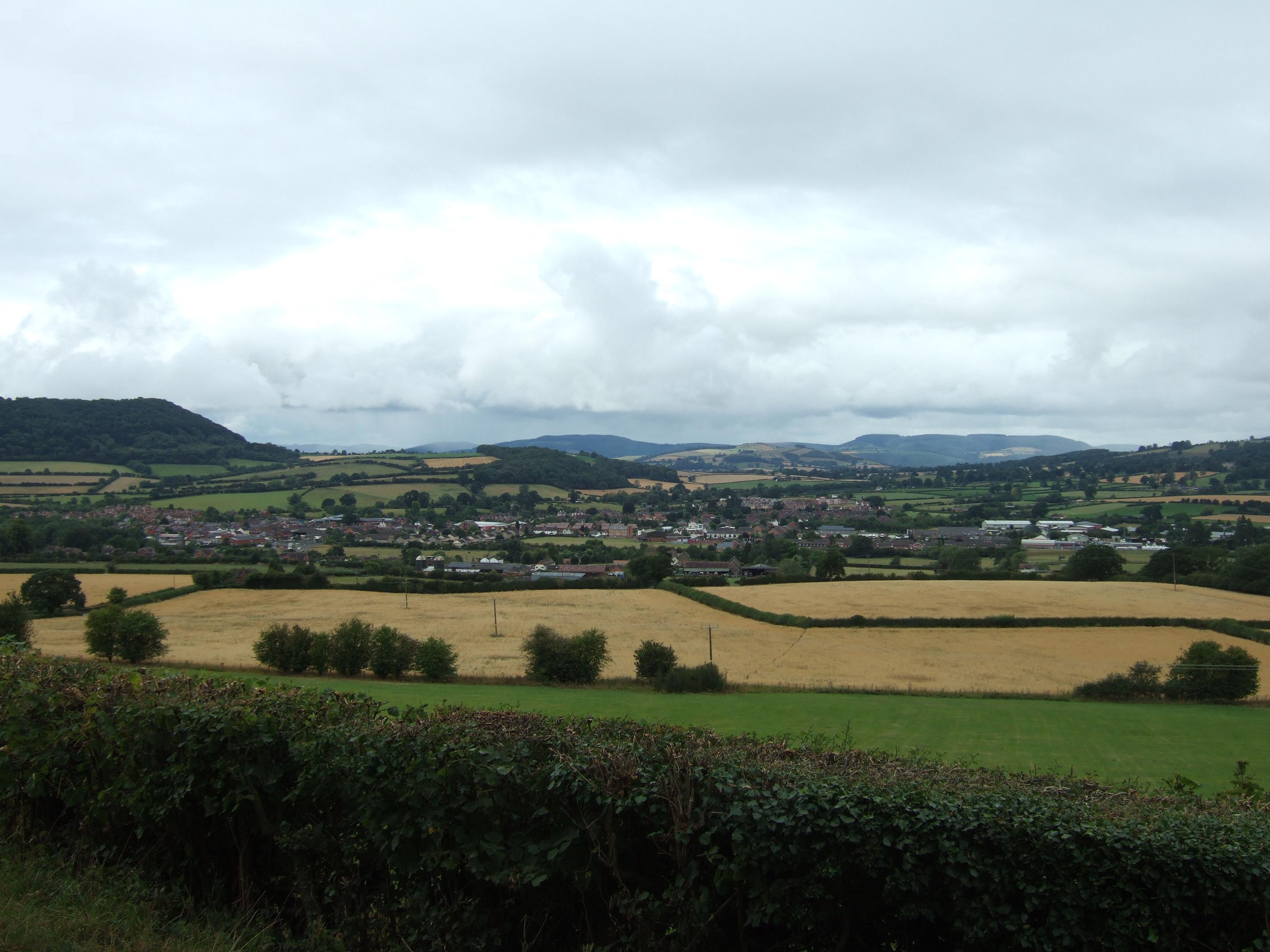
View of the town from the east

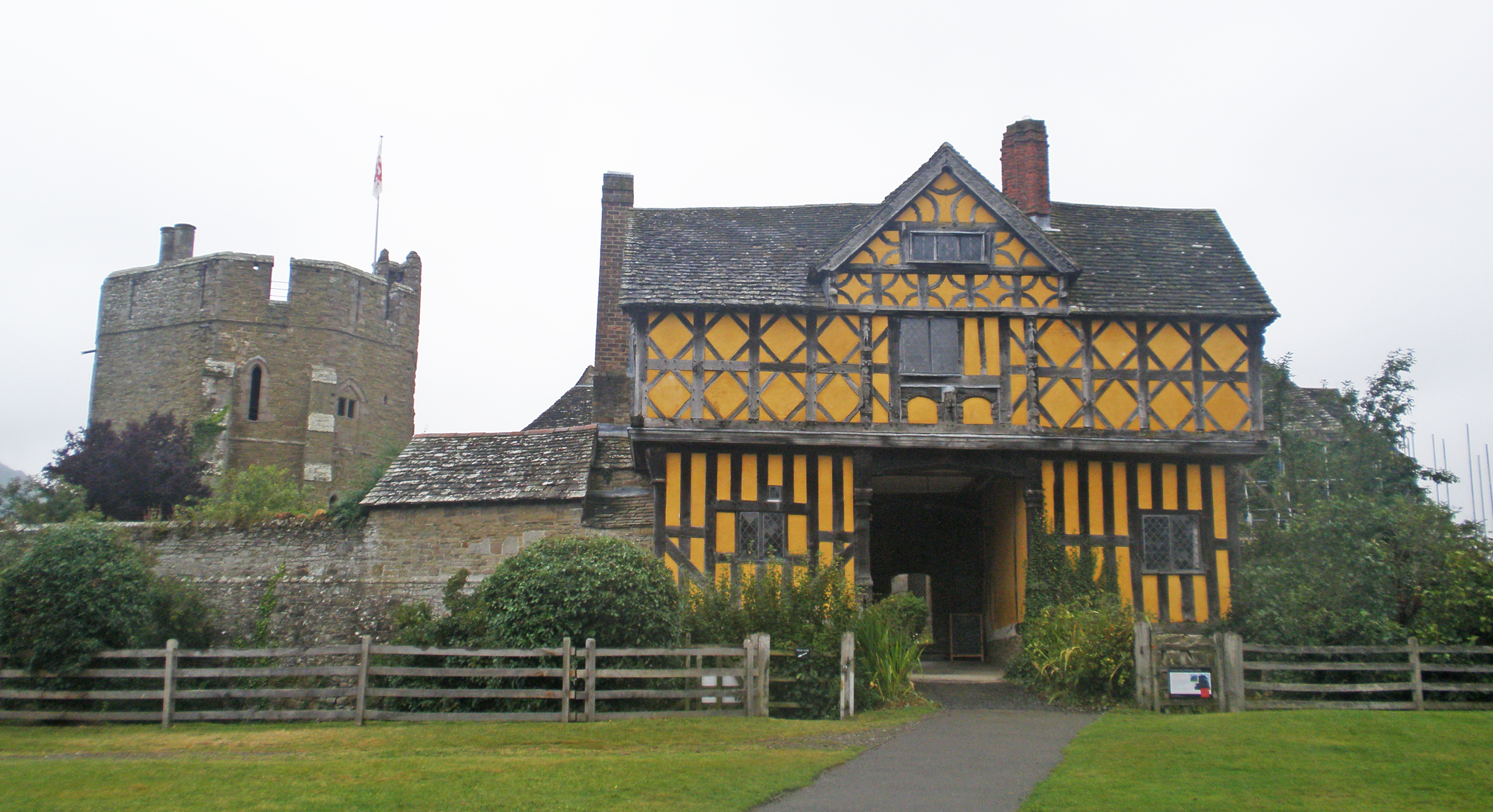
Stokesay Castle

There are two main visitor attractions in the Craven Arms civil parish. In the town there is the Shropshire Hills Discovery Centre, a centre featuring exhibits about the county's geography; and Stokesay Castle which is a fortified manor house located within the parish, just south of the town. Stella Mitchell's Land of Lost Content Museum, a collection of 20th-century memorabilia, also stood in the town until closed in 2023.

== Religious sites ==
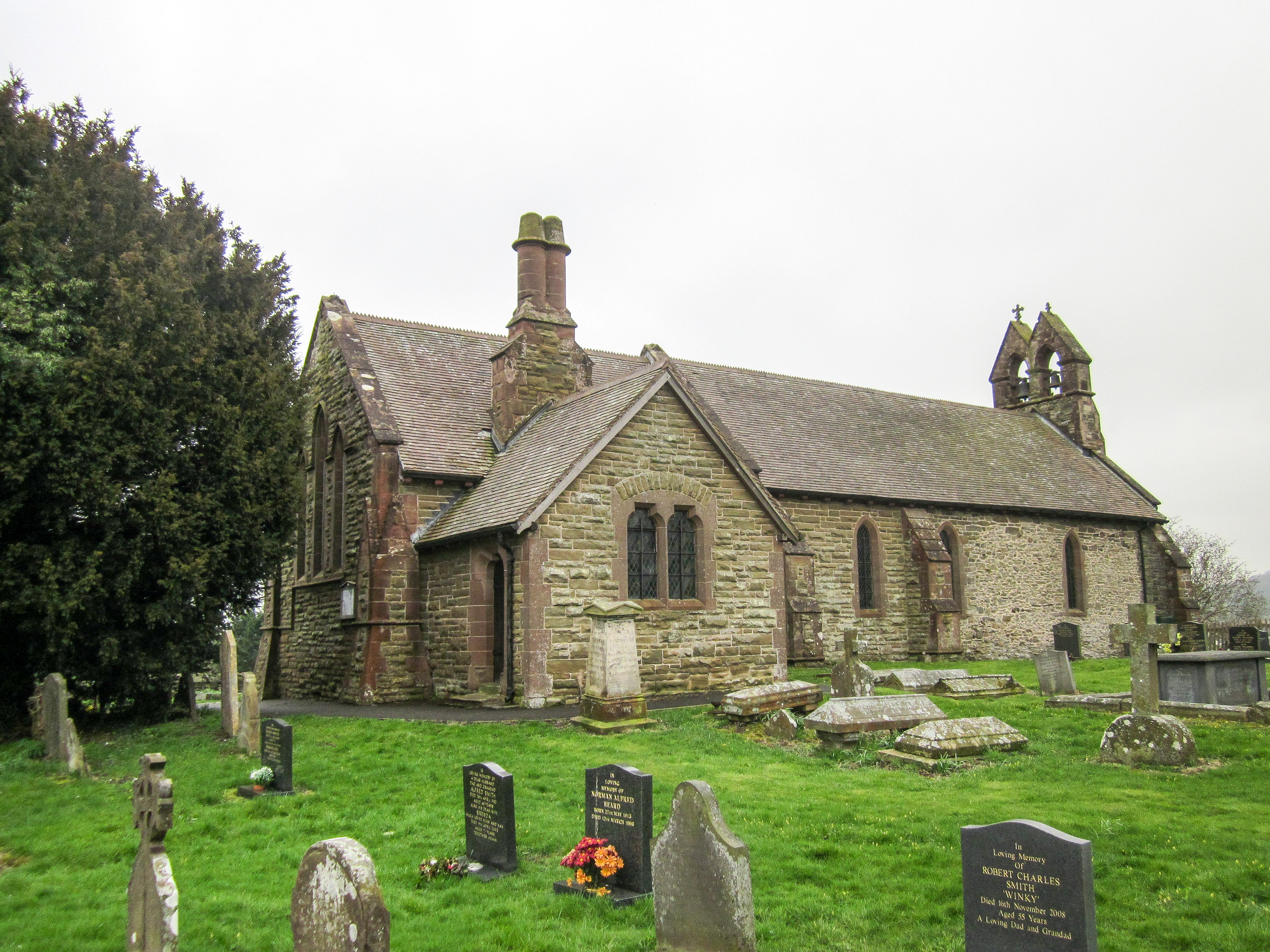
St Thomas' Church, Halford, Craven Arms

Craven Arms is home to several churches. The Anglican parish church is the grade II listed church of St Thomas, outside the town in the village of Halford. The grade I listed Church of St John the Baptist, Stokesay is south of the town near Stokesay Castle. St Andrews Community Church in the town centre describes itself as "non-denominational, evangelical & charismatic", and there is a Methodist church, and a Jehovah's Witnesses' Kingdom Hall. A small Islamic centre is in the town on Newton Street. This is the only mosque serving the surrounding Shropshire Hills: the nearest other mosques are in Shrewsbury and Telford.

== Recent development ==
The town has recently gone through a phase of expansion and this looks set to continue with the (2009 abolished) South Shropshire District Council stating that they wished to see the town become the district's second main market town (after Ludlow) by 2026. Much of the recent housing development is on the west side of the town, whilst commercial development is taking place more on the northern end. Development potential towards the east is restricted by the floodplain of the River Onny, whilst to the south lies the historically important Stokesay Castle.

The town centre itself has seen some notable developments in recent years, with new commercial buildings built on Dale Street by the A49 road. Additionally, to the immediate south of the town centre is the Shropshire Hills Discovery Centre which opened in 2001 and some new housing.

== Notable people ==
- Brian Farley (1927 in Craven Arms – 1962) an English professional footballer who played for Chelmsford City and Tottenham Hotspur.

== Cultural links ==
- Bruce Chatwin wrote On the Black Hill whilst staying at Cwm Hall near the town.
- The film Atonement was filmed in part at Stokesay Court, three miles south of Craven Arms.

== See also ==
- Listed buildings in Craven Arms
