= Laurence of Ludlow =

English wool merchant (died 1294)

Laurence of Ludlow (c. 1250–1294) was a medieval English wool merchant, money lender and builder of Stokesay Castle.

== Biography ==
Laurence of Ludlow was the son of Nicholas of Ludlow, a prominent Shropshire wool merchant. He amassed a fortune in the medieval English wool trade and established a career as a money lender through his loans to Edward I of England, and other members of the English nobility.

He purchased the manor of Stokesay in 1281 and entertained the Bishop of Hereford and the Abbot of Haughmond there in 1290. In 1291, he received a licence from the King to strengthen his manor house with a stone wall and to crenellate the property which subsequently became known as Stokesay Castle. By the 1290s, Ludlow was leading a consortium of the most powerful English wool merchants and in 1294, was responsible for the introduction of an export duty on wool termed the 'Maleot'. This satisfied the King's demands for more revenue from the wool trade but placed the burden of the tax on the wool-producers rather than the merchants.

Ludlow drowned in the English channel during a storm while sailing to Flanders in 1294. Of his death, a Dunstable Priory annalist wrote 'and because he sinned against the wool mongers he was drowned in a ship laden with wool'.
