= Shropshire Hills Discovery Centre =

Coordinates: 52.4372°N 2.8327°W

Shropshire Hills Discovery Centre is a museum in southern Shropshire, just south of Craven Arms.

== The Museum ==
The museum offers exhibitions around the Shropshire Hills, an Area of Outstanding Natural Beauty, and informs people about the history, geography, and biology of the area. The exhibition includes a life sized model mammoth, Iron Age roundhouse, and film of the area including drone footage. Other facilities include a local art gallery, gift shop, crafts room, and café. So far more than a million people have visited this centre, since it officially opened in 2001.

A local charity, Grow Cook Learn, owns and manages the building, which was set up as a Millennium project to help with tourism.

== Onny Meadows ==
As part of the Shropshire Hills Discovery Centre, Onny Meadows has been turned into a tourist and education site to help promote the Shropshire Hills, and countryside. The name for the meadows was taken from the River Onny which flows along the 11 acres meadow site boundary. The meadow includes planted wildflowers, hedgerows, and trees/woodland, and is managed by a volunteer group.

A variety of events are held within the visitor centre and meadows, these included guided walks and talks. Walking paths are available and are suitable for wheelchair usage on site, paths range from short walks around the site to longer circular routes starting from the centre.

=== Wildlife opportunities ===
The Centre is continuously working to develop the Onny Meadows to support wildlife. In 2024, the team launched a new wetland area to encourage and support a diverse range of species. This area is open to the public with a hide and screen for observing wildlife.
