= Brian Farley =

English footballer

Personal information
- Full name: Henry Brian Farley
- Date of birth: 1 January 1927
- Place of birth: Craven Arms, England
- Date of death: 4 December 1962 (aged 35)
- Position: Central defender

Youth career
- Chelmsford City

Senior career*
Years	Team	Apps	(Gls)
1945–1949	Chelmsford City	32	(0)
1949–1951	Tottenham Hotspur	1	(0)
- * Club domestic league appearances and goals

Henry Brian Farley (1 January 1927 – 4 December 1962) was an English professional footballer who played for Chelmsford City and Tottenham Hotspur.

== Playing career ==
Farley began his career at non-League club Chelmsford City before joining Tottenham Hotspur in July 1949. The central defender made one appearance for the Lilywhites. His first and last senior match for Tottenham was against Middlesbrough on 18 August 1951 at Ayresome Park. In a 2-1 reverse, Farley scored an own goal.
