= Halford, Shropshire =

Hamlet in Shropshire, England

Coordinates: 52.445°N 2.830°W

Halford
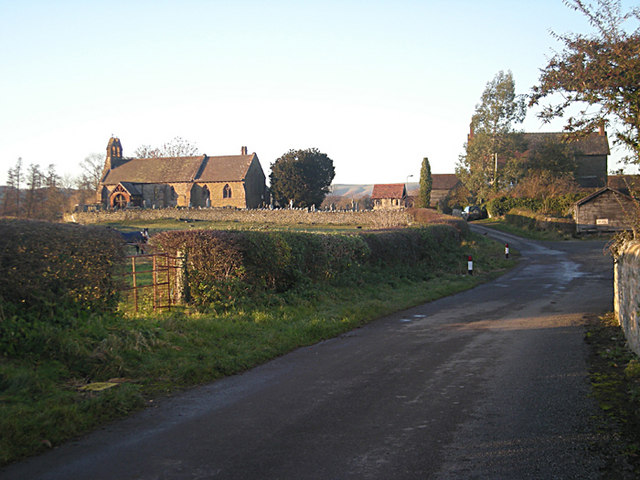
- The church at Halford

- Location within Shropshire
- OS grid reference: SO435833
- Civil parish: Craven Arms
- Unitary authority: Shropshire
- Ceremonial county: Shropshire
- Region: West Midlands
- Country: England
- Sovereign state: United Kingdom
- Post town: CRAVEN ARMS
- Postcode district: SY7
- Dialling code: 01588
- Police: West Mercia
- Fire: Shropshire
- Ambulance: West Midlands
- UK Parliament: Ludlow

Halford is a hamlet and former civil parish, now in the parish of Craven Arms, in the Shropshire district, in south Shropshire, England. It lies just east of the market town of Craven Arms, on the other side of the River Onny. In 1961 the parish had a population of 167.

The grade II listed church of St Thomas at Halford is the Anglican parish church of Craven Arms.

== History ==
Until the 19th century, Halford was a detached part of the parish of Bromfield. The detached part ran up Long Lane, on the other side of the River Onny. Being part of Bromfield brought it into the hundred of Culvestan and from c. 1100 that of Munslow (Lower Division). Bromfield Priory held land at Halford, explaining the connection.

Halford was formerly a chapelry in Bromfield parish, from 1866 Halford was a civil parish in its own right, on 1 April 1987 the parish was abolished to form Craven Arms, parts also went to Sibdon Carwood and Wistanstow.

Halford and Stokesay continued as parish wards, however a review of the governance of Craven Arms in 2012 concluded that these two wards would be abolished from May 2013.

== See also ==
- Listed buildings in Craven Arms
