= Church of St John the Baptist, Stokesay =

St John the Baptist, Stokesay
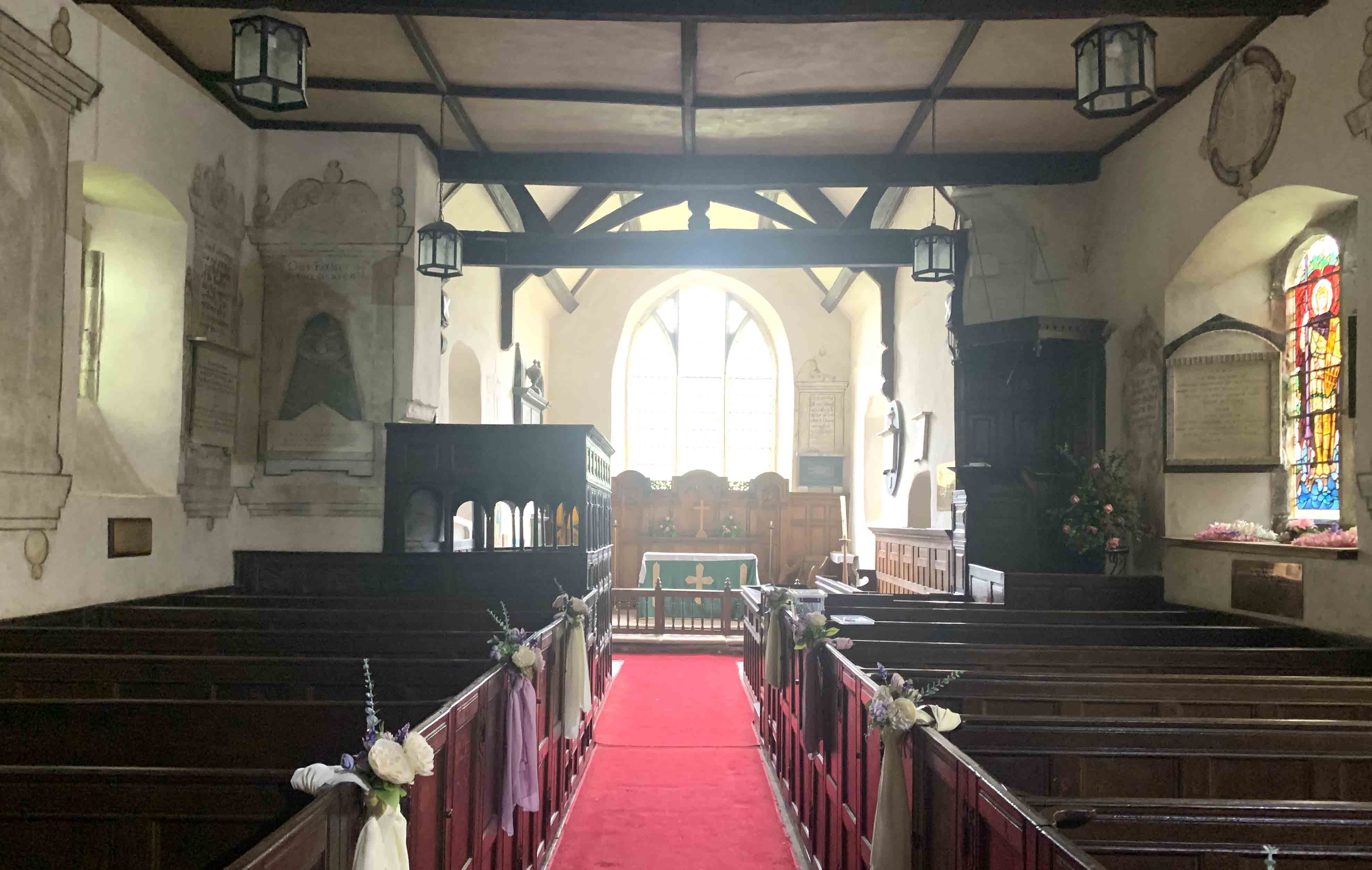
- Interior of St John the Baptist, Stokesay
- St John the Baptist, Stokesay
- 52°25′51″N 2°49′52″W
- OS grid reference: SO 43586 81741
- Location: Stokesay, Shropshire
- Country: England
- Denomination: Church of England

History
- Founded: c. 1150

Architecture
- Heritage designation: Grade I listed
- Style: Early English, Puritan
- Years built: c. 1150, rebuilt c. 1654

Administration
- Diocese: Hereford
- Archdeaconry: Ludlow
- Parish: Craven Arms

Clergy
- Vicar: Revd Clive Munday

The Church of St John the Baptist is a Grade I listed Church of England church in Stokesay, Shropshire, England, adjacent to Stokesay Castle. The church first dates from around 1150, and was probably the chapel to the castle. It was badly damaged during the English Civil War, and rebuilt in 1654. The church consists of a nave, a south porch, a chancel and a west tower. The tower has three stages, a sundial, an embattled parapet, and a weathervane. The south doorway is Norman in style. The interior of the church, including the furnishings and wall paintings, dates from the late 17th century. It was listed Grade I on 12 November 1954.

== History ==
=== Origins ===
The Church of Saint John the Baptist was first founded in the 12th century, during the reign of Henry II. It was built around 1150 as a chapel to Stokesay Castle, originally built by the de Lacy family. Most likely the building expanded as the castle site developed in the 13th century.

=== 17th Century ===
The church was heavily damaged during the English Civil War. In 1646 a Royalist party took refuge in the church along with their horses, but they were driven out by Parliamentarian soldiers who had captured Stokesay Castle. During the battle, much of the church was destroyed. The south side of the nave - which faces the castle - was completely destroyed, most likely by cannon fire. The north side of the church was less badly damaged.

The church was largely rebuilt after the war. Hence Stokesay church offers a relatively rare example of a church rebuilt during the Puritan period, 1654. The date can be made out on the tablet at the head of the tower arch. Some of the original Norman features still survive at lower levels, particularly on the north side of the building. The church nave retains its stop-chamfered raking strut roof which dates from 1664. The pews, panelled and hooded pulpit, reading desk, box-pews and wall paintings all date from the 17th Century.

== Today ==
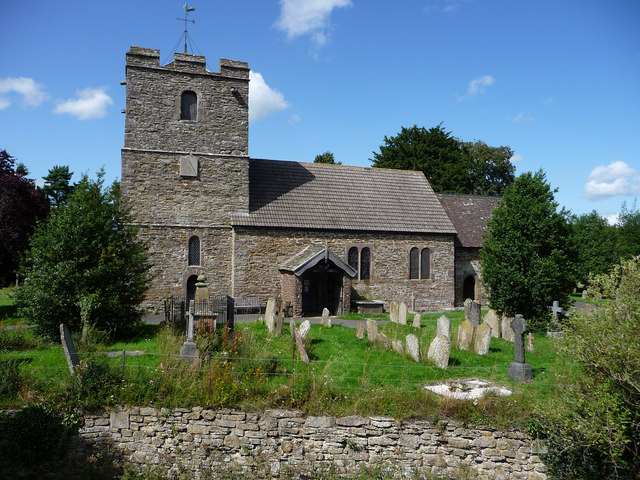
St John the Baptist, Stokesay - geograph.org.uk - 1507214

Among the most striking features are the biblical texts on the walls which date from the 17th Century. The church also boasts a "two decker pulpit", original box pews, as well as rare canopied pews. The West Gallery still survives, with a staircase leading to it and at the north side, space for musicians.

The Craven Arms parish war memorial, with its statue of a World War I infantryman, since 1956 has stood in the churchyard, having previously stood where it was unveiled in 1921 in the main junction of Craven Arms town opposite the hotel the town is named for, The Craven Arms. The figure has been known as "Old Bill" for its resemblance to the Bruce Bairnsfather cartoon character.

The church is today the parish church of Craven Arms, with services at 9:45am on the second and fourth Sunday of each month, and a service of either Communion or Morning Prayer (both using the Book of Common Prayer) at 10:30am on Thursdays. The church is open for visitors in accordance with the opening hours of Stokesay Castle.

== See also ==
- Grade I listed buildings in Shropshire
- Stokesay, Shropshire

== Gallery ==
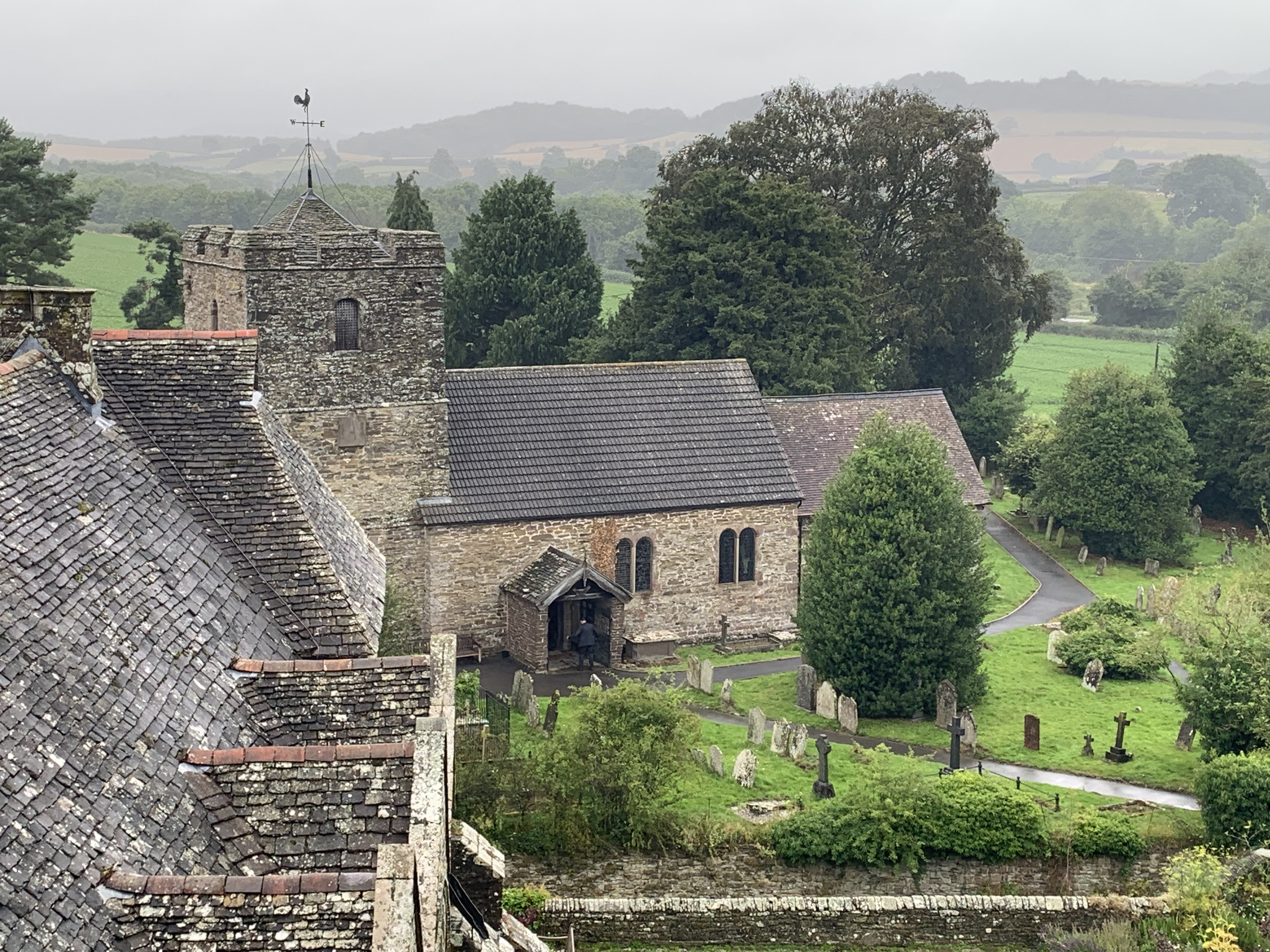
St John The Baptist church viewed from Stokesay Castle

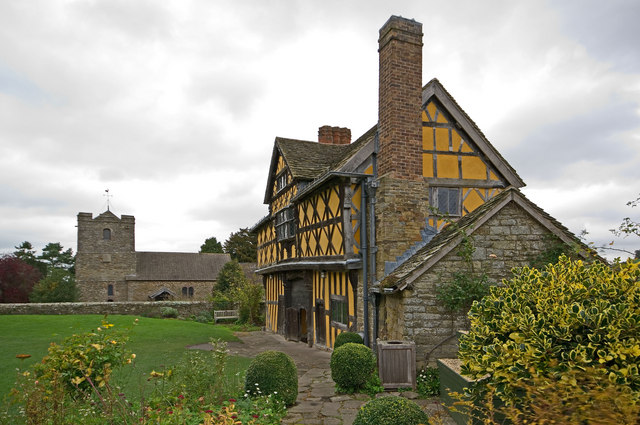
Church and Castle Gatehouse

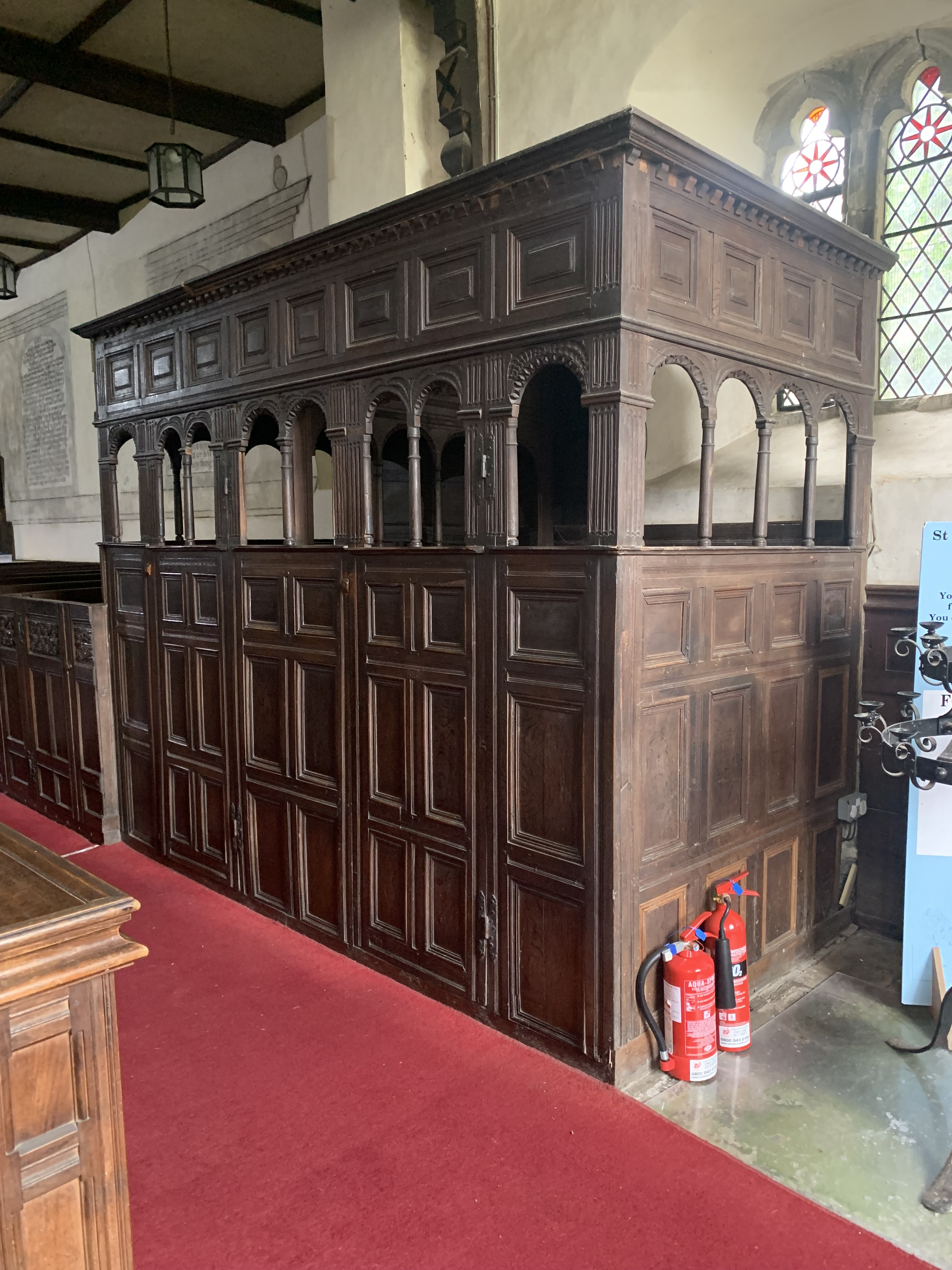
Covered Box Pew

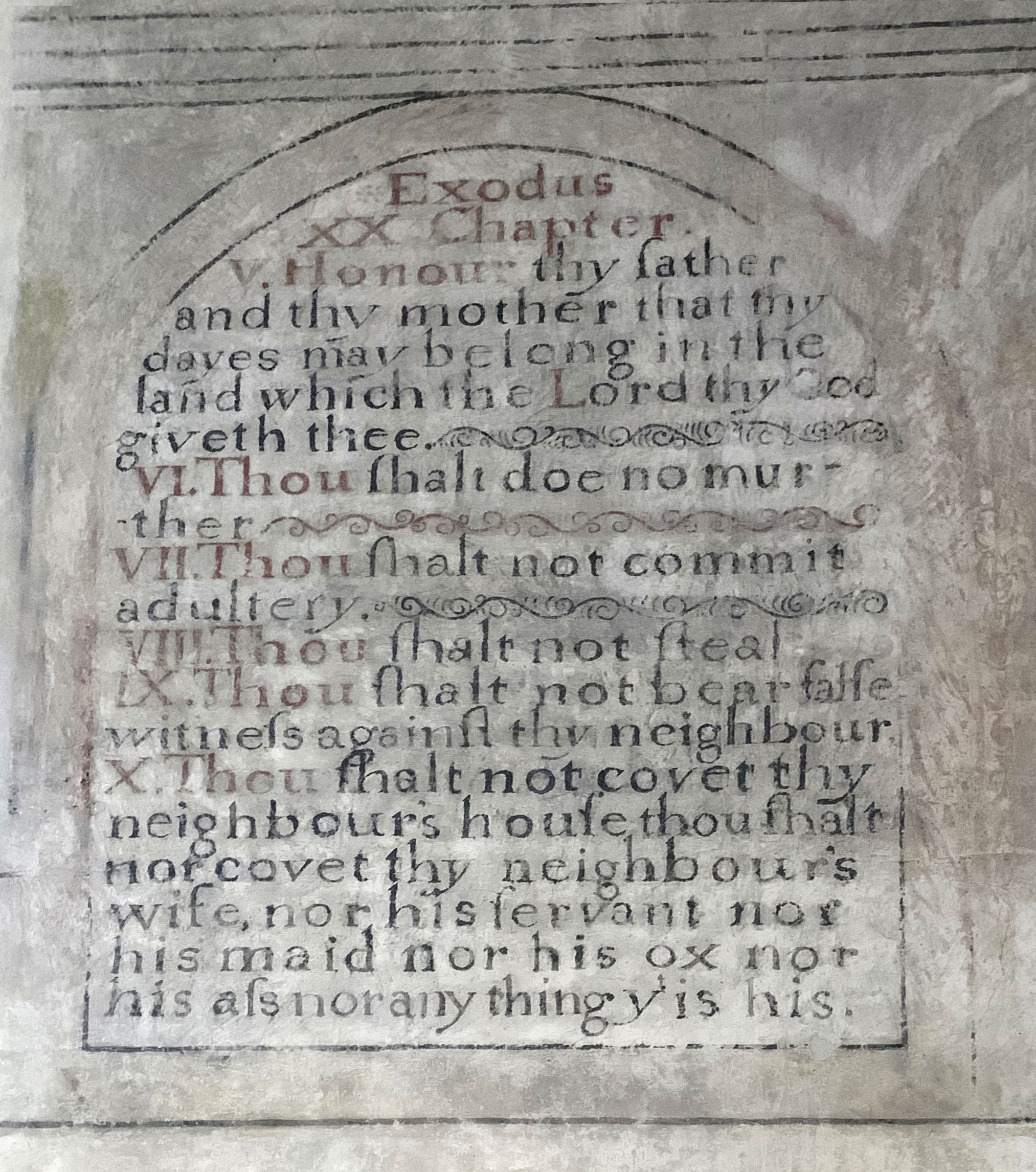
Ten Commandments

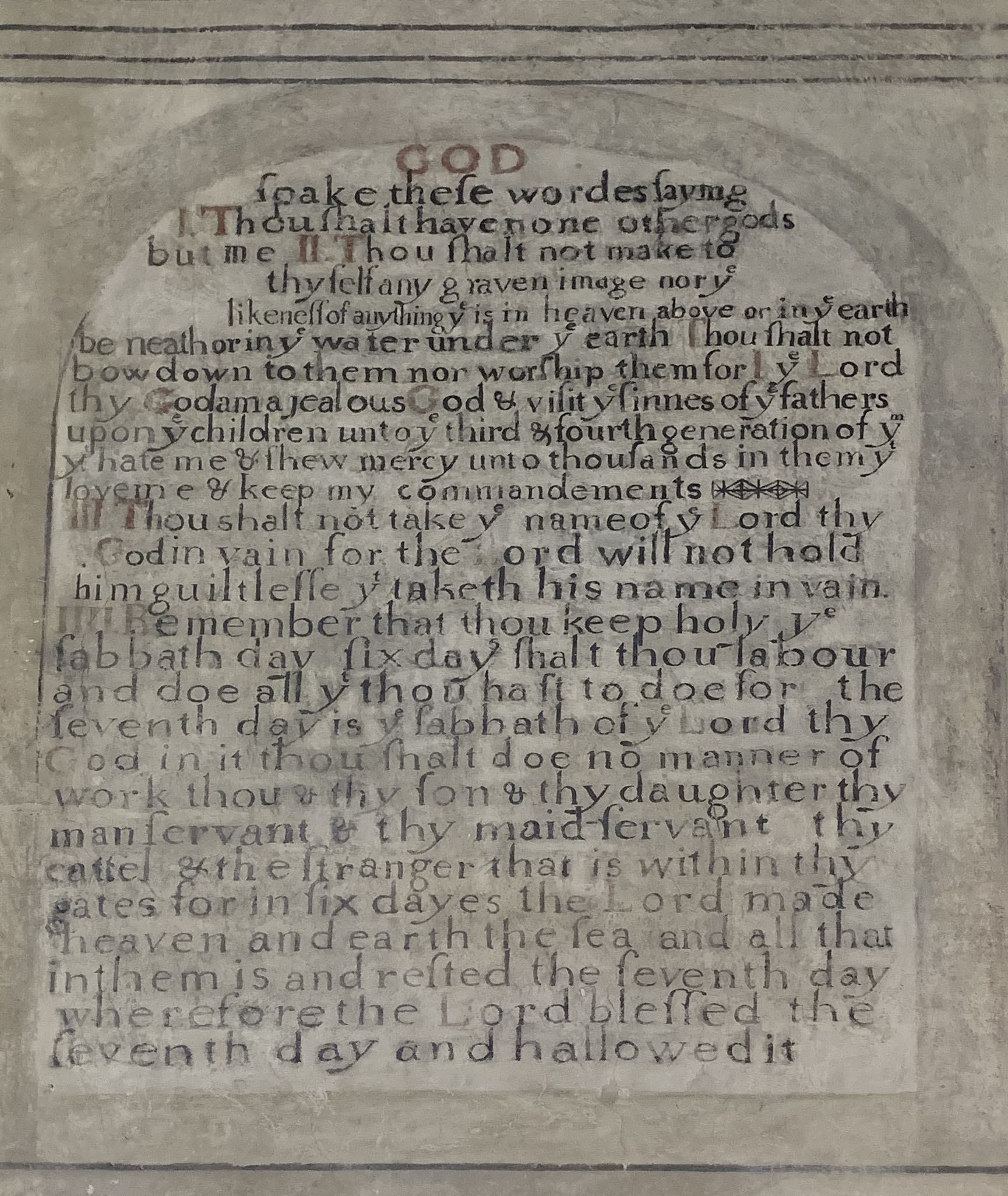
Ten Commandments
