= Hope Bowdler =

Village in Shropshire, England

Coordinates: 52.527°N 2.775°W

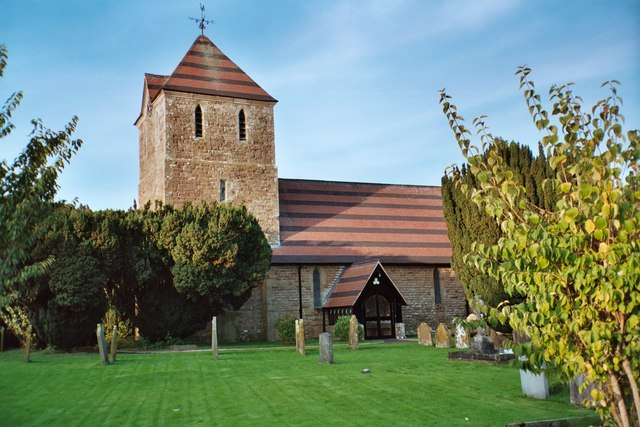
- St Andrew's church in the village

- Location within Shropshire
- Population: 233 (2011)
- OS grid reference: SO475924
  - London: 157 miles (252 km)
- Civil parish: Hope Bowdler
- Unitary authority: Shropshire
- Ceremonial county: Shropshire
- Region: West Midlands
- Country: England
- Sovereign state: United Kingdom
- Post town: CHURCH STRETTON
- Postcode district: SY6
- Dialling code: 01694
- Police: West Mercia
- Fire: Shropshire
- Ambulance: West Midlands
- UK Parliament: Ludlow

Hope Bowdler is a small village and civil parish in Shropshire, England.

It is situated on the B4371, 1.5 miles (2.4 km) east of the market town of Church Stretton. The village is at 222 metres (728 ft) above sea level.

There is a parish church in the village, dedicated to St Andrew. The parish is rural and hilly; other settlements within the parish are the hamlets of Ragdon and Chelmick.

== Hope Bowdler Hill ==
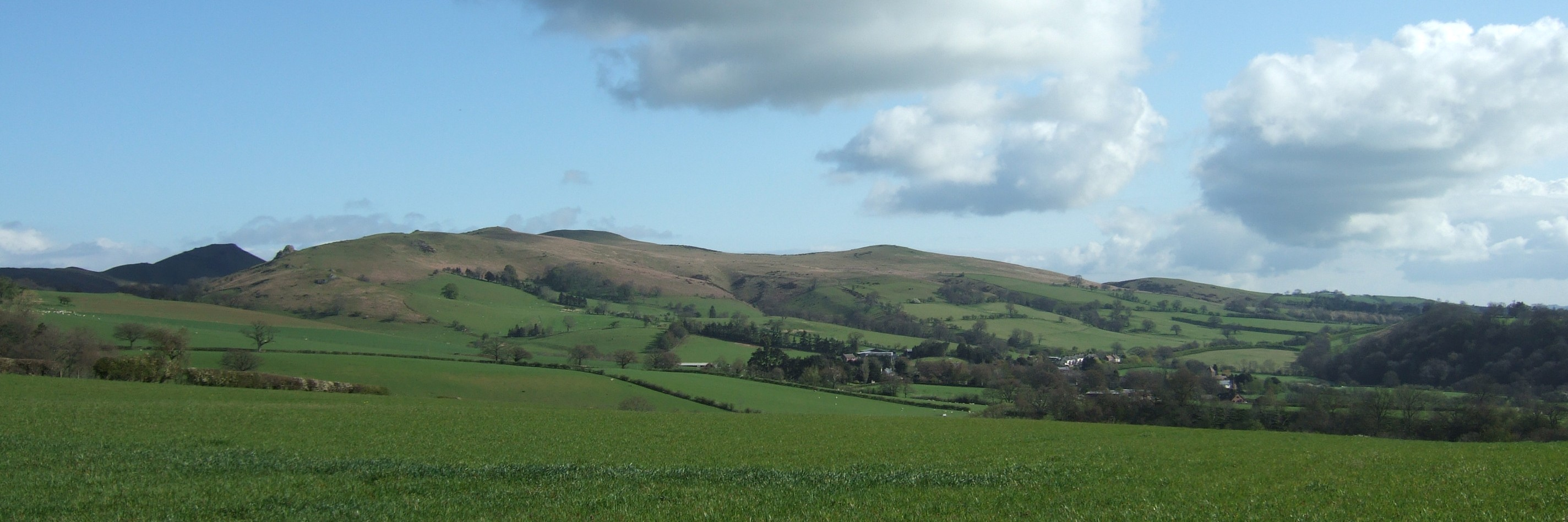
The hill, with Caer Caradoc to the left

Hope Bowdler Hill rises to the north of the village, with a number of summits including Gaer Stone (or Gaerstones), the three tallest of which are 426 metres (1,398 ft), 410m and 393m. It can be reached via a 3.5-mile circular walk from Hope Bowdler, traversing Gaerstone and Wilstone hills, and continuing towards Church Stretton, before returning to the village.

== History ==
The History of Hope Bowdler reaches back to the Roman invasion of Britain in 43AD. On the summit of Caer Caradoc there are remains of a fort where it is alleged that Caractacus made his last stand against the Romans as described by Tacitus. A millennium later another famous rebel, Edric Silvaticus also known as 'Edric the Wild', was a Saxon that fought against the Normans in the area of Hope Bowdler after the Conquest of 1066. Twenty years later Hope Bowdler is mentioned in the Domesday Book of 1086. In the Domesday Book Hope Bowdler is known as Fordritishope. In 1201 the name was changed to Hop and then later in 1273 the name was changed again to Hopebulers. It is now called Hope Bowdler because of its association with the Bowdler family. There are a couple of reasons why Hope Bowdler's name used to be Fordritishope. This name comes from the Saxon era. The manor in the area was called Hope of Forthred. Another reason why it got its name is because Fordritshope means hope or valley.

== St. Andrews Church ==
The parish church has existed in Hope Bowdler since the 12th century. It is believed that it was founded by the Normans The current church was rebuilt in 1862 using materials from the old church and the nearby Soudley quarry. The current incumbent is the Reverend Jill Groves. She is also in charge of three other parish churches in Cardington, Eaton-under-Heywood and Rushbury. The church registers of birth, baptisms and burials begins 1564 and the chalice of 1571 still exists.

=== 1800s ===
In the 1800s changes were made St. Andrew's church. In 1828 Moses George Benson purchased the Manor and became a Patron of the church. The capacity of the church in 1851 was 90 people. On 15 September 1863 the new church was opened to the public, the Wellington Journal reported that,'the site of the new church is the same as that which occupied the old church, which having become dilapidated and unfit for the purpose of public worship was pulled down and re-built on a much larger scale and in a more convenient style.' The oldest windows in the church are from the 1800s. They are situated behind the altar and they have been there since 1852. In 1863 the lychgate was built that leads into the church graveyard. The graveyard is mainly occupied with old tombstones with faded engravings. It is the only lychgate in Shropshire with a coffin stone.

=== The Parish War Dead ===
There is a War memorial at St. Andrew's church. It displays 11 names on it for the soldiers that died in World War I. No memorial exists for the World War II soldiers because all seven of them returned safely.

Outside the church on the north wall is an inlaid stone cross, with metal plaque below, in memory of Thomas Brooke Benson, Royal Scots Fusiliers, who was killed in the Battle of Neuve Chapelle, France, in 1915.

The churchyard contains two Commonwealth war graves, a Lancashire Fusiliers soldier of World War I who died nine days after the Armistice in 1918, and a Royal Air Force officer of World War II.

== Education ==
In Hope Bowdler there are no schools open today. There used to be schools in Hope Bowdler between the period 1819–1948. In 1819 there were three private schools open with a total of 20 pupils. By 1833 all three schools were closed. A National school was opened in 1857 with 40 places available. The students had to pay weekly fees, books and coal. Attendance at the school averaged 30 between 1885 and 1913. Attendance started to drop because of pupils leaving to attend schools in Church Stretton. By managers' request the school was closed in 1948. The closest school is Rushbury Primary school near Church Stretton.

== Population ==
The population in Hope Bowdler rose and fell between the years of 1801 and 1961. This pattern is similar to the rest of Britain but with greater fluctuation. It is more dramatic because the area has a smaller population so if people come and go it will more obvious in recorded statistics. In 1801 Hope Bowdler had a population of 130 and 160 years later the population and only risen to 181. Over time the population had risen higher than the population in 1961. Over those 160 years the highest the population got to was 202 in 1831. The population also decreased over time. It fell to 121 in 1921. This population decrease is because of the 11 soldiers that died in World War 1.

== Industry ==
The 1881 census provided details of Hope Bowdler industry and what was the main type of occupation in the area. There were many different types of occupation that was recorded in the census: agriculture, professionals, food and lodging and domestic services. These are just a few that are in the census. Agriculture employed most of the male population, 35 men were employed compared to only 1 male being employed in a professional career. The number of women that were employed was significantly lower than the male population of the area. Only 12 woman were employed. The occupation that women worked the most in was domestic service. They outnumbered the men 8 to 1.

The children in the area also worked. Even though this was not recorded in the census the children, especially young males worked on the farms. Agriculture was the main occupation so it was common for young boys to become apprentices for farmers.

=== Farming ===
The agriculture industry in Hope Bowdler had many different aspects to it. They farmed livestock and crops. Most of the land was kept as grassland. In 1867 70% of the land was grassland and this rose to 92% in 1938. It did fall in 1965 to 79%. It was mainly grassland because they mainly farmed sheep. Between the period 1867 and 1965 the percentage of cattle that was sheep never fell below 80%. The other cattle that they farmed was pigs. The crops they farmed were barley, oats, mixed corn and rye. Over the same period of time barley was the main crop farmed apart from in 1938 when oats was the main crop, 66% of the crops was oats in that year and barley only accounted for 3%. A very small percentage of the land was used for root vegetables. It never reached above 10% of what they farmed.

== See also ==
- Listed buildings in Hope Bowdler
