= Rushbury =

Village in Shropshire, England

Coordinates: 52.522°N 2.719°W

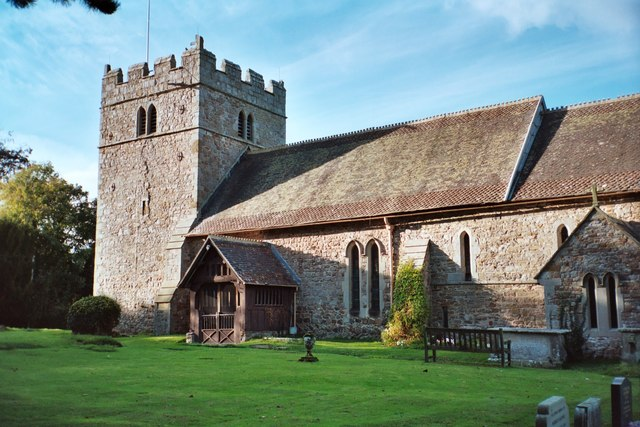
- St Peter's parish church, Rushbury

- Location within Shropshire
- Population: 699 (2011)
- OS grid reference: SO513918
- Civil parish: Rushbury
- Unitary authority: Shropshire
- Ceremonial county: Shropshire
- Region: West Midlands
- Country: England
- Sovereign state: United Kingdom
- Post town: CHURCH STRETTON
- Postcode district: SY6
- Dialling code: 01694
- Police: West Mercia
- Fire: Shropshire
- Ambulance: West Midlands
- UK Parliament: Ludlow

Rushbury is a village and civil parish in Shropshire, roughly five miles from Church Stretton and eight miles from Much Wenlock.

Nearby villages include Cardington, Longville in the Dale, Ticklerton and Wall under Haywood. Longville and Wall lie within Rushbury parish.

Rushbury is a quiet rural community, with a Church of England church and primary school.

== History ==
=== Origins ===
The name Rushbury is thought to derive from Rush Manor, but other evidence suggests that it could originate from the Old English 'risc', literally meaning 'a place where rushes grow', and the Old English word 'burh', meaning a 'fortified place'; putting the two together gives 'Rush Fortification'. Human activity has been present since Neolithic times and there was once an Iron Age hill fort. The area of Rushbury Civil Parish (CP) has changed throughout history. According to the 1831 census it was 5,620 acres, before decreasing to 4,132 acres by the 1851 census and then increasing to 6,304 by 1891, where it has remained ever since. Rushbury CP now includes the settlements of East Wall, Longville in the Dale, Lushcott, Stanway, Stone Acton and Wall under Haywood.

=== Population ===
Throughout history the population has changed; from the start of the census in 1801 the population steadily increased and reached a peak of 507 in 1831, after which it decreased slightly to 495 before increasing again (with the exception of 1921 where it was 530) in 1881 from 500. There was a slight decrease again in 1951.see chart on population of Rushbury. According to the 2001 census the population was 603.

=== Economic history ===
According to the Domesday Book Rushbury had the most arable land compared to the surrounding manors. In 1086 it had: "two ploughteams in demesne worked by 4 servi, while 1 villanus, 2 bordars, and 3 radmen worked five more". Rushbury also had enough woodland in the Middle Ages to fatten 40 swine and about 1250, one pig in ten was given to the lord of Lutwyche. However, by 1301 most of Rushbury had deforested and been made warren land. In 1086 one water mill was recorded at Rushbury and a tanner was supposed to have lived here in 1602. A link showing a pie chart of occupational categories in 1831 here. Over three-quarters of the male population aged over 20 were involved in agriculture see chart. A map showing land utilisation of Rushbury in 1942 can be seen here. The yellow areas represent common land, brown arable land, dark green mixed forest and purple houses with gardens, allotments and orchards.

In 2001 the vast majority of people worked in agriculture (51 people) or in retail trade (39) or education (30). Most people worked away from home travelling by car or van (163) but a high proportion also worked from home (90).

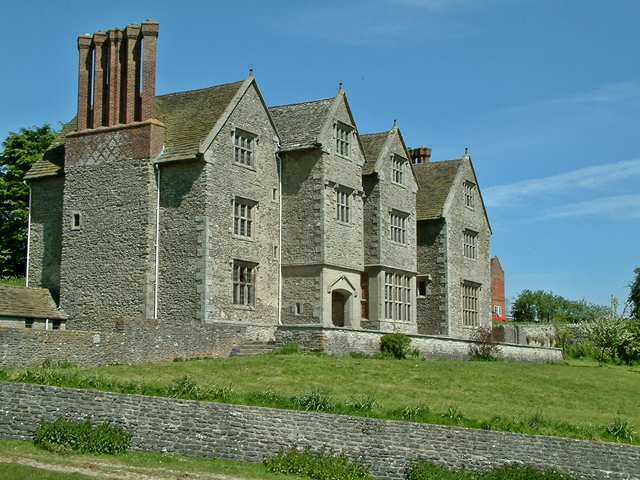
Wilderhope Manor

Wilderhope Manor, a 16th-century country house restored in 1936 and now owned by the National Trust, is used as a Youth Hostel. It is a grade I listed building.

== Church ==
The founding date of the church is unknown, but was most likely built around Saxon times and the name St Peter was known by around 1740. Between 1548 and 1792 the church belonged to the lord of Rushbury manor. A rectory was built around 1260.

It is known that in 1716 there were two Sunday services, one with a sermon and communion six times a year. In the mid 18th century, sacrament offerings (charity money) were given to the poor.

In the 1800s, the rector of Rushbury received £40 a year in half of grain and corn tithes from Gretton, Gilberries, Wall under Haywood and other parts of Rushbury township.

The church was restored in 1855-1856 by William Hill of Smethcott with the costs being met by subscriptions and grants from the Hereford Diocesan Church Building Society. The registers begin in 1538, but there are several gaps in the 16th and 17th centuries.

The church clock, on the west side of the tower, was placed in 1921 in memory of parish men who died serving in World War I, replacing an older clock of 1789. Inside the church is a wall tablet listing these men, and another to the apparent only local man to die in the Second World War, Stanley Thomas Hughes. The churchyard contains a Commonwealth war grave of a Machine Gun Corps soldier of World War I.

Also buried in the churchyard is Robert Hart, pioneer of forest gardening.

The church was made a grade II listed building on 12 November 1954.

== Geography ==
Further information Geography of Shropshire Geology of Shropshire

Rushbury is located in the Shropshire Hills an Area of Outstanding Natural Beauty (ANOB) and sits in a valley, known as Ape Dale, with Wenlock Edge to the southeast. About 7 km (4 miles) to the west is the Long Mynd.

Rushbury lies in Silurian rock a type of limestone much like Wenlock Edge itself. Rushbury lies about 200m above sea level.

Three rivers flow past or near Rushbury: Lakehouse Brook flows right next to the village, while Heath Brook and Coley Brook run near the village and within Rushbury CP itself.

The nearest major settlement is Church Stretton at 5 km (5 miles) and is about 26 km (16 miles) from the county town of Shrewsbury

== Transport ==
=== Road ===
Rushbury Road runs through Rushbury Village itself and connects to the B4371, which in turn connects to the nearest major road A49 that runs through Church Stretton and goes to Shrewsbury in the north.

=== Rail ===
The nearest train station is Church Stretton railway station which has services to Shrewsbury, Ludlow and Hereford. Rushbury previously had a station on a branch line of the Great Western Railway from 1867 to 1951.

=== Bus ===
There is a bus that passes close to Rushbury. The 540 Shrewsbury - Cardington service operates Monday-Friday (excludes bank holidays) during school term time. The bus stop is located by the Village Hall.

=== Walking/cycle ===
There are many established paths and public rights of way, the nearest main public bridle path being Coats Wood which connects to other bridle ways, some of which run almost the entire length of Wenlock Edge. There are also established cycle networks nearby.

== Notable people ==
- Robert Hart (horticulturist) (1913-2000), pioneer of forest gardening, had a smallholding nearby on Wenlock Edge, buried in Rushbury churchyard.
- Sir Neil Cossons (born 1939), industrial archaeologist, lived in Rushbury from 1990s.

== See also ==
- Listed buildings in Rushbury
