= Listed buildings in Eaton-under-Heywood =

Eaton-under-Heywood is a civil parish in Shropshire, England. It contains 17 listed buildings that are recorded in the National Heritage List for England. Of these, one is listed at Grade I, the highest of the three grades, three are at Grade II*, the middle grade, and the others are at Grade II, the lowest grade. The parish contains the villages of Eaton and Ticklerton, and smaller settlements including Birtley and Soudley, and is otherwise rural. Most of the listed buildings are houses and associated structures, farmhouses and farm buildings. The other listed buildings are a church, a sundial and a monument in the churchyard, and a war memorial.

== Key ==
| Grade | Criteria |
|---|---|
| I | Buildings of exceptional interest, sometimes considered to be internationally important |
| II* | Particularly important buildings of more than special interest |
| II | Buildings of national importance and special interest |

== Buildings ==
| Name and location | Photograph | Date | Notes | Grade |
|---|---|---|---|---|
| St Edith's Church; 52.50565°N 2.73823°W | | 12th century | The oldest part of the church is the nave, the tower and chancel date from the 13th century, there were later alterations, and a restoration by W. J. Hopkins in 1869. The church is built in stone and has tile roofs with decorative ridge tiles and a cross finial. It consists of a nave and chancel in one unit, a south porch, and a south tower. The tower has three stages, a south arched doorway, an embattled parapet with a pinnacle on each merlon, and a pyramidal roof. | I |
| Hatton Farmhouse; 52.50798°N 2.78487°W | — | Mid 15th century | The farmhouse, which was extended in the 16th and 18th centuries, is partly timber framed with cruck construction and rendered infill, partly rendered, and partly in stone, with tile roofs. There is a single storey and an attic, and a T-shaped plan consisting of a three-bay hall range, and a cross-wing facing the road. The windows are casements, and in the cross-wing is a dormer. The right gable of the cross-wing is jettied, and in the hall range is a cruck truss. | II* |
| Wolverton Manor; 52.48641°N 2.78158°W | — | Late 15th century | Originally a manor house, it was altered and extended as a farmhouse in the 16th and 17th centuries. The core is timber framed with cruck construction, later rendered, and with a tile roof. It has a T-shaped plan, consisting of a long hall range with one storey and attics, and a gabled cross-wing to the right with two storeys. The windows and doorways date from the 20th century, and include three gabled dormers. | II* |
| New Hall; 52.49781°N 2.75336°W | | 16th century | The house, which has been altered, is timber framed on a stone plinth, partly encased in red brick, and it has a tile roof. There are two storeys, and an H-shaped plan, consisting of a three-bay hall range, and gabled cross-wings. Above the doorway is a canopy, and the windows are casements. Inside the house are wall paintings. | II* |
| Upper Farmhouse; 52.50873°N 2.78398°W | — | Late 16th century | The farmhouse, which was later extended, is in stone with a tile roof. There are two storeys, and originally an L-shaped plan, with a wing added later. The windows are casements, and there is a porch with a lean-to roof. | II |
| Harton Manor; 52.49358°N 2.76389°W | — | 1615 | A farmhouse, later a private house, it was later extended. The original part is timber framed with brick infill on a stone plinth, partly rendered, and with a tile roof. It has one storey and an attic, and an L-shaped plan. The later parallel range is in brick with a slate roof, and has two storeys and an attic. Some windows are casements, and others are mullioned and transomed. | II |
| Harton Farmhouse; 52.49309°N 2.76396°W | — | Early 17th century | The farmhouse was altered in the 19th century. It is partly timber framed with rendered infill, partly in brick and partly in stone, and has a tile roof. There are two storeys and an attic, and a T-shaped plan, consisting of a main range and a cross-wing, and with later lean-to extensions. The windows are 20th-century casements. | II |
| Ticklerton Court; 52.51276°N 2.76202°W | — | Early 17th century | The house was remodelled in the early 19th century and reduced in the 20th century. It is in stone on a plinth, and has a hipped slate roof. There are two storeys, three bays, the central bay recessed, and to the right is a single-story wing. In the centre is a doorway with a semicircular fanlight and an open pediment. This is flanked by bay windows, and all the windows are sashes with moulded keyblocks. | II |
| Barn, Harton Farm; 52.49325°N 2.76413°W | — | 17th century | The barn is timber framed with weatherboarding on a stone plinth and has a corrugated sheet roof. There are three bays, and it contains three doors, windows, and loft openings. | II |
| Hatton Cottage; 52.50772°N 2.78580°W | — | 1679 | A farmhouse, later a workhouse, an inn, and a house, it is in stone on a plinth, with a tile roof. The house has a T-shaped plan, two storeys and an attic. The windows are casements with stepped hood moulds, and above the door is a datestone. | II |
| Ticklerton Hall; 52.51270°N 2.76076°W | — | c.1700 | The core is timber framed, and encased in red brick, with storey bands and hipped slate roofs. There are two storeys and a cellar at the front and three storeys at the rear. The house has an H-shaped plan, with a central recessed block of two bays, a left wing with three bays, and a right wing of two bays. Steps lead up to a central doorway with a fanlight. All the windows date from the 20th century and are either sashes with segmental heads, or casements with flat lintels. In the left return is a panel with dove holes. | II |
| Sundial; 52.50566°N 2.73775°W | — | Early 18th century | The sundial is in the churchyard of St Edith's Church. It consists of a square stone pedestal on three round steps, and has a moulded cap and a brass dial. | II |
| The Old Rectory; 52.50603°N 2.73787°W | — | Early 18th century | The rectory, later a private house, is in brick with stone dressings, quoins, bands, a cornice, and a tile roof with coped parapet gables. There are two storeys, cellars and attics, and a four-bay front with a slate-roofed trellis porch. The windows on the front are sashes, and in the left gable end are mullioned and transomed windows. | II |
| Memorial; 52.50557°N 2.73829°W | — | Mid 18th century | The memorial is in the churchyard of St Edith's Church and is to the memory of two members of the Corfield family. It is an inscribed stone slab tomb with moulded edges, plain panels and corner piers. | II |
| Dovecote, The Old Rectory; 52.50605°N 2.73757°W | — | 18th century | The dovecote consists of a pigeon loft added to the top of a privy and a pigsty. It is in brick on a stone plinth, and has a gabled tile roof. There is a square plan, three storeys, and it contains doorways, a casement window, and pigeon holes. | II |
| Eaton Manor; 52.50565°N 2.73911°W | | Mid to late 18th century | A farmhouse in roughcast brick with quoins, a band, dentil eaves, and a tile roof. It has two storeys and attics, a front range with three bays and rear extensions. The doorway has pilasters and an open pediment. In the ground floor are mullioned and transomed windows, and above are casement windows with segmental heads. | II |
| Ticklerton War Memorial; 52.51342°N 2.76085°W | | 1920 | The war memorial is in Grinshill sandstone, and consists of a tapering obelisk on a pedestal on a stepped plinth. On the front of the pedestal is an inscription, and on the sides are bronze plaques with the names of those lost n the First World War. | II |
