= Listed buildings in Culmington =

Culmington is a civil parish in Shropshire, England. It contains 15 listed buildings that are recorded in the National Heritage List for England. Of these, one is at Grade II*, the middle of the three grades, and the others are at Grade II, the lowest grade. The parish contains the village of Culmington and smaller settlements, and is otherwise rural. The listed buildings include houses and cottages, farmhouses, and farm buildings, the earliest of which are timber framed, a church and a headstone in the churchyard, a school, and two follies, one of which has been converted for residential use.

== Key ==
Grade	Criteria
II*	Particularly important buildings of more than special interest
II	Buildings of national importance and special interest

== Buildings ==
Name and location	Photograph	Date	Notes	Grade
All Saints Church; 52.43331°N 2.74616°W		c. 1100	The church was altered in the 13th and 14th centuries. It is in sandstone with a tile roof, and consists of a nave and a chancel in one cell, and a west tower. The tower has a conical broach spire with openwork aluminium superstructure. The nave is Norman is style, and the chancel is Early English.	II*
Burley Farmhouse; 52.42867°N 2.76733°W	—	17th century	The farmhouse was extended in the 19th century. It is partly timber framed with plaster infill, partly in sandstone, and has a tile roof. There are two storeys and an attic, an L-shaped plan, and casement windows.	II
Barn north of Culmington Farmhouse; 52.43402°N 2.74717°W		17th century	The barn has two ranges at right angles, forming an L-shaped plan. It is partly timber framed with brick infill, partly in brick, and partly weatherboarded, with a tile roof, and a gable to the west. It contains various openings including wagon doorways, windows, and vents, and there is a gabled roof dormer.	II
Barn northeast of Seifton Manor; 52.44246°N 2.76069°W	—	17th century	The barn is partly timber framed with brick nogging and weatherboarding, and partly in sandstone, on a stone plinth, and with a tile roof. There are eight bays, a single storey with lofts, wagon entrances, plank doors, ventilation holes, and external steps leading to a granary.	II
Tudor Lodge; 52.43459°N 2.74786°W	—	17th century	A house, partly timber framed with plaster infill on a stone plinth, partly in stone, and with a tile roof, it has one storey with attics, and an L-shaped plan. The windows are casements, and there is a dormer in the gable.	II
Barn east of Burley Farmhouse; 52.42884°N 2.76693°W	—	Late 17th or early 18th century	The barn is timber framed with weatherboarding on a sandstone plinth, and has a tile roof. It has eight bays, and contains two wagon doorways.	II
Prince Phillimore School; 52.43366°N 2.74806°W		Early 18th century	A house, later a school, in red brick on a stone plinth with a hipped tile front. It has two storeys, attics and a cellar, five bays. There is a central gabled porch, cross-windows with segmental heads, and three raking dormers.	II
Seifton Court; 52.44275°N 2.76114°W	—	18th century	A sandstone house with a tile roof, two storeys, three bays, and a rear wing. On the front is a gabled porch, the windows are casements, there is a gabled roof dormer, and in the right return the gable is timber framed.	II
Seifton House; 52.44380°N 2.75885°W	—	Mid 18th century	A house in brick and sandstone with a tile roof. The main block is in brick and has two storeys, five bays, a band, and sash windows. The central doorway has pilasters, entablature blocks, and a modillioned open pediment hood. To the left is a sandstone wing with jettying, a French windows and a fanlight. In the right return the windows are casements, and a further stone wing has an oriel window. At the rear is a single-storey wing with an attic that has gables with modillioned bargeboards and pendant finials, stable doors and carriage doors.	II
The Old Cottage; 52.42619°N 2.77439°W	—	Late 18th or early 19th century	The cottage is in stone with a thatched roof covered in corrugated iron There are two storeys, and outshuts to the left and at the rear. In the centre is a doorway, and the windows are small casements. Attached to the right is a weatherboarded single-storey stable.	II
Flounders' Folly; 52.46061°N 2.79533°W		1838	The folly was erected by the industrialist Benjamin Flounders. It is in sandstone and in the form of a square tower about 24 metres (79 ft) high. The tower has an embattled parapet with one merlon on each side, a chamfered pointed arch on the southeast front, and an inscribed tablet.	II
Culmington Farmhouse; 52.43365°N 2.74714°W		Mid 19th century	The farmhouse is in limestone with a brick dentil eaves band, and a tile roof. There are three storeys, three bays, and a long rear wing with a single storey and attics. The central doorway has an oak frame and an ogee-headed fanlight. The windows are sashes, those in the central bay with ogee heads, and the others with segmental heads. In the rear wing are four gables and casement windows.	II
Langley Villa; 52.42220°N 2.75204°W		Mid 19th century	A cottage orné in sandstone, partly rendered, with a tile roof. It has two storeys and an L-shaped plan, with four bays, the second bay gabled, and a projecting gabled wing on the right. The windows are casements with ogee heads, and the gables have scalloped bargeboards.	II
The Tower House; 52.43156°N 2.77624°W		19th century	A folly converted for residential use, it is in sandstone with an irregular plan, consisting of two towers, a wing, and a lean-to. One tower has three storeys, the other has two, and both have corbel tables and embattled parapets. The windows are casements, some with hood moulds.	II
Headstone; 52.43316°N 2.74580°W	—	c. 1881	The headstone is in the churchyard of All Saints Church, and is to the memory of Robert Williams, rector of the parish and author. It is in Welsh slate, and the inscription is in Welsh.	II
