= Listed buildings in Cardington, Shropshire =

Cardington is a civil parish in Shropshire, England. It contains 48 listed buildings recorded in the National Heritage List for England. Of these, two are listed at Grade I, the highest of the three grades, three are at Grade II*, the middle grade, and the others are at Grade II, the lowest grade. The parish contains the village of Cardington and smaller settlements including Broome and Gretton, and is otherwise almost entirely rural. Most listed buildings are houses, cottages, farmhouses and farm buildings, many of them timber framed and dating from the 14th to the 18th century. The other listed buildings are a church retaining some Norman features, items in the churchyard, a country house and associated structures, a public house, a former school, a former watermill and two pumps.

== Key ==
Grade	Criteria
I	Buildings of exceptional interest, sometimes considered to be internationally important
II*	Particularly important buildings of more than special interest
II	Buildings of national importance and special interest

== Buildings ==
Name and location	Photograph	Date	Notes	Grade
St James' Church; 52.55193°N 2.72946°W		12th century	The nave is Norman, the chancel was rebuilt in the late 13th century, the porch was added in 1639, and the church was restored between 1863 and 1869. It is built in sandstone, and the tower is rendered. The church consists of a nave and chancel in one cell, a south porch, and a west tower. The tower has three stages, the lower two stages are in Early English style, and the top stage is in Perpendicular style, and has an embattled parapet and a pyramidal roof with a weathervane.	I
The Barracks; 52.55253°N 2.72994°W	—	14th century	A house that was repeatedly altered and extended. The earliest part is timber framed with plaster infill, it has been partly rebuilt and extended in sandstone, and has a tile roof. The original part has 2½ bays and two storeys, and there is a 16th-century cross-wing with two bays, one storey and an attic. The 18th-century extension to the right is in stone, and the windows are casements.	II
Shootrough Farmhouse; 52.56281°N 2.75322°W	—	Late 14th century	The farmhouse was extended in the 16th century and altered in the 18th and 19th centuries. It is timber framed with plaster infill, and partly of cruck construction. The farmhouse has been encased and rebuilt in sandstone and red brick, and it has a tile roof. There is one storey and attics, and a T-shaped plan, consisting of an original hall range and a later cross-wing. The windows are casements, and there are gabled eaves dormers. Inside the hall range are three full cruck trusses.	II
Plaish Hall; 52.56400°N 2.69449°W		c. 1540	A country house incorporating part of a 15th-century house, and later extended and altered. It is in red brick with blue diapering on a chamfered plinth, and has sandstone dressings, quoins, and a stone-slate roof with parapeted gables and stone copings. The house has an H-shaped plan, with a central hall, and gabled cross-ranges, two storeys, attics and a basement. Above the doorway is a balcony with scrolled brackets and a wrought iron balustrade. The windows vary, and include casements, some mullioned and transomed windows, and flat-roofed dormers.	I
Comley Cottage; 52.56333°N 2.76059°W	—	16th century (probable)	The cottage has a cruck construction, it is timber framed with plaster infill, there is some applied timber framing, and the roof is tiled. On the left are brick additions. The cottage has one storey and an attic, and probably two bays, and the windows are casements.	II
Barn northeast of The Malt House; 52.55271°N 2.71828°W	—	16th century (probable)	The barn is of cruck construction, it is timber framed and weatherboarded and clad in corrugated iron, and has a corrugated iron roof. There are three bays, a lean-to extension on the right, and inside are three full cruck trusses.	II
Court House; 52.54864°N 2.71237°W	—	Mid to late 16th century	The farmhouse was largely rebuilt and extended in the 18th century. It is in sandstone with gritstone dressings, a timber framed right gable end with weatherboarding and corrugated iron cladding, and a tile roof. It has one storey and attics, and three bays. The windows are casements, and there are three gabled eaves dormers.	II
Chapel House; 52.55371°N 2.72990°W	—	Late 16th century (probable)	A farmhouse, later a private house, it has a timber framed core, and was extended in the 18th, 19th and 20th centuries. The exterior is in sandstone, partly rendered, and it has a tile roof. There are two storeys, and the house consists of a hall range, a cross-wing, a 19th-century wing at the rear, and a 20th-century extension to the right, and there is a barn with a projecting two-bay gabled cross-wing to the left. The windows are casements, and there is a gabled eaves dormer.	II
Garden walls, Plaish Hall; 52.56380°N 2.69428°W	—	Late 16th century (probable)	The garden walls are in sandstone and have a red brick top with vitrified blue diapering, and stone coping. They form an U-shaped plan around a courtyard, and are about 70 metres (230 ft) long. They contain two moulded stone Tudor archways, one containing a wrought iron gate.	II
The Maltsters Tap; 52.55141°N 2.72979°W	—	c. 1600	A farmhouse, later a private house, it was altered and extended in the 18th and 19th centuries. The house is timber framed with plaster infill, partly rebuilt and extended in sandstone, and partly pebbledashed, it has quoins, red brick window heads, and tile roofs. There are two storeys, the original part forms a cross-wing, with the 18th century range to the right, and later additions at the rear. The windows are casements, most with segmental heads, and there is a gabled porch. Inside is a timber framed cross-wall.	II
Barn and part of former house near The Maltsters Tap; 52.55132°N 2.72960°W	—	c. 1600	One bay of the former house survives, and this is attached to the right of a three-bay barn dating from the 17th century. The building is timber framed and weatherboarded on a sandstone plinth, part of the front of the house has been rebuilt in sandstone, and the building has a tile roof. On the front are two doors, two loft doors, and a small window. In the right return, formerly an internal wall, is a fireplace.	II
Barn, Lower Day House; 52.56767°N 2.66582°W	—	Early 17th century	The barn is timber framed on a sandstone plinth, with some brick nogging and some plaster infill, and it is partly weatherboarding. The barn has a tile roof and three bays, and contains various openings.	II
Manor Farmhouse and barns 52.55306°N 2.72975°W	—	Early 17th century	The farmhouse was rebuilt and a cross-wing added to the left later in the 17th century. It is in sandstone, partly rebuilt in brick, and has a tile roof. The cross-wing has a chamfered plinth, the windows in both parts are replacement casements. The windows in the original part and the doorway have keyed lintels, and in the original part are gabled dormers. To the right are barns with an L-shaped plan. They are timber framed and weatherboarded on a sandstone plinth.	II
Farm buildings, pump and trough, Plaish Park Farm; 52.56249°N 2.69459°W	—	Early 17th century	The farm buildings were later altered and extended, and consist of a cow house, a cartshed and a granary. They are timber framed with brick nogging, partly rebuilt in sandstone, and have tiled roofs. There are four bays, extensions at both ends, and external steps leading up to the granary door. The pump is in cast iron and has a circular shaft with splayed spout, a fluted top with a curved handle, and a ribbed domed cap with large finial. The trough is rectangular and in grey sandstone.	II
Barn south of Shootrough Farmhouse; 52.56252°N 2.75319°W	—	Early to mid 17th century	The barn was extended in about 1700 and in the 19th century. It is timber framed and weatherboarded on a sandstone plinth, the south wall is rebuilt in sandstone with brick dressings, and the barn has a tile roof. There are two bays and the later extension, and four external stone steps. The barn contains a segmental-headed door and a loft door.	II
Broome Hall Farmhouse; 52.57892°N 2.70118°W	—	17th century	The farmhouse is timber framed and rendered, it has been largely extended and rebuilt in sandstone, and has tile roofs. There is one storey, an attic and a semi-basement, and a T-shaped plan. Most of the windows are casements, there is a sash window and a gabled eaves dormer.	II
Chatwall Hall; 52.57352°N 2.71826°W		17th century	A farmhouse that was altered in about 1700, and extended in about 1899. It is in sandstone on a chamfered plinth, and has a tile roof. There are two storeys and attics, and at the front are three gables, the left projecting. In front of the right gable is a large pebbledashed chimney stack. The windows are mullioned, one with a pulvinated frieze and a moulded cornice. The doorway has a moulded surround, a Tudor arched head, and a pulvinated frieze.	II*
Holt Farmhouse; 52.56457°N 2.68752°W		Mid 17th century	The farmhouse is in gritstone on a plinth, with a tile roof. It has an E-shaped plan, with a main range, projecting gabled wings, and a full-height gabled porch, and there is a later lean-to on the left. There are two storeys and an attic, and most windows are mullioned. Inside are timber framed cross-walls.	II*
Barn north of Lower Farmhouse; 52.56295°N 2.73702°W	—	Mid 17th century	The barn is timber framed and weatherboarded, and clad in corrugated iron on a sandstone plinth. There is a sandstone north wall and an extension in red sandstone to the south. The roof is tiled, there are three bays and extensions at the ends. The barn contains double doors and various other openings.	II
Barn adjoining Rose Cottage; 52.55268°N 2.73000°W	—	17th century	The barn is timber framed and weatherboarded on a stone plinth, it has an extension in yellow sandstone, and a corrugated iron roof. There are four bays, and it contains single and double doors, and windows, one of which is a casement.	II
The Royal Oak Public House; 52.55201°N 2.72882°W		Mid 17th century	Originally a house, later a public house, it was extended in the late 19th and early 20th centuries. It is timber framed with brick nogging, partly rendered, partly rebuilt in brick, and has tile roofs. The public house has one storey and attics, the windows are casements, and there are two gabled dormers. To the right and incorporated into the public house are a former two-storey coach house and stable.	II
Bowman Hill Farmhouse; 52.56952°N 2.69429°W	—	Mid to late 17th century	The farmhouse was altered in the 19th century. It is in sandstone, partly rebuilt in red brick, and has a tile roof. There is an L-shaped plan, two storeys, attics and a basement, and two bays on the garden front. To the left is a stone lean-to with external steps, a round archway, and a parapet. The windows are sashes, and there is a gabled eaves dormer.	II
Court Farmhouse; 52.55181°N 2.71649°W	—	Late 17th century	The oldest part is the rear wing, the main range dating from the late 18th century. The farmhouse is in sandstone with a tile roof, and has an L-shaped plan. The main range has two storeys and three bays. There is a gabled timber porch, a doorway with a rectangular fanlight, and casement windows. The rear wing has one storey and an attic, and its windows are mullioned.	II
Lower Farmhouse, Enchmarsh; 52.56276°N 2.73687°W	—	1677	The farmhouse, later a private house, was altered in about 1810, and later extended. It is in sandstone, partly on a chamfered plinth, and has a machine tile roof. There is an irregular U-shaped plan, two storeys and an attic, and a front of two bays. The windows are casements, there is an inverted heart-shaped datestone, and inside is a timber framed cross-wall.	II
Grove Farmhouse; 52.55125°N 2.73121°W	—	1683	The farmhouse was later extended. It is in yellow sandstone with a tile roof and a T-shaped plan, consisting of a two-bay range and a two-bay gabled cross-wing. There are two storeys with an attic, and the windows are replacement casements.	II
Home Farmhouse; 52.57274°N 2.72000°W	—	c. 1700	A farmhouse, later a private house, it has an earlier timber framed core. The exterior is in sandstone on a chamfered plinth, incorporating some timber framing with plaster infill, and the house has a tile roof. There are two storeys, and a U-shaped plan with additions. The windows are mullioned, there are recessed blind oval panels in the gables, and the doorway has a moulded surround, a pulvinated frieze, and a triangular pediment. Attached to a wing is a mounting block, and inside the house are timber framed cross-walls.	II*
Former Free School; 52.55169°N 2.72924°W		1722–23	The school, now part of a house, is in red brick on a gritstone chamfered plinth, with grey sandstone dressings, a band, and a tile roof with stone copings and parapeted gables. There are two storeys and three bays. Some windows are casements, and others are cross-windows.	II
Outbuilding northwest of Lower Farmhouse; 52.55357°N 2.75223°W	—	Early 18th century (probable)	The outbuilding is in sandstone incorporating some timber framing with plaster infill, and it has a tile roof. There are two storeys and a lean-to on the right. External steps lead up to a loft door.	II
Shoreham; 52.55156°N 2.72908°W		Early 18th century	A pair of cottages, the later one dated 1810, combined into one dwelling. They are in rendered sandstone, and have tiled roofs. The left part has one storey and attics, two gabled dormers, and a large external chimney stack to the left. The right part has two storeys and bracketed eaves, and both parts have casement windows.	II
Lower Farmhouse, Willstone; 52.55340°N 2.75224°W	—	1738	The farmhouse is in sandstone on a plinth, and has a tile roof with parapeted and coped gables. There are two storeys and a basement, a front of five bays, a single-storey recessed wing on the right, and gabled wings at the rear. Steps lead up to a central doorway, above which is an elaborate datestone. The windows are sashes, with moulded sills, and lintels with fluted keystones.	II
7 Grettton; 52.55213°N 2.71765°W		18th century	A cottage that contains 17th-century material, it is timber framed but largely rebuilt in grey sandstone, and it has a tile roof. The cottage has a single-room plan, one storey and an attic, and a lean-to extension on the right. The windows are casements.	II
Farm buildings, Bowman Hill Farm; 52.56961°N 2.69413°W	—	18th century	These consist of a barn and cowhouses, built in grey sandstone and in red and brown brick. They have a tile roof, they contain doorways of various types, and there are external steps leading up to a first floor doorway.	II
Group of five chest tombs 52.55180°N 2.72938°W	—	Mid 18th century	The chest tombs are in the churchyard of St James' Church to the south of the church. They are in brown sandstone, they have differing designs, and are to the memory of people dying between the later part of the 18th century and 1844.	II
Barn east of Lower Farmhouse; 52.55290°N 2.75114°W	—	18th century	A timber framed barn on a sandstone plinth with a sandstone south gable end wall. There are three bays.	II
Granary and pigsties northwest of Manor Farmhouse; 52.55310°N 2.73000°W	—	18th century (probable)	The granary and pigsties are in sandstone with a tile roof. They have one storey and a loft, and contain a ground-floor door and a loft door. In the left return is a raking eaves dormer. To the southwest are two pig pens with chamfered copings.	II
The Fold; 52.55152°N 2.72928°W		Mid 18th century	A farmhouse, later a private house, it was altered and extended in the 19th century. The house is in sandstone on a plinth, and has a band, applied timber framing with pebbledashed infill below the eaves, and a tile roof. There is an L-shaped plan, two storeys with an attic, a two-storey rear wing, and a lean-to in the angle. On the front is a gabled porch, the windows are casements, and in the centre is a gabled half-dormer with a finial.	II
Cow houses, Shootrough Farm; 52.56280°N 2.75322°W	—	18th century	The cow houses are timber framed and weatherboarded on a sandstone plinth, they have been extended in sandstone, and have a tile roof. The buildings have one storey, and contain doorways and louvred windows.	II
Sundial; 52.55182°N 2.72951°W	—	Mid 18th century	The sundial is in the churchyard of St James' Church. It is in sandstone, and has two circular stone steps, and a bulbous baluster with a square base and a moulded cap. On the top is a circular inscribed copper dial and a gnomon.	II
Cow house near The Maltsters Tap; 52.55129°N 2.72940°W	—	18th century	The cow house is in sandstone with an addition in weatherboarded timber framing, and has a corrugated iron roof. There is one storey and a loft, three doors, and two raking eaves dormers.	II
Upper Farmhouse; 52.55280°N 2.71689°W	—	18th century	The farmhouse is in sandstone on a plinth, and has a tile roof with coped and parapeted gables. It has an L-shaped plan, two storeys and an attic, and five bays. The central doorway has a three-part fanlight and a lean-to porch. The windows are cross casements with segmental heads and voussoirs.	II
Old Vicarage and Stable Cottage; 52.55237°N 2.73182°W	—	c. 1814–15	Originally a vicarage and adjoining coach house and stable, later a private house and a cottage, it is in grey sandstone with a hipped slate roof, and two storeys. The garden front has five bays, the central three bays projecting under a triangular pedimented gable. In the middle is a doorway with fluted pilaster strips and a flat hood, and the windows are sashes. In the right return is a doorway with pilasters and an open triangular pediment. To the northeast is the former coach house and stable; these have segmental-headed doorways, loft openings, and two gabled dormers.	II
Ivydene; 52.57437°N 2.77074°W		c. 1820	A brick house, partly rendered with a tile roof. It has an L-shaped plan, two storeys, a central segmental-headed doorway and Gothick-style casement windows with intersecting tracery, four in the upper floor and two larger ones in the ground floor.	II
Butler memorial 52.55183°N 2.72951°W	—	1831	The memorial is in the churchyard of St James' Church, and is to the memory of Richard Butler. It is a pedestal tomb in brown sandstone, and has a chamfered plinth, ribbed corner piers, side panels with quadrant corners, triangular-pedimented gables to each face, and an urn finial.	II
Gretton Mill; 52.54656°N 2.72052°W	—	Early to mid 19th century	Originally a watermill and a mill house on a sloping site, later a farmhouse. It is in yellow sandstone with dressings in red brick and a tile roof. The house has two storeys, a segmental-headed doorway and casement windows. The former mill is to the right; it has a right lean-to, another lean-to at the rear, and a wheel pit.	II
Former stable, Gretton Mill; 52.54655°N 2.72037°W	—	Early to mid 19th century	The former stable is in grey sandstone with a tile roof, and one storey. It contains a boarded door and a segmental-headed window.	II
9 Cardington; 52.55173°N 2.72913°W	—	Mid 19th century	Originally a schoolmaster's house, it is in brown sandstone on a chamfered plinth, and has a tile roof. There are two storeys, two bays, and a single-storey outbuilding on the right. Steps lead up to a central doorway that has an architrave and an open triangular-pedimented hood on tall shaped brackets. The windows are small-paned casements.	II
Pump and basin, Home Farmhouse; 52.56281°N 2.73710°W	—	Mid to late 19th century	The pump is in cast iron, and has a circular shaft with moulded rings, a fluted top with a splayed spout and a double-curved handle, and a fluted domed cap with a knob finial. The basin is in grey sandstone and has a rounded end.	II
Pump, The Royal Oak Public House; 52.55197°N 2.72884°W	—	Late 19th century	The pump is in cast iron, and has a circular shaft with moulded rings and spout, a fluted top with a double-curved handle and a domed cap. There are two makers' plates.	II
