= Benjamin Flounders =

Benjamin Flounders (17 June 1768 – 19 April 1846) was a prominent English Quaker with business interests in new industries and developments at the time of the mid-Industrial Revolution. These included the Stockton and Darlington Railway, of which he was a founding Director, and canals in his native North-East England. He operated his own family businesses successfully, with large interests in timber for shipbuilding during the Napoleonic Wars. He also owned two linen mills and large estates in Egham, Surrey and Glasgow.

== Early life ==
Flounders was born at Crathorne in 1768, and educated at Ackworth School, Leeds.

== Family ==
Flounders lost in 1801 his first wife Mary Walker, daughter of a Quaker shipbuilder, in childbirth with a premature baby. They had married two years previously. A daughter Mary born earlier in the marriage survived to adulthood. The same year, 1801. his sister died. In 1812 Flounders married, secondly, Hannah Chapman, another Quaker. In 1813 a son was born, but both mother and infant son died of tuberculosis later that year.

== New endeavours ==
Flounders became a JP for Shropshire. In 1813 he was one of three gentlemen nominated for appointment as High Sheriff of Shropshire but he declined on the grounds he lived permanently in Yarm and would therefore be living up to 180 miles away from Shrewsbury where the courts would be held. He appealed against similar nominations for similar reasons in 1814, 1820 and 1836. He also became JP for the counties of Durham and the North Riding of Yorkshire and, on 29 December 1817 he received a Church of England baptism at the parish church at Stainton, County Durham. He then became a Trustee of a new turnpike toll road, invested £10,000 in French water stocks, with further investment subsequently, and was successful in financial terms. After the death of his mother in 1829 he embarked on a Grand Tour in Europe with his daughter Mary, now 29, spending some time in Rome.

== Flounders' Folly ==
His best-known achievement is the eponymous Flounders' Folly in South Shropshire near Craven Arms and prominent on the skyline on Callow Hill, the highest point of Wenlock Edge. It commands extensive views over the surrounding Stretton Hills, Wenlock Edge, the Long Mynd and Clee Hills and even further afield to the Brecon Beacons, Radnor Hills, Malvern Hills and Black Mountains.

Flounders had inherited the Culmington estate just north of Ludlow, Shropshire, from his uncle Gideon Bickerdike who died in 1810. His neighbours there included of Robert Clive, the Earl of Craven and Sir Thomas Dyer, 7th Baronet. On his return from his travels Flounders started plans to build the folly. His agent was instructed to purchase the land on which the folly was to be erected. In 1836 construction began and the folly was finished in 1840.

== Mary's marriage and death ==
Around 1840 Flounders' daughter Mary was engaged to marry a Major Arthur Lowe in London, though he did not wholeheartedly approve. The couple were married but Mary died in 1844. Flounders and Lowe then fell out, over Mary's burial in the parish churchyard at Yarm. Flounders largely disinherited Lowe, to whom he left only an annuity. Benjamin wanted to be buried next to his daughter when he died, but Lowe, having fallen out with Benjamin deliberately bought a burial plot, next to the church-yard wall, deliberately, so it was impossible for the 2 to be buried together, However, not to be outdone, Benjamin bought the whole field behind the church wall, knocked down the wall and ensured no-one else could use the land meaning that Benjamin could be buried next to his beloved wife,

== Last years, death and legacy ==
From 1844–45 Flounders set his affairs in order. He died in 1846, aged 77. Quaker-founded schools in the North-East were major beneficiaries of his will, in which over 20 schools were mentioned including Barnard Castle School and Ackworth School. Following the death of the last annuitant from his estate in 1884, Yarm was provided with new premises for its Grammar School. The Flounders Institute at Ackworth was set up in 1848 as a Quaker male teacher training college, with support also from Joseph Rowntree.
