= Gretton, Shropshire =

Coordinates: 52.552°N 2.718°W

Gretton
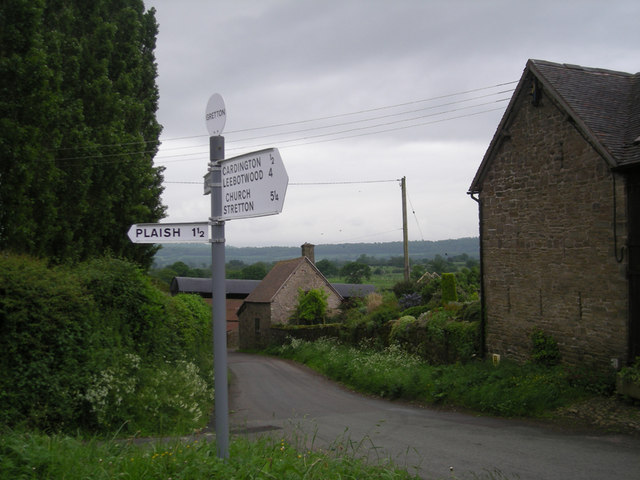
- Gretton

- Location within Shropshire
- OS grid reference: SO514952
- Civil parish: Cardington
- Unitary authority: Shropshire
- Ceremonial county: Shropshire
- Region: West Midlands
- Country: England
- Sovereign state: United Kingdom
- Post town: CHURCH STRETTON
- Postcode district: SY6
- Dialling code: 01694
- Police: West Mercia
- Fire: Shropshire
- Ambulance: West Midlands
- UK Parliament: Shrewsbury and Atcham

Gretton is a hamlet in the civil parish of Cardington, in the Shropshire district, in the ceremonial county of Shropshire. It lies immediately to the east of Cardington village. In 1870-72 the township had a population of 73.

== See also ==
- Listed buildings in Cardington, Shropshire
