= St Edith's Church, Eaton-under-Heywood =

Coordinates: 52.5057°N 2.7383°W

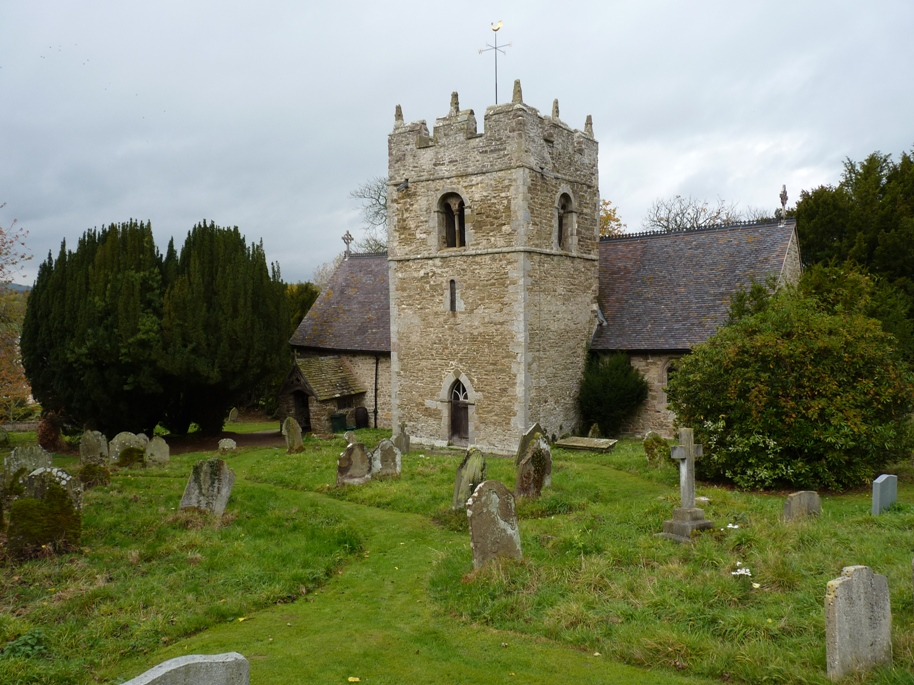
- St Edith's Church, Eaton-under-Heywood, from the southeast

- Location in Shropshire
- OS grid reference: SO 500 900
- Location: Eaton-under-Heywood, Shropshire
- Country: England
- Denomination: Anglican
- Website: St Edith, Eaton-under-Heywood

History
- Status: Parish church
- Dedication: Saint Edith

Architecture
- Functional status: Active
- Heritage designation: Grade I
- Designated: 12 November 1954
- Architect: W. J. Hopkins (restoration)
- Architectural type: Church
- Style: Norman, Gothic

Specifications
- Materials: Stone, tiled roofs

Administration
- Province: Canterbury
- Diocese: Hereford
- Archdeaconry: Ludlow
- Deanery: Condover
- Parish: Eaton under Heywood

Clergy
- Rector: Vacant

St Edith's Church is in the village of Eaton-under-Heywood, Shropshire, England. It stands on the lower slopes of Wenlock Edge. The church, dedicated to Saint Edith of Wilton, is an active Anglican parish church in the deanery of Condover, the archdeaconry of Ludlow, and the diocese of Hereford. Its benefice is united with that of St Andrew, Hope Bowdler. The church is recorded in the National Heritage List for England as a designated Grade I listed building.

== History ==
The nave dates from the 12th century, and the tower and chancel from the early part of the following century. Alterations were made in the 14th and 15th centuries. In 1869 the church was restored by W. J. Hopkins.

== Architecture ==
=== Exterior ===
The church is constructed in stone rubble with ashlar dressings. The roof is tiled, with decorative ridge tiles and a cross finial. The plan consists of a nave and chancel in one unit, a south porch, and a tower that stands at the midpoint of the south side. The church stands on a slope, and the floor of the nave rises from west to east. The tower is in three stages, and stands on a plinth. It has an arched doorway on the south side, above it in the middle stage is a round-headed lancet window, and in the top stage are two-light bell openings under round arches. At the top of the tower is a battlemented parapet, each of the eight merlons being surmounted by a pinnacle, and a pyramidal roof. There are Norman windows, two in the north wall and one in the south. The other windows consist of a flat-headed four-light window and a window with a pointed arch in the north wall, and a two-light window in the south wall. The east window consists of three lancets added in the restoration, and in the west wall is a Tudor-arched window with a cinquefoil roundel above. The south porch has stone side walls, each containing a three-light window, and a timber-framed gable.

=== Interior ===
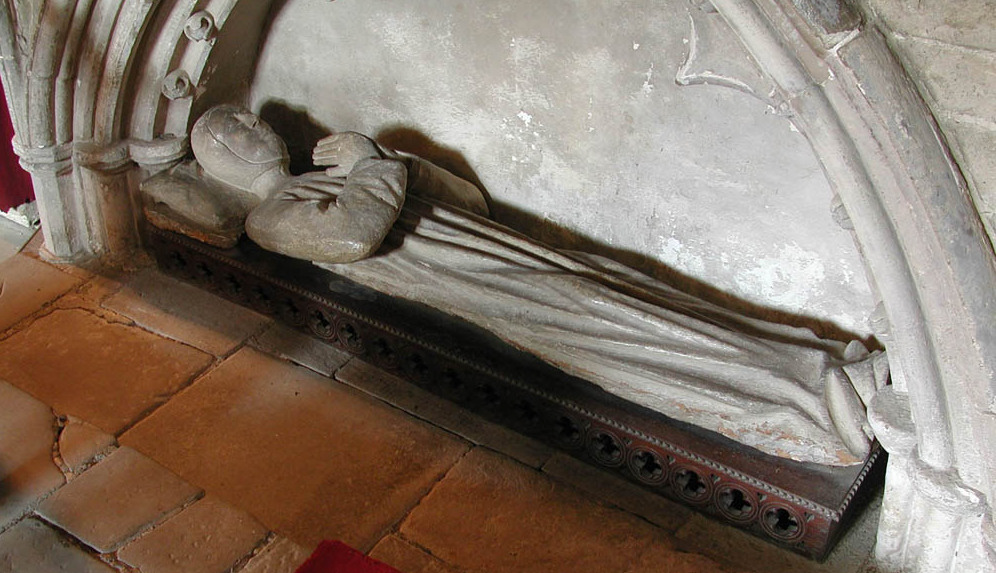
St Edith's effigy

The nave roof dates from the 15th century, and the chancel roof from about 1600. The latter is lower, almost flat, and more ornate than that of the nave. It contains large bosses carved with foliage and grotesques. On the tympanum between the chancel and nave roof are painted coats of arms. The font is Norman and tub-shaped, with a cover dated 1872. The pulpit is carved with tracery and has a backplate dated 1670.

The stained glass in the east window, dated 1869, is by Frederick Preedy, and depicts subjects relating to Saint Edith. In the nave are windows by Done and Davies dated 1859 and 1869. On the north side of the chancel is a four-light window, unveiled 1938, in memory of Alan Bertram Hanbury-Sparrow and his son Brian (killed in World War I), featuring figures of St George and St Francis and his son's regimental badge and Military Cross decoration, by A. K. Nicholson workshops.

On the south wall is a plaque erected by the Revd C.G.N. Friedrichs in memory of his mother and his brother, Captain Duncan Alexander Friedrichs (killed in Dervish War in 1901). In the north chancel wall is a tomb recess under a canopy decorated with ballflowers. It contains the effigy of a civilian dating from the early 14th century. There is a ring of three bells. The two oldest were cast in 1615 and 1622 by William Clibury, and the third by Mears and Stainbank of the Whitechapel Bell Foundry in 1869.

== External features ==
In the churchyard are two structures listed at Grade II. To the south of the church is a slab tomb dating from the middle of the 18th century. To the east of the church is a sundial. This dates from the early 18th century and has a brass dial dated 1721. This lies on a moulded stone cap, which is carried on a square pedestal on three round steps. The churchyard also contains the war grave of a Royal Artillery soldier of World War II.

== See also ==
- Grade I listed churches in Shropshire
