= Jack Mytton Way =

Long-distance trail in Shropshire, England

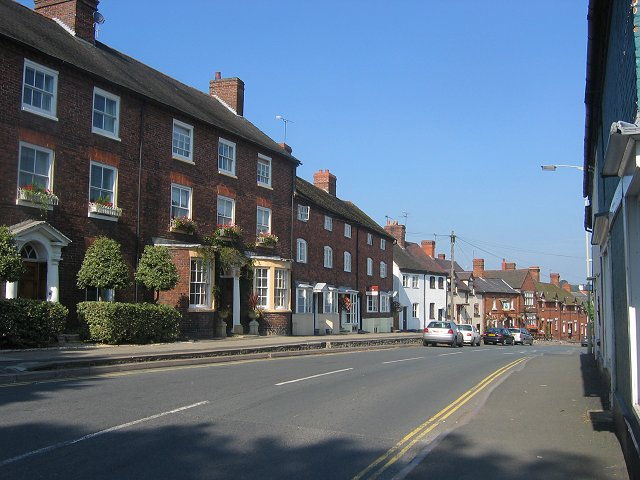
- The trail runs through Cleobury Mortimer
- Length: 93 miles (150 km)
- Location: Shropshire, England
- Trailheads: Bridgnorth; 52.535°N 2.424°W; Much Wenlock; 52.595°N 2.561°W
- Use: Hiking, Horse riding, cycling
- Season: All year

The Jack Mytton Way is a long distance footpath and bridleway for horseriders, hillwalkers and mountain bikers in mid and south Shropshire, England. It typically takes a week to ride on horseback.

For much of its length it passes through the Shropshire Hills AONB and includes parts of Wenlock Edge. It passes over the Clee Hills, and through the towns of Cleobury Mortimer, Church Stretton, Clun and Much Wenlock, passing close to Bridgnorth, Broseley and Highley. The south-west end is at Llanfair Waterdine. East of Roman Bank, it forms a loop.

It is named after John Mytton (1796–1834), also known as Mad Jack, a Shropshire landowner, MP, horseman, foxhunter, gambler and Regency rake.
