= Wilderhope Manor =

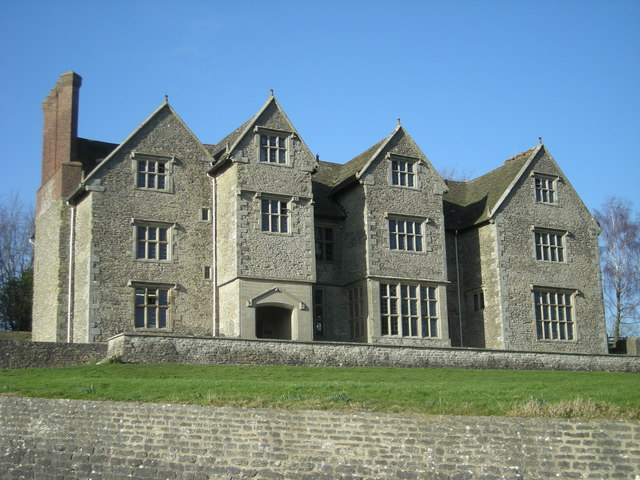

- Location within Shropshire
- 52°31′53″N 2°40′22″W
- Location: Rushbury, Shropshire, England
- OS grid reference: SO545928

History
- Built: 16th century

Listed Building – Grade I
- Designated: 12 November 1954
- Reference no.: 1383384

Wilderhope Manor is a 16th-century manor house in the care of the National Trust. It is located on Wenlock Edge 7 miles (11 km) south west of Much Wenlock in Shropshire, England. The manor is a Grade I listed building and since 1937 has been used as a youth hostel.

== History and amenities ==
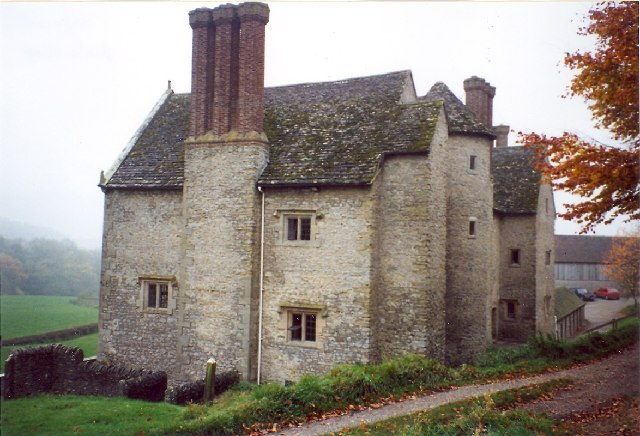
Wilderhope Manor from the rear

Wilderhope Manor is an Elizabethan-period manor house, built of local limestone and dating from 1585. The house was built for Francis Smallman and his initials can be seen on the ceilings. The manor remained in the family until 1734 when the estate including the neighbouring Wilderhope farm was sold to Thomas Lutwyche. It is believed that the manor house was not used as a main residence after the sale in 1734 and by 1936 was in a poor state and unoccupied. In 1936 the property was purchased by the W. A. Cadbury Trust who donated it to the National Trust on condition that it was used as a youth hostel. Opening as a youth hostel in 1937, it has remained in use by the Youth Hostels Association since. A £500,000 refurbishment was completed in 2012 and the youth hostel offers 72 beds including a bridal suite with a four-poster bed.

Despite years of disuse many of the original features such as the oaken stairways, oak spiral stairs and ornate plaster ceilings survived. The adjoining stable block is itself a Grade II listed building.

The manor house is in limestone with dressings in gritstone, quoins, hood moulds, copings and finials on the front, and a stone-slate roof. There are two storeys and attics, and an approximately H-shaped plan. The entrance front has six bays and four unequal gables, three of them over projecting bays. In the left projecting gable is a porch, the windows are mullioned and transomed, and at the rear is a semicircular stair turret with a conical roof.

The stables, now used for other purposes, are in brick with a storey band, and have tile roofs with parapeted gables. They have a single storey and lofts, and a U-shaped plan with a main range of three bays. The windows are casements with segmental arches, and there are doorways and loft openings.

The surrounding manor of Wilderhope is also managed by the National Trust and comprises wooded valleys, pasture, flower-rich meadows and ancient hedgerows dating back centuries along unchanged field boundaries. Evidence of medieval ridge and furrow ploughing can still be seen in fields below Wilderhope Coppice.

== Major's Leap ==
The Manor's owner during the English Civil War was Major Thomas Smallman. He was a Royalist who was forced to flee from Cromwell’s approaching troops. After managing to escape on horseback, Major Smallman took a do-or-die plunge down a steep slope at Wenlock Edge. His horse was killed but Smallman survived thanks to an apple tree breaking his fall. Since then the ghosts of Smallman and his horse are said to appear in an area now known as Major's Leap and have been said to have been seen at the manor.

== See also ==
- Grade I listed buildings in Shropshire
- Listed buildings in Rushbury
