= Robert Hart (horticulturist) =

British gardener

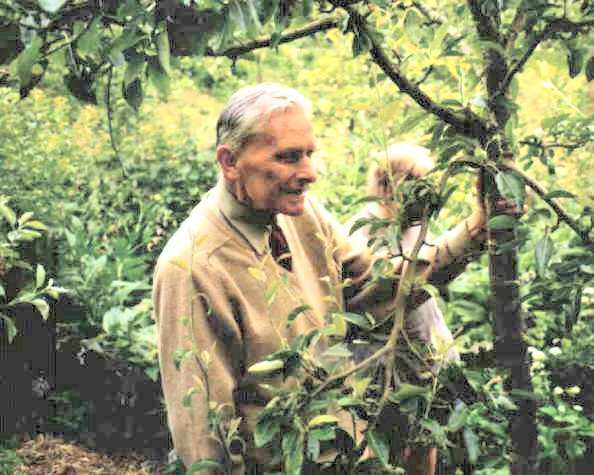
Robert Hart pictured in his forest garden, July 1997

Robert Adrian de Jauralde Hart (1 April 1913 – 7 March 2000) was an English pioneer of forest gardening in temperate zones. He created a model forest garden from a 0.12 acre (500 m²) orchard on his farm. He credits the inspiration for his work to an article by James Sholto Douglas, which was in turn inspired by the work of Toyohiko Kagawa.

== Early life ==
Hart, son of a lawyer father and a soprano mother, was born in London and educated at Westminster School, after which he was employed at Reuters news agency in charge of special Indian mails, work which involved compiling digests of weekly articles by Mahatma Gandhi, whose nonviolence philosophy he took on board.

At the outbreak of World War II he considered registering as a conscientious objector but changed mind following retreat from Dunkirk in 1940 and enlisted in the Corps of Military Police, later transferring to the Intelligence Corps to work in code-breaking.

After demobilisation, he was a dairy farmer in Norfolk and Somerset before moving to Shropshire where he took on a smallholding on Wenlock Edge.

== Wenlock Edge ==
Robert Hart began with a smallholding called Highwood Hill farm at Wenlock Edge. His intention was to provide a healthy and therapeutic environment for himself and his brother Lacon, who was born with severe learning disabilities.

Hart though soon discovered that maintaining large annual vegetable beds, rearing livestock and taking care of an orchard were tasks beyond his strength. However, he also observed that a small bed of perennial vegetables and herbs he had planted was looking after itself with little or no intervention. Furthermore, these plants provided interesting and unusual additions to the diet, and seemed to promote health and vigour in both body and mind.

== Forest garden project ==
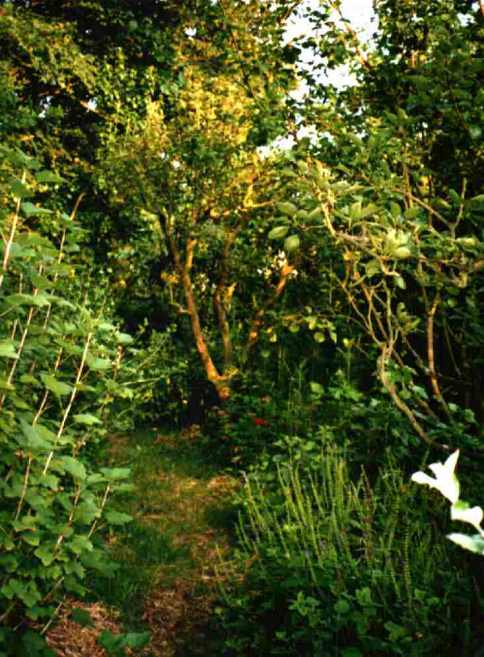
Robert Hart's forest garden in Shropshire, England

Noting the maxim of Hippocrates to "make food your medicine and medicine your food", Hart adopted a vegan, 90% raw food diet. The three main products from a forest garden are fruit, nuts and green leafy vegetables. Hart's forest garden at Wenlock Edge was a vegan organic food production system.

He also began to examine the interactions and relationships that take place between plants in natural systems, particularly in woodland, the climax ecosystem of a cool temperate region such as the British Isles. This led him to evolve the agroforestry concept of the "Forest Garden": Based on the observation that the natural forest can be divided into distinct layers or 'storeys', he developed an existing small orchard of apples and pears into an edible landscape consisting of seven dimensions;

1. A 'canopy' layer consisting of the original mature fruit trees.
2. A 'low-tree layer' of smaller nut and fruit trees on dwarfing root stocks.
3. A 'shrub layer' of fruit bushes such as currants and berries.
4. A 'herbaceous layer' of perennial vegetables and herbs.
5. A 'ground cover' layer of edible plants that spread horizontally.
6. A 'rhizosphere' or 'underground' dimension of plants grown for their roots and tubers.
7. A vertical 'layer' of vines and climbers.

Hart had a vision for the spread of the forest garden throughout even the most heavily built up areas, as he explains:

Obviously, few of us are in a position to restore the forests…But tens of millions of us have gardens, or access to open spaces such as industrial wastelands, where trees can be planted…and if full advantage can be taken of the potentialities that are available even in heavily built up areas, new 'city forests' can arise.

== Later life ==
Hart died in March 2000 aged 86 and is buried in St Peter's churchyard at Rushbury, Shropshire.

== Bibliography ==
- Inviolable Hills: Ecology, Conservation and Regeneration of the British Uplands, Stuart & W (1968). ISBN 0-7224-0101-9.
- Forest Farming: Towards a Solution to Problems of World Hunger and Conservation, co-authored with James Sholto Douglas, Rodale Press (1976). ISBN 0-7224-0142-6.
- Ecosociety: A historical study of ecological man, Natraj (1984). ISBN B0006EHVPW.
- The Forest Garden, Institute for Social Inventions (1987). ISBN 0-948826-02-9.
- Forest Gardening: Rediscovering Nature and Community in a Post-Industrial Age, Green Books (UK) (1991, 1996 revised). ISBN 1-900322-02-1.
- Can Life Survive?, essay published in Deep Ecology and Anarchism by Freedom Press (1993). ISBN 0-900384-67-0.
- Beyond the Forest Garden, Gaia Books, London (1996). ISBN 1-85675-037-X.
