= Plaish Hall =

Historic site in Shropshire, England

Coordinates: 52.564011°N 2.694532°W

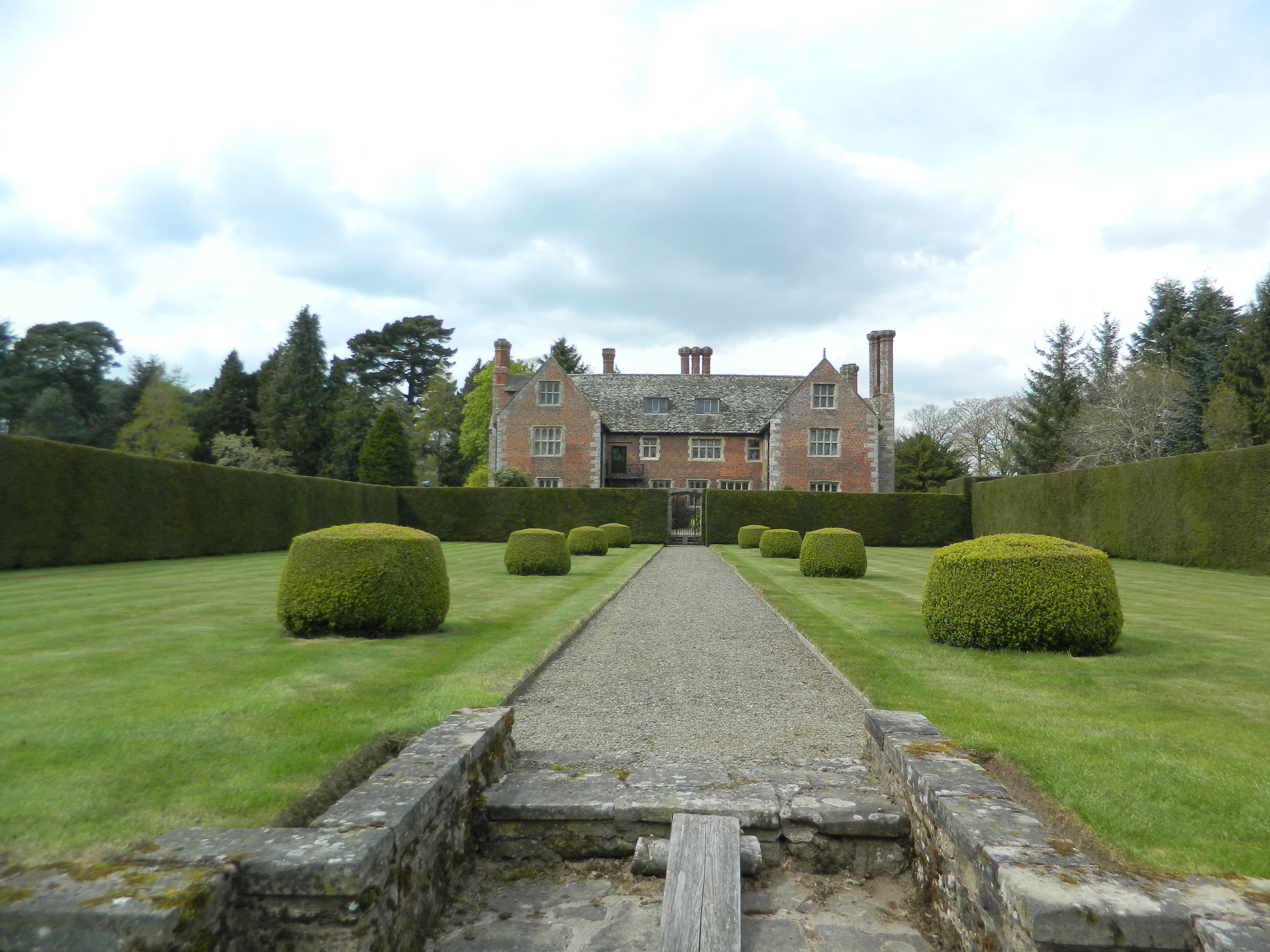

- Location within Shropshire
- Location: Plaish, Shropshire, England

History
- Built: c.1540-c.1580
- Built for: William Leighton

Listed Building – Grade I
- Official name: Plaish Hall
- Designated: 29 January 1952
- Reference no.: 1307552

Listed Building – Grade II
- Official name: Garden Walls Adjoining Plaish Hall To South East
- Designated: 7 April 1986
- Reference no.: 1055624

Plaish Hall is a country house in Plaish, in the civil parish of Cardington, in the Shropshire district, in the ceremonial county of Shropshire, England. It is recorded in the National Heritage List for England as a designated Grade I listed building.

Plaish Hall was the house of the Jacobean poet, composer and politician Sir William Leighton, who was most probably born there in c.1565.

== History ==
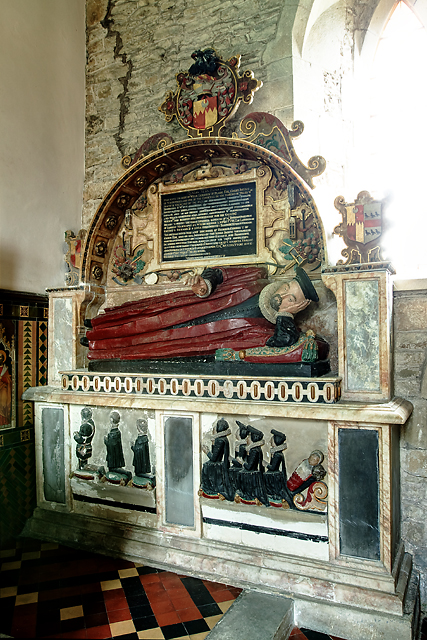
The monument to William Leighton, the Chief justice of North Wales at St James, Cardington.

The estate that surrounds Plaish Hall was first mentioned in the Domesday Book of 1086 as 'pleshā', - which is thought to derive from an Old English term for "shallow pool", 'plæsċ'. Plaish was owned by a wealthy landowner named Roger de Lacy. A manor house was built in the 15th century, on the site where Plaish Hall now stands.

William Leighton, the Chief justice of North Wales, rebuilt the 15th-century manor house between 1540 and 1580. It is not understood how Leighton came into the ownership of the manor house at Plaish; it was either purchased or inherited. Leighton did not demolish the entirety of the existing manor house when rebuilding it, and incorporated sections of it into Plaish Hall. The house which Leighton built was considerably larger and more impressive, consider to be amongst the earliest brick houses in Shropshire.

During this time in which the house was built, Leighton's son – the composer, editor and politician Sir William Leighton – was born in c.1565, most probably at Plaish Hall. Sir William Leighton was knighted in 1603 by King James I, and wrote a eulogy for him entitled 'Virtues Triumphant'. However, the year after his father's death in 1607, Sir William Leighton was sued for debts by Sir William Harmon and in 1610 was outlawed and imprisoned for debt. Sir William Leighton died in London and was buried at St Bride's, Fleet Street on 31 July 1622.

The house was Grade I listed on 29 January 1952. The garden wall was Grade II listed as "Garden Walls Adjoining Plaish Hall To South East" on 7 April 1986.

== Architecture ==
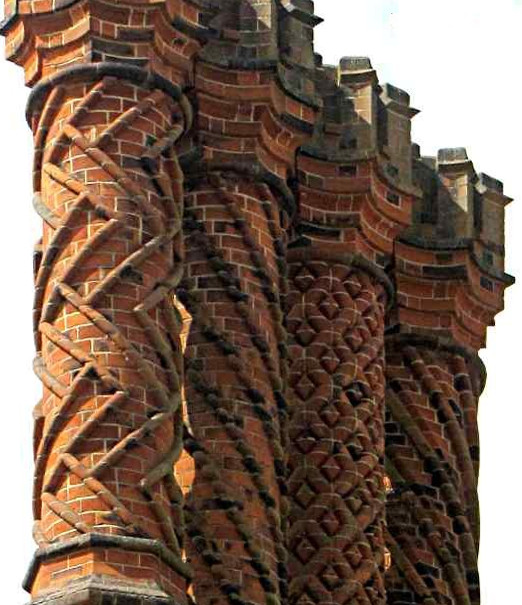
Brick chimneys at Hampton Court, which bear resemblance with the chimneys built at Plaish Hall.

The present house incorporates part of an earlier 15th-century house, and was later extended and altered. It is in red brick with blue diapering on a chamfered plinth, and has sandstone dressings, quoins, and a stone-slate roof with parapeted gables and stone copings.

The house has an H-shaped plan, with a central hall, and gabled cross-ranges, two storeys, attics and a basement. Above the doorway is a balcony with scrolled brackets and a wrought iron balustrade.

The windows vary, and include casements, some mullioned and transomed windows, and flat-roofed dormers. The chimneys were said to be inspired by those at Hampton Court, which was being constructed within the same period.

Nikolaus Pevsner remarked that Plaish Hall was "the most important of its date in Shropshire".

== Tradition ==
The folklorist and author Charlotte Sophia Burne recorded a story involving Plaish Hall in her 1883 work, 'Shropshire Folk-Lore'. It is said that William Leighton – who built Plaish Hall between 1540 and 1580 – once sentenced a builder to death as the Chief justice of North Wales. However, he then employed the man to construct the chimneys at Plaish Hall and would let the builder live, on the condition that they were "as no man ever saw before, or could build the like of after". Apparently displeased with the finished work, Leighton is said to have had the man hanged from one of the chimneys at Plaish Hall. Leighton had a reputation for hanging many men, but the actual vadility of the story is debated. The Dowager Lady Mander later recounted being told the same tale in the 1940s.

The claim that Plaish Hall was the first brick-built house in Shropshire is well-known but uncertain. Pevsner did remark, however, that Plaish Hall's brickwork would have certainly appeared impressive when first built; red-brick was "at that moment, the fashionable material".
