= Flounders' Folly =

Coordinates: 52.460574°N 2.795347°W

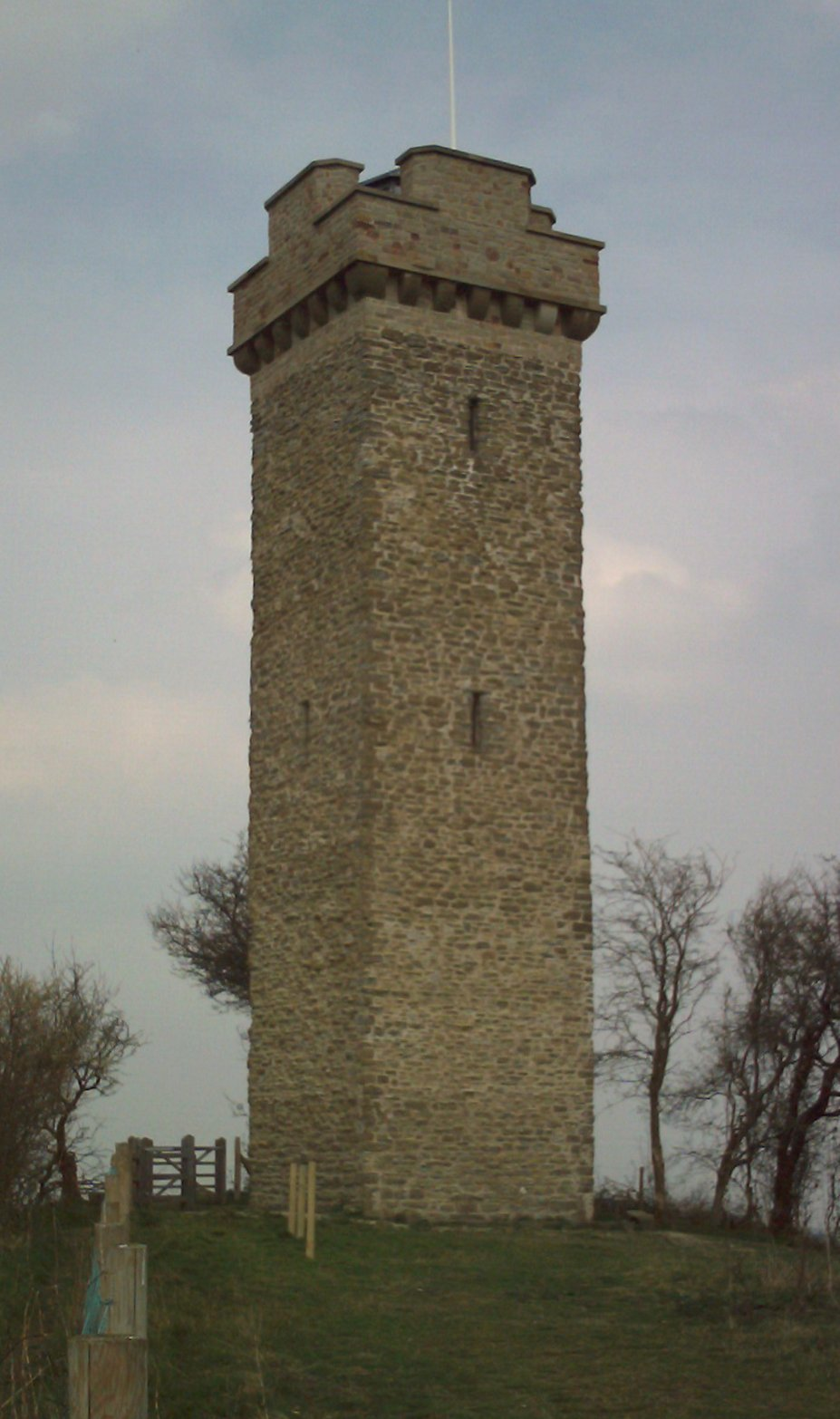
The restoration work at the top is clearly visible

Flounders' Folly is a tower built in 1838 on Callow Hill, near Craven Arms at the western end of Wenlock Edge in Shropshire, England. It is approximately 80 feet (24 m) tall, 16 feet (4.9 m) square and clearly visible on the skyline from the Cardiff–Crewe railway line, just north of Craven Arms, or from the A49 Shrewsbury to Hereford road. Many walks ascend the hill from various points and the tower is mentioned in several Shropshire walking guides.

== History ==
In 1838, the tower was erected by Benjamin Flounders (1768–1846) to mark the boundaries between four large estates and maybe to celebrate his attaining his 70th year, his 'threescore years and ten'.

Over the years following Flounders' death the tower slowly fell into disrepair on its exposed hilltop (it stands on Callow Hill, part of the same system as Wenlock Edge). Already in need of restoration in the 1920s, by the 1980s it was in a dangerous and unstable condition; the castellated top of the tower collapsed in 1987. It had changed hands several times and was owned for a time at least by the actress Julie Christie who had a house nearby for a few years.

In 2001, it was bought by what became The Flounders Folly Trust. With public interest awakened and funding from public and other sources such as The Heritage Lottery Fund forthcoming, a restoration programme was commenced in 2001 and completed by 2005. At its re-opening HRH Princess Anne, The Princess Royal, flew in by a helicopter of the Royal Flight to declare the restoration of the tower complete, and it is now open to the public at least once a month. The views from the top encompass the Shropshire Hills AONB, Wenlock Edge, the Long Mynd, both Clee Hills, the Radnorshire/Welsh hills, Mortimer Forest, the Brecon Beacons, Black Mountains and Malvern Hills.

== Folklore ==
There are a few apocryphal stories, now spun into the local and regional folklore, traditionally known and told locally that it was built so that Mr Flounders could see his ships coming in and out of the Bristol Channel (or the Mersey)—neither of which are actually visible from the tower—and that when he discovered that he could not do so because of high ground in between he killed himself by jumping off the top of the tower, or conversely descended the tower in a great huff roaring "Take it down!" meaning either the tower or the high ground. Some say he wanted to see his house in Ludlow from the tower—there are no records of him having owned or rented a house in Ludlow, where although he was for very many years a very frequent visitor he preferred to stay at The Angel on Broad Street, or the Blue Boar on Mill Street. There are also no known records of his having ships or interests in Liverpool or Bristol, as he hailed from the north-east of England, near Stockton-on-Tees.
