= Listed buildings in Rushbury =

Rushbury is a civil parish in Shropshire, England. It contains 26 listed buildings that are recorded in the National Heritage List for England. Of these, one is listed at Grade I, the highest of the three grades, one is at Grade II*, the middle grade, and the others are at Grade II, the lowest grade. The parish is almost entirely rural and contains only small scattered settlements. In the parish are a former manor house and a country house, both of which are listed together with associated structures. Most of the other listed buildings are houses, farmhouses and farm buildings, the earliest of which are timber framed or have a timber-framed core. The remainder of the listed buildings consist of a church, memorials in the churchyard, a packhorse bridge, a road bridge, a school, and a telephone kiosk.

== Key ==
Grade	Criteria
I	Buildings of exceptional interest, sometimes considered to be internationally important
II*	Particularly important buildings of more than special interest
II	Buildings of national importance and special interest

== Buildings ==
Name and location	Photograph	Date	Notes	Grade
St Peter's Church; 52.52233°N 2.71815°W		12th century	The church was altered in the 15th century, and in 1855–56 it was heavily restored and the vestry was added. The church is built in stone and has tile roofs with ornamental ridge tiles. It consists of a nave, a south porch, a chancel, a south vestry, and a west tower. The round-headed north doorway dates from about 1200. The tower has three stages, stepped buttresses, and an embattled parapet with corner pinnacles.	II*
The Coates and Associated Barns; 52.52921°N 2.70156°W	—	Late 15th century	The farmhouse, which was altered in the 17th century, is timber framed on a stone plinth, with some brick cladding and a tile roof. There are two storeys, and the farmhouse consists of a hall range and a later cross-wing, kitchen, and two-storey porch. In the hall range is a bay window and a dormer. The barns to the southwest are also timber framed and have weatherboarding. They have a V-shaped plan, and rear wings.	II
Wilderhope Manor; 52.53190°N 2.67182°W		Late 16th century	A manor house later used as a youth hostel, it is in limestone with dressings in gritstone, quoins, hood moulds, copings and finials on the front, and a stone-slate roof. There are two storeys and attics, and an approximately H-shaped plan. The entrance front has six bays and four unequal gables, three of them over projecting bays. In the left projecting gable is a porch, the windows are mullioned and transomed, and at the rear is a semicircular stair turret with a conical roof.	I
Lutwyche Hall; 52.54776°N 2.65569°W		1587	A country house that was altered in about 1730, remodelled in the 1850s by S. Pountney Smith, and altered again in the 1880s by F. P. Cockerell. It is built in brick with stone dressings, quoins, moulded storey bands, a moulded cornice, balustraded parapets with corner finials, and tile roofs with coped gables and ball finials. The main block has three storeys, the wings have two storeys and attics, and the house has an E-shaped plan. The southeast front has five bays, and in the centre is a recessed porch with an ornate surround including an oriel window and cresting under a shaped gable. The windows are mullioned and transomed with moulded surrounds.	II
Rushbury Manor; 52.52322°N 2.71823°W		c. 1600	A timber framed house with rendered infill, the ground floor in stone at the front and a plinth at the rear, and with a tile roof. There are two storeys and an attic, and an H-shaped plan, consisting of a main range with five bays and three gables with bargeboards, and a cross-wing at both ends. The windows are casements.	II
Old Hall Farmhouse; 52.52798°N 2.72522°W	—	1620	The farmhouse was extended in the 18th century and altered in the 20th century. The early parts are timber framed, the later parts are rendered or roughcast, and the roof is tiled. There are two storeys and an H-shaped plan, with a main range and projecting gabled wings. The windows are casements, there are two gabled dormers, and a lean-to porch.	II
3 Rushbury; 52.52261°N 2.71843°W		17th century	A timber framed house with rendered infill on a brick plinth and with a tile roof. There is one storey and an attic, and two bays. The windows are casements, there are two gabled dormers, and a doorway to the left with a tiled gabled canopy.	II
Church Farmhouse; 52.52277°N 2.71789°W		17th century	A farmhouse, later a private house, it is partly timber framed with infill in painted and rendered brick, and partly in stone, and has a tile roof. There is a T-shaped plan, with a main range and a cross-wing to the left with two storeys, and a lower range with one storey and an attic to the east of the main range. The windows are casements, those on the gable end of the cross-wing with projecting tiled weatherings.	II
Packhorse bridge 52.51981°N 2.71908°W		17th century	The former packhorse bridge, later a footbridge, crosses Eaton Brook. It is in stone and consists of a single segmental arch formed by voussoirs and without parapets. The bridge is about 1.5 metres (4 ft 11 in) wide with a span of about 4 metres (13 ft). The abutments are splayed. The packhorse bridge is also a Scheduled Monument.	II
The Malt House; 52.52808°N 2.72711°W	—	17th century	A farmhouse, later a private house, it was later extended. The early parts are timber framed with rendered panels, the later parts are in stone, and the roof is tiled. There are two storeys and a front of three bays, the left bay gabled. Most of the windows are casements, and there is a flat-roofed dormer.	II
The Old Rectory; 52.52197°N 2.71886°W	—	17th century	The building is thought to have a timber framed core, later encased in brick, and it was much extended and altered in 1852–53 by William Donthorne in Tudor Revival atyle. The later parts are in sandstone, and the roof is tiled. The rectory has two and three storeys. The entrance front contains a doorway with a moulded arch and mullioned windows under a hood mould. The garden front is symmetrical with three bays, and has two canted bay windows with embattled parapets. Elsewhere are sash windows, some of them horizontally-sliding, and dormers.	II
Stables, Wilderhope Manor; 52.53232°N 2.67137°W	—	c. 1700	The stables, later used for other purposes, are in brick with a storey band, and have tile roofs with parapeted gables. They have a single storey and lofts, and a U-shaped plan with a main range of three bays. The windows are casements with segmental arches, and there are doorways and loft openings.	II
Home Farmhouse; 52.53949°N 2.68014°W	—	1708	The oldest parts of the farmhouse are two rear wings dating from the early 18th century. The main block is dated 1805, and is in brick with a storey band, dentilled eaves, and a hipped tile roof with a rear parapeted gable. The main block has two storeys, and the rear wings have one storey and attics. At the front are three bays, an open cast iron porch, a doorway with pilasters and a fanlight, and sash windows that have lintels with keystones. At the rear are casement windows, a datestone, and a dormer.	II
Stables, Lutwyche Hall; 52.54798°N 2.65486°W	—	c. 1740	The stable block, which incorporates a house, is in brick with dentilled eaves courses, and tiled roofs. It is mainly in two storeys, dropping to one storey over sloping ground, and has a square courtyard plan with an extension wing. The main range has seven bays, the middle three bays projecting and containing a round-arched carriage entrance with a pendant keystone, voussoirs, and a pediment with a clock face in the tympanum. Most of the windows are casements.	II
Coach house, Lutwyche Hall; 52.54827°N 2.65551°W	—	18th century	The coach house is in stone with a brick front gable, corbelled eaves, and a tile roof. There is one storey and a loft, and a rectangular plan. In the gable end is a garage door, another doorway, a casement window, and above is a lunette. On the left side is a flight of steps leading up to a doorway.	II
Stables, Manor Farm; 52.52421°N 2.71543°W	—	18th century	The stable block includes a granary and a cartshed. It is in brick and has a tile roof with one gable coped. There is one storey and a loft, and it contains loft openings, doors, windows, and external steps.	II
Heath Bridge; 52.52950°N 2.71739°W		Late 18th century	The bridge carries the B4371 road over Heath Brook. It is in stone, and consists of a single segmental arch, with voussoirs, parapets, piers, and a string course. There are benchmarks from different dates on each of the parapets.	II
Lutwyche House; 52.52929°N 2.72127°W	—	Late 18th century	A brick house, roughcast at the rear, with a dentilled eaves course, and a tile roof. There are two storeys, and an L-shaped plan, consisting of a main range of three bays and a rear wing. There is a central gabled porch, the windows are casements with splayed lintels and raised keystones, and there are three gabled dormers.	II
Wainwright Memorial; 52.52228°N 2.71809°W	—	Late 18th century	The memorial is in the churchyard of St Peter's Church, and is to the memory of two members of the Wainwright family. It is a chest tomb in stone, and has a plain flat lid with a cornice, plain inscribed panels, fluted corner piers, and a moulded plinth.	II
The Stone House; 52.52817°N 2.72654°W	—	1800	The house is in roughcast and rendered stone with a moulded cornice and a hipped tile roof. It consists of a main range with three storeys and three bays, and a two-storey gabled rear wing. In the centre is a porch with Tuscan columns and a pediment, above which is a blind window. The other windows on the front are sashes, those in the lower floors with projecting keystones, and at the rear the windows are casements.	II
Station Farmhouse; 52.53889°N 2.67795°W	—	Late 18th or early 19th century	The farmhouse is in stone on a plinth, and has tile roofs with coped gable parapets. The main block has two storeys and an attic and three bays, and to the right is an extension with two storeys and two bays. The porch has a pointed arched opening, the windows are casements with raised keyblocks, and there are two gabled dormers.	II
Primary School; 52.52187°N 2.71812°W		1821	The school was extended to the right later in 1873. The original part is stone with brick dressings and quoins, roughcast on the front, and with a slate roof. There are two storeys, three bays, and a single-storey extension to the left. In the centre is a gabled porch, above which is a round-headed inscribed tablet, and over that in the gable is a blind oculus. The outer bays contain sash windows. The later extension is in brick with a single storey, and has windows with pointed heads, and a bellcote.	II
Cleeton Memorial; 52.52228°N 2.71845°W	—	Early 19th century	The memorial is in the churchyard of St Peter's Church, and is to the memory of two members of the Cleeton family. It is a chest tomb in stone, and has a lid with moulded edges, inscribed side panels, fluted corner piers, and a chamfered plinth.	II
Manor Farmhouse; 52.52427°N 2.71515°W	—	Early 19th century	The farmhouse is in red brick with a tile roof. It has an L-shaped plan with a main range of three storeys and three bays, and a rear wing. In the centre is a gabled porch, and the windows are sashes.	II
Webster Memorial; 52.52230°N 2.71797°W	—	Early 19th century	The memorial is in the churchyard of St Peter's Church, and is to the memory of Sarah Webster and her husband. It is a chest tomb, and has a lid with fluted edges, plain panels, fluted corner piers, and a plain plinth.	II
Telephone kiosk 52.52198°N 2.71829°W		1935	A K6 type telephone kiosk, designed by Giles Gilbert Scott. Constructed in cast iron with a square plan and a dome, it has three unperforated crowns in the top panels.	II
