= Listed buildings in Hope Bowdler =

Hope Bowdler is a civil parish in Shropshire, England. It contains eleven listed buildings that are recorded in the National Heritage List for England. All the listed buildings are designated at Grade II, the lowest of the three grades, which is applied to "buildings of national importance and special interest". The parish contains the village of Hope Bowdler and the surrounding countryside. Most of the listed buildings are memorials in the churchyard of St Andrew's Church, which is also listed. The other listed buildings are a house in the village, and a farmhouse and outbuilding in the countryside to the south.

== Buildings ==
Name and location	Photograph	Date	Notes
Chelmick Manor Farmhouse and outbuildings 52.51791°N 2.78547°W		Late 16th or early 17th century	The house and outbuilding to the left are in stone with tile roofs. On the front of the house are three bays, the right bay is gabled with two storeys and an attic, and it contains mullioned and transomed windows and two buttresses. To the left are two bays with one storey and an attic, a gabled porch, casement windows, and two gabled dormers. The outbuilding has one storey and two bays, and contains a datestone.
Ivy Cottage; 52.52734°N 2.77388°W		17th century	The house was later extended. The original part is timber framed, there is a cross-wing in stone, and an end extension in brick. The original part has a tile roof with parapeted gables, and the cross-wing has a roof of corrugated sheet. There is a single storey and an attic, and a T-shaped plan. The central doorway has a canopy, the windows are casements, there are two raking dormers, and in the cross-wing are dovecote ledges.
Thomas memorial 52.52691°N 2.77388°W	—	Early 18th century	The memorial is in the churchyard of St Andrew's Church, and is to the memory of members of the Thomas family. It consists of a double-sided headstone set vertically, and is carved on both sides. It has a moulded top, on the east side is an oval cartouche, foliage and skulls, and on the west side is an inscribed panel including a female figure and it has a decorated border.
Preen memorial 52.52700°N 2.77382°W	—	Mid 18th century	The memorial is in the churchyard of St Andrew's Church, and is to the memory of Elizabeth Preen. It consists of a double-sided headstone set vertically, it has a rounded top and raised borders, and is carved on both sides.
Wolley memorial 52.52697°N 2.77391°W	—	Mid 18th century	The memorial is in the churchyard of St Andrew's Church, and is to the memory of Mary Wolley. It is a table tomb in stone, and consists of a flat incised slab with moulded edges on four carved pedestal legs.
Hart memorial 52.52718°N 2.77381°W	—	Early 19th century	The memorial is in the churchyard of St Andrew's Church, and is to the memory of William Cheney Hart. It is a pedestal tomb in stone, and has a moulded plinth, inscribed side panels, and a shallow pyramidal lid with moulded edges and the base of a former finial. The memorial is enclosed by railings.
Heynes memorial 52.52696°N 2.77374°W	—	Early 19th century	The memorial is in the churchyard of St Andrew's Church, and is to the memory of Robert Heynes and his wife. It is a chest tomb in stone, and has a plain plinth, fluted corner piers with Doric columns, inscribed side panels with a scalloped sunburst ornament in the spandrels, and a pyramidal lid with moulded edges.
Mawn memorial 52.52700°N 2.77386°W	—	Early 19th century	The memorial is in the churchyard of St Andrew's Church, and is to the memory of Elizabeth Mawn. It is a chest tomb in stone, and has a plain plinth, plain corner piers, and plain inscribed side and end panels. The memorial incorporates material from an earlier tomb.
Unknown memorial 52.52691°N 2.77384°W	—	Early 19th century	The memorial is in the churchyard of St Andrew's Church. It is a chest tomb in stone, and has a moulded plinth, fluted corner piers, plain inscribed side and end panels, and a flat lid with a moulded edge. The inscription is illegible.
Wilding memorial 52.52699°N 2.77392°W	—	Early 19th century	The memorial is in the churchyard of St Andrew's Church, and is to the memory of members of the Wilding family. It is a chest tomb in stone, and has a moulded plinth, fluted corner piers, plain inscribed side and end panels, and a flat lid with a moulded edge.
St Andrew's Church; 52.52703°N 2.77400°W		1862–63	The church was designed by S. Pountney Smith, and re-uses material from an earlier church on the site. It is built in stone, and has a tile roof with purple and orange bands. The church consists of a nave with a south porch, a chancel with a south vestry, and a west tower. The tower has three stepped stages, a clock face on the west side, and a pyramidal roof. Most of the windows are lancets, and the east window is a triple stepped lancet.
