= Callow Hill, Shropshire =

Hill in Shropshire, England

Coordinates: 52.460°N 2.794°W

Callow Hill
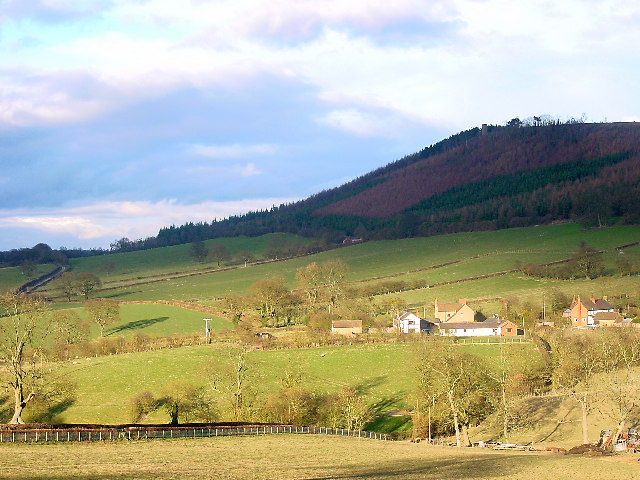

Highest point
- Elevation: 336 m (1,102 ft)
- Prominence: 154 m (505 ft)
- Parent peak: Caer Caradoc
- Listing: Marilyn

Geography
- Location: Shropshire, England
- Parent range: Shropshire Hills
- OS grid: SO460850

Callow Hill is a hill near the village of Lower Dinchope between Craven Arms and Ludlow in the English county of Shropshire. Its summit marks the highest point along the 31 kilometre length of Wenlock Edge. It is crowned by a square tower called Flounders' Folly.
