= Culmington =

Village in Shropshire, England

Coordinates: 52.434°N 2.749°W

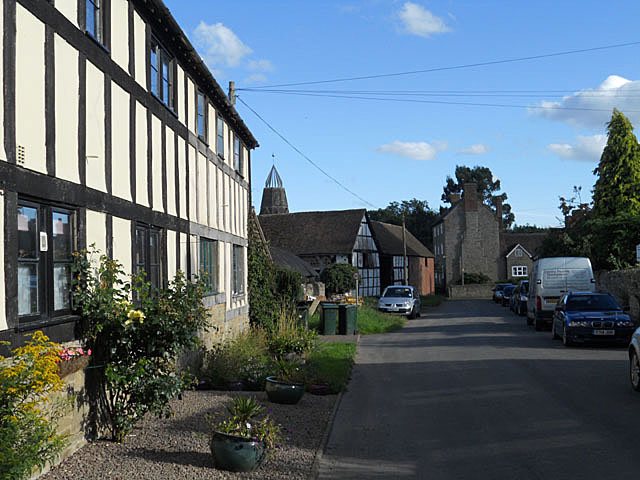
- Culmington

- Location within Shropshire
- Population: 423 (2011 Census)
- OS grid reference: SO490820
- Civil parish: Culmington
- Unitary authority: Shropshire
- Ceremonial county: Shropshire
- Region: West Midlands
- Country: England
- Sovereign state: United Kingdom
- Post town: Ludlow
- Postcode district: SY8
- Dialling code: 01584
- Police: West Mercia
- Fire: Shropshire
- Ambulance: West Midlands
- UK Parliament: Ludlow
- Website: Culmington Parish

Culmington is a village and civil parish in south Shropshire, England, about 3 1/2 miles (5.6 km) east of Craven Arms and 4 1/2 miles (7 km) north of Ludlow. The village is about 330 feet (100 m) above sea level, beside the River Corve, just east of the B4365 road. The 2011 Census recorded the parish population as 423.

== History ==
=== Medieval ===
The Domesday Book of 1086 records the parish in the hundred of Culvestan. The book records that at the time the manor of Culmington was held by Earl Roger of Shrewsbury and valued at £6. The area was entrusted to the Earl by his cousin, King William. 12 villagers were recorded in the parish, with a total of 4 slaves. Before the control of the Earl, the area of Culmington and much of the Shropshire county belonged to Edric the Wild. He is reputed to have held the Welsh border with a heavy hand. The Domesday Book records the name as "Comintone". The Saxon border thegn, Edric the Wild, held the areas of Sireton, Comitome and Elsich. Known today as Serifton, Culmington and Elsich respectively. The Saxon hundred of Culvestan was replaced in the reign of Henry I by the hundred of Munslow, of which Culmington was made a part.

The names of Culmington and the hundred of Culvestan are similar but it is not clear whether the two share a common toponymy, with Culmington's name possibly deriving from "the estate of Cuthhelm". The meaning of the first element of Culvestan is also uncertain, and may derive from another personal name, possibly Cuthwulf. The Domesday Book records two slightly different spellings of the hundred's name – twice as Colmestan(e) and once as Comestane – which are more similar to Culmington (which was spelled as Comintone). However this is believed to be the possible result of assimilation to the name of Culmington by the scribe.

The Black Death of 1348 killed three successive parish rectors. The surviving rector, William Bykerton, survived in post until 1360.

=== 18th to 20th centuries ===
In 1770 the Earl of Stafford owned the estate of Comitome. The estates of Comitome and Sirefton that were owned by the Earl were sold to Gideon Bickerdike.

Bickerdike left the estates to his nephew Benjamin Flounders who in 1838 during recession, built a tower at the conjunction of the four estates. It was hoped this would provide employment to the people.

The current Manor House was thought to be built in 1856 by Edward Wood whose family had also bought the nearby Diddlebury Hall. According to Frederic Kelly, His Majesty's Inspector of Inland Letter Carriers, the principal landowners in 1891 were Edward Wood and John Derby Allcroft. The chief crops grown on the land were wheat, barley, oats and turnips. This was due to the 'gravelly, clay loam' that the soil consisted of.

In the 19th century Culmington was described as:

"a township and a parish in Ludlow district, Salop. The township lies on the river Corve, 3 miles NE of Onibury r. station, and 4½ N by W of Ludlow. The parish includes also the townships of Burley, Siefton, and Bache and Norton; and its post town is Bromfield, Salop."

In 1929 Frederic Kelly completed another survey of Culmington and noted changes to the area. A tablet was added to the rear wall of the church bearing the names of all that fell during the Great War. By 1929, Culmington had attained a post office and laundry. A district nurse also visited the parish. A bus service was initially provided by Evans of Aston, that travelled to Ludlow.

== Demography ==
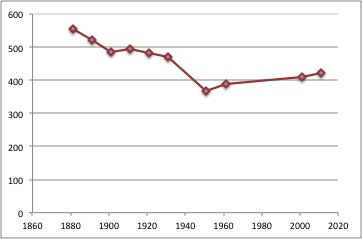
Total population of Culmington Parish, Shropshire as reported from the census of population from 1811–2011

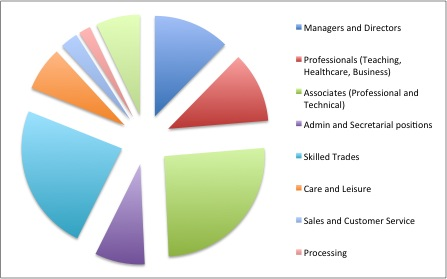
An exploding Pie Chart detailing the breakdown of type of employment within the Parish of Culmington.

The 2011 Census recorded the parish population as 423. The population time series shows a gradual increase in the parish's population post-1945. Prior to this, the population was steadily declining. At its highest total, Culmington's population was 569. That was in 1821. At the peak of the time series graph, the population was 556. The steady decline could be due to a multitude of factors, including the emergence of industrial towns over the late 19th and early 20th century.

Most of the village's population is of white British descent. 417 residents of Culmington's total population are White British. This is to be expected of rural townships such as Culmington. 211 of Culmington's population, aged from 16–74, are employed. This equates to almost half the total population of Culmington. Within this, the largest sector for employment is that of technical and professional occupations. 54 people hold employment of this kind. This is followed by 50 residents working within blue collar, skilled employment that includes many professions that would encourage self-employment.

A large proportion of the residents of Culmington are retired. Culmington's population age range is wide, but there is a preponderance of people above retirement age. The parish has a large number of children, who up to the age of 16 are not employed. There are a total of 65 dependent children within the parish. The population of Culmington has high attainment with regards to qualifications, with only 76 people having no qualifications and 110 having qualifications from Level 4 and above.

== Historic places ==
The Church of England parish church of All Saints is an 11th-century Anglo-Saxon building with a 14th-century Gothic tower. The tower has a unique aluminium structure that was added in 1970. Inside the church are the remains of a mural of the Ten Commandments. The church is a Grade II* listed building. The Rev. Robert Williams (1810–1881), author of the Lexicon Cornu-Britannicum became Rector of Culmington in 1879 and died there in 1881 and was buried in the churchyard in 1881. His gravestone is the made of slate, and its inscription is in Welsh and Cornish.

Culmington Camp Ring east of the village is the remains of a motte-and-bailey castle. It is a Scheduled Monument. The land is now cattle pasture.

Culmington Manor is a 100-acre (40 ha) estate that today hosts various events and residential trips, providing exceptional facilities in an area of outstanding natural beauty. It housed Brookside School for Maladjusted Children from the mid-1960s until 1979, and before that Hill House School. The park was created in the 19th century when the Manor was "surrounded by a small park, with two lodges at the entrance to drives".

== See also ==
- Listed buildings in Culmington
