= St James' Church, Cardington =

Coordinates: 52.5519°N 2.7295°W

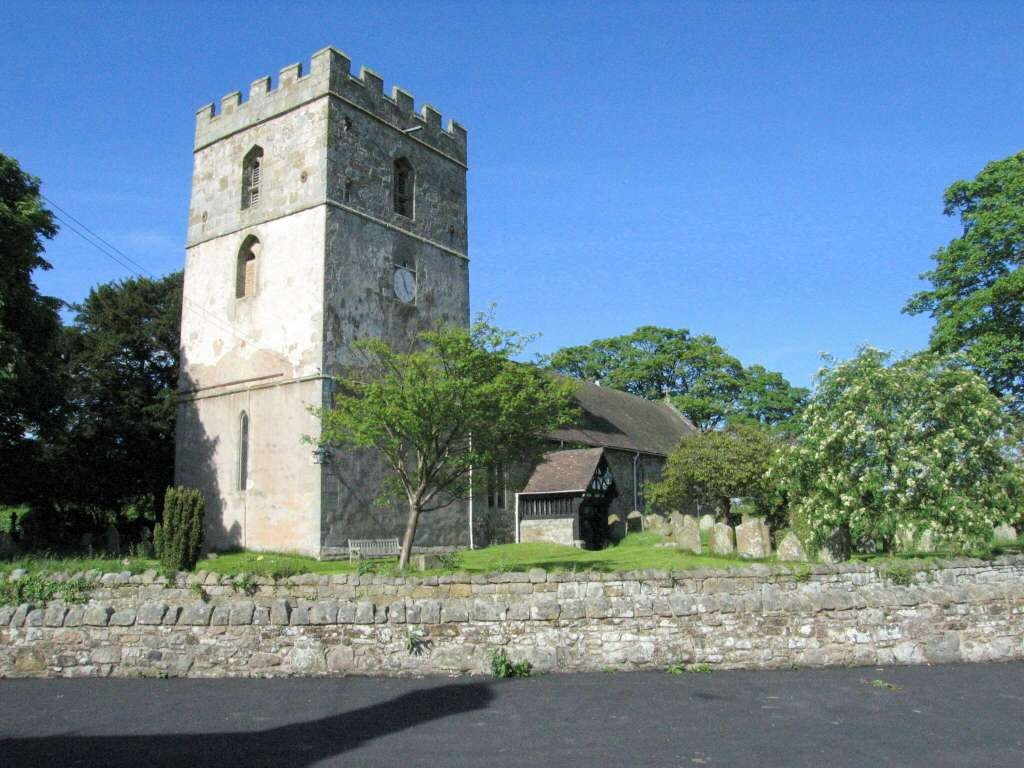
- St James' Church, Cardington, from the southwest

- Location in Shropshire
- OS grid reference: SO 506 952
- Location: Cardington, Shropshire
- Country: England
- Denomination: Anglican
- Website: Cardington, St James

History
- Status: Parish church

Architecture
- Functional status: Active
- Heritage designation: Grade I
- Designated: 13 June 1958
- Architect: Henry Curzon (restoration)
- Architectural type: Church
- Style: Norman, Gothic

Specifications
- Materials: Sandstone, tiled roofs

Administration
- Province: Canterbury
- Diocese: Hereford
- Archdeaconry: Ludlow
- Deanery: Condover
- Parish: Cardington

Clergy
- Rector: Vacant

St James' Church stands in an elevated position in the village of Cardington, Shropshire, England. It is an active Anglican parish church in the deanery of Condover, the archdeaconry of Ludlow, and the diocese of Hereford. The church is recorded in the National Heritage List for England as a designated Grade I listed building.

== History ==
The presence of a church on the site is recorded in the Domesday Book. The village, including its church, was given in 1167 to the Knights Templar, and remained in their possession until 1308. They were responsible for starting the building of the present church in the later part of the 12th century. During the following century the chancel was rebuilt and extended, and the tower was added. Further additions and alterations were made during the following three centuries, followed by the porch in 1639. Restoration was carried out between 1852 and 1868, which included removal of the gallery. As part of the restoration Henry Curzon replaced the Norman chancel arch with a much larger arch.

== Architecture ==
=== Exterior ===
The body of the church is constructed in sandstone rubble with ashlar dressings and has tiled roofs. The tower is rendered in cement and limewashed, and the porch is timber. The plan consists of a nave with a south porch, a chancel, and a west tower. The tower is in three stages with a battlemented parapet, and surmounted by a pyramidal cap with a weathervane. In the bottom stage is a lancet window on the west side. The middle stage contains paired lancets under arches, that on the south side being blocked by a clock face. The bell openings are louvred in pairs under arches. The nave contains Norman windows and doorways, some of which are blocked. The south doorway contains a door dated 1648. In the chancel are lancet windows and two-light windows containing Y-tracery. The east window consists of three stepped lancets under one arch.

=== Interior ===
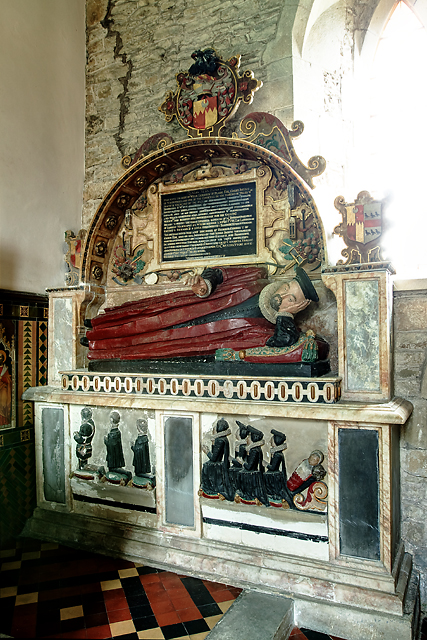
The monument to William Leighton, the Chief Justice of North Wales at St James, Cardington.

In the chancel is a 13th-century double piscina, and a square aumbry. The reredos stretches the full width of the church, and contains encaustic tiles depicting the apostles. The pulpit is in Jacobean style, and contains crude carvings of mermen. The stone font dates from 1868. The stained glass in the east window dating from 1914, a memorial to Violet Christie (died 1913) and her widower Captain Stephen Christy (killed in World War I 1914), is by Powells, and in the nave is a window with stained glass of 1955 designed by Edward Payne. The oldest monument is that of Chief Justice William Leighton who died in 1607. The two-manual pipe organ was built in about 1985 by George Sixsmith, using "much second-hand pipework". There is a ring of eight bells. The oldest of these was cast in 1626 by William and Thomas Clibury, and the next oldest by Abel Rudhall in 1752. Two bells were cast in 1887 by James Barwell, and the other four by John Taylor and Company, two in 1990 and two in 2005.

== External features ==
In the churchyard are three structures which have been designated as Grade II listed buildings. To the south of the church is a sandstone sundial dating from the middle of the 18th century. It stands on two circular stone steps, and consists of a baluster on a square base and has a moulded cap on which there is a copper dial and gnomon. Nearby is a pedestal tomb dated 1831 to the memory of Richard Butler. The third item consists of a group of five chest tombs dating from the late 18th and early 19th centuries.

Not listed is the parish war memorial, a white marble cross unveiled in 1922 within the churchyard, which lists 14 men who died in World War I and one in World War II.

== See also ==
- Grade I listed churches in Shropshire
- Listed buildings in Cardington, Shropshire
