= Eaton-under-Heywood =

Civil parish in Shropshire, England

Coordinates: 52.506°N 2.740°W

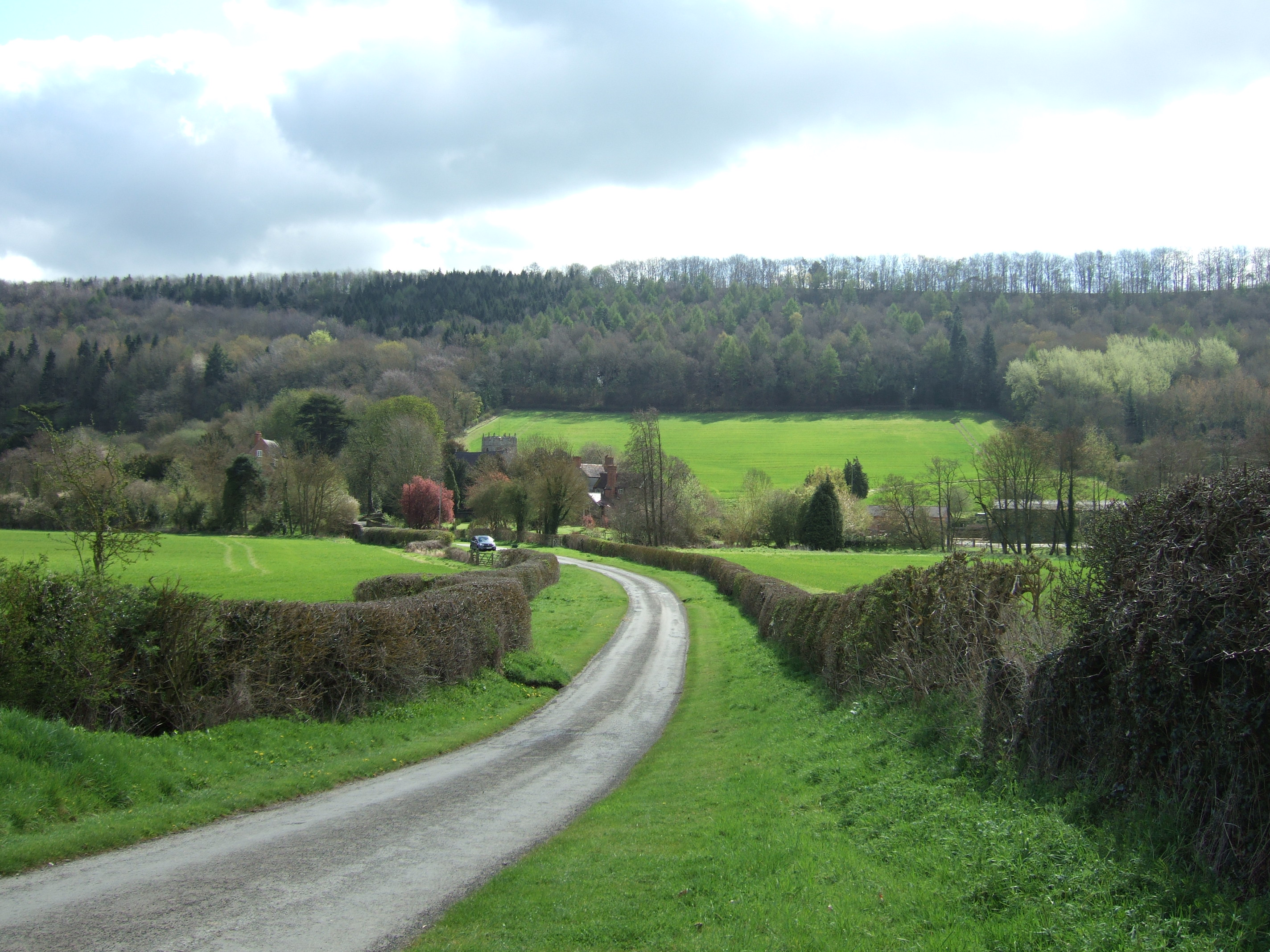
- Eaton with Wenlock Edge behind

- Location within Shropshire
- Population: 171 (2011)
- OS grid reference: SO497900
- Civil parish: Eaton-under-Heywood
- Unitary authority: Shropshire
- Ceremonial county: Shropshire
- Region: West Midlands
- Country: England
- Sovereign state: United Kingdom
- Post town: CHURCH STRETTON
- Postcode district: SY6
- Dialling code: 01694
- Police: West Mercia
- Fire: Shropshire
- Ambulance: West Midlands
- UK Parliament: Ludlow

Eaton-under-Heywood is a civil parish in Shropshire, England. The population of the civil parish at the 2011 census was 171.

It is named after the small village of Eaton, which lies under Wenlock Edge and the woods along it. The village is also known as Eaton-under-Heywood (to distinguish it from the other places called Eaton) and the parish/village is sometimes spelt as Eaton-under-Haywood.

A path, which is a public right of way, leads straight up the Edge from the village. It is called Jacob's Ladder. There is also a bridleway up the Edge from Eaton.

The village of Ticklerton and the hamlets of Birtley, Harton, Hatton, Soudley and Wolverton are in the parish. The nearest town is Church Stretton.

The historic parish church here is St Edith's.

A little over a mile to the south are the earthwork remains of Middlehope Castle, a motte and bailey which was probably left unfinished.

== See also ==
- Listed buildings in Eaton-under-Heywood
- Simon Brown, Baron Brown of Eaton-under-Heywood
