= William Leighton =

English composer

Sir William Leighton (/ˈleɪtən/ LAY-tən; c. 1565 – buried 31 July 1622) was an English Jacobean composer and editor who published The Teares and Lamentacions of a Sorrowfull Soule (1614). He was also a politician.

== Family ==
Leighton was first son of William Leighton (died 1607) of Plaish Hall, Cardington, Shropshire, who was Chief Justice of North Wales, and of his wife Isabella, daughter of Thomas Onslow of London.

Leighton married Winifred, daughter of Simon Harcourt, of Ellenhall, Staffordshire, by whom he had one son and two daughters. His wife died in 1616.

Leighton seems to have been in poor standing with his own father, who in the latter's will divided his property between William's half-brother and William's then infant son. William was not allowed use of his son's portion unless he gave "good and sufficient sureties". Leighton's biographer 'J.J.C.' suggests it was probably because Leighton had been a follower of Elizabeth I's disgraced favourite the Earl of Essex, to whom Leighton had written letters in 1600.

== Career ==
For education, Leighton recordedly attended Shrewsbury School in 1577, followed by admission as a law student to the Inner Temple in 1580.

Leighton served as MP for Much Wenlock in the last Elizabethan parliament in 1601. He was knighted by King James I in 1603. He is recorded as a Gentleman Pensioner in the royal households of Elizabeth I and James I from 1602 to 1606 or 1609.

In 1605, he was heavily fined for bearing witness in support of the claims of Robert Dudley the explorer and claimant to the peerage of his illegitimate father, the late Robert Dudley, 1st Earl of Leicester, who had been another favourite of Elizabeth I.

In 1608, he was sued for debts by Sir William Harmon, and in 1610 was outlawed and imprisoned for debt. He may have still been in prison when Teares and Lamentations was written.

Leighton died in London and was buried at St Bride's, Fleet Street on 31 July 1622.

== Literary work ==
Virtue Triumphand [Triumphant], produced in 1603, is believed to have led to his knighthood. It is a eulogy to King James, with allusions to Classical writers and the Bible.

The Teares and Lamentations of a Sorrowfull Soul comprised 55 pieces by 21 composers (among them John Bull, William Byrd, John Dowland and Martin Peerson), including eight by himself, and with prefatory notes by inter alia diplomat Sir Arthur Hopton and theologian John Layfield. There is a modern edition published by Stainer and Bell and a modern facsimile. Several radio broadcasts have been made but no commercial recording has been carried out yet. The book is historically important because it has parts for an instrumental accompaniment of broken consort and introduces the term "consort song".
