= Birtley, Shropshire =

Village in Shropshire, England

Coordinates: 52.511°N 2.772°W

Birtley
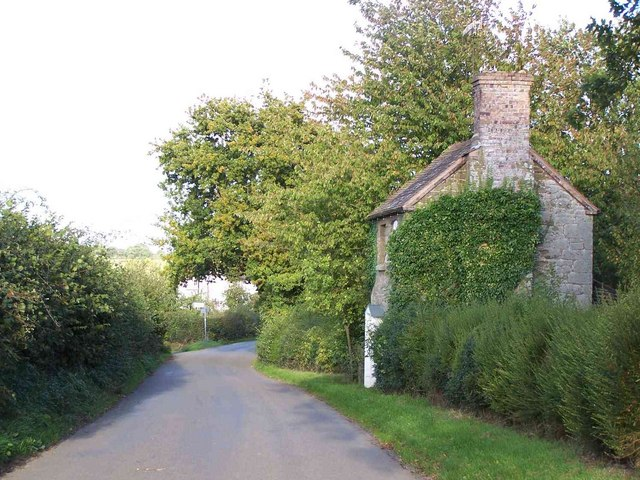
- A small dwelling in the hamlet

- Location within Shropshire
- OS grid reference: SO476906
- Civil parish: Eaton-under-Heywood
- Unitary authority: Shropshire
- Ceremonial county: Shropshire
- Region: West Midlands
- Country: England
- Sovereign state: United Kingdom
- Post town: CHURCH STRETTON
- Postcode district: SY6
- Dialling code: 01694
- Police: West Mercia
- Fire: Shropshire
- Ambulance: West Midlands
- UK Parliament: Ludlow

Birtley is a hamlet in Shropshire, England. It is situated a short distance to the west of the village of Ticklerton, in countryside to the south-east of the market town of Church Stretton. It lies within the civil parish of Eaton-under-Heywood, at an altitude of 195 metres (640 ft).
