= Soudley, Shropshire =

Village in Shropshire, England

Coordinates: 52.856°N 2.409°W

Soudley
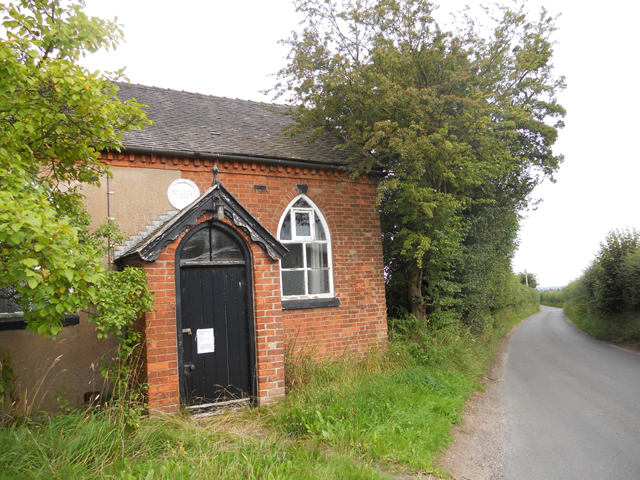
- Closed Soudley Chapel

- Location within Shropshire
- OS grid reference: SJ725289
- Civil parish: Cheswardine
- Unitary authority: Shropshire
- Ceremonial county: Shropshire
- Region: West Midlands
- Country: England
- Sovereign state: United Kingdom
- Post town: MARKET DRAYTON
- Postcode district: TF9
- Dialling code: 01630
- Police: West Mercia
- Fire: Shropshire
- Ambulance: West Midlands
- UK Parliament: North Shropshire

Soudley is a village in Shropshire in the civil parish of Cheswardine. The village had a pub called The Wheatsheaf until it was destroyed by fire. There is also a small disused Methodist chapel.
