= Ticklerton =

Village in Shropshire, England

Coordinates: 52.513°N 2.761°W

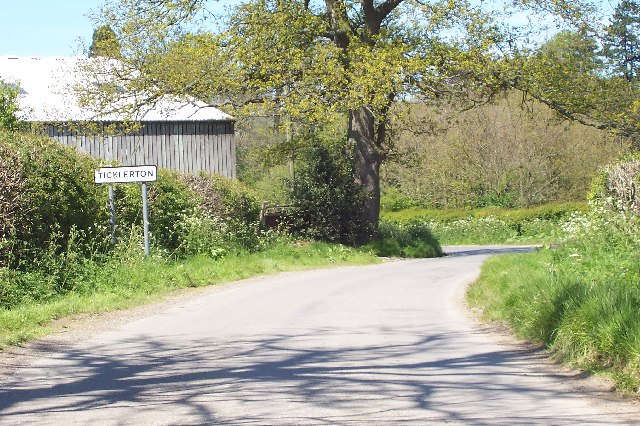
- Entering the village

- Location within Shropshire
- OS grid reference: SO483908
- Civil parish: Eaton-under-Heywood
- Unitary authority: Shropshire
- Ceremonial county: Shropshire
- Region: West Midlands
- Country: England
- Sovereign state: United Kingdom
- Post town: CHURCH STRETTON
- Postcode district: SY6
- Dialling code: 01694
- Police: West Mercia
- Fire: Shropshire
- Ambulance: West Midlands
- UK Parliament: Ludlow

Ticklerton is a small village in Shropshire, England. It is situated in countryside to the south-east of the market town of Church Stretton. It lies in the civil parish of Eaton-under-Heywood; nearby is the hamlet of Birtley.

The village barely qualifies as such since it possesses no public house, post office, shop or church. However, it does have a thriving village hall and activities centred on it. The village holds a very traditional fete on the first Saturday of June each year. The village and its community was transformed and brought bouncing back to life in the mid 1970s by the arrival of new families to the parish. It is safe to say, many children of the time would proclaim that Ticklerton had one of the greatest youth clubs and discos, which drew children from many surrounding parishes. This was notably driven by the compassion of William and Judith Shaw, who loved family and village life and lived at Ticklerton Hall 1973–2008.

English-Australian scientist Robert Arthur Buddicom (1874-1951) was born at Ticklerton.

== See also ==
- Listed buildings in Eaton-under-Heywood
