= Wenlock Edge =

Limestone escarpment near Much Wenlock, Shropshire, England

Coordinates: 52°33′1″N 2°39′17″W

Wenlock Edge is a limestone escarpment near Much Wenlock, Shropshire, England and a site of special scientific interest because of its geology. It is over 19 miles (31 km) long, running southwest to northeast between Craven Arms and Much Wenlock, and is roughly 1,083 feet above sea level. The deciduous woodland which runs along it covers much of the steep slopes of the escarpment and in parts it is very well preserved.

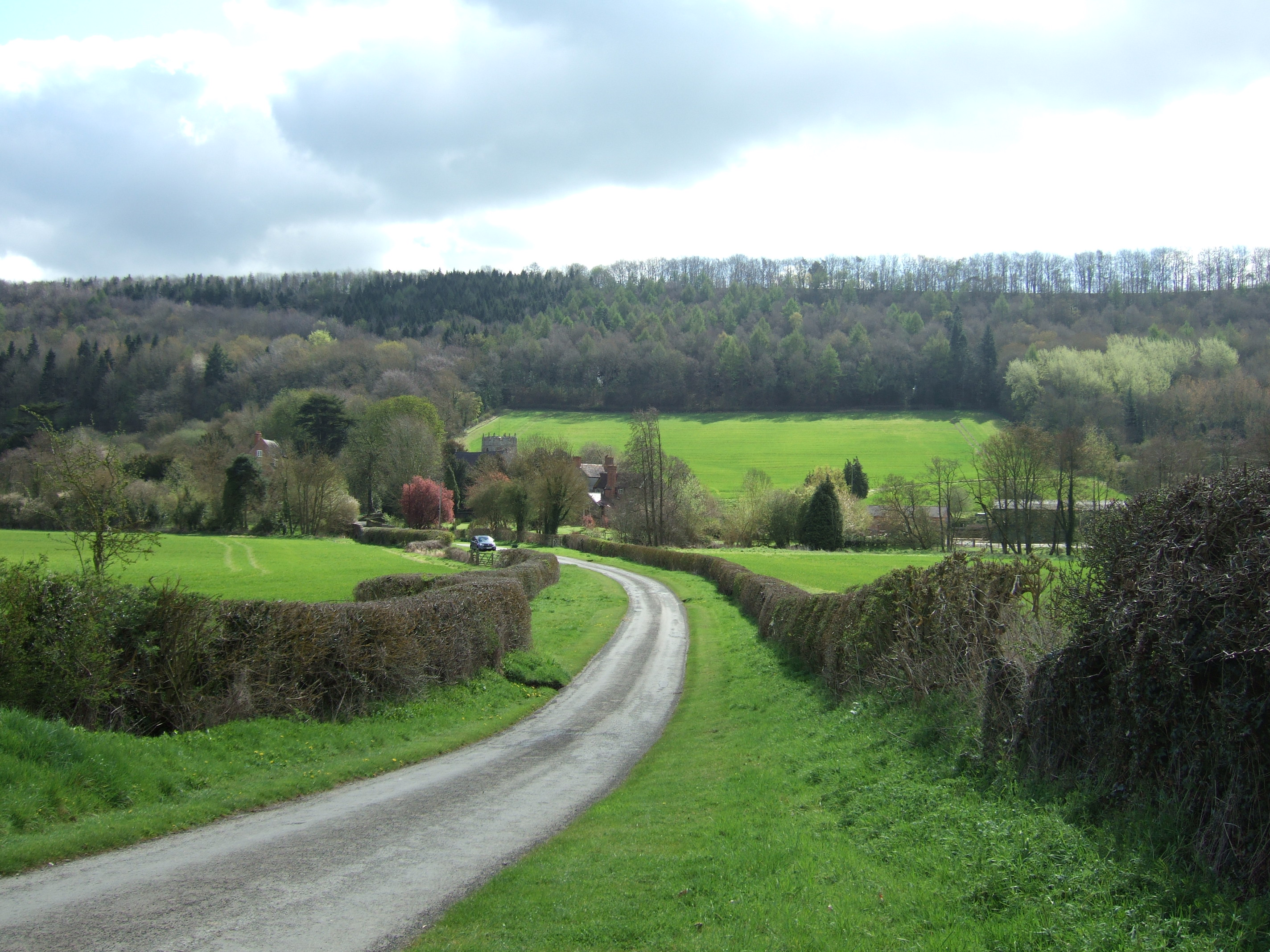
The Edge at Eaton under Heywood

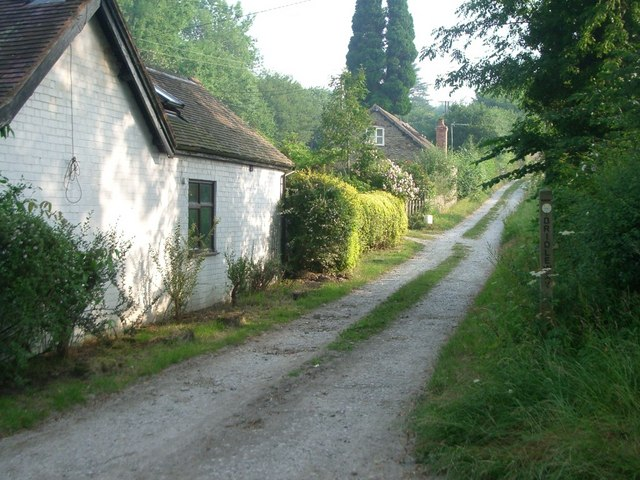
Jack Mytton Way, near Rushbury, Wenlock Edge, Shropshire

It was featured on the 2005 TV programme Seven Natural Wonders as one of the wonders of the Midlands.

Wenlock Edge contains many interesting features such as Flounders' Folly, Wilderhope Manor and Shipton Hall and waymarked walks such as the Shropshire Way and bridleways such as the Jack Mytton Way. It is a popular area for hillwalking, cycling, mountain biking and horseriding and is also frequented by tourists and sightseers.

Robert Hart created a model forest garden from a small orchard on his farm called Highwood Hill in Wenlock Edge.

== Geology ==
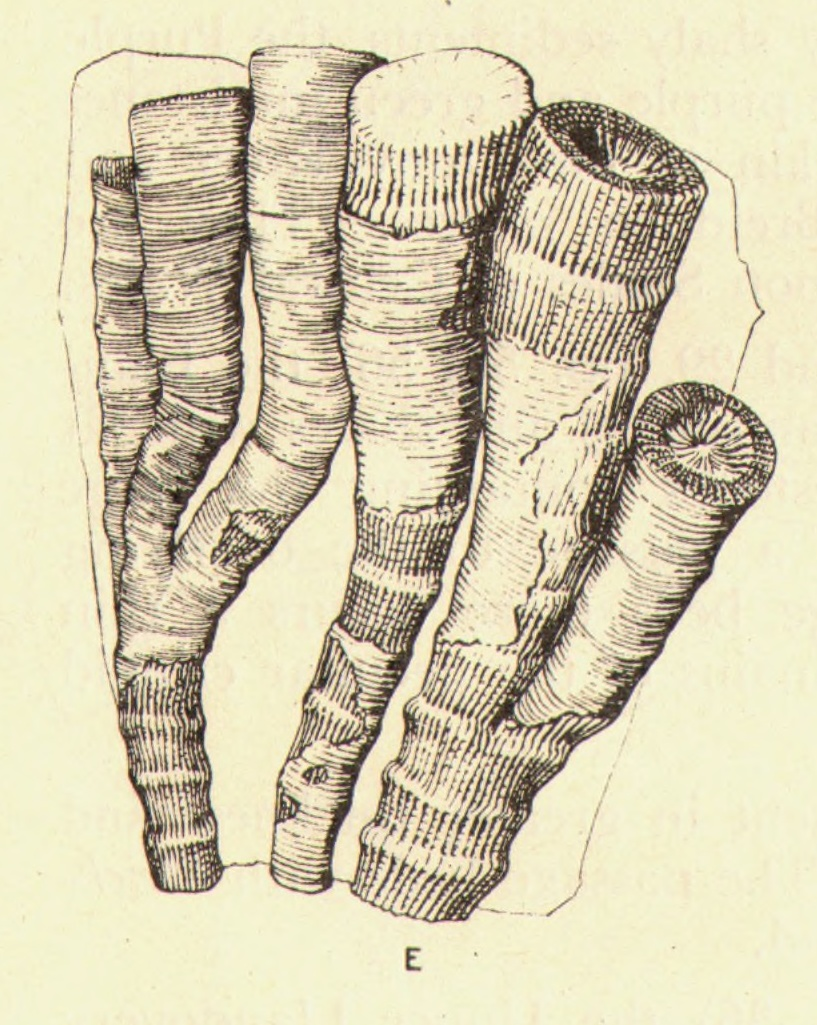
A fossil coral from the Wenlock Limestone

The "world famous Wenlock Limestone outcrops" are amongst "Britain’s most important geological sites". The limestone quarries in the North "demonstrate the best examples of reef development during the Silurian Period in Britain." Many species of brachiopods, trilobites and ostracod (microscopic crustaceans) were first found at Wenlock and most of the known Wenlock group Silurian fauna comes from here. Richard Corfield also gave Wenlock Edge as an example of the most spectacular reef building the world has ever known.
The reef was formed in shallow subtropical seas about 425 million years ago when the area was south of the equator at about the same latitude as the Seychelles is today. A walk by a BBC journalist in 2008 found abundant fossilised crinoids (sea lilies) and brachiopods. The Wenlock Epoch of the Silurian Period is named for the rocks of Wenlock Edge.

== Legends ==
Ippikin

Local legend tells of a local robber and bandit named Ippikin, who buried his ill-gotten gains in the vicinity of the edge. Tales tell that should anyone stand on the escarpment and say "Ippikin, Ippikin, keep away with your long chin" that they will be pushed over the edge by the ghost of the erstwhile villain.

Major's Leap

In the English Civil War a Major Thomas Smallman of nearby Wilderhope Manor was a Royalist officer who was forced to flee from Cromwell's approaching troops after escaping from his manor. As he was carrying important dispatches, he was cornered on the Wenlock Edge. Rather than surrender, he galloped his horse off the edge falling some 200 feet. His horse was killed but the Major was saved by falling into an apple tree. He made his way on foot to Shrewsbury where he delivered the despatches. The area where he made the jump is known as Major's Leap and is said to be haunted by the Major and his horse.

== Transport ==
=== Rail ===
Served by Transport for Wales on the Welsh Marches Line and Heart of Wales Line at Church Stretton and Craven Arms.

=== Bus ===
2012 saw the introduction of a Shropshire Hills Shuttle service that operates at weekends and on bank holidays during the spring and summer. The route, called the "Wenlock Wanderer", connects the towns of Much Wenlock and Church Stretton, and operates mostly along the B4371 which runs atop the Wenlock Edge. It also calls at Ticklerton, Acton Scott and Marshbrook to the south of Church Stretton. The Shrewsbury road down Wenlock Hill is one of the steepest main roads in the United Kingdom, with a gradient of 1 in 6.

== Cultural references ==
It is the setting for A. E. Housman's poem "On Wenlock Edge the Wood's in Trouble", poem XXXI in his 1896 collection A Shropshire Lad. In 1909, Ralph Vaughan Williams composed a song cycle called On Wenlock Edge, which comprises settings of that and five other Housman poems. It is also the subject of several works by the famous artist L. S. Lowry, with his piece A Bit of Wenlock Edge, which is a fine pencil drawing of the escarpment, detailing the woodland. Housman's poem, in turn, is at the centre of a discussion in Alice Munro's short story "Wenlock Edge".

In his alternate history novel SS-GB, set in a German-occupied Great Britain during World War II, Len Deighton places a Gestapo concentration camp in Wenlock Edge.
