= Cardington, Shropshire =

Village and civil parish in Shropshire, England

Coordinates: 52.552°N 2.728°W

Cardington
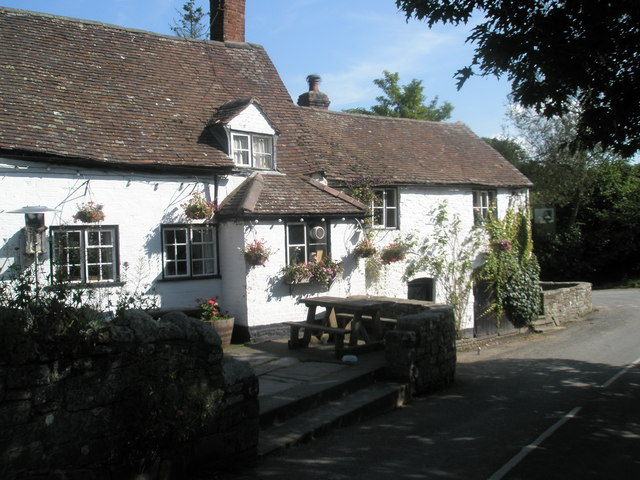
- The Royal Oak public house, Cardington

- Location within Shropshire
- Population: 459 (2011)
- OS grid reference: SO506952
- Civil parish: Cardington
- Unitary authority: Shropshire
- Ceremonial county: Shropshire
- Region: West Midlands
- Country: England
- Sovereign state: United Kingdom
- Post town: CHURCH STRETTON
- Postcode district: SY6
- Dialling code: 01694
- Police: West Mercia
- Fire: Shropshire
- Ambulance: West Midlands
- UK Parliament: Shrewsbury and Atcham

Cardington is a village and civil parish in Shropshire, England. It is situated south of Shrewsbury, near Caer Caradoc Hill, and the nearest town is Church Stretton. The parish also contains the villages of Enchmarsh and Plaish, and most of the parish is in the Shropshire Hills National Landscape.

== History ==
In the Domesday Book the village is referred to as “Cardintine under the Fief of Rainwald Vicecomes” and it is mentioned that there were 11 leagues of woodland. Soon after that date the area had associations with the Fitzalans (ancestors of the Earls of Arundel), who gave Cardington and Lydley Hayes (or deer park) to the military order of the Knights Templar in 1167. The order was suppressed in 1308 and the lands involved reverted to the original donors.

Subsequent history is largely based on several important families that lived within the Parish, some of whom started charities for the education of the young or for the provision of food for the poor. One example is the Old Free School which still stands next to the churchyard and was provided from a bequest in the will of William Hall in 1740 for the building of a schoolhouse and the maintenance of the schoolmaster.

== Listed buildings ==
Cardington is a small rural village whose form, layout and overall size was already well established by the 14th century and which remains largely unchanged. There are several buildings that date from before 1600 including "The Barracks", the Maltster's Tap (of c. 1600) and its associated Longhouse. Several other buildings belong to the early 17th century including Manor Farm, Grove Farm, the Royal Oak public house and also the timber framed barns that are common throughout the village. The old Free School is an early example of a brick building in this part of rural Shropshire.

The remaining listed buildings and most of the unlisted cottages date from between the early 18th and 19th centuries, the most ambitious of which is the old Vicarage on the western fringe of the village. The latter was built c. 1814–15 and is an accomplished piece of domestic design from the Regency period.

== St James's Church ==
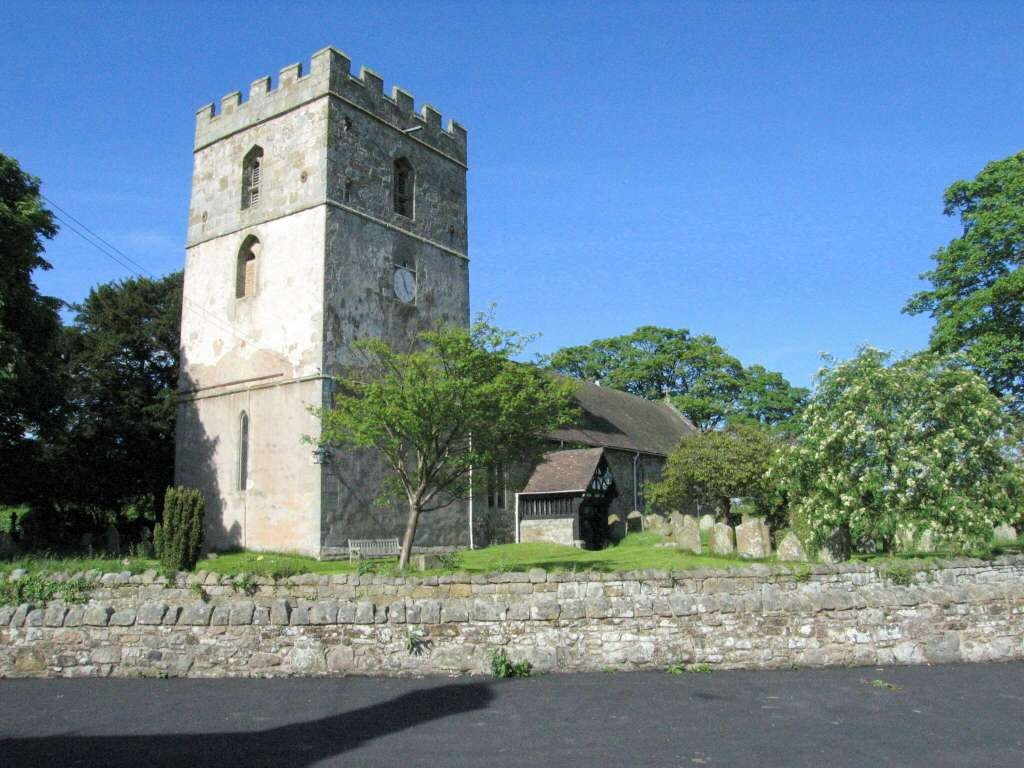
St James's Church, Cardington

The most important building in the village is the Church of St James (a grade I listed building), the nave of which dates from the Norman period. In plan it is typical of the simplest of churches from the Norman period, consisting of a short rectangular nave with a squat west tower. A chancel was added in c. 1300 in the form of a simple continuation of the nave. The linear character of the building is carried into the strong west tower, which rises in three stages and is crowned by an embattled parapet. The top or belfry stage was added in the 14th century. The fine timber porch was added in 1639.

== Notable people ==
- Sir William Leighton (c.1565-1622), politician and Jacobean composer, was son of Chief Justice William Leighton of Plaish Hall in this parish.
- Sir Frederick Corfield (1915-2005), Conservative politician, owned and lived on the Chatwall estate in this parish from 1939 until he sold it in 1951. He retained the advowson of Cardington church and some land in the parish whose rents he donated to the church.

== See also ==
- Listed buildings in Cardington, Shropshire
