= Grade I listed buildings in Shropshire =

Shropshire shown within England

There are over 9000 Grade I listed buildings in England. The following is a selected list of these buildings in the county of Shropshire, organised by district.

== Shropshire ==
Name	Location	Type	Completed (Note: The date given is the date used by Historic England as significant for the initial building or that of an important part in the structure's description.)	Date designated	Grid ref. (Note: The grid reference is based on the British national grid reference system, sometimes known as OSGB36, used by the Ordnance Survey.) Geo-coordinates	Entry number (Note: The "List Entry Number" is a unique number assigned to each listed building and scheduled monument by Historic England.)	Image
Church of the Holy Trinity	Holdgate, Abdon	Church	12th century	12 November 1954	SO5616589591; 52°30′09″N 2°38′50″W	1383399	Church of the Holy Trinity More images
Acton Burnell Castle	Acton Burnell	Manor house	1284-1285	13 June 1958	SJ5338201898; 52°36′46″N 2°41′24″W	1366722	Acton Burnell Castle More images
Church of St Mary	Acton Burnell	Church	1250-1280	13 June 1958	SJ5334901932; 52°36′47″N 2°41′25″W	1366700	Church of St Mary More images
Acton Round Hall	Acton Round	House	Queen Anne	29 November 1951	SO6360895578; 52°33′25″N 2°32′18″W	1053221	Acton Round Hall More images
Church of Saint Peter	Adderley	Church	1635-7	10 February 1959	SJ6610539533; 52°57′08″N 2°30′21″W	1055290	Church of Saint Peter More images
Wattlesborough Castle, Remains Of, Adjoining Wattlesborough to North West	Alberbury with Cardeston	Castle	Late 13th century	29 January 1952	SJ3550812621; 52°42′27″N 2°57′21″W	1366883	Wattlesborough Castle, Remains Of, Adjoining Wattlesborough to North West More images
Attingham Park	Atcham	House	1783-1785	29 January 1952	SJ5498909891; 52°41′05″N 2°40′02″W	1055094	Attingham Park More images
Church of St Eata	Atcham	Church	12th century	13 June 1958	SJ5409509194; 52°40′43″N 2°40′49″W	1176664	Church of St Eata More images
Cronkhill	Cronkhill, Atcham	House	17th century	29 January 1952	SJ5357708283; 52°40′13″N 2°41′17″W	1176915	Cronkhill More images
Longner Hall and Short Section of Forecourt Wall Adjoining to North West	Longner, Atcham	House	1803	29 January 1952	SJ5287011076; 52°41′43″N 2°41′56″W	1055105	Longner Hall and Short Section of Forecourt Wall Adjoining to North West More images
Benthall Hall	Benthall, Barrow	House	Late 16th century	24 October 1950	SJ6580402609; 52°37′13″N 2°30′24″W	1176832	Benthall Hall More images
Church of St Giles	Barrow	Church	Developed between C8 and c1100	24 October 1950	SO6579099983; 52°35′48″N 2°30′23″W	1367837	Church of St Giles More images
Church of St Leonard	Linley, Barrow	Church	Late 12th century	24 October 1950	SO6866098505; 52°35′00″N 2°27′50″W	1176860	Church of St Leonard More images
Church of All Saints	Berrington	Church	13th century	13 June 1958	SJ5304206860; 52°39′27″N 2°41′44″W	1176997	Church of All Saints More images
Cross in Churchyard of Church of St Mary	Bitterley	Cross	14th century	12 November 1954	SO5708777296; 52°23′31″N 2°37′55″W	1383653	Cross in Churchyard of Church of St Mary More images
Bishop Percy's House	Bridgnorth	House	1580	18 July 1949	SO7180893088; 52°32′06″N 2°25′01″W	1367867	Bishop Percy's House More images
Church of St Mary the Virgin	Bromfield	House	16th century	12 November 1954	SO4819976810; 52°23′13″N 2°45′45″W	1291888	Church of St Mary the Virgin More images
Abbey House with attached 5 Bay Arcade, incorporating Dovecote	Buildwas	Abbey	13th century	24 February 1986	SJ6436404354; 52°38′09″N 2°31′41″W	1366862	Abbey House with attached 5 Bay Arcade, incorporating Dovecote
Buildwas Abbey Comprising Guardianship Monument and Part of Claustral Ranges in Grounds of Abbey House	Buildwas	Abbey	1135	13 June 1958	SJ6432204301; 52°38′07″N 2°31′43″W	1175126	Buildwas Abbey Comprising Guardianship Monument and Part of Claustral Ranges in Grounds of Abbey House More images
Church of St Mary	Burford	Church	12th century	12 November 1954	SO5832568028; 52°18′32″N 2°36′46″W	1383422	Church of St Mary More images
Church of St James	Cardington	Church	12th century	13 June 1958	SO5063495149; 52°33′07″N 2°43′46″W	1366702	Church of St James More images
Plaish Hall	Plaish, Cardington	House	15th century	29 January 1952	SO5301896480; 52°33′51″N 2°41′40″W	1307552	Plaish Hall More images
Church of St Peter	Chelmarsh	Church	12th century	9 March 1970	SO7205587847; 52°29′16″N 2°24′47″W	1188126	Church of St Peter More images
Church of St Michael	Chirbury, Chirbury with Brompton	Church	Late C12-1536	21 March 1968	SO2613198513; 52°34′46″N 3°05′30″W	1055048	Church of St Michael More images
Remains of Compound Pier approx. 20 Metres North East of Chancel of Church of St Michael	Chirbury, Chirbury with Brompton	Pillar	Late 13th century	21 March 1968	SO2615298546; 52°34′47″N 3°05′29″W	1055050	Upload Photo
Church of St Lawrence	Church Stretton	Church	12th century	4 July 1952	SO4523993675; 52°32′17″N 2°48′32″W	1383267	Church of St Lawrence More images
Church of All Saints	Claverley	Church	Norman	9 March 1970	SO7926493425; 52°32′18″N 2°18′26″W	1188258	Church of All Saints More images
Ludstone Hall	Claverley	House	c. 1607	29 November 1951	SO7999994483; 52°32′52″N 2°17′47″W	1053874	Ludstone Hall More images
Church of St Mary	Cleobury Mortimer	Church	12th century	12 November 1954	SO6740075791; 52°22′45″N 2°28′49″W	1383457	Church of St Mary More images
Mawley Hall	Cleobury Mortimer	House	c. 1730	12 November 1954	SO6886075258; 52°22′28″N 2°27′32″W	1383432	Mawley Hall More images
Remains of Clun Castle	Clun	Castle	1090-1110	1 December 1951	SO2983880978; 52°25′20″N 3°01′59″W	1295475	Remains of Clun Castle More images
Church of St Swithun	Clunbury	Church	18th century	21 March 1968	SO3709480657; 52°25′13″N 2°55′35″W	1367001	Church of St Swithun More images
Condover Hall	Condover	House	1598	3 November 1955	SJ4952105658; 52°38′47″N 2°44′51″W	1055706	Condover Hall More images
Church of St Peter	Cound	Church	13th century	13 June 1958	SJ5582304996; 52°38′27″N 2°39′15″W	1055560	Church of St Peter More images
Cound Hall	Cound	House	1704	13 June 1958	SJ5607405329; 52°38′38″N 2°39′02″W	1177385	Cound Hall More images
Church of St John the Baptist	Stokesay, Craven Arms	Church	19th century	12 November 1954	SO4358681741; 52°25′51″N 2°49′52″W	1269934	Church of St John the Baptist More images
Stokesay Castle and Gatehouse Including Moat Retaining Walls	Stokesay, Craven Arms	House	c1391-1400	12 November 1954	SO4356181695; 52°25′49″N 2°49′53″W	1269939	Stokesay Castle and Gatehouse Including Moat Retaining Walls More images
Church of St Edith	Eaton-under-Heywood	Church	12th century	12 November 1954	SO4998690006; 52°30′20″N 2°44′18″W	1383306	Church of St Edith More images
Church of St Mary	Ellesmere	Church	Norman	19 March 1951	SJ4028034826; 52°54′27″N 2°53′22″W	1055505	Church of St Mary More images
Church of Saint Andrew	Great Ness	Church	13th century	27 May 1953	SJ3976119033; 52°45′56″N 2°53′39″W	1295352	Church of Saint Andrew More images
Heath Chapel	Heath	Church	12th century	12 November 1954	SO5573085621; 52°28′00″N 2°39′11″W	1383722	Heath Chapel More images
Church of St Luke	Hodnet	Church	1673	10 February 1959	SJ6124128600; 52°51′13″N 2°34′37″W	1366827	Church of St Luke More images
Hawkestone Hall	Hodnet	House	c. 1700	10 February 1959	SJ5813829930; 52°51′55″N 2°37′24″W	1055335	Hawkestone Hall More images
Church of St John the Baptist	Hope Bagot	Church	12th century	12 November 1954	SO5887974060; 52°21′47″N 2°36′19″W	1383523	Church of St John the Baptist More images
Church of St Mary	Hopesay	Church	Mid 19th century	28 May 1987	SO3892683279; 52°26′39″N 2°54′00″W	1054961	Church of St Mary More images
Hopton Castle, Remains of	Hopton Castle	Castle	Early 14th century	1 December 1951	SO3669777938; 52°23′45″N 2°55′54″W	1054935	Hopton Castle, Remains of More images
Church of St John the Baptist	Hughley	Church	Late 17th century	11 June 1958	SO5648197935; 52°34′39″N 2°38′37″W	1366851	Church of St John the Baptist More images
Church of St John the Baptist	Kinlet	Church	12th century	9 March 1970	SO7106681032; 52°25′35″N 2°25′37″W	1053830	Church of St John the Baptist More images
Kinlet Hall (including Office Wings and Stables)	Kinlet	House	1729	29 November 1951	SO7083481182; 52°25′40″N 2°25′49″W	1053832	Kinlet Hall (including Office Wings and Stables) More images
Adcote and Adjoining Forecourt Walls	Little Ness	House	1876-1881	2 July 1971	SJ4184719391; 52°46′08″N 2°51′48″W	1055113	Adcote and Adjoining Forecourt Walls More images
Church of St Michael	Llanyblodwel	Church	12th century	8 October 1959	SJ2393822891; 52°47′54″N 3°07′46″W	1307719	Church of St Michael More images
Church of St Mary	Longnor	Church	Early 18th century	13 June 1958	SJ4880500492; 52°35′59″N 2°45′26″W	1055588	Church of St Mary More images
Longnor Hall	Longnor	House	1670	29 January 1952	SJ4859400504; 52°36′00″N 2°45′37″W	1366693	Longnor Hall More images
Church of St Michael	Loppington	Church	14th century	28 October 1960	SJ4716229276; 52°51′30″N 2°47′10″W	1056050	Church of St Michael More images
Ludford Bridge	Ludford	Bridge	15th century	12 November 1954	SO5125774210; 52°21′50″N 2°43′02″W	1281983	Ludford Bridge More images
Broad Gate, including Broadgate Chambers and Attached Railings	Ludlow	House	C16-C18	15 April 1954	SO5120474380; 52°21′55″N 2°43′05″W	1282001	Broad Gate, including Broadgate Chambers and Attached Railings More images
Castle House Flats	Ludlow	Apartments	1954	15 April 1954	SO5092774627; 52°22′03″N 2°43′20″W	1202824	Castle House Flats More images
Church of St Laurence and Attached Railings	Ludlow	Church	13th century	15 April 1954	SO5116074712; 52°22′06″N 2°43′07″W	1202794	Church of St Laurence and Attached Railings More images
Feathers Hotel	Ludlow	House	Earlier Core	15 April 1954	SO5124874753; 52°22′07″N 2°43′03″W	1282026	Feathers Hotel More images
Butter Cross	Ludlow	Market Hall	c. 1746	15 April 1954	SO5113674657; 52°22′04″N 2°43′09″W	1289674	Butter Cross More images
Ludlow Castle	Ludlow	Castle	12th century	15 April 1954	SO5085774631; 52°22′03″N 2°43′23″W	1291698	Ludlow Castle More images
The Guildhall and Adjoining Coachhouse	Ludlow	House	1954	15 April 1954	SO5100674512; 52°21′59″N 2°43′15″W	1211188	The Guildhall and Adjoining Coachhouse More images
The Reader's House	Ludlow	House	c. 1616	15 April 1954	SO5119574733; 52°22′06″N 2°43′06″W	1220775	The Reader's House More images
Church of St Michael and All Angels	Lydbury North	Church	Early 12th century	21 March 1968	SO3521186019; 52°28′06″N 2°57′19″W	1054540	Church of St Michael and All Angels More images
Linley Hall	Linley, More	House	1742-48	1 December 1951	SO3461992893; 52°31′48″N 2°57′55″W	1054588	Linley Hall More images
Church of St Bartholomew	Moreton Corbet, Moreton Corbet and Lee Brockhurst	Church	12th century	28 October 1960	SJ5611523240; 52°48′18″N 2°39′09″W	1307235	Church of St Bartholomew More images
Moreton Corbet Castle	Moreton Corbet, Moreton Corbet and Lee Brockhurst	Castle	c. 1200	28 October 1960	SJ5612523131; 52°48′14″N 2°39′08″W	1366802	Moreton Corbet Castle More images
The Old Manor House (Preston Hall)	Preston Brockhurst, Moreton Corbet and Lee Brockhurst	House	c. 1650	28 October 1960	SJ5365124606; 52°49′01″N 2°41′21″W	1178096	The Old Manor House (Preston Hall) More images
Church of St Gregory	Morville	Church	Early Norman	9 March 1970	SO6696093896; 52°32′31″N 2°29′19″W	1053840	Church of St Gregory More images
Morville Hall	Morville	House	16th century	29 November 1951	SO6684293996; 52°32′34″N 2°29′25″W	1053841	Morville Hall More images
Church of Holy Trinity	Much Wenlock	Church	Norman	24 October 1950	SO6236699994; 52°35′47″N 2°33′25″W	1053793	Church of Holy Trinity More images
Priory House	Much Wenlock	House	Dissolution of the Monasteries	24 October 1950	SJ6251500022; 52°35′48″N 2°33′17″W	1053843	Priory House More images
Priory of St Milburga (ruins)	Much Wenlock	Chapter House	12th century	24 October 1950	SJ6248600060; 52°35′49″N 2°33′19″W	1294473	Priory of St Milburga (ruins) More images
Church of St Michael	Munslow	Church	12th century	12 November 1954	SO5211287720; 52°29′07″N 2°42′24″W	1383331	Church of St Michael More images
Llwyd Mansion	Oswestry	House	Mid to late 15th century	10 September 1951	SJ2907229620; 52°51′34″N 3°03′18″W	1054299	Llwyd Mansion More images
Church of St Michael	Pitchford	Church	12th century	13 June 1958	SJ5275404286; 52°38′03″N 2°41′58″W	1177813	Church of St Michael More images
Pitchford Hall	Pitchford	House	14th century or 15th century	29 January 1952	SJ5278204237; 52°38′02″N 2°41′57″W	1177907	Pitchford Hall More images
Barn Approximately 20m South West of Bank Farmhouse	Pontesbury	Barn	17th century	10 March 1986	SJ3867604016; 52°37′50″N 2°54′27″W	1366665	Upload Photo
Church of All Saints	Richard's Castle	Church	1892	28 October 1969	SO4943170658; 52°19′54″N 2°44′37″W	1383775	Church of All Saints More images
Langley Chapel	Langley, Ruckley and Langley	Chapel	c. 1564	13 June 1958	SJ5383900091; 52°35′48″N 2°40′59″W	1052167	Langley Chapel More images
Wilderhope Manor	Rushbury	Manor house	Late 16th century	12 November 1954	SO5452792879; 52°31′55″N 2°40′18″W	1383384	Wilderhope Manor More images
Church of St Mary	Selattyn, Selattyn and Gobowen	Church	13th century	8 October 1959	SJ2663934026; 52°53′55″N 3°05′31″W	1367376	Church of St Mary More images
Church of St Mary the Virgin	Shawbury	Church	Late 12th century	28 October 1960	SJ5591821177; 52°47′11″N 2°39′18″W	1055376	Church of St Mary the Virgin More images
Chest Tomb Approximately 1 Metre to South of South Chapel of Church of St Andrew	Shifnal	Chest tomb	Late 18th century	29 August 1984	SJ7470207478; 52°39′52″N 2°22′32″W	1053624	Chest Tomb Approximately 1 Metre to South of South Chapel of Church of St Andrew
Church of St Andrew	Shifnal	Church	12th century	26 May 1955	SJ7468807491; 52°39′52″N 2°22′33″W	1367657	Church of St Andrew More images
Shipton Hall	Shipton	House	About 1549	29 November 1951	SO5617491943; 52°31′25″N 2°38′51″W	1294246	Shipton Hall More images
Abbey Church of the Holy Cross	Shrewsbury	Abbey	Late C11-Early 12th century	10 January 1953	SJ4984412474; 52°42′27″N 2°44′38″W	1246392	Abbey Church of the Holy Cross More images
Church of St Chad	Shrewsbury	Church	1790-92	10 January 1953	SJ4881912431; 52°42′26″N 2°45′32″W	1344941	Church of St Chad More images
Church of St Mary	Shrewsbury	Church	12th century	10 January 1953	SJ4933612605; 52°42′31″N 2°45′05″W	1344964	Church of St Mary More images
Council House Gatehouse and Gateway	Shrewsbury	House	Early 16th century	10 January 1953	SJ4941112734; 52°42′36″N 2°45′01″W	1247157	Council House Gatehouse and Gateway More images
Former Ditherington Flax Mill and attached former Malting Kiln	Ditherington, Shrewsbury	Mill	1897-1898	10 January 1953	SJ4987413830; 52°43′11″N 2°44′37″W	1270576	Former Ditherington Flax Mill and attached former Malting Kiln More images
Library	Shrewsbury	Library	1595	10 January 1953	SJ4936512799; 52°42′38″N 2°45′03″W	1271288	Library More images
Old Market Hall	Shrewsbury	Court House	1596	10 January 1953	SJ4912412458; 52°42′27″N 2°45′16″W	1254925	Old Market Hall More images
Refectory Pulpit Approximately 40 Metres South of Abbey House	Shrewsbury	Refectory	14th century	10 January 1953	SJ4985212423; 52°42′26″N 2°44′37″W	1246393	Refectory Pulpit Approximately 40 Metres South of Abbey House More images
Shrewsbury Castle	Shrewsbury	Castle	1164-1300	10 January 1953	SJ4944012881; 52°42′40″N 2°44′59″W	1246877	Shrewsbury Castle More images
The Abbot's House	Shrewsbury	House	Late 15th century	10 January 1953	SJ4923112535; 52°42′29″N 2°45′10″W	1246543	The Abbot's House More images
The Lion Hotel	Shrewsbury	House	Late 15th century	10 January 1953	SJ4931412340; 52°42′23″N 2°45′06″W	1255164	The Lion Hotel More images
The Trotting Horse Building	Shrewsbury	House	Late 16th century	19 September 1972	SJ4933512319; 52°42′22″N 2°45′05″W	1246462	The Trotting Horse Building More images
71, 72 and 73 Wyle Cop	Shrewsbury	House	Mid 15th century	10 January 1953	SJ4934912329; 52°42′22″N 2°45′04″W	1255124	71, 72 and 73 Wyle Cop More images
Church of St Martin	St Martin's	Church	13th century	8 October 1959	SJ3225436305; 52°55′12″N 3°00′33″W	1367347	Church of St Martin More images
Church of St Peter	Stanton Lacy	Church	c. 1050	12 November 1954	SO4954978826; 52°24′18″N 2°44′35″W	1269832	Church of St Peter More images
Church of St Andrew	Stanton upon Hine Heath	Church	12th century	28 October 1960	SJ5680923790; 52°48′36″N 2°38′32″W	1188128	Church of St Andrew More images
Church of St Mary	Stottesdon	Church	Pre Conquest	9 March 1970	SO6724782886; 52°26′35″N 2°29′00″W	1189978	Church of St Mary More images
Church of St Bartholomew	Tong	Church	c. 1260	26 May 1955	SJ7956707386; 52°39′50″N 2°18′13″W	1053606	Church of St Bartholomew More images
Haughmond Abbey	Uffington	Abbey	1130	17 February 1985	SJ5417915119; 52°43′54″N 2°40′48″W	1052157	Haughmond Abbey More images
Former Church of St Michael	Upton Cressett	Church	Medieval	9 March 1970	SO6559892456; 52°31′44″N 2°30′31″W	1367566	Former Church of St Michael More images
Gatehouse at Upton Cressett Hall	Upton Cressett	Gatehouse	Elizabethan	29 November 1951	SO6558592407; 52°31′41″N 2°30′31″W	1053757	Gatehouse at Upton Cressett Hall
Upton Cressett Hall	Upton Cressett	House	Medieval	29 November 1951	SO6558492402; 52°31′42″N 2°30′31″W	1190045	Upton Cressett Hall More images
Church of St Mary	Edstaston, Wem Rural	Church	Late 12th century	28 October 1960	SJ5177031975; 52°52′59″N 2°43′05″W	1236691	Church of St Mary More images
The Obelisk, Hawkstone Park	Hawkstone Park, Weston-under-Redcastle	Column	1795	28 October 1960	SJ5790429222; 52°51′32″N 2°37′36″W	1264272	The Obelisk, Hawkstone Park More images
Church of Saint Alkmund	Whitchurch	Church	1089	1 May 1951	SJ5409641713; 52°58′15″N 2°41′06″W	1177510	Church of Saint Alkmund More images
Domestic Chapel Approximately 350 Metres South of Halston Hall	Whittington	Chapel	Early 16th century	8 October 1959	SJ3388331297; 52°52′30″N 2°59′02″W	1367397	Upload Photo
Halston Hall including attached Flanking Walls and Balustrade to Rear	Whittington	House	c. 1690	19 January 1952	SJ3392631653; 52°52′42″N 2°59′00″W	1054216	Halston Hall including attached Flanking Walls and Balustrade to Rear More images
Whittington Castle	Whittington	Castle	Late 11th century or 12th century	8 October 1959	SJ3261531148; 52°52′25″N 3°00′09″W	1178307	Whittington Castle More images
Whitton Court	Whitton	House	19th century	12 November 1954	SO5788373470; 52°21′28″N 2°37′11″W	1383591	Upload Photo
Davenport House	Worfield	House	1726	29 November 1951	SO7535795437; 52°33′22″N 2°21′54″W	1053732	Davenport House More images
Church of All Saints	Worthen, Worthen with Shelve	Church	Late 12th century	21 March 1968	SJ3283504682; 52°38′09″N 2°59′38″W	1055014	Church of All Saints More images
Church of St Andrew	Wroxeter, Wroxeter and Uppington	Cross	17th century	13 June 1958	SJ5633008247; 52°40′13″N 2°38′50″W	1224008	Church of St Andrew More images

== Telford and Wrekin ==
Name	Location	Type	Completed	Date designated	Grid ref. Geo-coordinates	Entry number	Image
Church of St Peter	Edgmond	Sundial	18th century	18 June 1959	SJ7202719288; 52°46′14″N 2°24′58″W	1054183	Church of St Peter More images
Church of St Michael and Remains of Churchyard Cross	High Ercall, Ercall Magna	Church & Cross	Early Medieval	18 June 1959	SJ5946417351; 52°45′08″N 2°36′07″W	1038604	Church of St Michael and Remains of Churchyard Cross More images
Remains of Lilleshall Abbey	Lilleshall, Lilleshall and Donnington	Abbey	12th century	18 June 1959	SJ7376514208; 52°43′30″N 2°23′24″W	1293216	Remains of Lilleshall Abbey More images
Abbey Wall South East of Lilleshall Abbey	Lilleshall, Lilleshall and Donnington	Abbey	Medieval	8 April 1983	SJ7386114037; 52°43′24″N 2°23′18″W	1038252	Upload Photo
Church of St Michael and All Angels	Lilleshall, Lilleshall and Donnington	Church	Late Norman	18 June 1959	SJ7286715285; 52°44′04″N 2°24′12″W	1038247	Church of St Michael and All Angels More images
Gatehouse South West of Madeley Court	Madeley	Gatehouse	Late 16th century or Early 17th century	8 April 1983	SJ6953405113; 52°38′34″N 2°27′06″W	1292950	Gatehouse South West of Madeley Court More images
Preston Hospital including Screen and Gates in front	Preston upon the Weald Moors	Hospital	18th century	4 January 1952	SJ6790015326; 52°44′05″N 2°28′37″W	1292617	Preston Hospital including Screen and Gates in front More images
Longdon Aqueduct (aqueduct on the Shrewsbury Canal)	Shrewsbury Canal, Rodington	Aqueduct	Pre 1795	30 March 1971	SJ6175515640; 52°44′13″N 2°34′04″W	1037006	Longdon Aqueduct (aqueduct on the Shrewsbury Canal) More images
Church of St James	Stirchley, Stirchley and Brookside	Church	12th century	8 April 1983	SJ6998306720; 52°39′27″N 2°26′43″W	1352002	Church of St James More images
The Iron Bridge	Ironbridge, The Gorge	Footbridge	1779	8 April 1983	SJ6723803396; 52°37′38″N 2°29′08″W	1038659	The Iron Bridge More images
The Old Furnace at Coalbrookdale Ironworks	Coalbrookdale, The Gorge	Blast Furnace	1638	8 April 1983	SJ6675504879; 52°38′26″N 2°29′34″W	1054135	The Old Furnace at Coalbrookdale Ironworks More images
Church of St Peter	Wrockwardine	Church	12th century	18 June 1959	SJ6245812051; 52°42′17″N 2°33′25″W	1030939	Church of St Peter More images

== See also ==
- Grade I listed churches in Shropshire
- Category:Grade I listed buildings in Shropshire
