= Grade I listed churches in Shropshire =

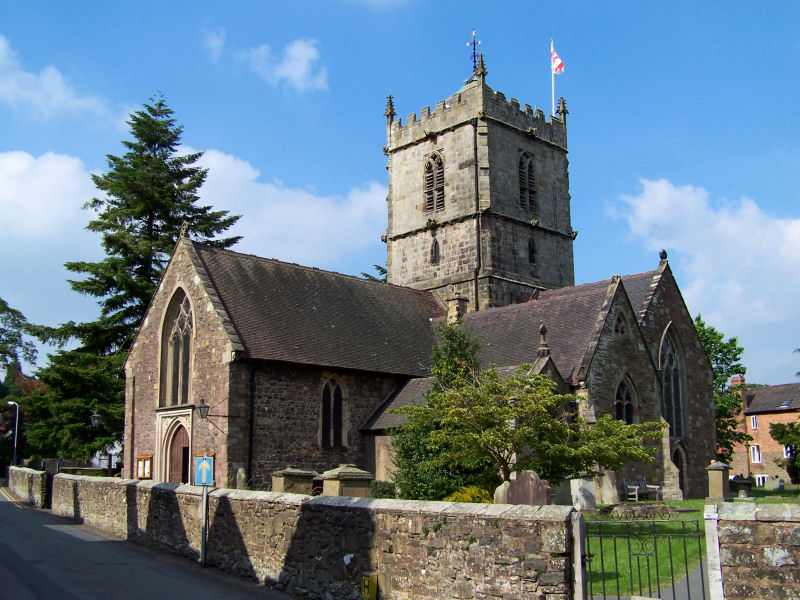
St Laurence's Church, Church Stretton

Shropshire is a county in the West Midlands region of England. In 2009, the historic county was divided into two unitary authorities, Shropshire and Telford and Wrekin. These two unitary authorities constitute the ceremonial county of Shropshire, which forms the basis for this list. The county's economy is largely agricultural. Until the creation of the new town of Telford in the 1960s, the largest town was its county town, Shrewsbury. Shropshire is the largest entirely inland county in England. Its churches are mainly constructed from local stone. This is mainly sandstone, although there are limestone deposits in the northeast of the county. The Triassic sandstone from quarries at Grinshill is considered to be one of the finest types of stone in the county for building.

Christian churches have been present in Shropshire since the Anglo-Saxon era. Very few churches have retained Saxon features surviving from this period, the best example being St Giles, Barrow. Surviving Norman architecture is found more frequently; churches containing significant Norman features include St John the Baptist, Hope Bagot, St Edith, Eaton-under-Heywood, St Michael and All Angels, Lilleshall, and St Laurence, Church Stretton. Otherwise, most of the churches in this list are in Gothic style, dating between the 13th and the 17th centuries. There are three examples of churches from later periods, namely the Neoclassical Church of St Chad, Shrewsbury (1790–92), the idiosyncratic Church of St Michael, Llanyblodwel (1846–56), and Richard Norman Shaw's Church of All Saints, Richard's Castle (1890–92).

This list contains all the Grade-I listed churches and chapels in the ceremonial county of Shropshire recorded in the National Heritage List for England. Buildings are listed on the recommendation of English Heritage to the Secretary of State for Culture, Media and Sport, who makes the decision whether or not to list the building. Grade-I listed buildings are defined as being of "exceptional interest, sometimes considered to be internationally important". Only 2.5% of listed buildings are included in this grade.

== Churches ==
Name	Location	Photograph	Notes
St Mary	Acton Burnell; 52.6131°N 2.6903°W		St Mary's stands close to the ruins of Acton Burnell Castle. It was built between 1250 and 1280 for Robert Burnell. A small tower was added in the angle between the chancel and the north transept when the church was restored in 1887–89 by Fairfax B. Wade. It has a cruciform plan, and its contents are described as being "ornate".
St Peter	Adderley; 52.9522°N 2.5059°W		The north transept was built in 1635–36 as a burial chamber, and the tower dates from 1712. The rest of the church was built in 1891 by Richard Baker, and is his only known work. The chancel was restored in 1822. During the 20th century the church was divided. The nave and tower are used as an active parish church, while the chancel and transepts are under the care of the Churches Conservation Trust.
St Eata	Atcham; 52.6785°N 2.6804°W		This church has a unique dedication to Saint Eata, and was in existence by 1075. It is constructed in red sandstone, and incorporates some re-used material from the Roman city at Wroxeter. The tower dates from about 1300, with its top stage being added in the late 15th or early 16th century. The south porch is dated 1684, and the church was restored in the late 19th century.
St Giles	Barrow; 52.5965°N 2.5065°W		St Giles' is one of the most complete surviving early churches in the county, and contains its only Saxon chancel. The date of origin has been suggested to be as early as the 8th century, but it is more likely to date from the 11th century. The church has Norman architectural elements in the nave and the tower, although the upper stage of the tower dates from the 18th century. The south porch was added in 1705. In 1851–52 a restoration was carried out by G. E. Street, and a north chapel was added in 1894–95 by Ewan Christian.
All Saints	Berrington; 52.6574°N 2.6956°W		All Saints originated in the 13th century, with additions and alterations during the following two centuries. It was restored in 1877 by Edward Haycock junior, when the south porch was rebuilt. It is constructed in sandstone with tiled roofs. The font is Norman, and is set on the base of a Roman column.
St Mary the Virgin	Bromfield; 52.3868°N 2.7625°W		This is the church of a Benedictine priory established in 1155, although it was in existence before this date. The present church retains parts of the nave, crossing and north transept of that church. In 1658 the crossing was converted into the chancel. The church was restored in 1889–90 by C. Hodgson Fowler, who added windows in Decorated style, and a north vestry. Among its features is the painted ceiling of the chancel executed in 1672 by Thomas Francis.
St Mary	Burford; 52.3088°N 2.6126°W		The chancel dates from the 12th century and contains some Norman fabric. The nave and tower are from the 14th century, the nave being in Decorated style, and the tower Perpendicular. A north vestry was added in about 1860. The church was restored in 1889–90 by Aston Webb; this included considerable rebuilding of the tower, and replacing the chancel arch and roof, and the tracery in the windows. The church contains an important series of family monuments.
St James	Cardington; 52.5519°N 2.7295°W		The nave dates from the 12th century and is in Norman style. It was lengthened later that century, and during the following century the chancel was rebuilt. The tower also dates from the 13th century. It is in Early English style, and its top stage was added in the 14th century. The timber porch was built in 1639. The church was restored between 1863 and 1869; this included the replacement of the Norman chancel arch with a much wider arch.
St Peter	Chelmarsh; 52.4878°N 2.4130°W		The body of the church, and the two lower stages of the tower, date from the 14th century. A chantry chapel was consecrated in 1345. The tower was completed in the 18th century, and the south porch was added in 1887. A Norman doorway is reset in the north wall. The east window contains stained glass dated 1893 by Kempe depicting the Crucifixion.
St Michael	Chirbury; 52.5794°N 3.0915°W		The church dates from the 12th century, or earlier. During the 13th century it became an Augustinian priory church. Of this church, the nave, aisles, and west tower remain, with a short chancel added in 1733. The church was restored in 1871–72 by Edward Haycock junior. The tower and body of the church are constructed in limestone rubble with pink sandstone ashlar dressings and slate roofs; the chancel is in red brick with a tiled roof.
St Laurence	Church Stretton; 52.5382°N 2.8088°W		Having a cruciform plan, the nave is Norman, dating from the 12th century. The rest of the church is Early English, from the 13th century, other than the top stage of the tower, which is 15th-century Perpendicular in style. The south vestry was added in 1831, and the church was restored in 1867–68 by S. Pountney Smith, who added west aisles to the transepts. There were further restorations in 1882 and 1932.
All Saints	Claverley; 52.5383°N 2.3072°W		All Saints was founded by Roger de Montgomerie, 1st Earl of Shrewsbury, and still contains Norman arches and windows. Its tower was raised in height at the end of the 15th century, and its top two stages were rebuilt in 1902 by W. Wood Bethell. Otherwise the church is in Decorated and Perpendicular styles. The font is Norman, and in the church are monuments dated between 1448 and 1599.
St Mary	Cleobury Mortimer; 52.3792°N 2.4803°W		The base of the tower dates from the 12th century, and the body of the church from the following century. In the later part of the 13th century the aisles, the south porch, and a chantry chapel were added. A shingled broach spire was added to the tower, possibly in the 14th century; this has developed a noticeable twist. A vestry was built during the 15th century. The church was repaired in 1793 by Thomas Telford, and restored in 1874–75 by George Gilbert Scott.
St Swithun	Clunbury; 52.4202°N 2.9265°W		Originating as a chapel of ease to St George, Clun, the church acquired parochial status in 1341. It was built in the 12th century, and retains some Norman features. Alterations and additions were made in the 14th and 15th centuries, with more in the 19th century. In 1881 the church was restored by James Piers St Aubyn, including the addition of a timber-framed south porch.
St Peter	Cound; 52.6409°N 2.6543°W		The earliest surviving part of the church is the nave, which dates from the 13th century. The 13th-century south aisle was rebuilt during the following century, and the west tower was built in the 15th century. In 1842 the north aisle was built by S. Pountney Smith, and in 1862 the same architect added the chancel. The north vestry was added in 1889–91 by Paley and Austin. The church is constructed in sandstone of varying colours.
St Edith	Eaton-under-Heywood; 52.5057°N 2.7383°W		The nave is Norman, dating from the 12th century. The chancel and tower date from the following century. There were alterations and additions in the 14th and 15th centuries. In 1869 the church was restored by W. J. Hopkins. It is constructed in stone rubble with ashlar dressings, and has a tiled roof.
St Peter	Edgmond; 52.7705°N 2.4161°W		A church was in existence on the site by 1122, and it was enlarged in the 13th century. The present church dates mainly from the 14th and 15th centuries. It was restored in 1877–78 by G. E. Street. From the southeast, its appearance is mainly that of a Perpendicular church.
St Mary	Edstaston; 52.8832°N 2.7181°W		St Mary's was built in the 12th century as a chapel of ease to St Peter and St Paul, Wem, and became a parish in its own right in 1850. The east end of the church was remodelled in the early 14th century, the south porch was added in 1710, the west end was shortened and rebuilt in about 1723, and the whole church was restored in 1882–83 by G. H. Birch. The architectural style of the church is Norman, and many Norman features have been retained, including three doorways, and two windows on the north side, although three Perpendicular windows have been inserted in the south wall.
St Mary	Ellesmere; 52.9075°N 2.8895°W		St Mary's originally had a Norman nave, Early English transepts and crossing, and a tower dating from between 1439 and 1449. In 1848–49 George Gilbert Scott rebuilt the nave in Perpendicular style, and restored the transepts, adding a stair turret. Arthur Blomfield restored the chancel chapel in 1883, and in 1889 John Loughborough Pearson rebuilt the east wall of the chancel.
St Andrew	Great Ness; 52.7655°N 2.8943°W		The church originated as an Anglo-Saxon collegiate church. The nave and the lower part of the tower of the present church date from the 13th century, and the chancel from the early part of the following century. The top stage of the tower was either rebuilt or added in the 17th century. In 1852 the chancel was re-roofed, and the church was partly restored in 1880. The church is constructed in sandstone, the nave having a tiled roof, and the roof of the chancel being slated.
Heath Chapel	Heath; 52.4667°N 2.6531°W		This is a small Norman chapel that has been substantially unchanged since it was built in the 12th century. It consists of a nave and a chancel without a bellcote. It has a south doorway and very small windows. Inside is a Norman font, furnishings many of which date probably from the 17th century, and traces of wall paintings.
St Michael	High Ercall; 52.7522°N 2.6021°W		The nave and its aisles date from the late 12th century, with the chancel and a north chapel added in the 14th century. The west tower is Perpendicular in style. The church was damaged in the Civil War, and was repaired between 1657 and 1662. In 1864 the church was restored by G. E. Street who added a south porch and a vestry. The listing includes the remains of a medieval churchyard cross.
St Luke	Hodnet; 52.8535°N 2.5770°W		St Luke's dates from the 12th century, its nave now being the south aisle. A very wide aisle was added to its north side in the early 14th century, together with an east chapel and the tower. The aisle and chapel were reconstructed in 1846–47, and a vestry was added. A north chapel was built in 1870, and in 1883 the church was further restored. The tower is placed at the west end of the nave, and is unique in England in that it is octagonal throughout its full height.
Holy Trinity	Holdgate; 52.5025°N 2.6472°W		The nave, dating from the 12th century, is in Norman style, and incorporates a richly decorated south doorway. The chancel and the lower part of the tower date from the following century, with the top stage of the tower being added in the 15th century. Work was carried on in the church by St Aubyn and Wadling in 1894–95, which included rebuilding the chancel arch, the porch and the roofs.
St John the Baptist	Hope Bagot; 52.3630°N 2.6053°W		This church dates from the 12th century, and retains many Norman features, including the whole of the north side of the church, the south doorway, and the chancel arch. Alterations and additions were made in the 13th, 14th and 17th centuries. There was a restoration in 1868, and a further restoration by W. D. Caroe in 1911. The church has a low west tower with a pyramidal roof.
St Mary	Hopesay; 52.4441°N 2.8999°W		St Mary's dates from the late 12th and the early 13th centuries, and was restored in about 1880. It has a broad west tower with slits for windows, a roof consisting of a truncated pyramid, surmounted by a low bell stage with a pyramidal roof. It is constructed in limestone rubble with ashlar dressings, and has a tiled roof.
St John the Baptist	Hughley; 52.5775°N 2.6436°W		This small church consists of a nave and chancel in one range, which was built in the 13th century. It originated as a chapel of ease to Holy Trinity, Much Wenlock, becoming a parish church in its own right in the later part of the 14th century. A timber bellcote was added at the west end of the church in 1700. The church was restored in 1871–72 by Richard Norman Shaw, which included enrichment of the roof. Inside the church is a 15th-century chancel screen that is considered to be the finest in the county.
St John the Baptist	Kinlet; 52.4265°N 2.4269°W		The core of the church dates from the 12th century, with the north aisle added in the later part of the century. The tower and the south aisle date from the next century, the chancel being rebuilt and the transepts added in about 1320. The upper part of the tower and the timber-framed clerestory are from about 1500. In 1893–94 the church was restored by John Oldrid Scott. The church contains fine monuments dating from the 15th to the early 19th centuries.
Langley Chapel	Langley; 52.5967°N 2.6830°W		The chapel was built in about 1564 on the site of an earlier chapel. It was re-roofed in 1601, and restored in 1900 by the Society for the Protection of Ancient Buildings. It has a simple structure consisting of a nave and chancel in one unit, and a west bellcote. The interior retains its 17th-century arrangement of furnishings. The chapel is no longer active, and is under the care of English Heritage.
St Michael and All Angels	Lilleshall; 52.7345°N 2.4032°W		The nave, with its two south doorways, is Late Norman in style. The north aisle and chapel were added in the 14th century in Decorated style, when the Early English chancel was lengthened and restored. The west tower is in Perpendicular style. The church was restored in 1856 by John Norton, including replacement of its south wall.
St Leonard	Linley; 52.5834°N 2.4639°W		Originally a chapel of ease to Holy Trinity, Much Wenlock, it was built in the 12th century, with the tower added later in that century. Its architectural style is almost all Norman, and it has a simple plan, consisting of a nave, a chancel, and a west tower. The church was restored by Arthur Blomfield in 1858. It is constructed in local sandstone, and has tiled roofs.
St Michael	Llanyblodwel; 52.7982°N 3.1295°W		The church was largely rebuilt in an idiosyncratic form by its vicar, Revd John Parker, between 1846 and 1856, incorporating medieval fabric from the older church. The west steeple is almost separate from the body of the church; it has an octagonal base that rises with little interruption into the spire. The body of the church has a Norman doorway in the south wall, and dormer windows along its north and south sides. Inside the church are numerous painted texts and stencilled patterns.
St Mary	Longnor; 52.5998°N 2.7572°W		This was originally a manorial chapel, and later a parish church. It was built in about 1260–80, with alterations and additions in the early 18th century. A west doorway and an external staircase to the gallery date from about 1840, and the bellcote from the late 19th century. It has survived as a largely unaltered 13th-century chapel, with largely complete 18th-century fittings.
St Michael	Loppington; 52.8584°N 2.7862°W		St Michael's dates from the 14th and late 15th centuries. It was partly rebuilt in the middle of the 17th century, and again in the early 18th century. J. L. Randal restored the church In 1869–70. During the Civil War while Parliamentarian troops were garrisoned in the church in 1643, Royalists caused much damage to it, including burning the roof.
St Laurence	Ludlow; 52.3682°N 2.7186°W		The largest parish church in the county, most of it dates from the 15th century, although 13th and 14th-century fragments are still present. The body of the church was restored in 1859–60 by George Gilbert Scott, and the tower was restored by Arthur Blomfield in 1889–91. The architectural style is mainly Perpendicular. Its plan includes a tower at the crossing, and chapels to the north and south of the chancel.
St Michael and All Angels	Lydbury North; 52.4684°N 2.9551°W		Dating from the 12th century, alterations were made in the 14th, 15th and 17th centuries. The main part of the church was restored in 1901–02 and the chancel in 1908, each time by J. T. Micklethwaite. The church has a cruciform plan, with a west tower, a south porch and a two-storey south transept. It is constructed in limestone rubble with much pebbledashing, red sandstone dressings, and stone slate roofs.
St Bartholomew	Moreton Corbet; 52.8050°N 2.6524°W		Standing to the north of the ruins of Moreton Corbet Castle, the church has a nave and chancel dating from the 12th century, and a large south aisle that was added in about 1330–40. The west tower was being built in 1539, its top stage being either added or rebuilt in 1769. The east wall of the chancel was rebuilt in 1778, and the whole church was restored in 1883. Features of the church include the large west window in the shape of a spherical triangle, and the squire's pew which was installed in about 1691.
St Gregory	Morville; 52.5419°N 2.4886°W		This was a collegiate church dating from 1118, and it contains much Norman architecture. At a later date the aisles were added and the chancel extended. In 1856 the clerestory was added to the nave. The east window by Thomas Gordon dates from 1880.
Holy Trinity	Much Wenlock; 52.5965°N 2.5571°W		The chancel and nave are Norman and the west tower is Transitional. The south aisle and chapel were added in the late 12th century, and there were further additions in the 13th century. Alterations were made to the south aisle in 1843, and to the south chapel in 1866, both by Pountney Smith, and there were further alterations to the chapel in 1877 by Philip Webb.
St Michael	Munslow; 52.4853°N 2.7067°W		The oldest fabric in the church, dating from the 12th century, is in the nave. The tower was added later in that century. The chancel dates from the 13th century, and there were further alterations in the following century, including the addition of the north aisle. The church was restored in 1868–70 by Pountney Smith, who stripped the internal walls of plaster.
St Michael	Pitchford; 52.6343°N 2.6995°W		This church dates from the 12th century, and was remodelled during the following century. The east wall of the chancel was rebuilt in 1719, a vestry was added in 1819, and the whole church was restored in 1910. It has a simple plan, consisting of a nave and chancel, and a weatherboarded bellcote on the west gable. It contains memorials dating between 1285 and 1589.
All Saints	Richard's Castle; 52.3317°N 2.7436°W		All Saints was built in 1890–92, and designed by Richard Norman Shaw as a personal commission. It is constructed in Grinshill sandstone with tiled roofs. Its plan consists of a nave with a south aisle and a north porch, a chancel with north and south vestries, and a large southwest tower incorporating a south porch. The style is mainly Decorated, with some Perpendicular features. Most of the internal fittings and furniture were designed by Shaw.
St Martin	St Martin's; 52.9199°N 3.0090°W		The church originated in the 13th century, and the north aisle was added in the late 14th or early 15th century. The tower followed in about 1632, and the northeast vestry in 1810. The church was restored in 1841, when a dormer window was added on the south side. The east wall of the chancel was rebuilt in 1862 when a window containing Decorated tracery was installed. The church is constructed in sandstone with slate roofs.
St Mary	Selattyn; 52.8987°N 3.0920°W		The nave and chancel are in one range, and date from the 13th century. The tower dates from 1703 to 1704, the north transept was added in 1821, and the south transept in 1828. The church was restored in 1892 by C. Hodgson Fowler, who also added the north aisle, a timber-framed south porch, and an arcade between the nave and the aisle. He shorted the south transept, adding an arcade between it and the nave, and installed new windows.
St Mary the Virgin	Shawbury; 52.7864°N 2.6550°W		The nave and south aisle date from the late 12th century, and are Norman in style. The chancel dates from the 13th century, and the north aisle was rebuilt in the 15th century; the north chapel and the tower also date from this century. The north porch, with its rusticated walls and pilasters, dates from either the 17th or 18th century. The church was restored in 1603, and again in 1875, the latter restoration being by Oliver Jones.
St Andrew	Shifnal; 52.6645°N 2.3757°W		St Andrew's is a cruciform church with a central tower. It originated as a collegiate church in the 12th century, and it still retains some Norman architectural features. Alterations and additions were made to it during the following three centuries. The church needed repairs following damage caused by the fire that occurred in the town in 1591. It was restored by George Gilbert Scott in 1876–79, and the north vestry was added in 1899–1900 by W. D. Caroe. The church is constructed in sandstone with tiled roofs.
Holy Cross	Shrewsbury; 52.7076°N 2.7438°W		This consists basically of the nave of the former church of Shrewsbury Abbey. Following the Dissolution of the Monasteries the choir, the transepts, and the crossing were demolished, the nave becoming a parish church. It was restored in 1861–63 by Samuel Pountney Smith, and in 1886–67 by John Loughborough Pearson who added north and south chapels and a chancel. It is constructed in red sandstone, and contains some Norman features, although most of the church is Gothic or Gothic Revival.
St Chad	Shrewsbury; 52.7074°N 2.7590°W		St Chad's is a Neoclassical church built in 1790–92 to a design by George Steuart. Its principal features are its circular nave and its tower. A portico leads through the base of the tower which is flanked by vestries, through a link for stairs to the galleries, into the nave that has a diameter of 100 feet (30 m). The tower has a rectangular lower stage above which is an octagonal stage with bell openings. This is surmounted by a circular stage with columns carrying an entablature and a cupola.
St Mary	Shrewsbury; 52.7087°N 2.7513°W		This originated as a collegiate church in the 10th century. Building of the present church started in the 12th century, which was followed by the addition of the tower, and in the 1170s by the aisles. Further alterations and additions were made, including building the Trinity Chapel in the 14th century. The church was restored by Thomas Telford in about 1792, alterations were made by S. Pountney Smith between 1858 and 1870, and in 1884 Paley and Austin added a north vestry. Part of the spire fell in 1894, and repairs were carried out by John Oldrid Scott. The church is now redundant and is vested in the Churches Conservation Trust.
St Peter	Stanton Lacy; 52.4051°N 2.7431°W		St Peter's is a cruciform church dating from the 11th century, and retaining Anglo-Saxon and Norman features. The chancel dates from the 13th century, and the south transept, south aisle, and the crossing tower were added in the early 14th century. The church was restored in 1847–49 by T. H. Wyatt who added the east window and the north vestry. It is constructed in sandstone with tiled roofs.
St Andrew	Stanton upon Hine Heath; 52.8099°N 2.6421°W		The chancel and nave are early Norman, dating from the 12th century. The tower dates from the 13th century, with the bell stage added during the later part of the following century. The south aisle is from the late 13th or 14th century, and the north porch is dated 1595. The east end of the chancel was rebuilt in 1740, and the church was restored in 1891–92. It is constructed in sandstone with tiled roofs.
St James	Stirchley; 52.6573°N 2.4452°W		The chancel, together with its arch, is Norman, dating from the 12th century. In about 1740 the nave and tower of the church were encased in brick, and the height of the tower was raised. A north aisle was added in 1838. The church is now redundant and is vested in the Churches Conservation Trust.
St John the Baptist	Stokesay; 52.4307°N 2.8312°W		The church stands to the north of Stokesay Castle. It originated in the 12th century, but was badly damaged in the Civil War, and largely rebuilt following that. The nave was built in 1654, and the chancel in 1664. The church has retained a re-assembled Norman doorway, an almost complete set of furnishings dating from the 1660s, and wall paintings of 1683. It is considered to be a rare example of a surviving church from the Commonwealth period.
St Mary	Stottesdon; 52.4430°N 2.4833°W		The church is recorded in the Domesday Book, and there is evidence of Saxon architecture in the west wall of the nave. The nave with its aisles is late Norman, dating from about 1180. The chancel and most of the rest of the church dates from about 1330. The church was restored in 1867–69 by Thomas Blashill, who rebuilt most of the wall of the north aisle and also built a new south arcade. The font dates from about 1160.
St Bartholomew	Tong; 52.6638°N 2.3036°W		The church originated in about 1260, and was largely rebuilt in about 1410 for Elizabeth de Pembruge. The Vernon chantry chapel (also known as the "Golden Chapel") was added in 1515–19, and the church was restored between 1889 and 1892 by Ewan Christian. It is constructed in local sandstone, and is in Perpendicular style. There is a central tower that is square at its base, then octagonal, and is surmounted by a short spire behind a battlemented parapet. Inside the church are numerous effigies and monuments dating from the early 15th to the late 18th centuries.
St Alkmund	Whitchurch; 52.9708°N 2.6849°W		The medieval church was destroyed when its tower fell, and it was replaced by the present church in 1712–13, the architect being John Barker. There were Victorian restorations in 1877–79 and 1885–85, internal alterations in 1894 and 1900–02, and the porch was rebuilt in 1925. Interred in the church are the remains of John Talbot, 1st Earl of Shrewsbury, who was killed at the Battle of Castillon in 1453.
Halston Hall Chapel	Whittington; 52.8751°N 2.9838°W	—	The private chapel for Halston Hall is a timber-framed building, with close studding and brick infill, dated by dendrochronology to 1437–38. It has a brick west tower dating from about 1725. The furnishings are practically unchanged since the early 18th century, and include a west gallery, box pews, and a reading pew with a two-decker pulpit.
All Saints	Worthen; 52.6358°N 2.9939°W		All Saints dates from the late 12th and the early 13th centuries, with the brick chancel added in 1761. It was restored in 1846–47, and again in 1924. Its plan consists of a nave with a south porch, a chancel with a southeast vestry, and a tower attached to the north side of the nave. Inside the church is a monument to Dr David Price, who died in 1633; Price was chaplain to Charles I.
St Peter	Wrockwardine; 52.7048°N 2.5570°W		The church dates mainly from the late 12th and early 13th century, and retains some Norman features. It has a cruciform plan with a tower at the crossing. A restoration was planned by Ewan Christian in 1854, and was executed by Richard Dodson. Further work was carried out in the church in the 1880s by S. Pountney Smith and William Bowdler.
St Andrew	Wroxeter; 52.6701°N 2.6472°W		The church contains Anglo-Saxon material, and incorporates fabric from the nearby Roman town. Alterations were made to it in the early 16th century, the south wall of the nave was rebuilt in 1773, and the church was restored in 1863. In 1889 the south porch was added. Part of an Anglo-Saxon cross shaft has been built into the south wall of the nave. Inside the church are traces of a wall painting. The church is now redundant and is under the care of the Churches Conservation Trust.

== See also ==
- Grade I listed buildings in Shropshire
