= Benthall Hall =

Country house in Shropshire, England

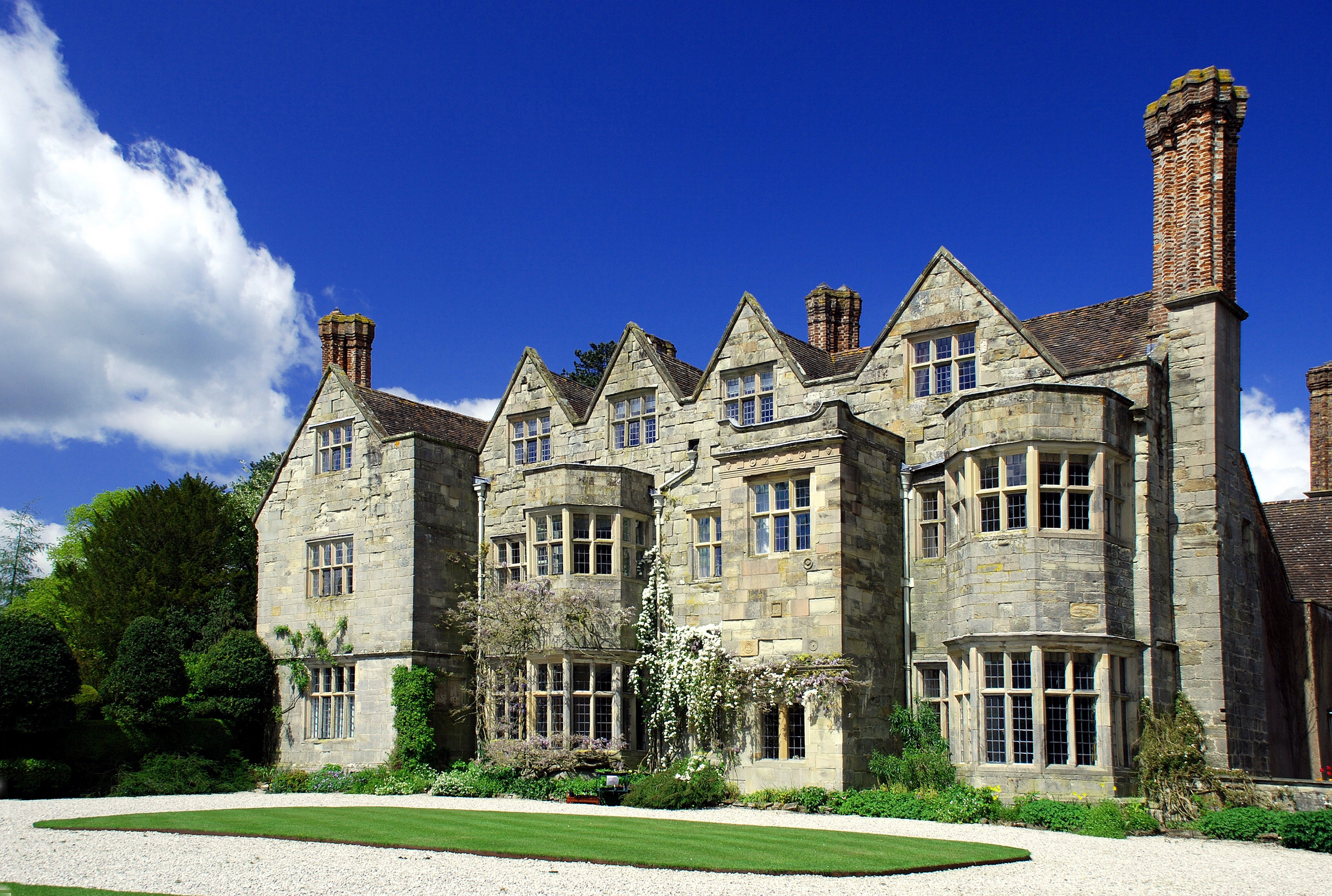
- Benthall Hall

- Location within Shropshire

General information
- Location: Benthall, Shropshire, England
- Coordinates: 52.6206°N 2.5067°W
- Completed: c.1580

Benthall Hall is a 16th-century English country house in Benthall in the town of Broseley, Shropshire, England, and a few miles from the historic Ironbridge Gorge. It retains much of its fine oak interior, and an elaborate 17th-century staircase. It is still occupied by the Benthall family, but has been owned by the National Trust since 1958, and is open to the public every Monday, Tuesday, Wednesday, Saturday, Sunday and Bank Holiday Monday (February – October).

The Hall was built around 1580, probably on the site of an earlier 12th-century medieval manor and manor house. During the Civil War it was garrisoned, and was a site of several skirmishes.

The garden is largely the product of two tenants. George Maw (1832–1912), local pottery manufacturer and crocus enthusiast developed the garden from around 1865 onwards. Subsequently, the Victorian era Romantic painter and sculptor Robert Bateman (1842–1922), who was the son of a famous horticulturalist, added the rockeries and terraces of the current garden.

The Restoration era church of St. Bartholomew, built 1667–68, stands close by the Hall. The Shropshire Way, a waymarked long-distance footpath, passes through the extensive woodland that lies to the north, between the estate and the River Severn.

In the film Enola Holmes, Benthall Hall was used for the exterior shots of the Holmes' family estate.

== See also ==
- Grade I listed buildings in Shropshire
- Listed buildings in Barrow, Shropshire
