= Listed buildings in Barrow, Shropshire =

Barrow is a civil parish in Shropshire, England. It contains 28 listed buildings that are recorded in the National Heritage List for England. Of these, three are listed at Grade I, the highest of the three grades, three are at Grade II*, the middle grade, and the others are at Grade II, the lowest grade. The parish contains the settlements of Barrow, Willey, Benthall, and Linley, and is otherwise completely rural. Four of the listed buildings are churches, two of which are at Grade I, and two at Grade II*. The other Grade I listed building is a country house. The rest of the listed buildings include farmhouses and farm buildings, other houses and cottages, a row of almshouses, a bridge, a chest tomb in a churchyard, and a war memorial.

== Key ==
Grade	Criteria
I	Buildings of exceptional interest, sometimes considered to be internationally important
II*	Particularly important buildings of more than special interest
II	Buildings of national importance and special interest

== Buildings ==
Name and location	Photograph	Date	Notes	Grade
St Giles' Church, Barrow; 52.59654°N 2.50649°W		11th century (probable)	The church contains the only Saxon chancel in the county, and the nave is Norman. The porch was built in 1705, and the tower was heightened during the 18th century. The church was restored in 1851–52 by G. E. Street, and in 1894–95 Ewan Christian made alterations. The top of the tower and the porch are in brick, the rest of the church is in stone, and the roofs are tiled. The church consists of a nave, a south porch, a chancel, and a west tower. The tower has three stages, a round-headed west doorway, and a pyramidal roof.	I
St Leonard's Church, Linley; 52.58344°N 2.46394°W		12th century	The church is almost completely Norman in style, it was restored in 1858 by Arthur Blomfield, but is now redundant. It is built in sandstone with freestone dressings and has a tile roof. The church consists of a nave, a lower and narrower chancel and a west tower. The tower has two stages, pilaster buttresses, corbel tables and a pyramidal roof with a weathervane. The doorways and most windows have round arches; the tympanum of the south door contains zigzag decoration, and that of the north door a carving.	I
St John's Church, Willey; 52.58959°N 2.48547°W		12th century	The tower was rebuilt in 1712, and in 1880 A. W. Blomfield added the aisles. The church is an estate church, built in sandstone with freestone dressings and a tile roof. It consists of a nave, north and south aisles incorporating an organ chamber, a chapel and a family pew, a lower chancel, and a west tower. The tower contains a porch with a round-headed doorway, it has three stages, diagonal buttresses, and an embattled parapet. In the south wall of the chancel are two Norman windows, and the east window has three lights and Decorated tracery.	II*
Little Dean Farm; 52.59745°N 2.47326°W	—	Mid 16th century	The farmhouse has two storeys, the ground floor in red brick and the upper floor in timber framing and brick. There is a tiled roof, and the right bay projects and is gabled. The door is recessed with a moulded surround, there is one 19th-century sash window, and one three-light casement window.	II
Benthall Hall; 52.62021°N 2.50653°W		Late 16th century	A country house in buff sandstone with two storeys and attics. On the front are five gables, the left gable the largest in a projecting bay. Also on the front are two-storey five-sided bay windows, and between them is a two-storey square porch with a door on the side. The windows are mullioned and transomed. At the rear is a stair tower and a service wing encasing an earlier timber framed building.	I
Little Posenhall Farm House; 52.61011°N 2.50924°W	—	Late 16th century	The farmhouse is in stone with a tile roof, and has a modern wing in brick. There are two storeys and attics. The windows are early 19th-century casements, and at the rear are two mullioned windows. On the front is a gabled porch.	II
The Croft; 52.62264°N 2.49064°W	—	Late 16th century	A stone house with a brick attic and a tiled roof. It has two storeys and an attic, and a gabled right wing. These are two three-light mullioned windows, and the other windows are modern casements. The doorcase is also modern.	II
The Marsh; 52.59329°N 2.53009°W		c. 1600	The remaining part of a larger house, it is in stone with quoins and a tile roof. There are two storeys with an attic, three bays, and a rear gabled wing at right angles. On the front is a round-headed doorway with a keyblock, and mullioned windows.	II
Church Row; 52.58970°N 2.48436°W		Late 16th to early 17th century	A two-storey house, the lower storey in stone, the upper storey in brick, with a single-storey stone wing to the left. The roofs are tiled. The main block contains a mullioned window and casement windows, and the wing has a doorway with a gabled hood on brackets.	II
Willey Old Hall; 52.58930°N 2.48468°W		Late 16th to 17th century	The Old Hall itself has been demolished, and what remains is this domestic range occupying two sides of a quadrangle. It is in stone, and has two storeys with attics, and four gabled bays, the third bay containing a carriage arch. The windows are mullioned, and in the attics are gabled dormers. To the north of the range is an octagonal brick tower with three storeys, sash windows, and a conical tiled roof.	II
Arlescott Farm House; 52.60386°N 2.51866°W		Early 17th century	The farmhouse is in red brick with a timber framed front covered in stucco. It has an L-shaped plan, and the doorways and windows are mainly modern.	II
Barrow House; 52.59628°N 2.50665°W		Early 17th century	The house contains early fabric, including ceiling beams and a chimney stack with diagonal brick shafts. Much of the rest of the house is later.	II
Hem Farm; 52.58116°N 2.45295°W	—	Early 17th century	A timber framed farmhouse with applied stucco. It has two storeys and an attic, and the doorway and windows are modern.	II
The Lodge Farm; 52.60407°N 2.49415°W		Early 17th century	A farmhouse in red brick with a tile roof. There are two storeys with an attic, and four bays. The windows are mullioned and transomed with segmental heads, and contain casements. The doorway is recessed and has a tiled hood, and there are gables on the front, the rear and the sides. Between the gables are parapets.	II
St Bartholomew's Church, Benthall; 52.61980°N 2.50690°W		1667–68	The vestry was added in 1884, and the porch and stair turret in 1893. The nave and chancel are rendered, the vestry is in siltstone, the porch and turret are in brick, and the roof is tiled. On the south side the former round-headed doorway in a projecting bay is blocked, and above it is a large square sundial, and a lion's head with its mouth acting as a bee bole. On the roof is a timber framed bellcote with a pyramidal roof and a weathervane.	II*
The Old Vicarage; 52.61459°N 2.49043°W	—	Late 17th century	A red brick house with moulded plastered eaves and a tile roof. It has three storeys and three bays. Semicircular steps lead up to a gabled porch with a keyblock over the entrance. The windows are casements with arched heads.	II
Willey Furnace Cottages; 52.60171°N 2.48296°W		c. 1760	Originally a warehouse, later two cottages, in red brick with tile roofs. They have two storeys and basements, with gables on each front. The doorways and windows have segmental heads, most with small-paned casements, and those in the ground floor with keyblocks.	II
Inett Farmhouse; 52.60086°N 2.45124°W	—	Late 18th century	The farmhouse is in red brick with a tile roof, and has three storeys and three bays. The central doorway has a pediment, and the windows are sashes. At the rear is a stair turret, and extension with one and two storeys.	II
Farmbuilding range, Inett Farm; 52.60131°N 2.45142°W	—	Late 18th century	Three ranges of farm buildings forming a U-shaped plan, in red brick with dentilled eaves, and tiled roofs, partly hipped. The left range has one storey and the other ranges have two. The openings include doors, windows, stable doors, round-headed arched shed entrances, and loft doors.	II
The Marsh Farm House; 52.59314°N 2.52984°W		Late 18th century	The farmhouse is in red brick with a band, dentilled eaves, and a hipped tile roof. There are three storeys and three bays. The doorway has a moulded surround with pilasters, a segmental fanlight, and a cornice hood. The windows are sashes with channelled lintels and keyblocks.	II
Barratt's Hill Farmhouse; 52.61532°N 2.48931°W	—	Late 18th to early 19th century	The farmhouse was extended later in the 19th century. It is in red brick with dentil eaves and a clay tile roof. There are two storeys, a T-Shaped plan, a front of three bays, with a one-bay extension to the left, and a rear wing with an outshut in the angle. The original three bays are symmetrical, there is a central doorway with a fanlight, sash windows in the ground floor and casement windows in the upper floor.	II
Willey Hall; 52.58968°N 2.49344°W	—	1813–20	A country house designed by Lewis Wyatt in Neoclassical style, it is built in sandstone with dentil eaves. There are two storeys and an entrance front of nine bays. In the centre is a large porte-cochère two bays deep, with four Corinthian columns carrying a pediment and a frieze carved with garlands and cornucopias, and in the other bays are pilasters. The southwest front has three bays, the central bay containing a full-height bow window with Corinthian columns and a dome. On the southeast front is a five-bay conservatory. To the northeast is a service wing, and in the yard is a circular store and an octagonal game larder.	II*
The Almshouses; 52.59728°N 2.50575°W		c. 1818	A row of almshouses in red brick with a tile roof. There is a single storey, and the six windows are modern replacement casements.	II
Benthall House; 52.61582°N 2.49036°W	—	Early 19th century	The house is in yellow brick with dressings in red brick, and a tile roof with parapeted gables. There are three storeys and three bays. The doorway has a moulded surround with pilasters, a segmental fanlight, and an open pediment on consoles. The windows are sashes with flat brick arches.	II
Linley Hall; 52.58208°N 2.46332°W		Early 19th century	A red brick house with a hipped tile roof, it incorporates fabric from earlier periods, including medieval items, and a stone Tudor house. There are three storeys, and a front of five bays. The doorway has a moulded surround, and above the three central bays is a pediment containing a three-light arched window. A rear gable is from the 16th century, and it contains a blocked mullioned window.	II
Willey Hall Broseley Drive Bridge; 52.60203°N 2.49043°W		c. 1830	The bridge carries the B4376 road over a private road. The walls are in yellow brick with stone coping, and between them are cast iron girders. The abutments are curved and terminate in piers with stone caps.	II
Chest tomb 52.59666°N 2.50659°W	—	c. 1841	The chest tomb is in the churchyard of St Giles' Church, and is to the memory of John Rose, founder of Coalport porcelain. It is in stone and Neoclassical in style. There is a plinth, moulded corner pilasters, and a hipped lid with a moulded edge. On the sides are inscriptions.	II
War memorial 52.59365°N 2.49727°W	—	1921	The war memorial is in the grounds of Willey Hall. It is in sandstone, and consists of a Celtic cross with a wheelhead on a panelled base. The cross stands on a tomb chest with a stepped plinth. The cross head has a central boss and floral decoration. On the plinth are panels with inscriptions and the names of those lost in the two World Wars.	II
