= Astbury Hall =

Stately home in Shropshire

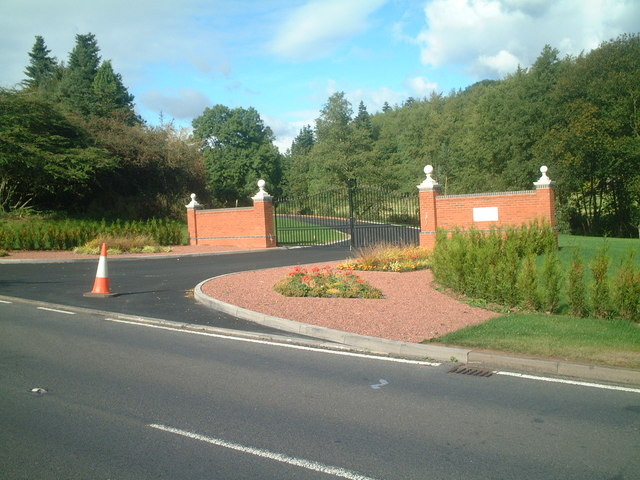
- Gates to Astbury Hall
- Interactive map of the Astbury Hall area

General information
- Location: Chelmarsh, Shropshire, England
- Coordinates: 52.4998°N 2.4096°W
- Renovated: 1891

Website
- www.theastbury.co.uk

Astbury Hall is a stately home, with a 320-acre estate, at Chelmarsh, near Bridgnorth, in Shropshire, England.

The building was destroyed by fire in 1889, and rebuilt by Edmund Southwell (mayor of Bridgnorth, 1895-1897) in 1891. John Arthur Buston, Master of the Wheatland hunt, lived at Astbury from c. 1911-c. 1937.

From 1985 and until 2019, Astbury Hall was the home of K. K. Downing, former guitarist with Judas Priest, who had a championship-standard golf course built in the grounds. In 2012 there were plans to open a hotel and luxury residential lodges funded by Regentsmead.

In October 2017 the stately home went into administration. Administrators, FRP Advisory, blamed “tougher economic times within the wider corporate hospitality market” which had put "unsustainable pressure on the cashflow of the estate under its current financial structure." It is currently for sale with an asking price of £10 million.

On Tuesday 24 April 2018 The Astbury announced it would reopen soon. The launch party took place on 1 July 2018.

In March, 2019, it was reported that there was a £50m plan set for approval at The Astbury. Shropshire Council's planning officers set Downing's estate to be transformed into a huge leisure complex including a leisure and spa building, two swimming pools, a farm shop, a function room, restaurant and spa, an outdoor lido pool, tennis courts, bowling greens, a new nine-hole golf course and an 18-hole putting green; with the addition of 300 wooden lodges. Local residents expressed concerns about the impact of the development on the nature of Eardington and added traffic on small nearby roads. The National Trust expressed their own worries of the work on the nearby Dudmaston Hall, but Shropshire Council's planning team decided that there were no grounds on which the development should be refused. Case Officer Richard Fortune said that the report recommending the application was approved, and that the extra traffic on the B4555 would be acceptable. He also noted that it would not generate a significant amount of trips compared to the already existing number of vehicles travelling along the highway. Fortune also said that Shropshire Council as highway authority "would need to demonstrate that the B4555 and surrounding highway network do not have the capacity to support a development of this nature. It is not considered a highway objection could be sustained on this basis." The impact of the volume of traffic on some junctions in Bridgnorth, most notably B4555/B4363 and Oldbury Road/Hollybush Road, have raised concerns. The report backing from the council's economic team claimed that the development could bring as much as £15 million ($19 million) of investment into the county. In a statement released from FCFM Group Limited in December 2018, they said that when they announced the plans at the time, they claimed that the development could be worth more than £3.5 million ($4.6 million) a year to the local economy.
