= St Leonard's Church, Linley =

Coordinates: 52.5834°N 2.4639°W

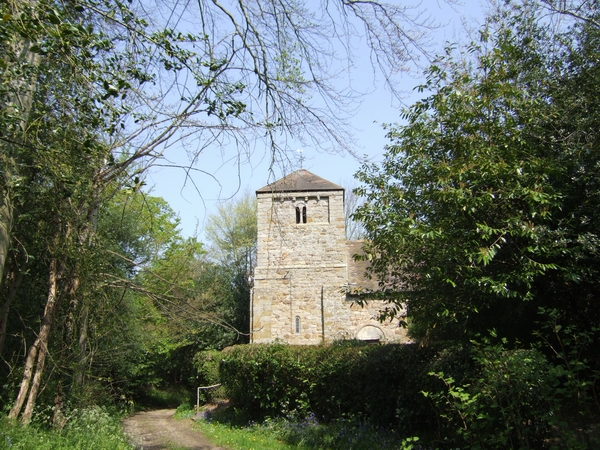
- St Leonard's Church, Linley, from the south

- Location in Shropshire
- OS grid reference: SO 687 985
- Location: Linley, Shropshire
- Country: England
- Denomination: Anglican
- Website: Churches Conservation Trust

History
- Status: Former parish church

Architecture
- Functional status: Redundant
- Heritage designation: Grade I
- Designated: 24 October 1950
- Architect: Arthur Blomfield (restoration)
- Architectural type: Church
- Style: Norman

Specifications
- Materials: Sandstone, tiled roofs

St Leonard's Church is in the hamlet of Linley, Shropshire, England. It is a redundant church under the care of the Churches Conservation Trust. When it was in active use, the church was an Anglican parish church in the deanery of Telford Severn Gorge, the archdeaconry of Ludlow, and the diocese of Hereford. Its benefice has been united with those of All Saints, Broseley, St Bartholomew, Benthall, St Giles, Barrow, and St Mary, Jackfield. The church is recorded in the National Heritage List for England as a designated Grade I listed building.

== History ==
St Leonard's originated as a chapel of ease to Holy Trinity, Much Wenlock in the 12th century, with the tower built later in the century. During the 19th century (before 1855) a pyramidal tower was added to the tower. The church was restored in 1858 by Arthur Blomfield, during which the nave windows were enlarged, the east wall was rebuilt and a new triple window inserted, new benches were installed, the floor was tiled, and a piscina was added in the sanctuary. The church was declared redundant on 24 September 2007, and was vested in the Churches Conservation Trust on 15 July 2013.

== Architecture ==
=== Exterior ===
The church is almost completely Norman in style. It is constructed in sandstone with tiled roofs. The plan consists of a nave, a narrower and lower chancel, and a west tower. The tower is in two stages on a plinth, with pilaster buttresses supporting the lower stage. In the bottom stage is a straight-headed west window, and small round-headed windows on the north and south sides. The upper stage contains double bell openings. These are set in recessed twin arches, and above them is a corbel table. On the summit is a pyramidal roof with a weathervane. In the nave is a Norman south doorway with simple imposts and a tympanum decorated with zigzag bands. The blocked north doorway, also Norman, has a tympanum carved with a Green Man, a figure with its legs apart and foliage extending from its mouth. The windows in the nave are straight-headed. The windows in the north and south walls of the chancel are small and Norman. In the east wall of the chancel are three round-headed windows dating from the 19th-century restoration.

=== Interior ===
Inside the church the walls are plastered. The tower arch has semicircular responds, and capitals decorated with volutes and beaded ornamental bands. The chancel arch is plainer, with simple imposts. Between the east windows are arches with scalloped capitals. In the south wall of the sanctuary is a piscina. The Norman font consists of a round tub, decorated around the rim with cable moulding. The exterior of the tub is carved with medallions, some of which are surrounded by bands originating from the mouths of demons, in the style of Green Men. The wooden pulpit is polygonal in shape. On the east walls of the nave are metal commandment boards. The reredos, dating from about 1870, was designed by Harry Burrows; it is a triptych containing a cross and angels, and is painted on board. Also in the church is a hatchment dated 1803, and in the blocked north doorway is the grave slab of two Roman Catholic monks who died, respectively, in 1779 and 1803. The stained glass in the east windows, dated 1862, depicts the Resurrection, and was designed by William Warrington.

== See also ==
- Grade I listed churches in Shropshire
- Listed buildings in Barrow, Shropshire
- List of churches preserved by the Churches Conservation Trust in the English Midlands
