= Listed buildings in Chelmarsh =

Chelmarsh is a civil parish in Shropshire, England. It contains four listed buildings that are recorded in the National Heritage List for England. Of these, one is listed at Grade I, the highest of the three grades, and the others are at Grade II, the lowest grade. The parish contains the village of Chelmarsh and smaller settlements, and is otherwise entirely rural. The listed buildings consist of a church and three houses.

== Key ==
Grade	Criteria
I	Buildings of exceptional interest, sometimes considered to be internationally important
II	Buildings of national importance and special interest

== Buildings ==
Name and location	Photograph	Date	Notes	Grade
The Hall; 52.48829°N 2.41122°W	—	Early 14th century	At the rear is a medieval stone range with two storeys. The main part of the house is Victorian, built in purple sandstone in Decorated style, with a tile roof. It has three storeys and a front of three gabled bays.	II
St Peter's Church; 52.48782°N 2.41300°W		14th century	The upper two stages of the tower were added in about 1720, and the porch in 1887. The body of the church is in stone, in Decorated style, and the tower is in brick with stone dressings. The church consists of a nave and a chancel in one unit, a lean-to north aisle, a south porch, and a west tower. The tower has three stages, quoins, and a balustrade at the top. Inset into the north wall of the church is a Norman doorway from an earlier church on the site.	I
Spadeley; 52.47702°N 2.40357°W	—	16th century	The house was later altered and expanded. It is partly timber framed, partly in stone, and partly in brick, and has a tile roof. Some of the house has two storeys, and elsewhere are two storeys and attics. Some windows are mullioned, and others are casements.	II
Woodcock Lodge; 52.47318°N 2.38017°W		17th century	A timber framed farmhouse, it has a T-shaped plan with gabled ends, two storeys and attics. The windows are casements. Where the upper floor is jettied, it has been infilled.	II
