= Listed buildings in Hope Bagot =

Hope Bagot is a civil parish in Shropshire, England. It contains twelve listed buildings that are recorded in the National Heritage List for England. Of these, one is listed at Grade I, the highest of the three grades, and the others are at Grade II, the lowest grade. The parish contains the village of Hope Bagot and the surrounding countryside. The oldest building in the parish is St John the Baptist's Church; this and four memorials in the churchyard are listed. The other listed buildings are houses, the oldest of which are timber framed and date from the 17th century.

== Key ==
Grade	Criteria
I	Buildings of exceptional interest, sometimes considered to be internationally important
II	Buildings of national importance and special interest

== Buildings ==
Name and location	Photograph	Date	Notes	Grade
St John the Baptist's Church; 52.36304°N 2.60533°W		12th century	The church was altered during the following centuries, and was restored in 1868 and 1911. It is in stone, partly rendered, with a tile roof, and consists of a nave with a south porch, a chancel and a west tower. The tower has two stages, lancet windows and a pyramidal roof. The north side of the church and the south doorway are Norman in style, and the windows on the south side date from the 14th century. The east window in the chancel has a square head and is in Decorated style.	I
Hollins; 52.35539°N 2.61549°W	—	Late 16th century	The house was extended in the 17th and 19th centuries. It is timber framed with infill in brick and stucco, the ground floor has been underbuilt in stone, and the roof is tiled. There are two storeys and an attic, and an H-shaped plan consisting of a hall range and two gabled cross-wings, and with a single-storey gabled extension to the left. The windows are casements.	II
Combes; 52.35182°N 2.60679°W	—	17th century	The house was partly rebuilt and extended in the 20th century. The original part is timber framed with plastered panels, the rebuilding and extension are in brick, and the roof is thatched. The original part has one storey and an attic and two bays, to the right is a single-storey extension, and at the rear is a lean-to. On the front is an open gabled porch, the windows are casements, on the left end is a bay window, and at the rear the roof is swept over a half-dormer.	II
Upper House; 52.36273°N 2.60438°W		17th century	The house has a stone ground floor, the upper floor is timber framed with brick infill, and the roof is tiled with gables and bargeboards. There are two storeys with an attic, four bays, and at the end is a single-storey extension. Above the central doorway is a canopy. The windows in the main range are casements, and in the extension is a mullioned and transomed window.	II
Memorial to Clara Giles; 52.36292°N 2.60532°W	—	Early 18th century	The memorial is in the churchyard of St John the Baptist's Church. It consists of a rectangular headstone set horizontally and consists of a twin tablet with an inscription running across it. The memorial is decorated with heart and laurel leaf motifs, and has a carved top.	II
Memorial to Thomas Giles; 52.36294°N 2.60537°W	—	Early 18th century	The memorial is in the churchyard of St John the Baptist's Church. It consists of a rectangular headstone set vertically, and has a double-ogee and wave moulded-shaped top. The memorial contains two inscribed panels with decoration including a motif of clasped hands.	II
Memorial to John Penney; 52.36296°N 2.60546°W	—	Early 18th century	The memorial is in the churchyard of St John the Baptist's Church, and is a headstone. It has a double-ogee and roll-shaped top, and contains an inscribed panel with incised foliage.	II
Memorial to J. Walker; 52.36299°N 2.60535°W	—	Early 18th century	The memorial is in the churchyard of St John the Baptist's Church. It consists of a rectangular headstone set vertically, and has a double ogee-shaped top with foliate decoration over a plain inscribed panel.	II
Hope Villa; 52.36377°N 2.60438°W	—	Late 18th or early 19th century	A mainly brick house, in stone on the right and at the rear, and with a hipped slate roof. The main range has three storeys and three bays, and at the rear is a two-storey four-bay gabled range with a tile roof. On the front is a gabled timber porch, and the doorway has a fanlight. The windows on the front are sashes, and in the rear range they are casements.	II
Rectory and stable block 52.36333°N 2.60503°W		Late 18th or early 19th century	The building is in brick with stone rear walls, and has a hipped slate roof with coped gables. The house has two storeys, and an L-shaped plan, consisting of a main range and a rear cross-wing, and a stable block to the right in brick with a tile roof. The main range has four bays, one of which projects and contains a doorway with a canopy and a hood mould. The windows are sashes with segmental-arched lintels.	II
Hope Court; 52.36124°N 2.60828°W		Early 19th century	The house is in brick on a stone plinth, with a cornice, a parapet with ball finials, and a hipped slate roof. The main block has three storeys and a cellar and three bays, there are flanking single-storey wings, and at the rear are three two-storey gabled wings. On the front is an enclosed porch with a fanlight, the doorway has Tuscan columns and an entablature, and the windows are sashes.	II
Garden house 52.36297°N 2.60481°W		Mid 19th century	The building, which originated as a Sunday School, is in the garden of the Rectory. It is in brick on a moulded plinth, and has a tile roof with an ornamental ridge. The building has a square plan and four symmetrical gables. On two sides are lancet windows with chamfered surrounds containing Gothic cast iron tracery, and the doorway has a pointed head.	II
