= Salopian Art Pottery =

Type of English decorative earthenware

Salopian Art Pottery was a range of decorative earthenwares made by Caughley China Works, a factory in Caughley, Shropshire, England (near Broseley), between 1772 and 1799. Salopian pottery was the first porcelain to be made in Shropshire. Pieces were marked with a variety of impressed and inscribed marks, the most frequent mark being 'SALOPIAN' in upper-case printers' type.

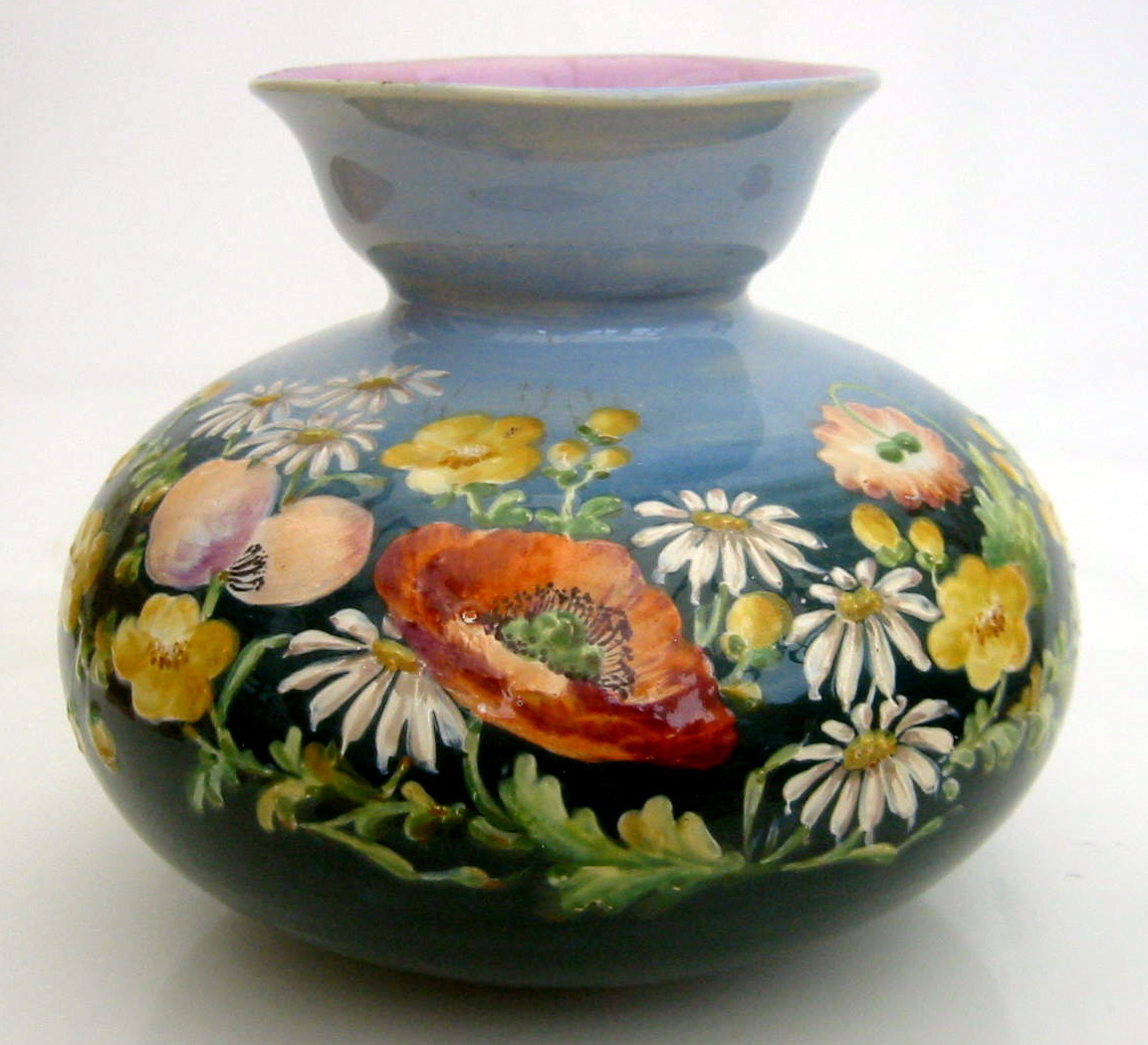
Salopian Art Pottery barbitone vase, c. 1900.

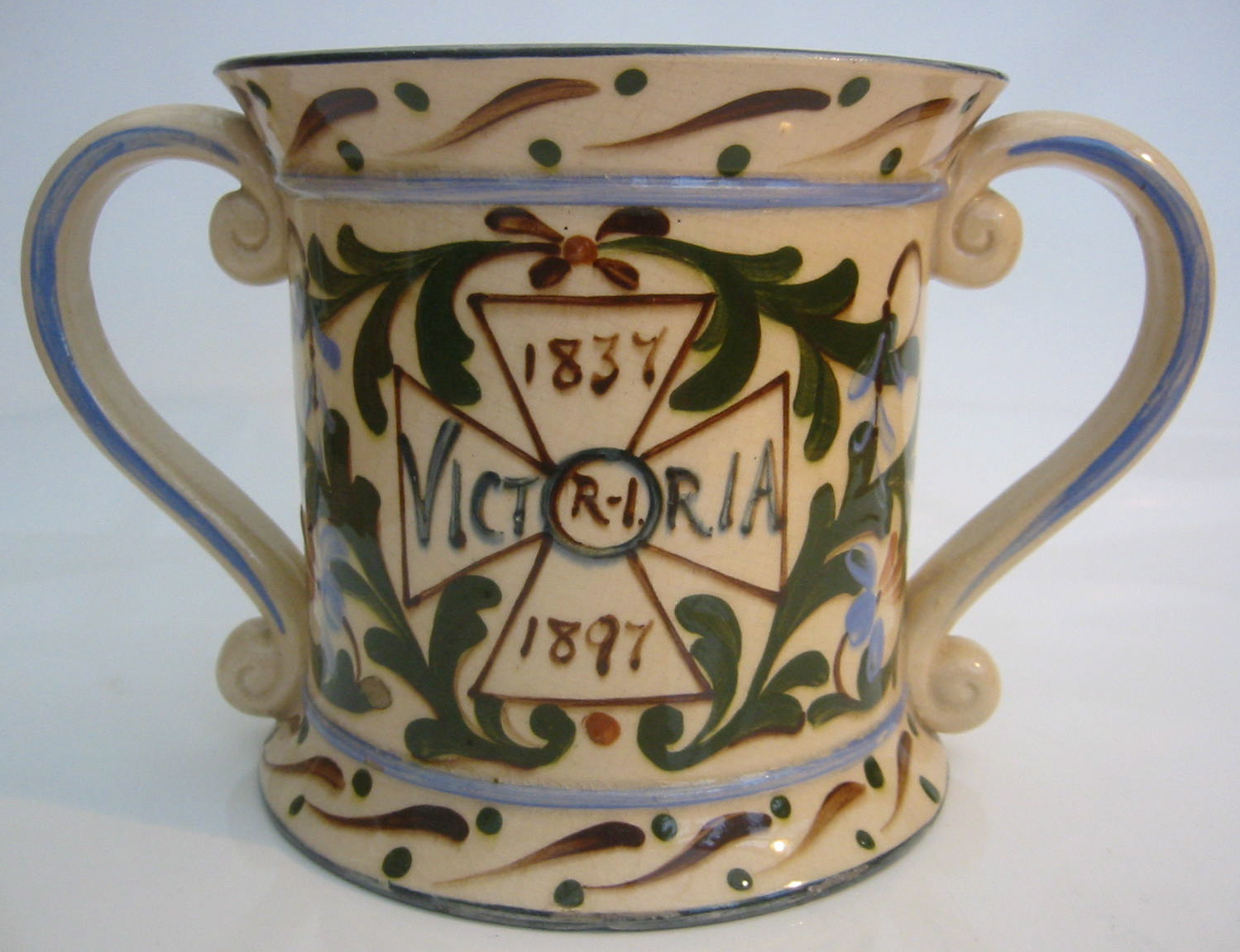
Salopian Art Pottery slip-painted loving cup, produced for the Golden Jubilee of Queen Victoria, 1897
