= St Giles' Church, Barrow =

Coordinates: 52.5965°N 2.5065°W

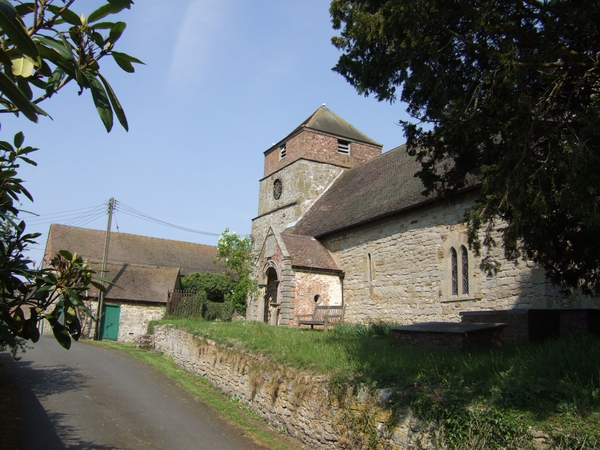
- St Giles' Church, Barrow, from the southeast

- Location in Shropshire
- OS grid reference: SO 658 999
- Location: Barrow, Shropshire
- Country: England
- Denomination: Anglican
- Website: Broseley Parishes

History
- Status: Parish church
- Dedication: Saint Giles

Architecture
- Functional status: Active
- Heritage designation: Grade I
- Designated: 24 October 1950
- Architect(s): G. E. Street, Ewan Christian
- Architectural type: Church
- Style: Anglo-Saxon, Norman, Neoclassical (porch), Gothic Revival (north chapel)

Specifications
- Materials: Stone and brick, tiled roofs

Administration
- Province: Canterbury
- Diocese: Hereford
- Archdeaconry: Ludlow
- Deanery: Telford Severn Gorge
- Parish: Linley with Willey and Barrow

Clergy
- Rector: Revd Fr. Christopher Penn

St Giles' Church is in the hamlet of Barrow, Shropshire, England. It is an active Anglican parish church in the deanery of Telford Severn Gorge, the archdeaconry of Ludlow, and the diocese of Hereford. Its benefice is united with those of All Saints, Broseley, St Mary, Jackfield, St Bartholomew, Benthall, and St Leonard, Linley. The church is recorded in the National Heritage List for England as a designated Grade I listed building. It is one of the earliest surviving churches in Shropshire, and contains the county's only Anglo-Saxon chancel.

== History ==
St Giles' was originally built as a chapel to Wenlock Abbey. The date of origin of its chancel is uncertain; it has been suggested that this was as early as the 8th century, but it is more likely that it originated in the 11th century. The Norman nave dates from about 1100, and probably replaced an earlier timber nave. The lower parts of the tower date from later in the 12th century. A brick south porch was built in 1705, and the brick top stage of the tower and its pyramidal roof were added during the 18th century. The church was restored in 1851–52 by G. E. Street. In 1894–95 Ewan Christian built the north chapel to replace a chapel dating from 1688, and also rebuilt the east wall of the chancel.

== Architecture ==
=== Exterior ===
Other than the brick top stage of the tower and the porch, the church is constructed in stone with tiled roofs. On the north wall of the chancel is an Anglo-Saxon window and traces of a strip pilaster. In the south wall is a Norman priest's doorway which cuts into an earlier window. In the nave the Norman features consist of two windows in the north wall, and a window and a doorway in the south wall. The tower has a Norman west doorway and one Norman window. The east wall of the nave has been built around the east gable of the chancel. The porch is Neoclassical in style; it is built in red brick with rusticated stone quoins. Its outer doorway is round-headed with a keystone, flanked by a pair of oculi. Inside the porch is a pillar piscina.

=== Interior ===
The chancel arch is Anglo-Saxon in origin, but it was altered during Street's restoration. The tower arch consists of the original Norman west doorway of the nave before the tower was built. Its tympanum, now seen from within the tower, is decorated with three tiers of saltire crosses in squares. The font consists of a plain tub on a cylindrical stem, and probably dates from the 12th century. The timber pulpit is in the shape of a drum, and is decorated with traceried panels. Also in the church is a poor box dating from about 1690 that is mounted in a later stem. The wall monuments date from the 17th, 18th and 19th centuries.

== External features ==
In the churchyard is the Neoclassical chest tomb of John Rose, the creator of the Coalport China Works, who died in 1841. It is listed at Grade II.

Barrow Church Cemetery contains the war grave of a Royal Artillery soldier of World War II.

== See also ==
- Grade I listed churches in Shropshire
- Listed buildings in Barrow, Shropshire
