= St Andrew's Church, Great Ness =

Coordinates: 52.7655°N 2.8943°W

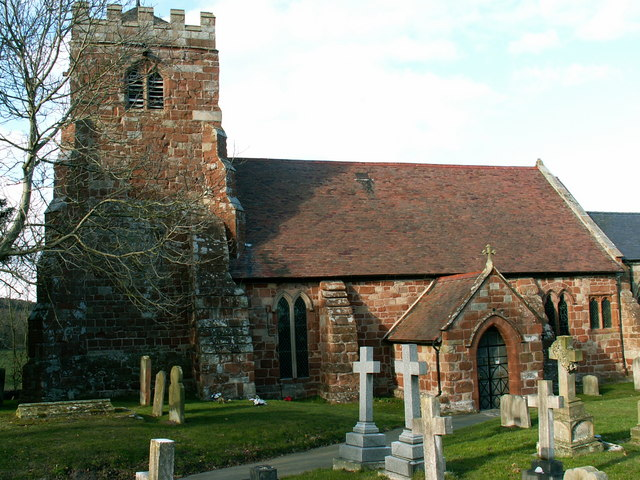
- St Andrew's Church, Great Ness, from the south

- Location in Shropshire
- OS grid reference: SJ 398 190
- Location: Great Ness, Shropshire
- Country: England
- Denomination: Anglican
- Website: St Andrew, Great Ness

History
- Status: Parish church

Architecture
- Functional status: Active
- Heritage designation: Grade I
- Designated: 27 May 1953
- Architectural type: Church
- Style: Gothic

Specifications
- Materials: Sandstone; Nave tiled, chancel slated

Administration
- Province: Canterbury
- Diocese: Lichfield
- Archdeaconry: Salop
- Deanery: Ellesmere
- Parish: Great Ness

Clergy
- Vicar: Revd Lucinda Burns

St Andrew's Church is in the village of Great Ness, Shropshire, England. It is an active Anglican parish church in the deanery of Ellesmere, the archdeaconry of Salop, and the diocese of Lichfield. Its benefice is united with those of St Martin, Little Ness, and St John the Baptist, Ruyton-XI-Towns. The church is recorded in the National Heritage List for England as a designated Grade I listed building.

== History ==
The church originated as a collegiate church in the Saxon era, and is recorded in the Domesday Book. The nave and the tower of the present church date from the 13th century, and the chancel from the early part of the following century. The upper part of the tower was either added or rebuilt during the 17th century. The south porch was described as being "nearly new" in 1824. In 1852 the chancel was re-roofed, and the church was partly restored in 1880. The vestry was added in the late 19th century.

== Architecture ==
=== Exterior ===
The nave and tower are constructed in red sandstone, the nave having a tiled roof. The chancel is in pinkish-grey sandstone, and has a slate roof. The plan of the church consists of a three-bay nave with a south porch, a two-bay chancel with a north vestry, and a west tower. The tower is in three stages, with lancet windows in the lower two stages, and diagonal buttresses. In the top stage are two-light louvred bell openings. The tower has a battlemented parapet, and a pyramidal cap with a weathervane. The nave is in Early English style, its windows being paired lancets. The chancel is in Decorated style. On the south side of the chancel is a priest's door. The east window has three lights.

=== Interior ===
Inside the south wall of the nave are the arches of a two-bay arcade of an aisle that has been removed. The south wall of the chancel contains an ogee-headed piscina, and a small aumbry. The chancel roof dates from 1852, and the nave roof is medieval. The altar rail dates from the 17th century, and incorporates turned balusters. The chancel is floored with encaustic tiles, and in the west end of the nave are re-set medieval tiles. The font is dated 1850 and the pulpit 1885; both are polygonal and in stone. At the west end of the church is a gallery of 1765, carried on two square posts, and containing the organ. On its front are painted boards, one containing the Royal arms. To the right of the chancel arch is a hatchment. Some of the windows contain 19th-century stained glass. Also in the church are memorial tablets dating from the late 18th and the early 19th centuries. There is a ring of six bells. The oldest, cast by Thomas Clibury, is dated 1634. Four bells were cast in 1932 by Gillett & Johnston, and the sixth bell is undated.

== External features ==
In the churchyard are memorials listed at Grade II. To the southeast of the church is a pair of memorials known as the Wingfield Memorials. These are two chest tombs of unusual design dating from the mid to late 18th century. To the northeast of the church is the Edwards Memorial. This is a sandstone pedestal tomb dated 1820 surmounted by a large urn. Also in the churchyard is a sandstone churchyard cross dating from the 14th or 15th century. It has an octagonal plan with four steps, and a truncated shaft. The cross is also listed at Grade II, and is a scheduled monument. Near the path to the south side of the church is a Commonwealth war grave of a King's Liverpool Regiment soldier of World War I.

== See also ==
- Grade I listed churches in Shropshire
