= St John the Baptist's Church, Hope Bagot =

Coordinates: 52.3630°N 2.6053°W

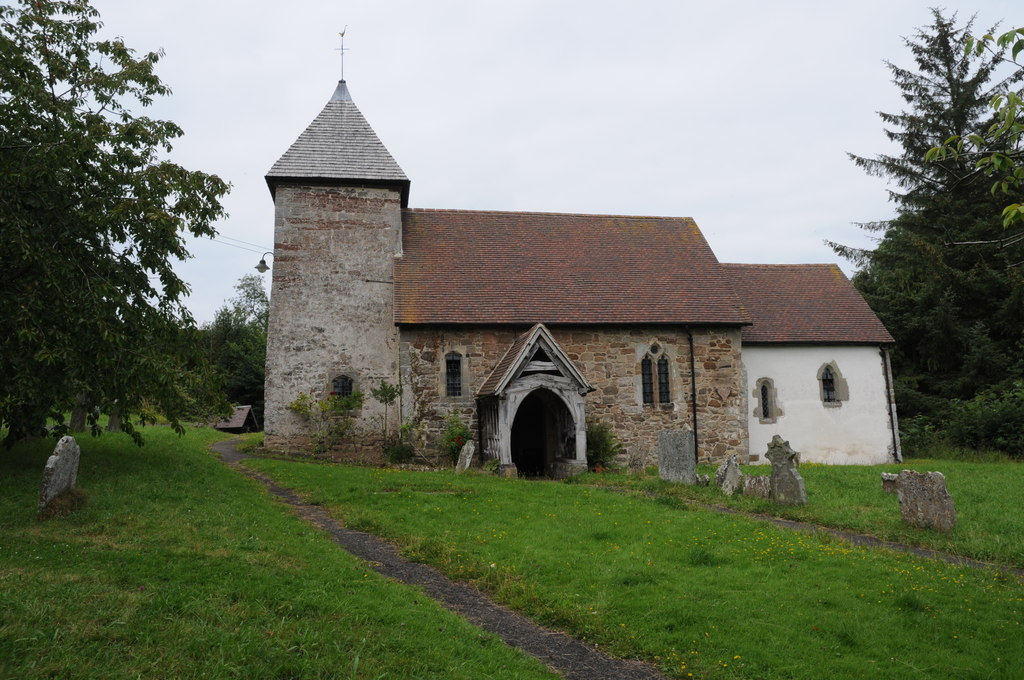
- St John the Baptist's Church, Hope Bagot, from the south

- Location in Shropshire
- OS grid reference: SO 589 741
- Location: Hope Bagot, Shropshire
- Country: England
- Denomination: Anglican
- Website: Tenbury Team Ministry

History
- Status: Parish church

Architecture
- Functional status: Active
- Heritage designation: Grade I
- Designated: 12 November 1954
- Architect: W. D. Caroe (restoration)
- Architectural type: Church
- Style: Norman, Gothic

Specifications
- Materials: Stone, tile roofs

Administration
- Province: Canterbury
- Diocese: Hereford
- Archdeaconry: Ludlow
- Deanery: Ludlow
- Parish: Hope Bagot

Clergy
- Rector: Revd Claire Lording
- Vicar: Revd Sian Harris

St John the Baptist's Church is in the village of Hope Bagot, Shropshire, England. It is an active Anglican parish church in the deanery of Ludlow, the archdeaconry of Ludlow, and the diocese of Hereford. Its benefice is united with those of eleven local churches to form the Tenbury Team Ministry. The church is recorded in the National Heritage List for England as a designated Grade I listed building.

== History ==
The church dates from the 12th century, with alterations and additions in the 13th, 14th and 17th centuries.

The Hill (de Hull/de la Hall) of Court of Hill and Burford family had the living from the 1200s until the mid 1500s.

It was restored in 1868 and again in 1911. The later restoration was carried out by W. D. Caroe.

== Architecture ==
St John's is a small church and is largely Norman in style. It is constructed in stone rubble with ashlar dressings, is partly rendered, and has a tiled roof. Its plan consists of a nave with a south porch, a chancel, and a west tower. The tower is in two stages; it has walls that incline inwards, and is surmounted by a pyramidal cap. There are lancet windows on the west and south sides of the tower. The north side of the church is entirely Norman, with a single window in both the nave and the chancel. The south doorway is also Norman, and has a plain tympanum. The windows on the south side of the church date from the 14th century. The south porch is in timber. The east window has two lights, and appears to date from the early 16th century.

The interior of the church is also largely Norman, although the chancel roof dates from Caroe's restoration. In the chancel is a piscina and a stepped sedilia. The plain font dates from the 12th century, and the oak pulpit from the 17th century. Behind the pulpit is a wall painting with an inscription including the date 1681. There is stained glass in the east window dating from about 1900.

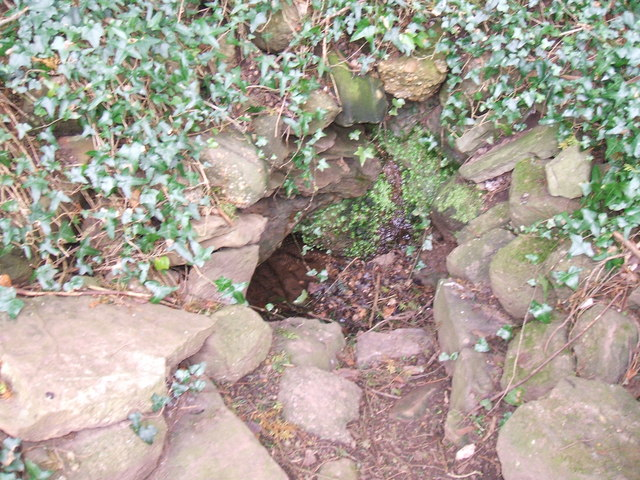
The holy well

== Holy Well ==
There is an ancient yew tree in the churchyard, beneath which is a holy well that has been venerated for centuries. It is possible that the well has been of religious importance since pre-Christian times. The water was regarded as being especially good for curing sore eyes.

== External features ==
In the churchyard to the south of the church are four memorials, each of which is listed at Grade II. All are headstones dating from the early 18th century. The memorial to Clara and William Giles contains carving depicting a heart and laurel leaves. The memorial to Jane Walker, who died in 1728, is decorated with foliage, as is the memorial to John Penny, who died in 1729. The memorial to Thomas Giles, who died in 1739, and to his wife, who died in 1729, has a carving of clasped hands.

== See also ==
- Grade I listed churches in Shropshire
- Listed buildings in Hope Bagot
