= List of works by Samuel Pountney Smith =

Samuel Pountney Smith (1812–1883) was an English architect who practised in Shrewsbury, Shropshire, England. He was influenced by A. W. N. Pugin, and usually designed his churches in Early English style.

== Key ==
| Grade | Criteria |
|---|---|
| Grade I | Buildings of exceptional interest, sometimes considered to be internationally important. |
| Grade II* | Particularly important buildings of more than special interest. |
| Grade II | Buildings of national importance and special interest. |
"—" denotes a work that is not graded.

== Works ==
| Name | Location | Photograph | Date | Notes | Grade |
|---|---|---|---|---|---|
| Pimley Manor | Uffington, Shropshire; 52.7246°N 2.7092°W | — | 1840 | New house. Now a business estate and a fishery. Built by the genteel House of Pimley. | — |
| St Peter's Church | Cound, Shropshire; 52.6409°N 2.6543°W | | 1842 | North aisle added in 1842, followed by the chancel in 1862. | I |
| Holy Trinity Church | Much Wenlock, Shropshire; 52.5964°N 2.5571°W | | 1843, 1866 | Added windows to the south aisle and the south chapel. | I |
| St Mary's Church | Harley, Shropshire; 52.6095°N 2.5977°W | | 1845–46 | Medieval church rebuilt, other than the tower. | II |
| Christ Church, Little Drayton | Market Drayton, Shropshire; 52.8987°N 2.5020°W | — | 1846–47 | With John Smith, a new church. | II |
| Priory Hall | Much Wenlock, Shropshire | — | 1847–48 | Built as a National School. | — |
| Library | Much Wenlock, Shropshire; 52.5957°N 2.5579°W | — | 1852 | Built as the Corn Market and Agricultural Library, later a public library. | II |
| Hospital of the Holy Cross | Shrewsbury, Shropshire; 52.7081°N 2.7441°W | | 1853 | Almshouses. | II |
| St Peter and St Paul's Church | Sheinton, Shropshire; 52.6322°N 2.5768°W | | 1854 | Restoration, including the addition of a north aisle. | II* |
| St Michael's Church | Shrewsbury, Shropshire; 52.7180°N 2.7461°W | — | 1855 | Remodelling of a church dating from 1829–30. Later used as a Freemasons' Hall. | II |
| St George's Church | Burrington, Herefordshire; 52.3441°N 2.8201°W | | c. 1855 | Rebuilding of the nave of a church dating from the 13th century or earlier. | II |
| Cemetery buildings | Shrewsbury, Shropshire; 52.6976°N 2.7597°W | | 1856 | Comprising chapels, a porte-cochère, and flanking lodges. | II |
| Holy Trinity Church | Uffington, Shropshire; 52.7206°N 2.7002°W | | 1856 | New church on the site of a medieval church. | II |
| Buntingsdale Hall | Sutton upon Tern, Shropshire; 52.8891°N 2.5148°W | | 1857 | Addition of the north wing. | II* |
| St Mary's Church | Shrewsbury, Shropshire; 52.7087°N 2.7513°W | | 1858–70 | Alterations to the east window and the roofs. The church is now redundant and under the care of the Churches Conservation Trust. | I |
| Lutwyche Hall | Easthope, Shropshire; 52.5478°N 2.6557°W | — | 1859 | Remodelling of, and extensions to, a house dating from 1587 for Judge Edward Lutwyche. | II |
| Holy Trinity Church | Leaton, Shropshire; 52.7602°N 2.7878°W | | 1859 | A new church for John Arthur Lloyd; steeple added by Pountney Smith in 1871. | II |
| Hinton Hall | Whitchurch, Shropshire; 52.9908°N 2.6953°W | — | 1859 | Country house for Robert Peel Ethelston. | II |
| Sweeney Hall | Oswestry, Shropshire; 52.8318°N 3.0504°W | | c. 1860 | Addition of service wing to the rear of a house dating from 1805. | II |
| Kinnersley House | Belle Vue Road, Shrewsbury, Shropshire; 52.7014°N 2.7481°W | — | c. 1860 | Pair of houses. | II |
| Morfe House | Belle Vue Road, Shrewsbury, Shropshire; 52.7012°N 2.7477°W | — | c. 1860 | House. | II |
| The Limes | Belle Vue Road, Shrewsbury, Shropshire; 52.6984°N 2.7502°W | — | c. 1860 | Remodelling of an older house for his own use. | II |
| School | Church Street, Church Stretton, Shropshire; 52.5376°N 2.8097°W | — | 1860–61 | Built as a National School, later used as a library and tourist information centre. | — |
| St Giles' Church | Shrewsbury, Shropshire; 52.7020°N 2.7306°W | — | 1860–63 | Restoration of a church dating from the 12th century, with enlargement of the north aisle to form a new nave. | II* |
| St Giles' Church | Downton, Herefordshire; 52.3638°N 2.8275°W | | c. 1861 | New church. | II |
| St John the Baptist's Church | Ruyton-XI-Towns, Shropshire; 52.7936°N 2.8989°W | — | 1861–62, 1866–68 | Restoration of the chancel, and later the nave. | II |
| Church of the Holy Cross | Shrewsbury, Shropshire; 52.7076°N 2.7438°W | | 1861–63 | Restoration. | I |
| St Mary Magdalene's Church | Battlefield, Shropshire; 52.7507°N 2.7237°W | | 1862 | Restoration of a church dating from the early 15th century. It is now redundant and is under the care of the Churches Conservation Trust. | II* |
| St Andrews Church | Hope Bowdler, Shropshire; 52.5270°N 2.7740°W | | 1863 | Church rebuilt, re-using some older fabric. | II |
| St Collen’s Church | Llangollen, Denbighshire, Wales; 52.9694°N 3.1678°W | | 1864–67 | Remodelling and enlargement of a church dating from 1164. | I |
| St Martin's Church | Preston Gubbals, Shropshire; 52.7717°N 2.7546°W | | 1866 | Partial rebuilding and enlargement of a church dating from the 12th century. Now redundant and under the care of the Churches Conservation Trust. | II* |
| Old Vicarage | Alberbury, Shropshire | — | 1867–68 | | — |
| St Laurence's Church | Church Stretton, Shropshire; 52.5382°N 2.8088°W | | 1867–68 | Added west aisles to the transepts to a church dating from the 12th century. | I |
| St Michael's Church | Munslow, Shropshire; 52.4853°N 2.7067°W | | 1869–70 | Restoration of a church dating from the 12th century. | I |
| St Michael's Church | Stanton Long, Shropshire; 52.5126°N 2.6327°W | | 1869–70 | Restoration of a 13th-century church, with some rebuilding. | II* |
| Pale Hall | Llandderfel, Gwynedd, Wales; 52.9126°N 3.5144°W | — | 1869–71 | Built for the railway engineer, Henry Robertson, on the site of an older house. | II* |
| Llantysilio Hall | Llantysilio, Denbighshire, Wales; 52.9844°N 3.2059°W | — | 1872–74 | Built for the railway engineer, Charles Beyer, on a site close to an older house. | II* |
| Holy Trinity Church | Wistanstow, Shropshire; 52.4653°N 2.8371°W | | 1873–74 | Restoration of the chancel of a church dating from the 12th century. | II* |
| Corfton Hall | Corfton, Shropshire; 52.4600°N 2.7494°W | — | 1874–75 | Built for T. Lloyd Roberts; only part of the service court has survived. | — |
| Ferney Hall | Onibury, Shropshire; 52.3928°N 2.8321°W | | 1875 | Pountney Smith supervised its rebuilding after a fire. The house was abandoned in the 1940s, but was restored in the 2000s. | II |
| St Trillo's Church | Llandrillo, Denbighshire, Wales; 52.9224°N 3.4378°W | | 1875–77 | Almost complete rebuilding. | II |
| Pountney Gardens | Shrewsbury, Shropshire; 52.7018°N 2.7479°W | — | 1876–80 | A housing development. | — |
| St Mary's Church | Highley, Shropshire; 52.4468°N 2.3823°W | | 1880–81 | Restoration of a church dating from the 12th century. | II* |
