= St Peter's Church, Chelmarsh =

Coordinates: 52.4878°N 2.4130°W

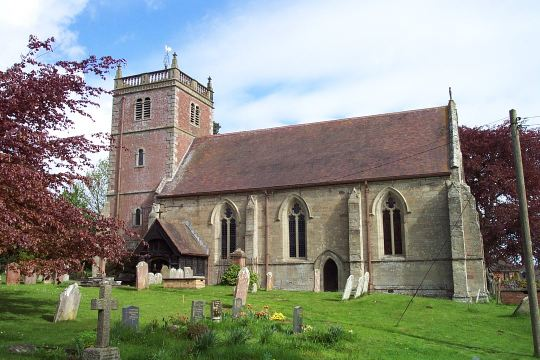
- St Peter's Church, Chelmarsh, from the south

- Location in Shropshire
- OS grid reference: SO 721 879
- Location: Chelmarsh, Shropshire
- Country: England
- Denomination: Anglican
- Website: St Peter, Chelmarsh

History
- Status: Parish church

Architecture
- Functional status: Active
- Heritage designation: Grade I
- Designated: 9 March 1970
- Architect: J. Farmer (porch)
- Architectural type: Church
- Style: Norman, Gothic, Neoclassical

Specifications
- Materials: Stone and brick

Administration
- Province: Canterbury
- Diocese: Hereford
- Archdeaconry: Ludlow
- Deanery: Bridgnorth
- Parish: Chelmarsh

Clergy
- Vicar: Revd V. R. Smith

St Peter's Church is in the village of Chelmarsh, Shropshire, England. It is an active Anglican parish church in the deanery of Bridgnorth, the archdeaconry of Ludlow, and the diocese of Hereford. Its benefice is united with those of seven other churches to form the benefice of Highley with Billingsley, Glazeley and Deuxhill, and Chelmarsh. The church is recorded in the National Heritage List for England as a designated Grade I listed building.

== History ==
The body of the church dates from the 14th century, and replaced an earlier church on the site. This part of the church was probably completed by 1345, when a chantry chapel was endowed by Hugh de Mortimer. The lower part of the west tower is also from this time, the upper part being added in about 1720. The south porch was built in 1887 by J. Farmer of Newport.

== Architecture ==
The body of the church is constructed in stone, and is in Decorated style. Re-set in the north wall is a Norman doorway from an earlier church. The upper parts of the tower are in brick with stone dressings, and in Neoclassical style. The tower has a west doorway, above which is a three-light window. There are diagonal buttresses, alternating quoins, paired round-headed bell openings, and a balustrade on the summit. On the south side of the church is a porch, a priest's doorway and three tall two-light windows. The east window has five lights. Inside the church is a four-bay arcade carried on octagonal piers. The stained glass in the east window is dated 1892, it was designed by Kempe, and depicts the Crucifixion. In the south window of the chancel is glass by Burlison and Grylls, dating from about 1888, and depicting the Parable of the Sower. In the chancel is part of a tomb chest in Perpendicular style. A pair of similar marble plaques separately form parish war memorials to the dead of either World War, accompanied by framed displays of a photograph of each man listed, and nearby hangs an embroidered regimental badge of the King's Shropshire Light Infantry. The two-manual pipe organ was made by Nicholson and Son of Gloucester. There is a ring of six bells, all of which were cast in 1720 by Abraham Rudhall II of Gloucester.

== External features ==
The churchyard contains a war grave of a World War II airman.

== See also ==
- Grade I listed churches in Shropshire
- Listed buildings in Chelmarsh
