= Caughley =

Former township in Shropshire, England

Coordinates: 52.599919°N 2.445987°W

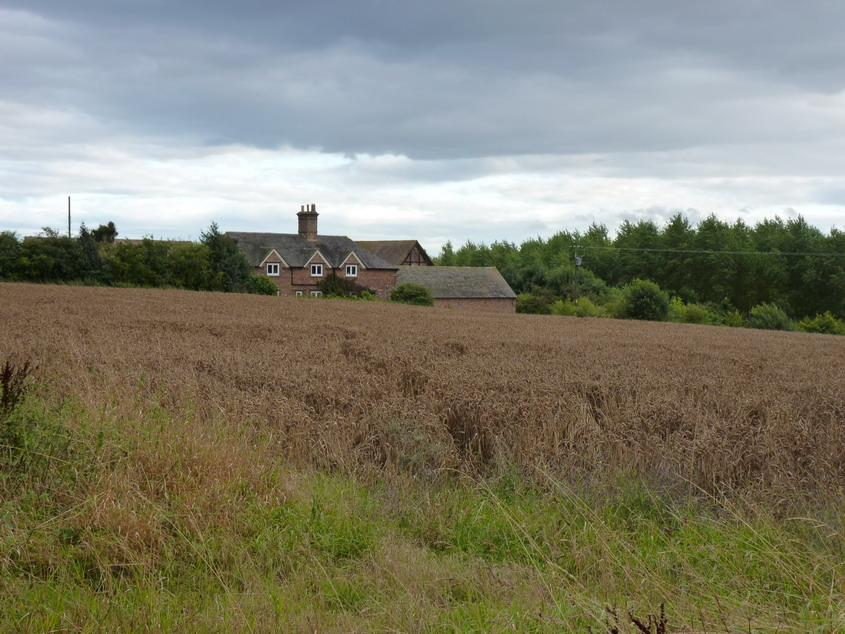
- Caughley Farm from Caughley Road

- Location within Shropshire
- Population: 48 (1931)
- Civil parish: Barrow
- Unitary authority: Shropshire
- Ceremonial county: Shropshire
- Region: West Midlands
- Country: England
- Sovereign state: United Kingdom
- Post town: Broseley
- Police: West Mercia
- Fire: Shropshire
- Ambulance: West Midlands
- UK Parliament: Ludlow

Caughley (/ˈkɑːfli/) was a non-nucleated settlement situated two kilometres east of Barrow near Much Wenlock in Shropshire, England, with the River Severn running down its eastern edge and Dean Brook along its south-western edge. It is noted as a site of the production of Coalport porcelain. In 1883, Caughley extended to 332 hectares and in 1931 the population of the township stood at 48.

== Administration ==
In the Middle Ages, Caughley belonged to the parish of Holy Trinity centred on Much Wenlock, but by 1649 it was in Barrow parish. Caughley was transferred to Linley Civil Parish, in the Barrow ward of Wenlock borough, in 1934, but returned to Barrow Civil Parish when Linley Civil Parish was itself absorbed by Barrow Civil Parish in 1966. Barrow Civil Parish was in Bridgenorth rural district from 1966 to 1974, and from 1974 in Bridgnorth district.

== Etymology ==
The name of Caughley is first attested in 901, as an estate-name among lands acquired by the minsters of Much Wenlock, cahing læg. This was interpreted by Sigurd Karlström as deriving from a personal name *Cah(h)a followed by the Old English place-name-forming suffix -ing, but later by Eilert Ekwall and Margaret Gelling as the Old English word ceahhe ('jackdaw') followed by the same suffix, meaning 'jackdaw place'. Alaric Hall thought that the word ceahhe was unlikely, but that another (otherwise lost) word for a bird could be involved. The læg element is a form of the Old English word lēah ('clearing in woodland'). Thus in total the name probably meant 'jackdaw-clearing'.

== History ==
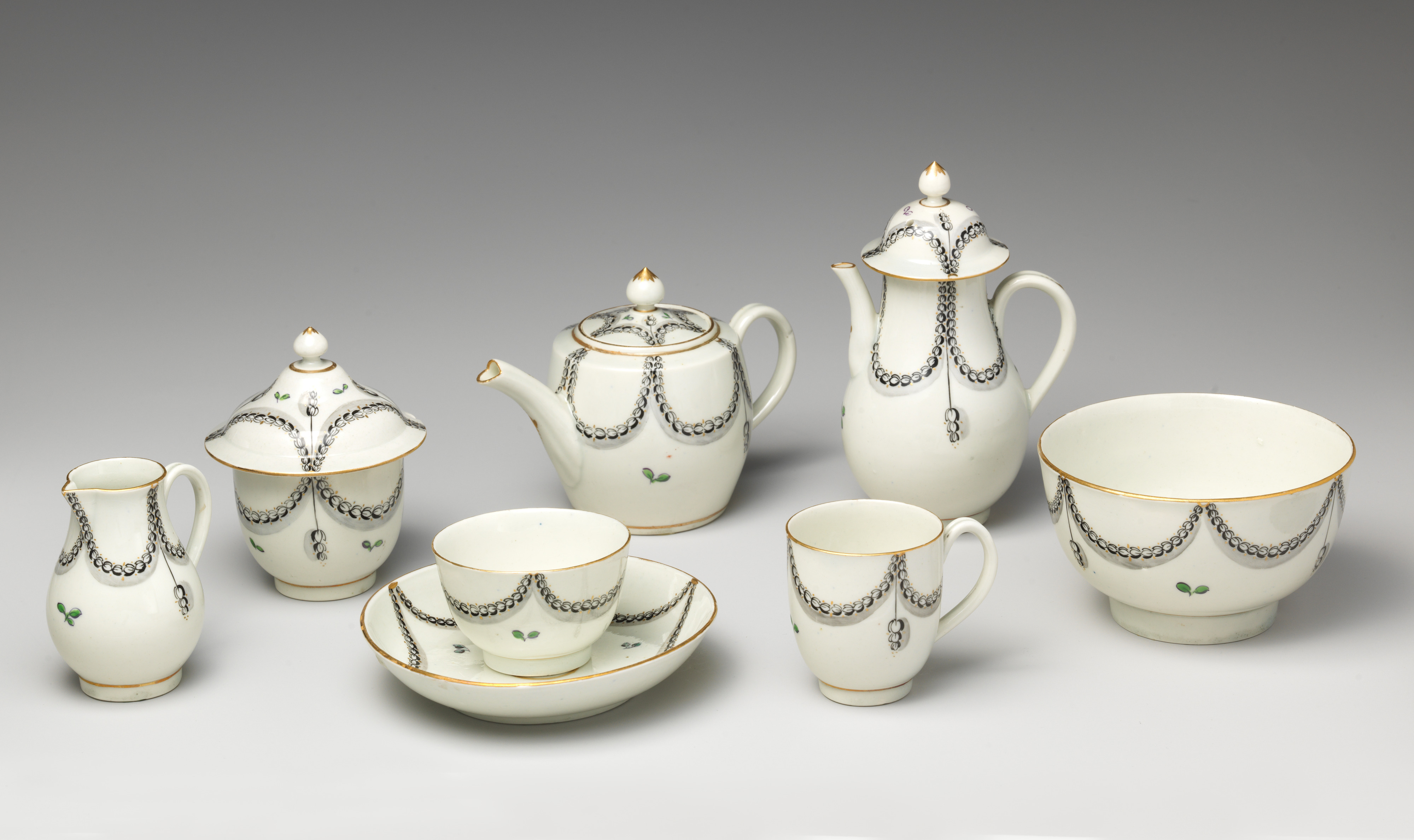
Caughley teaset from the 1780s

Unusually, Caughley is not mentioned in the Domesday Book of 1086. Mining of limestone, coal, and ironstone, with associated iron production, was underway already in the sixteenth century; Thomas Munslow had established an ironworks there by around 1523.

A pottery was established around 1750, creating slip-coated and coarse wares. Ambrose Gallimore (from the Staffordshire potteries) made traditional course and slip-coated wares. He was joined in 1772 by Thomas Turner, who had trained at the Worcester porcelain works. This became the Salopian China Manufactory, making porcelain by 1775, flanked by coal mines to the south-west of Inett Farm to the east of what was then the Caughley hamlet of Darley. Caughley came to prominence as an industrial centre, employing the noted porcelain engraver Robert Hancock and supplying the Salopian China Warehouse, which opened in London in 1783. By 1793, the factory had around one hundred workers. The lease, factory, and stock at Caughley was acquired in 1799 by the Coalport porcelain makers Edward Blakeway, Richard Rose, and John Rose. Porcelain production continued Caughley though much of it was decorated at Coalport till the works finally closed in 1814.

Shrewsbury Art Gallery held an exhibition of Caughley Porcelains, about 400 pieces from various lenders to mark the factory's bi-centinary in 1975.
