= Benthall, Shropshire =

Village in Shropshire, England

Coordinates: 52.615°N 2.495°W

Benthall
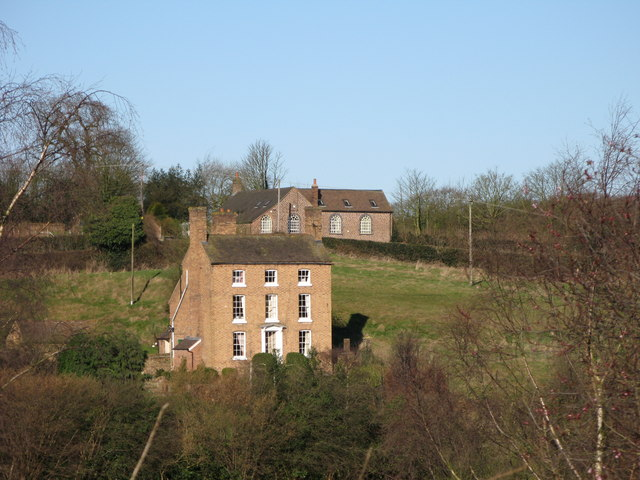
- Part of Benthall village, Shropshire

- Location within Shropshire
- OS grid reference: SJ665020
- Civil parish: Barrow
- Unitary authority: Shropshire district
- Ceremonial county: Shropshire
- Region: West Midlands
- Country: England
- Sovereign state: United Kingdom
- Post town: BROSELEY
- Postcode district: TF12
- Dialling code: 01952
- Police: West Mercia
- Fire: Shropshire
- Ambulance: West Midlands
- UK Parliament: Ludlow

Benthall is a small village in the civil parish of Barrow, Shropshire, England. It is south of Telford, about a mile south of Ironbridge on the River Severn, and almost contiguous with the town of Broseley. In 1951 the parish had a population of 314. On 1 April 1966 the parish was abolished and merged with Dawley and Much Wenlock.

== See also ==
- Listed buildings in Barrow, Shropshire
- Salopian Art Pottery – art pottery made at Benthall, c.1880–1930
