= Langley Chapel =

Chapel in Shropshire, England

Coordinates: 52.5967°N 2.6830°W

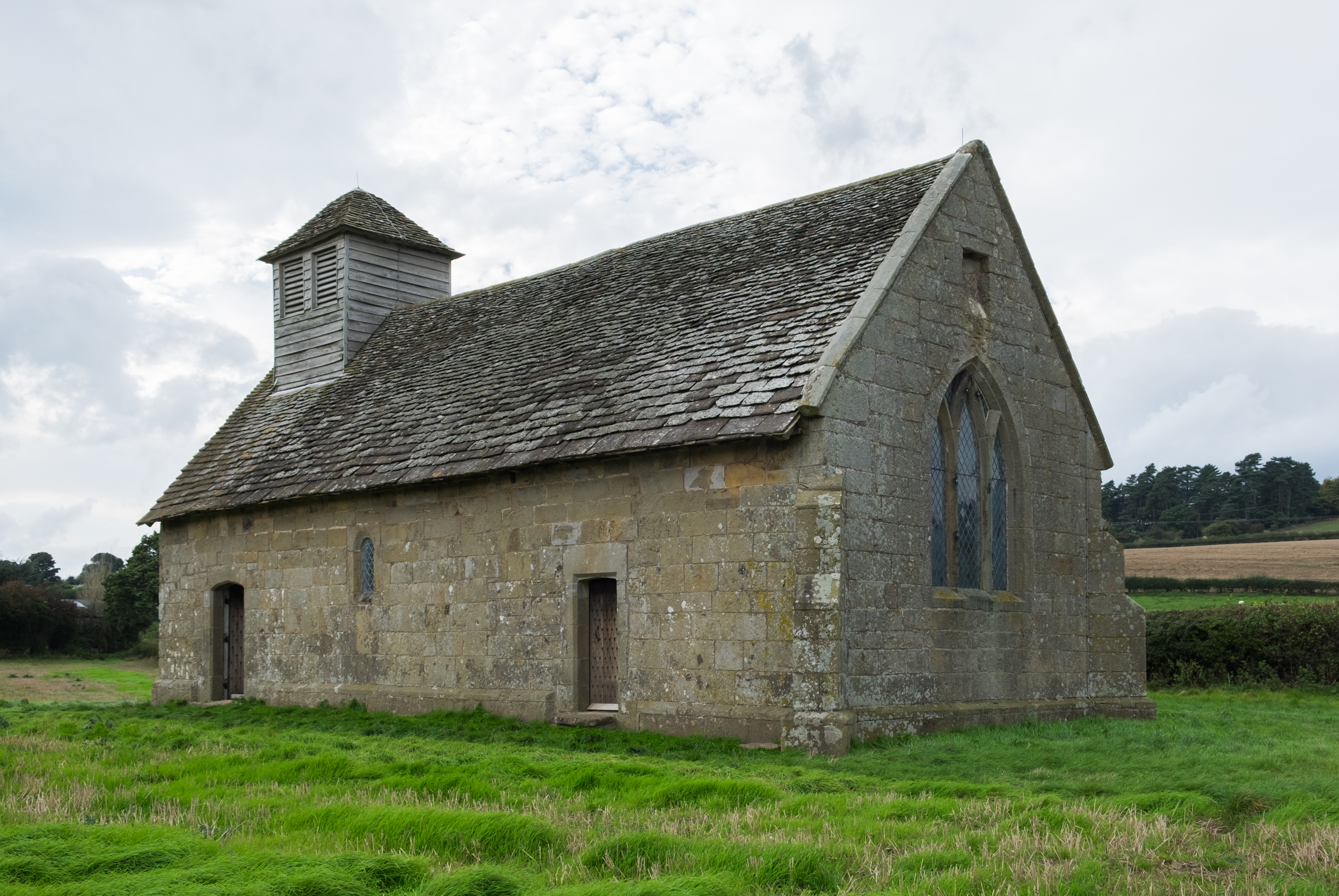
Langley Chapel 2016

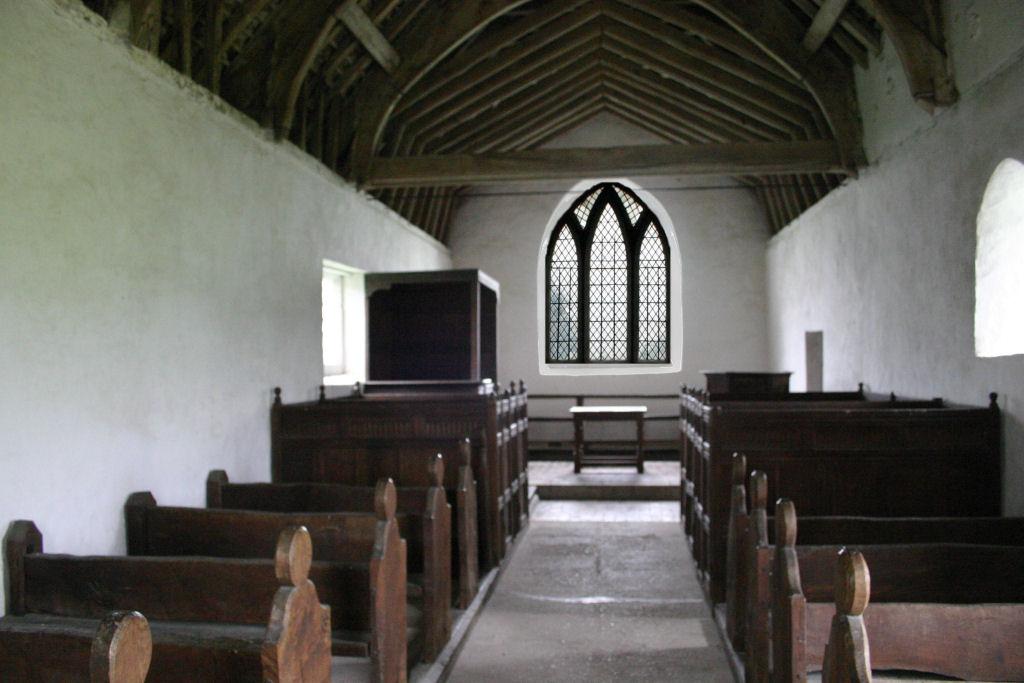
Langley Chapel interior

Langley Chapel is an Anglican church, built in 1601, located in a remote area (the parish of Ruckley and Langley) approximately 1.5 miles to the south of Acton Burnell, Shropshire, England.

It is now in the care of English Heritage, and is notable for having a complete set of original 17th-century wooden furniture, and its lack of a chancel, in line both with its small size and Protestant attitudes to worship. It is one of the few new churches built in England in the Elizabethan period. Despite being built at the start of the 17th century, the east window tracery is in a simplified Gothic style, though the doorways are in plain vernacular styles, one with a flat lintel and another round-headed. The window on the north side is also plain and rectangular. It is a Grade I listed building.

Built on the site of an earlier medieval chapel, it provided worship for the nearby Langley Hall, whose ruins are contained within a nearby private farm. The Chapel was built with wooden box pews, a musicians desk and Communion table bench seats. It has no known dedication.

The 19th century saw the disappearance of Langley Hall, followed by the loss of the local population. The chapel became disused. In 1914, it became one of the first buildings to be taken into the care of the state, the Ministry of Works as it was. The fact it was abandoned meant it escaped modernisation and remains a rare time capsule of the 17th century.

== See also ==
- Grade I listed churches in Shropshire
- Langley, Virginia
