= Hope Bagot =

Hamlet in Shropshire, England

Coordinates: 52.362°N 2.605°W

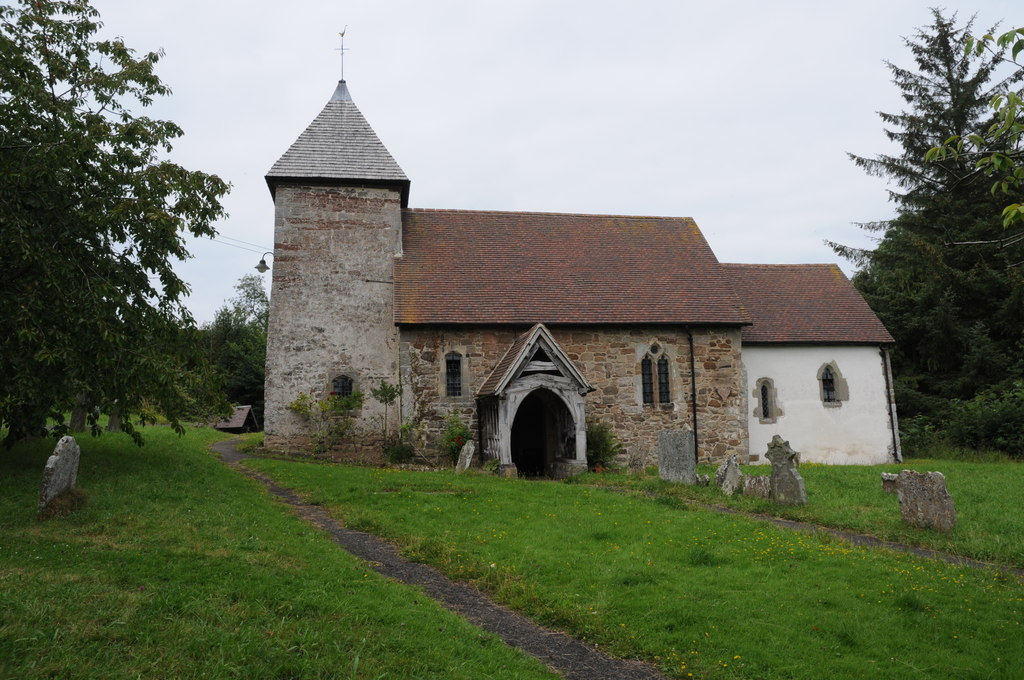
- St John the Baptist church

- Location within Shropshire
- OS grid reference: SO588740
- Civil parish: Hope Bagot
- Unitary authority: Shropshire
- Ceremonial county: Shropshire
- Region: West Midlands
- Country: England
- Sovereign state: United Kingdom
- Post town: LUDLOW
- Postcode district: SY8
- Dialling code: 01584
- Police: West Mercia
- Fire: Shropshire
- Ambulance: West Midlands
- UK Parliament: Ludlow

Hope Bagot is a hamlet and civil parish in Shropshire, England.

It is situated south of Cleehill and the parish is hilly in nature. The market town of Ludlow is 6.0 miles (9.7 km) away.

The parish church in the hamlet is St John the Baptist's Church, which is small and largely Norman in style.

It is a grade I listed building.

The Hill (de Hull/de la Hall) family Court of Hill and Burford were associated with the settlement from the 1200s.

== See also ==
- Listed buildings in Hope Bagot
