= Chelmarsh =

Village and civil parish in Shropshire, England

Coordinates: 52.48829°N 2.41378°W

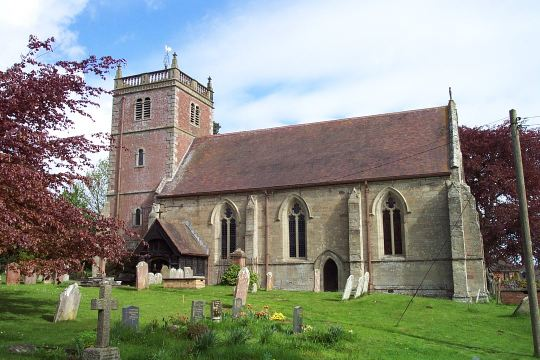
- St Peter's church

- Location within Shropshire
- Population: 518 (2011)
- OS grid reference: SO720879
- Civil parish: Chelmarsh
- Unitary authority: Shropshire
- Ceremonial county: Shropshire
- Region: West Midlands
- Country: England
- Sovereign state: United Kingdom
- Post town: Bridgnorth
- Postcode district: WV16
- Dialling code: 01746
- Police: West Mercia
- Fire: Shropshire
- Ambulance: West Midlands
- UK Parliament: Ludlow

Chelmarsh is a village and civil parish in the English county of Shropshire. It lies 4 miles south of Bridgnorth on the B4555 road to Highley.

== Notable buildings ==
The main feature of the village St. Peter's church. This is an example of the Decorated style and is built on the site of a Norman church, parts of the original building can still be seen.

Other notable buildings include the former Chelmarsh Church of England Primary School, built in 1850 which closed its curriculum doors in July 2002; the building has since been converted into a dwelling. Another is Astbury Hall; a stately home with 320 acres. In 1889 it was destroyed by a fire but rebuilt in 1891. Up until 2017 it was the home to Judas Priest star K.K. Downing who transformed it into a golf course.

== Community ==
The parish has two pubs: 'The Bulls Head' in the main village, and the 'Unicorn' in the hamlet of Hampton, and is also home to Chelmarsh Sports & Social Club and Chelmarsh Parish Hall (www.chelmarshparishhall.co.uk).

Chelmarsh has a very low crime rate and figures average around two minor crimes per month.

== Reservoir ==
Chelmarsh Reservoir attracts many species of wild birds. The reservoir is home to an enthusiastic sailing club (www.chelmarshsailing.org.uk) whose refurbished facilities were opened by the Princess Anne in 2004. Chelmarsh Sailing club encourages people of all ages to learn to sail, it has an expanding fleet of modern sailing boats which are suitable for people of all ages and abilities. It has arguably the best sailing facilities within 50 miles range.

== Transport ==
There is a bus service through the village, operated by Diamond West Midlands. The number 125 bus service operates Mondays to Saturdays, from Bridgnorth to Stourbridge.

== Notable people ==
Rob Hornby (jockey)

== See also ==
- Listed buildings in Chelmarsh
