= Ruckley and Langley =

Civil parish in Shropshire, England

Coordinates: 52.597°N 2.686°W

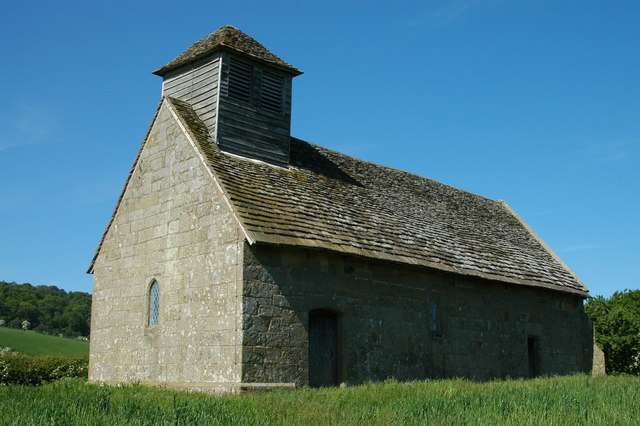
- Langley Chapel

- Location within Shropshire
- OS grid reference: SJ535001
- Civil parish: Ruckley and Langley
- Unitary authority: Shropshire
- Ceremonial county: Shropshire
- Region: West Midlands
- Country: England
- Sovereign state: United Kingdom
- Post town: Shrewsbury
- Postcode district: SY5
- Dialling code: 01694
- Police: West Mercia
- Fire: Shropshire
- Ambulance: West Midlands
- UK Parliament: Shrewsbury and Atcham

Ruckley and Langley is a civil parish in Shropshire, England. It is centred on the hamlets of Ruckley and Langley. The population at the 2011 census can be found under Frodesley.

It is situated south of Acton Burnell and west of Kenley.

Langley Chapel, in Langley, is a small church, built in 1601, and now owned by English Heritage.
