= Barrow, Shropshire =

Hamlet and civil parish in Shropshire, England

Coordinates: 52.597235°N 2.506235°W

Barrow
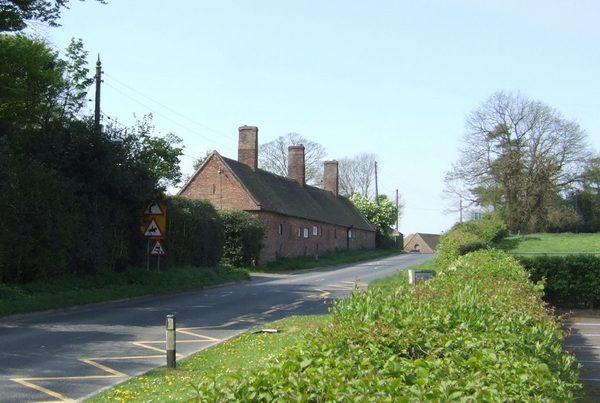
- Almshouses in Barrow, Shropshire

- Location within Shropshire
- Population: 680 (2011)
- OS grid reference: SJ658000
- Civil parish: Barrow
- Unitary authority: Shropshire
- Ceremonial county: Shropshire
- Region: West Midlands
- Country: England
- Sovereign state: United Kingdom
- Post town: Broseley
- Postcode district: TF12
- Dialling code: 01952
- Police: West Mercia
- Fire: Shropshire
- Ambulance: West Midlands
- UK Parliament: Ludlow

Barrow is a hamlet and civil parish in Shropshire, England, some 5 miles south of Telford between Ironbridge and Much Wenlock.

Although Barrow itself consists of a church and just a few dwellings, the parish extends from Broseley to the eastern edge of Much Wenlock; it also includes the hamlets of Willey and Benthall, and the lost settlement of Caughley. According to the 2001 census the parish had a population of 636, increasing at the 2011 Census to 680.

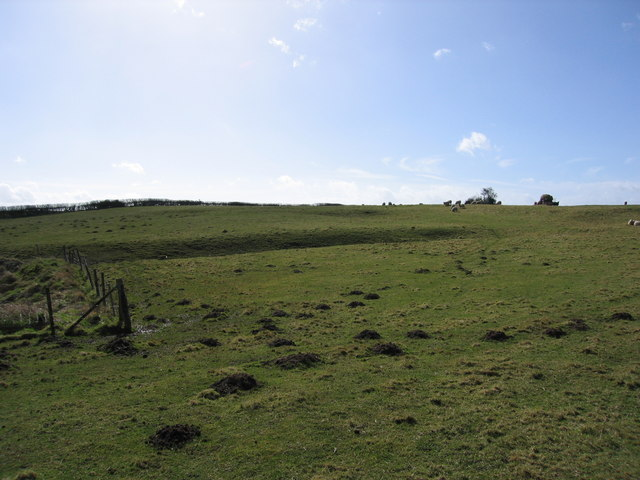
Site of Arlescott village.

Barrow is a short distance south of the site of a lost mediaeval village, Arlescott. The Jack Mytton Way runs through both Arlescott and Barrow.

== See also ==
- Listed buildings in Barrow, Shropshire
