= Shipton (surname) =

Shipton is an English surname. Notable people with the surname include:

- Alyn Shipton (born 1953), American jazz musician
- Cathy Shipton (born 1957), English actress
- Eric Shipton (1907–1977), English mountaineer
- Gabriel Shipton (born 19??), Australian filmmaker and activist; son of John
- Geoff Shipton (born 1941), Australian swimmer
- George Shipton (1839–1911), British trade unionist
- James Shipton (1798–1865), British merchant and politician
- James Ancil Shipton (1867–1926), American army officer
- John Shipton (born c. 1944), Australian activist; father of Gabriel
- Richard Shipton (died c. 1726), pirate active in the Caribbean
- Roger Shipton (1936–1998), Australian politician
- Susan Shipton (born 1958), Canadian film editor
- William Shipton (1861–1941), English cricketer
- Zoe Shipton, British geologist

== See also ==
- Ursula Southeil (c.1488–1561), English seer and prophetess known as Mother Shipton
- Shipton (disambiguation)
- Shipston (surname)
