= Richard More (Mayflower passenger) =

English Mayflower passenger (1614–1690s)

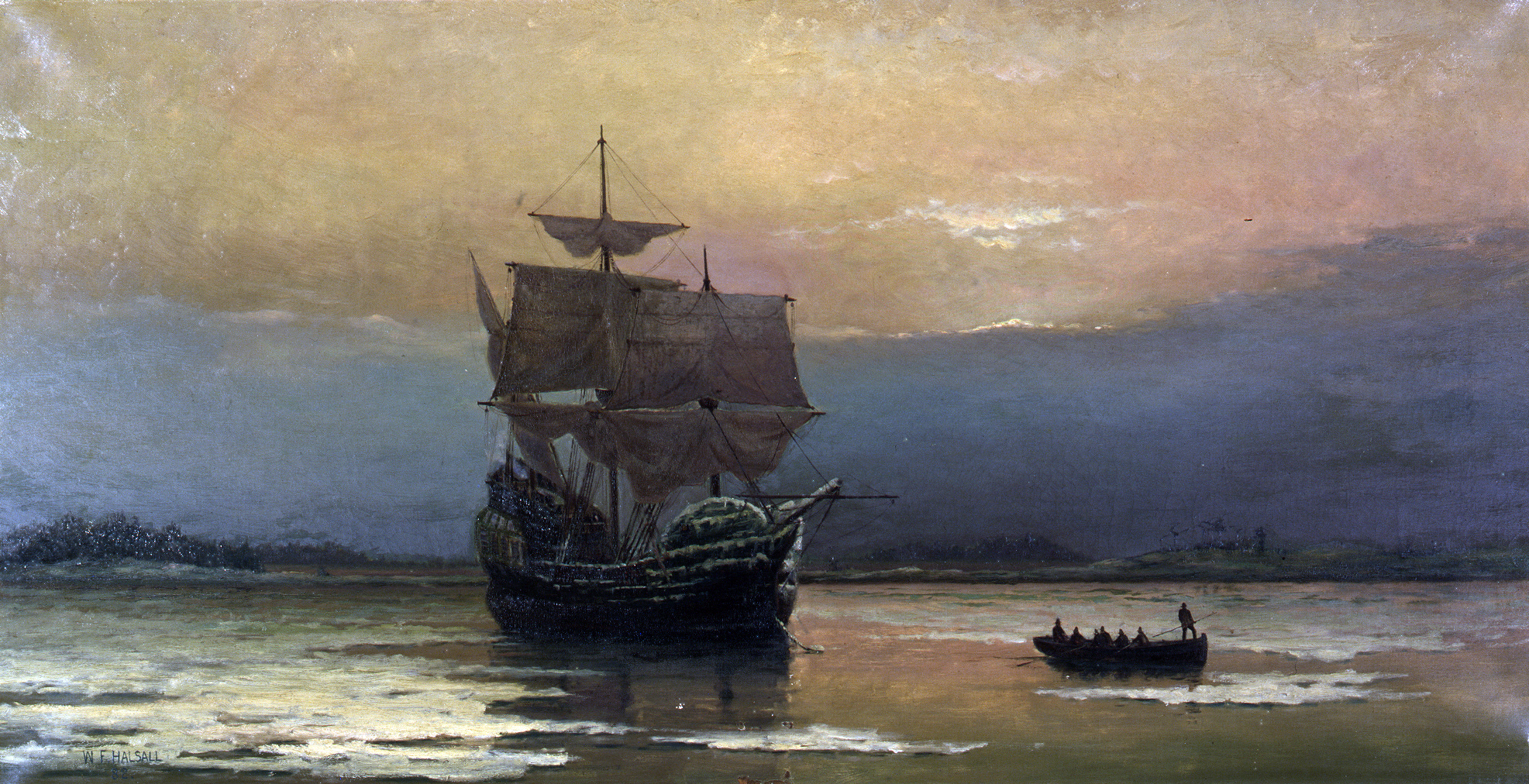
Mayflower in Plymouth Harbor by William Halsall (1882)

Richard More (1614 – c. 1694/1696) was born in Corvedale, Shropshire, England, and was baptised at St James parish church in Shipton, Shropshire, on 13 November 1614. Richard and his three siblings were at the centre of a mystery in early-17th-century England that caused early genealogists to wonder why the More children's father, believed to be Samuel More, would send his very young children away to the New World on the Mayflower in the care of others. It was in 1959 that the mystery was explained. Jasper More, a descendant of Samuel More, prompted by his genealogist friend, Sir Anthony Wagner, searched and found in his attic a 1622 document that detailed the legal disputes between Katherine More and Samuel More and what actually happened to the More children. It is clear from these events that Samuel did not believe the children to be his offspring. To rid himself of the children, he arranged for them to be sent to the Colony of Virginia. Due to bad weather, the Mayflower finally anchored in Cape Cod Harbor in November 1620, where one of the More children died soon after; another died in early December and yet another died later in the first winter. Only Richard survived, and even thrived, in the perilous environment of early colonial America, going on to lead a very full life.

Richard became a well-known sea captain who helped to deliver to various colonies the supplies that were vital to their survival, travelled over Atlantic and West Indies trade routes and fought in various early naval sea battles. He and other Mayflower survivors were referred to in their time as "First Comers", who lived in the perilous times of what was called "The Ancient Beginnings" of the New World adventure.

== More family ==
Much of what is known about Richard's early childhood is through legal documents, more specifically the aforementioned document written in 1622, in response to a petition of Richard More's mother Katherine More (sometimes spelled Katharine, hereafter spelled Katherine) to Lord Chief Justice Sir James Ley, at which time she demands to know what has become of her children. Katherine's father, Jasper More, was master of Larden, a 1000-acre estate between Much Wenlock and Ludlow in Shropshire. Samuel's father, Richard More, was master of Linley, an estate near Bishop's Castle, close to the Welsh border. Both estates are in Shropshire, England.

Jasper's sons died leaving no male heir. The estates were held in an entail whereby inheritance was restricted to male heirs and Samuel's father, but Richard, in the marriage settlement, paid £600 to Jasper More, so there must have been clear title. It was arranged that Katherine would marry her cousin and indeed, on 4 February 1610, (old date style) Katherine, 25, married her cousin, seventeen-year-old Samuel More.

At some point, Samuel began working in London as secretary to Edward, Lord Zouche, privy councillor, diplomat and courtier. Over the next four years, Katherine bore four children: Elinor, Jasper, Richard, Mary. All were baptised at St James parish church in Shipton, Shropshire, with Samuel More as their father.

== Plan, court action, and removal of the children ==
In 1616, Samuel More accused his wife of adultery and, at the direction of his father, Richard, devised a plan to rid himself of Katherine and the children. The adultery was supposedly committed with Jacob Blakeway, a young man near in age to Katherine who lived close by and whose family had been More tenants for several generations. In 1608, Jacob Blakeway and his father Edward, a yeoman, had renewed a lease on a parcel of land owned by Katherine More's father, Jasper More of Larden Hall. The manor of Larden Hall was about half a mile from Brockton where the Blakeway family lived. By a deed dated 20 April 1616, Samuel cut the entail on the Larden estate to prevent any of the children from inheriting. During the long court battle, Samuel would deny that he was the father of the children borne by his wife, Katherine, and stated them to be children of the adulterous relationship. Katherine did not deny her relationship with Jacob Blakeway, stating there was a former betrothal contract with him, and therefore he was her true husband. This would have made her marriage to Samuel invalid. Samuel quotes her words in his declaration, "though she could not sufficiently prove by witnesses yet it was all one before god as she sayed". At that time any of the usual witnesses would likely have been dead.

In that same year, by his own account, Samuel went to his employer and a More family friend, Lord Zouche, Lord President of the Council of Wales, Lord Warden of the Cinque Ports and Privy Counselor, to draw up a plan for the disposition of the children. Zouche had been a member of the Virginia Company and in 1617 he invested £100 in an expedition to the Colony of Virginia, which is where the Mayflower was supposed to have landed. It was his actions that were instrumental in putting the More children on the Mayflower. At that time, children were routinely rounded up from the streets of London or taken from poor families receiving church relief to be used as labourers in the colonies. Any legal objections to the involuntary transportation of the children were over-ridden by the Privy Council, namely, Lord Zouche. Most people thought it a death sentence and, indeed, many did not survive either the voyage or the harsh climate, disease, and scarcity of fresh food for which they were ill-prepared.

Additionally, in 1616, Samuel More, under his father Richard's direction, removed all four children from Larden and placed them in the care of some of his father's tenants near Linley. The removal was shortly after the youngest child had been baptised, which was on 16 April. According to Samuel's statement, the reason he sent the children away was "as the apparent likeness & resemblance … to Jacob Blakeway", quoting from: "A true declaracon of the disposing of the fower children of Katherine More sett downe by Samuell More her husband" together with the "reasons movinge him thereunto accasioned by a peticon" of hers to the Lord Chief Justice of England and it is endorsed, "Katherine Mores Petition to the Lord Chief Justice ...the disposing of her children to Virginia dated 1622". Samuel goes on to state that, during the time the children were with the tenants, Katherine went there and engaged in a struggle to take her children back: "Katharine went to the tenants dwelling where her children had been sequestered, and in a hail of murderous oaths, did teare the cloathes from their backes". There were at least twelve actions recorded between December 1619 and 8 July 1620, when it was finally dismissed.

The statement details that, soon after the denial of the appeal on 8 July 1620, the children were transported from Shipton to London by a cousin of Samuel More and given into the care of Thomas Weston, "…and delivered to Philemon Powell who was intreated to deliver them to John Carver and Robert Cushman undertakers for the associats [sic] of John Peers [Pierce] for the plantacon [sic] of Virginia" in whose home they would be staying while awaiting ship boarding. Thomas Weston and Philemon Powell were both poor choices, and Thomas Weston especially was quite disreputable. Soon thereafter, Powell would become a convicted smuggler and Weston an enemy of the Crown. As the agent of the Merchant Adventurer investment group that was funding the Puritan voyage, Bradford states that Weston caused them many financial and agreement contract problems, both before and after the Mayflower sailed. Weston's Puritan contacts for the voyage were John Carver and Robert Cushman who jointly agreed to find the children guardians among the Mayflower passengers. Carver and Cushman were agents from the Puritans to oversee preparations for the voyage with Robert Cushman's title being Chief Agent, from 1617 until his death in 1625. Within several weeks of the More children's arrival in London, and without their mother Katherine More's knowledge or approval, they were placed in the care of others on the Mayflower, bound for New England.

After the Mayflower sailed, Katherine made another attempt to challenge the decision through the courts. It was this legal action in early 1622 before Chief Justice James Ley which led to the statement from Samuel explaining where he sent the children and why, the historical evidence for Richard More's early history.

== Samuel in the aftermath ==
Samuel More continued to act as secretary to Edward la Zouche and on 11 June 1625, he married Elizabeth Worsley, daughter of Richard Worsley, Esq. of Deeping Gate (in Maxey) in Northamptonshire and cousin to Lord Zouche's second wife, although he was only separated not divorced from Katherine More and neither party was allowed to remarry during the lifetime of the other. In February 1626, Samuel More obtained a royal pardon, possibly to protect himself against accusations of adultery. It is not known if Katherine was still alive at the time of his second marriage.

== Mayflower voyage ==
Richard More and his siblings departed Plymouth, England on the Mayflower 6 September 1620 (Old Style), dangerously late in the season. They endured a rough three months at sea in cramped and unsanitary conditions, eventually landing at Cape Cod Hook (Provincetown Harbor) on 11 November 1620 (Old Style). A number of colonists travelled as indentured servants on the Mayflower. Exactly what explanation was given for the More children's presence is not known, but many homeless waifs from the streets of London were sent to the New World as labourers. The More children were assigned as servants and wards of three adult passengers, as follows:

- Elinor More, Ellen More, age 8, assigned as a servant of Edward Winslow. She died in November 1620 soon after the arrival of the Mayflower at Cape Cod Harbor. Her burial place is unknown and may have been ashore on Cape Cod similarly to her brother Jasper several weeks later. With many others who died that winter, her name appears on the Pilgrim Memorial Tomb, Cole's Hill, Plymouth, Massachusetts.
- Jasper More, age 7, servant of John Carver. He died of a 'common infection' in Dec. 1620 while the Mayflower was in Cape Cod Harbor. He was buried ashore in what is now the Provincetown area. Provincetown has a memorial plaque with his name and that of four others 'who died at sea while the ship lay at Cape Cod Harbor' in Nov./Dec. 1620.
- Mary More, age 4, assigned as a servant of William Brewster. She died sometime in the winter of 1620/1621. Her burial place is unknown, but may have been on Cole's Hill in Plymouth in an unmarked grave as with many others buried there that winter. She is mentioned on the Pilgrim Memorial Tomb in Plymouth, misidentified after Ellen's name as "and a brother (children)" – the statement coming from William Bradford's failing memory years after the event of her death.
- Richard More, age 6, servant of William Brewster. He resided with the Brewster family until about mid-1627 when his term of indentureship expired. This is about the time that his name appears, at age 14, in a census as a member of the Brewster family, in what was called then 'New Plimouth'. By 1628, Richard was in the employ of Pilgrim Isaac Allerton, who was engaged in trans-Atlantic trading.

== Richard's life in the New World ==
Richard was six years old when the Mayflower landed at Plymouth Colony. Immediately upon setting foot on land, he would have worked with all of the others to help gather supplies for food and shelter as well as to bury the dead after the epidemic, which would ultimately leave half of the original passengers dead. In the spring of 1621, he would have attended what has now become known as the first Thanksgiving. In 1627, at the age of 14, Richard is recorded as living at Plymouth Colony.

Nothing is known of Richard during his years living with the Brewster family from 1620 to 1627, except that his name is on a document concerning the division of cattle and other livestock, and that he lived in Salem. In 1635 he is listed as arriving from England on the Blessing, which had sailed from London to Massachusetts Bay. The purpose of this journey to London is unknown. At some point, Richard went to work for Allerton as an apprentice. Under Allerton's apprenticeship, he fished in various locations around Plymouth and Maine, working as crew, and at some point he would become captain of the ships that supplied the new American colonies. On 20 April 1636 Richard More married Christian Hunter who had been a passenger with him on the Blessing They lived at Duxbury for a time before moving to Salem. Richard worked as a retainer and a labourer for Richard Hollingsworth, another passenger from the Blessing who was Christian's guardian and step-father.

By early 1642, Richard joined the Salem church. As a member, he would be allowed a voice and a vote in Salem affairs. Richard had his first two sons, Samuel and Thomas More, baptised.

By about 1640s, and by the age of twenty-four, Richard would have been addressed as Captain of his own ketch and is known to have traded with the colonies, the West Indies, and England. He had sold his twenty acres in Duxbury and moved himself and his family to Salem Neck. He applied for a permit and set up his own fishing stand. Since drinking water was scarce, Richard dug a well on common ground for himself and others to use. He traded tobacco and other merchandise and supplies with Virginia and the West Indies, and made voyages to England. In 1653, he served with his ship in an unsuccessful expedition against the Dutch settlement on the Hudson (later to become New York). In 1653, Captain More was paid for ye Dutch expedition.

Beginning in 1654, for two consecutive years, he took part in two attacks by sea against the French, who were threatening New England's fishing and maritime trade in the lower Hudson River region. In 1654, Richard More served in a successful combined English and New England expedition against the French at Port Royal, the principal settlement of the French colony of Acadia, now Nova Scotia. Captain More was at Port Royal, Nova Scotia, when the French fort was reduced to English Obedience in 1654, and from thence a bell was later brought to Salem in Capt. Moor's Ketch. Thus Richard More contributed to the foundations of New England's maritime greatness.

During this time, Richard received land at Plymouth as an "Ancient Freeman". The land was granted by the General Court and purchased from the Indians. He obtained lots near the Fall River and was one of the purchasers of lots in Swansea. In 1673, he sold land at Mattapoisett (he is referred to as) he of Massachusetts Colony on 1 March 1667/8; and formerly of Plymouth and now of Salem sold lots in Swansea and Sepecan on 30 August 1673.

The Staple Act 1663, which stated, among other things, that the shipping of European goods to the colonies except through England or Wales was forbidden, forced hard times upon both colonial ship captains and the colonists. The restrictions threatened the very survival of the colonists and, to survive, the captains had to be extremely creative in their shipping manifests. The Navigation Acts, along with the continued taxation of the colonies into the next century, brought about the growth of isolationism, which eventually resulted in the American Revolution.

In 1665, Richard rescued the colonists at the newly established colony at Cape Fear. The ship that was supposed to bring supplies failed to arrive and, consequently, the people were dying of starvation and the lack of adequate protection against the weather. It was an extremely hazardous area for ships but, upon learning of the situation, Richard brought a shipment of food and supplies to aid the desperate colonists. When Richard's old sailing friend, Richard Starr, was murdered, he took on the responsibility of Starr's three children. In his fifty years as a mariner Richard had never lost a vessel, nor had any sailor brought charges against him.

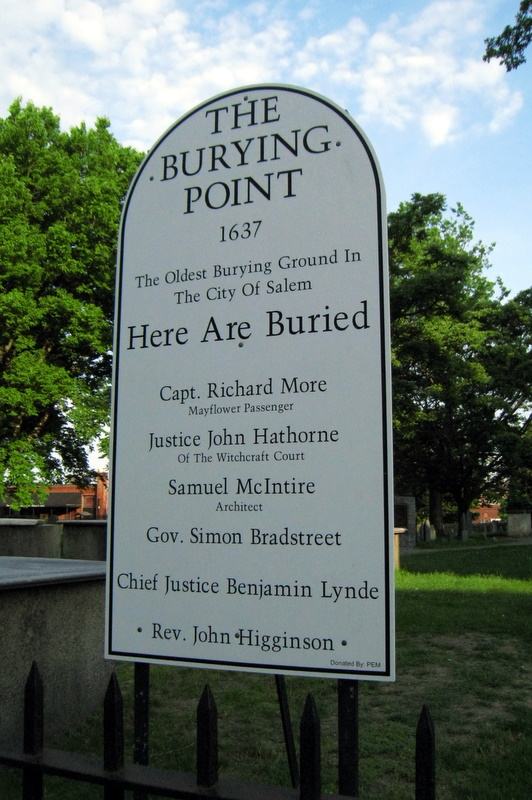
Capt. Richard More memorial near his grave in Salem, Massachusetts

Richard served alongside Joseph Dudley during the Great Swamp Fight in December 1675, a massacre of the Narragansett people living around Narragansett Bay.

In later life, Richard suffered from financial hardship. On 1 July 1688, he was brought before the Salem church elders for 'gross unchastity with another man's wife'. The elders had spoken to him privately on several occasions as Richard represented a member of the Ancient Days and they wanted to maintain a special place in their history. He was publicly sanctioned and excommunicated from the church. Richard accepted the judgment and made a public repentance and, according to documents, was restored to the church in 1691. According to David Lindsay, historian and author, the pastor who punished him was Reverend Nicholas Noyes. Noyes was a man whom Richard knew well and would become directly involved with in his later life. Noyes was the same man who would lead the campaign against the so-called witches of Salem.

Richard More is buried in Salem. There is documentary evidence that he was alive in 1694 and dead in 1696. His gravestone gives an age of 84, but he deposed in 1684 that he was aged seaventy yeares or thereabouts indicating he was unsure of his birth date. The gravestone in the old Salem burial ground gives a date of 1692.

== Marriages ==
Richard More married three times:

- Christian Hunter on 20 October 1636 in Plymouth Colony. She was born ca. 1615 in possibly Southwold, Suffolk, England, and was baptised there on 13 August 1615 at (possibly) St Edmund's Church. She died on 18 March 1676 in Salem, Massachusetts. Her parents were Thomas Hunter (d.1623/7) and Susan Gentleman. She came to America in 1635 on the ship Blessing with her mother and step-father Richard Hollingsworth.
- Elizabeth Woolnough on 23 October 1645 in St Dunstan's, Stepney, London. The record of that event notes that "Richard Moore of Salem, Mariner" married Elizabeth Woolnough of Limehouse district, London. The Stepney parish register states that Elizabeth was the daughter of Benjamin Woolnough, having been baptised in St Dunstan's on 21 December 1623. Benjamin Woolnough was a trans-Atlantic ship captain, sailing to Virginia. The last time that Elizabeth's name appears on documents is on 7 April 1646, the day after Richard More failed to appear at the Kings Session for Peace, when she identified herself to the High Court of Admiralty as "Elizabeth, wife of Richard Moore of Stepney." Her appearance in court was to answer a charge against More, who had probably fled the country, for being intoxicated in the company of a woman of easy virtue as well as a child of about eight years, thought to have been his daughter Elizabeth. There is no evidence that Elizabeth Woolnough ever came to America. No further record.
- Jane Hollingsworth Crumpton. Born c. 1631. Died 5/8 October 1686 in Salem, Massachusetts. Married before 23 May 1678 in Salem, Massachusetts. Daughter of Richard L. Hollingsworth, Sr. and Susan Gentleman Woodbury Hunter Hollingsworth. She was the widow of Samuel Crumpton, who was killed by Indians in 1675.

== Children ==
Richard More and Christian Hunter had seven children:

- Samuel More, baptised 6 March 1642 in Salem, Mass. Died after March 1677. Married Sarah ____.
- Thomas More, baptised 6 March 1642 in Salem, Mass. Died after 25 November 1692.
- Caleb More, baptised 31 March 1643/4 in Salem, Mass. Died 4 January 1678/9 in Salem, Mass.
- Richard More (jr.), baptised 2 January 1647/8 in Salem, Mass. Died 1 May 1696. Married Sarah ______. 6 children – 3 sons, 2 daughters and 1 unknown.
- Joshua More, baptised 3 March 1646 in Salem, Mass. Died between 1660–1675.
- Susanna More, baptised 12 May 1650 in Salem, Mass. Died after 30 October 1728 in Salem, Mass. Married (1) c.1675 Samuel Dutch, (2) c.1694 Richard Hutton (3) 1714 John Knowlton. She had 4 daughters with Samuel Dutch.
- Christian More, baptised 5 September 1652 in Salem, Mass. Died 30 May 1680 in Salem, Mass. Married 31 Aug 1676 Joshua Conant. 1 son.

Richard More and Elizabeth Woolnough had one daughter:

- Elizabeth More, born ca. 1638 in probably London, about 7–8 years prior to her parents' marriage in 1645. She was baptised at St Dunstan's Church, Stepney, London on 2 March 1646, five months after her parents' marriage in 1645. Nothing more is known about her other than a record of an "Elizabeth More", of about her age, appearing briefly in Salem about 1660, and marrying a local shipwright named Richard Clarke. They soon after moved to Long Island where they appeared at Southampton, Long Island in 1661, as husband and wife.

A recently discovered document suggests that Elizabeth left posterity a trail of breadcrumbs for her identity in the names of her children. The "Pennsylvania and New Jersey, U.S., Church and Town Records, 1669–2013" for Elizabeth Clark reads "RICHARD CLARK, shipwright, living in Southold LI in 1675; removed with wife and children to ET ca 1678; d 1697 m. Elizabeth letters of adm Feb 16 1725 Essex Liber A/238 issues: Elizabeth, Richard, John, Joshua, Samuel, Ephraim, Thomas and Benjamin.

This group of names in fact, reflects the most important people in the lives of Richard and Elizabeth (More) Clark. • Elizabeth Woolnough, Elizabeth's mother • Richard More, Elizabeth's father • Joshua Woolnough, probably Elizabeth's uncle and close friend of Richard More • Samuel More, Richard More's 'legal' father • Thomas Clark, most genealogists consider this to be the name of Richard Clark's father • Benjamin Woolnough, Elizabeth's maternal grandfather

== Death and burial ==
According to the Mayflower Society records, he died in Salem after 19 March 1693/4, but before 20 April 1696. There is documentary evidence that he was alive in 1694 and dead in 1696. His gravestone gives an age of 84, but it is more likely that Richard was unsure of his birth date. The gravestone in the old Salem burial ground gives a date of 1692. But the date, and additional words 'a Mayflower pilgrim', were added at some point between 1901 and 1919, and provoked some outraged reaction in the local press.

Richard More is buried in what was known as the Charter Street Burial Ground but is now the Burying Point/Charter Street Cemetery in Salem, Massachusetts. He is the only Mayflower passenger to have his gravestone still where it was originally placed sometime in the mid-1690s.

== Sources ==
- Massachusetts Society of Mayflower Descendants
- The Mayflower Society
- Mayflower Bastard: A Stranger amongst the Pilgrims, by David Lindsay, (New York: St. Martins Press, 2002),
- The Mayflower Descendant. Donald Harris, PhD., (Boston: Massachusetts Society of Mayflower Descendants), published in vol. 43, (July 1993), and vol. 44, (January & July 1994).
- "The Origin of the Mayflower Children: Jasper, Richard and Ellen More." Anthony R. Wagner. C.V.O., D. Litt. FASG, Richmond Herald, College of Arms, London, England. (Boston: The New England Historical and Genealogical Register, July 1960), vol. 114
- The London Times. 30 June 1959. pp. 163–168. Anthony R. Wagner. C.V.O., D. Litt. FASG, Richmond Herald, College of Arms, London, England.
