= Shipton =

Shipton may refer to:

== Places ==
- Shipton, Gloucestershire
- Shipton, North Yorkshire
- Shipton, Shropshire
- Shipton Bellinger, Hampshire
- Shipton Brook, Buckinghamshire
- Shipton Gorge, Dorset
- Shipton Lee, Buckinghamshire
- Shipton-on-Cherwell, Oxfordshire
- Shiptonthorpe, East Riding of Yorkshire
- Shipton-under-Wychwood, Oxfordshire
- Shipton, Quebec, a former municipality that is now part of Danville, Quebec
- Shipton, Kansas, a community in the U.S.

== Other ==
- Shipton (surname)
- Shipton Hall, an historic house in Shropshire
