= John Shipton =

Australian activist (born c. 1944)

- Citizenship: Australia
- Occupation: Architect
- Known for: WikiLeaks Party
- Partner: Christine Assange (1970)
- Children: 3, including Julian Assange and Gabriel Shipton

John Shipton (born circa 1944) is an Australian anti-war activist and architect, best known as the biological father of Julian Assange (who was born Julian Hawkins, and later adopted the surname of his stepfather). He founded the WikiLeaks Party and was involved with the creation of the website WikiLeaks and helped with WikiLeaks for years. He was criticised for meeting with President Bashar al-Assad during a visit to Syria as part of the WikiLeaks Party.

While Julian Assange was imprisoned in the UK, he campaigned for his release and acted as an ambassador for him and was featured in the documentary movie Ithaka, produced by his son Gabriel Shipton.

== WikiLeaks ==
In 1996, Shipton rejoined Assange's life and had many "dense and lengthy" conversations with Assange during which Assange revealed his plan for WikiLeaks. Assange later registered the WikiLeaks address using Shipton's name. Shipton helped with WikiLeaks for years.

== WikiLeaks Party ==
On 23 April 2013, Shipton submitted registrations for the WikiLeaks Party to the Australian Electoral Commission. Shipton stated that the party "stands for what Julian espouses — transparency and accountability in government and of course human rights".

=== 2013 voting issues ===
The party's campaign was thrown into turmoil just weeks before the 2013 election when members objected strongly to the party's voting preferences (see single transferable vote). In New South Wales, the far-right Australia First Party was placed above the Greens while in Western Australia the National Party was placed above Greens Senator Scott Ludlam, a strong supporter of WikiLeaks and Assange. According to the Sydney Morning Herald, it was understood that WikiLeaks had "gone into a complex preference deal with micro parties, mainly right-wing, in a bid to get a candidate into the senate". The WikiLeaks Party blamed an unspecified "administrative errors" and announced an independent review would be performed.

According to Assange's running mate Leslie Cannold, a campaign staffer received a telephone call that contradicted the statement by the WikiLeaks Party that the review would be immediate and independent. Instead, the review would be delayed until after the election and would not be independent. The review was unable to interview anyone other than Shipton, but took submissions from figures like Greg Barns. The reviewer also had "limited or no access to WLP official transcripts, minutes of National Council meetings and official emails/correspondence" and was unable to verify what he was told. The independent review rejected the claim that the decision was an "administrative error".

When National Council members complained, CEO John Shipton attempted to work without them and create a new power base. Leslie Cannold, Assange's running mate in Victoria, resigned along with four other members of the National Council and several major volunteers. Cannold said she could not remain a candidate because doing so would implicitly make a statement that the WikiLeaks Party was "a democratically run party that both believes in transparency and accountability, and operates in this way". Julian Assange responded, saying "I’m not sure I’d call it chaos, although of course it [the resignations] is a significant event". Alison Broinowski said she talked to John Shipton and decided the decisions were a mistake and that "no skulduggery was in evidence". Shipton termed the National Council "raving fucking lunatics" and threatened legal action.

After the 2013, Shipton started a national tour to assess interest in continuing the party.

=== Syria visits ===
In December 2013, a delegation from the WikiLeaks Party, including its chairman John Shipton, visited Syria and met with President Bashar al-Assad with the goals of demonstrating "solidarity with the Syrian people and their nation" and improving the party's understanding of the country's civil war. The visit was criticised by both major parties of Australian politics and considered a "propaganda coup" for the Syrian regime. In a statement issued shortly before the visit, the WikiLeaks Party stated that it opposed outside intervention in the war, endorsed a negotiated peace process and described reports of the Ghouta chemical attack by forces loyal to al-Assad in August 2013 as being "unsubstantiated" and comparable to the concerns over the Iraqi weapons of mass destruction program prior to the Iraq War.

The meeting with Assad was criticized by the Australian Prime Minister, Foreign Minister, Syrian activists and WikiLeaks supporters. The visit was also criticised by the Federal Opposition, including independent experts, the Greens and senior members of Labor. Shipton stated that the meeting with al-Assad was "just a matter of good manners" and that the delegation had also met with members of the Syrian opposition. However, these meetings with the opposition have not been verified. Shipton said he was going to sue Tony Abbott and Julie Bishop for criticising the party’s delegation to Syria for $5 million in damages but never sued. WikiLeaks said it "did not know or approve" of the visit.

In December 2013, Shipton said he wanted to open an office for the WikiLeaks Party in Syria. According to Shipton, he asked Syrian journalists to become their Damascus "transparency office" and send back "proper information" about the conflict, but said in April 2014 that those plans were ended and the emphasis was shifted to Kyiv. Shipton added he and other members of the WikiLeaks Party would return to Syria to deliver medical supplies bought in Iran to the Red Crescent in Damascus, but said they would not meet Assad again.

=== Missing funds ===
In March 2014, Jamal Daoud said that the WikiLeaks National Council was denied access to the WikiLeaks Party’s books and copies of financial statements. He also said John Shipton told him the group was $70,000 in debt despite having no employees and no advertising. Daoud said it was "like a family convenience store". Shipton refused requests for interviews and comments.

== Julian Assange campaign ==
Shipton campaigns and acts as an ambassador for Assange. In 2019, The Age reported that Shipton regularly lobbied minor parties including The Greens calling for his son's release. In 2021, he was featured in the documentary Ithaka, produced by his son Gabriel Shipton. In July 2022, he said that the campaign to free his son had taken all of his money, and he had sold a house in Newton. He said he continued to campaign using money from other sources, including donations and book-selling. In August 2022, he attended Parliament House to talk about Assange's case and frustration that he hadn't been able to meet with the prime minister, the foreign affairs minister, or the attorney general, despite requests. In September 2022, he addressed Mexico’s Senate and accepted the key to Mexico City on behalf of his son. In May 2023, he said the campaign to free Assange was on the "cusp of success" after prime minister Anthony Albanese and opposition leader Peter Dutton said Assange's detention had gone on too long.

== Personal life ==
Shipton met Christine Ann Hawkins at a Vietnam War rally in 1970 when he was 26. By late 1970, they separated and she was pregnant with Julian Assange. Shipton says he had no feeling for family life and did not see Assange until 1996 when he was 25. He raised another son, Gabriel Shipton, in Sydney and has a daughter in Melbourne.
