= Richard More (Parliamentarian) =

English landowner and politician (1576-1643)

Richard More (c. 1576 – 6 December 1643) was an English landowner and politician who sat in the House of Commons from 1640 to 1643. He supported the Parliamentary cause in the English Civil War.

== Family background ==
More was the son of Robert More of Linley in Shropshire. In the early sixteenth century Richard More's grandfather had moved south to make his fortune at King Henry's court, but, in 1583, the family moved back to Shropshire. Richard More's birth date is not known, but is thought to be 1576, when the family had an estate in Barby, Northamptonshire.

At ten years old Richard More could read the Old Testament in Hebrew. Despite this academic promise Richard did not go on to university, possibly because he married early, in 1592, to Sara Harris, daughter of a Shrewsbury merchant. In 1602 Richard More was already master of the More estates, and in 1603 he added the manor of Downton, a significant estate just over the border in Herefordshire. His father Robert died in 1604

Richard More's eldest son, Samuel, married a cousin, Katherine, in 1611. The marriage settlement was unusual in that Richard paid £600 sum to Katherine's father, and took control of the family's estate, at Larden near Much Wenlock, immediately after the marriage. At some time after this marriage, Samuel More became secretary to Edward, Lord Zouche, one of the commissioners of the Virginia Company., During this time a rift developed between Samuel More and his wife with allegations of adultery by him stating that she had conceived four children with a longtime lover. What followed was four rancorous years and twelve court appearances from 1616 to 1620 in which Samuel's father Richard played a part, with him keeping the four children from their mother pending disposition of this case. By 1620, upon counsel from Lord Zouche among others, it was decided to place the children as indentured servants bound for Virginia - and they were placed about the ship Mayflower. This all took place without the knowledge of their mother. As it happened, winter weather drove the ship north to Cape Cod Harbor where three of the four children perished that first winter. Of the More children sent on the Mayflower, only five-year-old Richard More survived.

== Later life ==
Richard More was active in trade in Bishop's Castle. He was High Sheriff of Shropshire in 1619, and was elected to the corporation of the town in 1623. He was a Puritan and wrote on religious themes. After a local case of murder in 1633, a Shrewsbury clergyman wrote a pamphlet arguing that the murder was the result of Puritan fanaticism. This prompted More to write a pamphlet in reply titled "True Relation of the Murders" although he was refused licence to print the pamphlet until 1641. More was bailiff of the borough in 1637.

In April 1640, More was elected Member of Parliament for Bishop's Castle in the Short Parliament. He was re-elected MP for Bishop's Castle for the Long Parliament in November 1640 and sat until his death in 1643. He strongly supported the Parliamentary side and contributed plate to the cause. He was a committee member under the Scandalous Ministers Act and a member of the Shropshire Sequestration committee. In 1643 he published a translation of Clavis Apocalyptica by Joseph Mede. He died the same year.

Parliament of England
Vacant Parliament suspended since 1629	Member of Parliament for Bishop's Castle; 1640–1643; With: Robert Howard	Succeeded by Isaiah Thomas; John Corbet
