= Samuel More =

English parliamentarian army officer, legal parent of Mayflower children

Samuel More (1593–1662) was an English landowner known for his involvement in two significant historical events: the controversial removal of his children aboard the Mayflower; in 1620, and his active role as a Parliamentarian during the English Civil War.

Samuel's father, Richard More, was master of Linley, an estate near Bishop's Castle close to the Welsh border. Samuel married his cousin Katherine More, whose father, Jasper More, was master of Larden, a 1,000-acre estate between Much Wenlock and Ludlow in Shropshire.

The mystery of why Samuel More sent his children on the dangerous journey on the Mayflower was not explained until 1959, when Jasper More, a descendant of Samuel, prompted by his genealogist friend, Sir Anthony Wagner, searched his attic and discovered a 1622 document which detailed the adultery of the children's mother, Katherine More. That admission led Samuel to believe that the children were not his offspring. In 1616, Samuel accused his wife Katherine of adultery and bearing four children with Jacob Blakeway, a neighbour. Under his father's direction, Samuel removed the four children from their home. Four years later, without their mother's knowledge, they were transported to the New World aboard the Pilgrim Fathers' ship, the Mayflower, in the guardianship of other passengers. Only one of the children survived the hardships of the first winter in Plymouth.

== Marriage ==
Jasper More had no surviving male heir, leaving his estates under an entail restricting inheritance to male descendants. However, Samuel More's father, Richard More, paid £600 to Jasper More as part of the marriage settlement, securing clear title to the estates. Subsequently, an arrangement was made for Jasper's daughter Katherine to marry her cousin Samuel More. On 4 February 1610 (Old Style), Katherine More, aged 25 and Jasper's last unmarried daughter, married her 17-year-old cousin Samuel More.

Samuel subsequently took employment in London as secretary to Lord Zouche, a Privy Councillor, diplomat, and courtier. Between 1612 and 1616, Samuel and Katherine had four children, all baptized at St James' Parish Church in Shipton, Shropshire: Elinor (baptized 24 May 1612), Jasper (baptized 8 August 1613), Richard (baptized 13 November 1614), and Mary (baptized 16 April 1616). Official baptismal records listed Samuel More as the children's father.

== Legal actions and removal of the children ==
In 1616, Samuel More accused his wife Katherine of adultery with Jacob Blakeway, a neighbor. Following this accusation, under his father's direction, he initiated legal proceedings concerning the paternity and custody of the four children.The adultery was supposedly committed with Jacob Blakeway, a young man near in age to Katherine who lived close by and whose family had been More tenants for several generations. In 1608, Jacob Blakeway and his father Edward, a yeoman, had renewed a lease on a parcel of land owned by Katherine More's father, Jasper More of Larden Hall. The manor of Larden Hall was about half a mile from Brockton, where the Blakeway family lived. By a deed dated 20 April 1616, Samuel cut the entail on the Larden estate to prevent any of the children from inheriting. During the lengthy court battle, Samuel denied that he was the father of the children borne by his wife, Katherine, and claimed they were children of an adulterous relationship instead. Katherine did not deny her relationship with Jacob Blakeway, stating that there was a former betrothal contract with him, and therefore he was her true husband. This would have made her marriage to Samuel invalid. Samuel quotes her words in his declaration, "though she could not sufficiently prove by witnesses yet it was all one before god as she sayed". At that time, any of the usual witnesses would have been dead.

In that same year, by his own account, Samuel went to his employer and a More family friend, Lord Zouche, Lord President of the Council of Wales, Lord Warden of the Cinque Ports and Privy Counselor, to draw up a plan for the disposition of the children. Zouche had been an active member of the Virginia Company. In 1617, he invested £100 in an expedition to the Colony of Virginia, where the Mayflower originally intended to land. His actions were instrumental in putting the More children on the Mayflower. At that time, children were routinely rounded up from the streets of London or taken from low-income families receiving church relief to be used as labourers in the New World colonies. Any legal objections to the involuntary transportation of the children were overridden by the Privy Council, namely, Lord Zouche. Most people thought it a death sentence, and indeed, many did not survive either the voyage or the harsh climate, disease, and scarcity of fresh food, for which they were ill-prepared.

Additionally, in 1616, Samuel More, under his father Richard's direction, removed all four children from Larden and placed them in the care of some of Richard's tenants near Linley. The removal was shortly after the youngest child had been baptised, which was on 16 April. According to Samuel's statement, the reason he sent the children away was "as the apparent likeness & resemblance … to Jacob Blakeway", quoting from "A true declaracon of the disposing of the fower children of Katherine More sett downe by Samuell More her late husband together with the reasons movinge him thereunto accasioned by a peticon of hers to the Lord Chief Justice of England and it is endorsed, Katherine Mores Petition to the Lord Chief Justice ...the disposing of her children to Virginia dated 1622". Samuel goes on to state that, during the time the children were with the tenants, Katherine went there and engaged in a struggle to take her children back: "Katharine went to the tenants dwelling where her children had been sequestered, and in a hail of murderous oaths, did teare the cloathes from their backes." There were at least twelve actions recorded between December 1619 and 8 July 1620, when it was finally dismissed.

The statement details that soon after the denial of the appeal on 8 July 1620, the children were transported from Shipton to London by a cousin of Samuel More and given into the care of Thomas Weston, "…and delivered to Philemon Powell who was intreated to deliver them to John Carver and Robert Cushman undertakers for the associats (sic) of John Peers (Pierce). for the plantacon (sic) of Virginia…" in whose home they would be staying while awaiting ship boarding. Thomas Weston and Philemon Powell were both poor choices and Thomas Weston especially was quite disreputable. In later years, Weston would become an enemy of the Crown. As the agent of the Merchant Adventurer investment group that was funding the Puritan voyage, Bradford states that Weston caused them many financial and agreement contract problems, both before and after the Mayflower sailed. Weston’s Puritan contacts for the voyage were John Carver and Robert Cushman, who jointly agreed to find the children guardians among the Mayflower passengers. Carver and Cushman were agents from the Puritans to oversee preparations for the voyage, with Robert Cushman's title being Chief Agent from 1617 until he died in 1625. Within several weeks of the More children's arrival in London, and without their mother Katherine's knowledge or approval, they were in the care of others on the Mayflower, bound for New England.

After the Mayflower sailed, Katherine made another attempt to challenge the decision through the courts. This legal action in early 1622 before Chief Justice James Ley led to Samuel's statement explaining where he sent the children and why, the historical evidence for his parents' history.

== The More children on the Mayflower ==
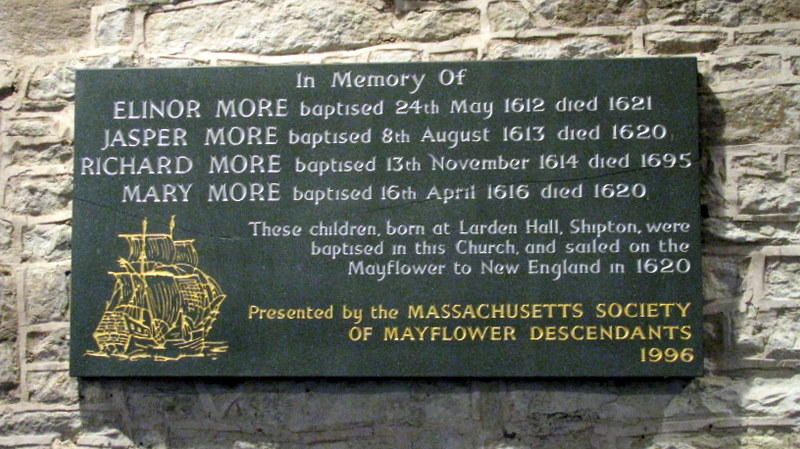
Mayflower plaque in St James' Church in Shipton, Shropshire, commemorating the More children's baptism. Courtesy of Phil Revell.

At the time of the Mayflower's sailing in September 1620, the More children were aged between four and eight and classed as indentured servants. They were designated to be labour in the colony of (Northern) Virginia (present-day Long Island), which was the Mayflower's intended destination until winter weather forced the ship to anchor at Cape Cod. Several colonists travelled as paying passengers on the Mayflower. Exactly what explanation was given for the More children's presence on the ship, unattended by any legal guardians, is not known, as many homeless waifs from the streets of London were sent to the New World as laborers.

Three of the Mayflower Pilgrims eventually took responsibility for the children as indentured servants:

- Elinor More, or Ellen More, age 8, was assigned as a servant of Edward Winslow. She died in November 1620, soon after the arrival of the Mayflower at Cape Cod Harbor. Her burial place is unknown and may have been ashore on Cape Cod, similar to her brother Jasper, who died several weeks later. Alongside many who died that winter, her name appears on the Pilgrim Memorial Tomb, Cole's Hill, in Plymouth, Massachusetts.
- Jasper More, age 7, was assigned as a servant of John Carver. He died of a "common infection" in December 1620 while the Mayflower was in Cape Cod Harbor. He was buried ashore in what is now the Provincetown area. Provincetown has a memorial plaque with his name and that of four others "who died at sea while the ship lay at Cape Cod Harbor" in the winter of 1620.
- Mary More, age 4, was assigned as a servant of William Brewster. She died sometime in the winter of 1620/1621. Her burial place is unknown but may have been on Cole's Hill in Plymouth in an unmarked grave, as with so many others buried there that winter. As with her sister Ellen, she is recognized on the Pilgrim Memorial Tomb in Plymouth, misidentified after her sister's name as "and a brother (children)" – the mistaken reference to her as "a brother" comes from William Bradford's failing memory years after her death.
- Richard More, age 6, was also assigned as a servant of William Brewster. The only one of the More children to survive the first winter, he resided with the Brewster family until about mid-1627, when his term of indentureship expired. This is about when his name appeared, at age 14, in a census as a member of the Brewster family, in what was then called "New Plimouth". By 1628, Richard was employed by Pilgrim Isaac Allerton, who was engaged in trans-Atlantic trading.

Samuel More continued to act as secretary to Lord Zouche, and on 11 June 1625, he married Elizabeth Worsley, daughter of Richard Worsley, Esq. of Deeping Gate (in Maxey) in Northamptonshire and cousin to Lord Zouche's second wife, although he was only separated, not divorced, from Katherine More. At the time, there was no legal divorce, as it later became known in the 20th century, and neither party was allowed to remarry during the lifetime of the other. In February 1626, Samuel More obtained a royal pardon, possibly to protect himself against accusations of adultery. It is not known if Katherine was still alive at the time of his second marriage.

== Hopton Massacre ==
During the English Civil War, Samuel More fought for Parliament. He commanded a garrison at Hopton Castle in Shropshire, one of the few castles to be held for Parliament in that county. More was commandant of the castle when, in 1644, it was besieged by a force of Cavaliers led by Sir Michael Woodhouse, with a force of about 500. More's garrison numbered around 30 men, and the result of such an action was inevitable. Without external support, More would be forced to surrender. It seems that Colonel More was offered quarter (the option of surrender) twice and refused. After this, accounts differ.

Samuel's own account states that he finally surrendered once the Cavaliers had breached the castle walls, whereupon his men were brutally slaughtered.

Other accounts state that, after a three-week siege, More delayed surrendering until the bailey had been taken and the entrance to the keep was on fire. Under the laws of war as they were practised at that time, such a surrender was at the discretion of the besieging forces, who had taken significant casualties. More had waited too long to surrender. It seems that Sir Michael Woodhouse chose not to accept the surrender and ordered (or at least did not prevent) the killings. As his men were being killed, Samuel More was taken to Ludlow and was later given his freedom in a prisoner exchange.
