= Jacob Blakeway =

Jacob Blakeway (born July 1583) was at the centre of a historic incident in seventeenth century England which caused a great scandal and led to the four More children being sent to America on the Mayflower in 1620.

For many years genealogists wondered why the More children's father sent young children to the New World on the Mayflower, in the care of others. In 1959, the mystery was solved. Jasper More, a descendant of Samuel More, prompted by his genealogist friend Anthony Wagner, searched and found in his attic a 1622 document, which detailed the legal disputes between Katherine and Samuel More and what actually happened to the More children. It is clear that Samuel did not believe the children to be his offspring. He arranged for them to be sent to the Colony of Virginia.

== Background ==
Jacob Blakeway was born in July 1583 and baptised on 25 July 1583 at Stanton Long Parish Church in Corvedale. He was the eldest son of Edward Blakeway (d.1610) and his wife Anceret (d.1631 – the name is from the Welsh Angharad). By 1608, the Blakeway family had been tenants of the estate of Jasper More of Larden Hall for many generations. The manor was about half a mile from Brockton, where the Blakeways lived. A track way called Blakeway Hollow leads out of Much Wenlock, and over the Wenlock Edge to Apedale, where there is still a Blakeway Farm and Blakeway Cottage.

== Scandal ==
Jacob and Katherine More were close in age and may have known each other in their youth. The sons of Jasper More, Katherine More’s father, died leaving him will no male heir. The estates were entailed whereby inheritance was restricted to male heirs. Samuel's father, Richard, in the marriage settlement paid £600 to Jasper More, so there must have been clear title. It was arranged that Katherine would marry her cousin and indeed, on 4 February 1610, (old date style) Katherine, 25, the last unmarried daughter of Jasper, married her cousin, 17-year-old Samuel More.

Over the next four years, Katherine bore four children: Elinor, baptised 24 May 1612, Jasper, baptised 8 August 1613; Richard, baptised 13 November 1614; Mary, baptised 16 April 1616. All were baptised at St. James parish church in Shipton, Shropshire.

In 1616 Jacob Blakeway was accused of adultery with Katherine More, the wife of Samuel More. The husband, Samuel More, repudiated the four children from the marriage. In a later statement, Samuel More wrote that the reason was the "apparent likeness and resemblance … to Jacob Blakeway". The removal seems to have occurred in late April or May 1616, because the youngest child had only just been baptised, on 16 April at Shipton.

== Pursued through the courts ==
Jacob and Katherine did not deny the affair. On the contrary, Jacob and Katherine claimed a pre-contract, a formal betrothal prior to the marriage with Samuel. Blakeway and Katherine applied to the Chancellor of the Consistory Court of the Diocese of Hereford in June 1616, in Samuel's words, "to obteine a sentence of divorce and for license to entermarry". It was actually an annulment they were requesting based on their stated pre-contract. If this pre-contract could have been proved, the couple would have had a formidable case. The law at the time recognised a betrothal as a contract to marry, even if there had been no religious ceremony. Two witness statements were all that were required, but the likely witnesses to Jacob and Katherine's betrothal were all dead.

In 1616, Samuel More, under his father Richard's direction, removed all four children from Larden and placed them in the care of some of Richard More's tenants near Linley. The removal occurred in late April or May, because, according to Samuel's statement to the judge, the youngest child had only just been baptised on 16 April at Shipton. In March 1617, Jacob obtained a royal pardon to "remit, condone, release and pardon all and singular charges of adultery or fornication with a certain Katherine Moore, wife of Samuel Moore of Larden".

After the children were removed from Larden Hall, Jacob Blakeway faced further action. According to Samuel More’s account, he was cited before the High Commission Court and Council of the Marches. Samuel’s testimony states that Jacob and Katherine continued to live at Larden during this period (1616–1618) and the next action against Jacob was an accusation of trespass. Samuel More’s account states that Jacob was brought before Justice Warburton in the 1618 Lent assizes, and that Samuel was awarded damages of £400. Samuel goes on to say that Jacob appealed to the Kings Bench, but that the judgment was confirmed, whereupon Jacob "to prevent execution fled". Nothing is known of Blakeway after this, and Samuel, in his declaration, makes no mention of any efforts to find him.

Katherine More continued to try to regain custody of her children through the courts but, after a four-year legal battle, the case was lost on approximately 8 July 1620. Following the final court action, Katherine's four children were transferred, without her knowledge or consent, to the care of various pilgrim families soon to depart for the New World on a ship called the Mayflower. In Samuel More’s statement, he wrote that he took this action because of the: "great grief of such a spurious brood", and the children were dispatched to America in order to "provide for the education and maintenance of these children in a place remote from these parts where these great blotts and blemishes may fall upon them". No record of Katherine is found after June 1622.

== The More children and the Mayflower ==
At the time of the Mayflower's sailing in September 1620, the children were aged between four and eight. The indentured servants were intended to be labour in the colony of (Northern) Virginia (present day Long Island). This was the Mayflower's intended destination until winter weather forced the ship to anchor at Cape Cod. A number of colonists travelled as paying passengers on the Mayflower. Exactly what explanation was given for the More children's presence is not known. Many homeless waifs from the streets of London were to be sent to the New World as labourers. The children were amongst this group.

- Elinor More, Ellen More, age 8, assigned as a servant of Edward Winslow. She died in November 1620 soon after the arrival of the Mayflower at Cape Cod Harbor. Her burial place is unknown and may have been ashore on Cape Cod similarly to her brother Jasper several weeks later. With many others who died that winter, her name appears on the Pilgrim Memorial Tomb, Cole's Hill, Plymouth, Massachusetts.
- Jasper More, age 7, servant of John Carver. He died of a 'common infection' in Dec. 1620 while the Mayflower was in Cape Cod Harbor. He was buried ashore in what is now the Provincetown area. Provincetown has a memorial plaque with his name and that of four others 'who died at sea while the ship lay at Cape Cod Harbor' in Nov./Dec. 1620.
- Mary More, age 4, assigned as a servant of William Brewster. She died sometime in the winter of 1620/1621. Her burial place is unknown, but may have been on Cole's Hill in Plymouth in an unmarked grave as with so many others buried there that winter. As with her sister Ellen, she is recognised on the Pilgrim Memorial Tomb in Plymouth, misidentified after her sister's name as "and a brother (children)" – the statement of calling her "a brother" mistakenly coming from William Bradford's failing memory years after the event of her death.
- Richard More, age 6, servant of William Brewster. He resided with the Brewster family until about mid-1627 when his term of indentureship expired. This is about the time that his name appears, at age 14, in a census as a member of the Brewster family, in what was called then 'New Plimouth'. By 1628, Richard was in the employ of Pilgrim Isaac Allerton, who was engaged in trans-Atlantic trading.

They arrived at Provincetown Harbor in November 1620 and tragedy struck soon after the ships arrival with the death of Elinor More in November 1620; Jasper More died one month later in December 1620 of "a common infection", and Mary More died that first winter of 1620/1621.

After the Mayflower sailed, Katherine made another attempt to challenge the decision through the courts, and it was this legal action in early 1622 before Chief Justice James Ley which led to the statement from Samuel explaining where he sent the children and why, which provided the main historical evidence for the events.
