= Ithaka (film) =

Documentary film about Julian Assange's incarceration

- Directed by: Ben Lawrence
- Produced by: Gabriel Shipton
- Starring: Stella Assange, John Shipton
- Music by: Brian Eno
- Production company: Shipton House
- Release date: November 7, 2021 (Sydney Film Festival)
- Countries: Canada, United Kingdom
- Language: English

Ithaka is a 2021 Australian documentary film, which depicts the incarceration of the WikiLeaks founder, Julian Assange, through the experience of his wife Stella Assange and his father John Shipton. It was produced by his half-brother Gabriel Shipton. It premiered at the Sydney Film Festival on November 7, 2021.

== Production ==
Ithaka was produced by Julian Assange's half-brother Gabriel Shipton. In 2022, Gabriel Shipton approached the Australian director Ben Lawrence to make a film about John Shipton's efforts to help Assange. Lawrence said he hoped the film would encourage Assange supporters:

It really was a family film. And as much as that creates subjectivity, I think I really leant into that and the film was built from the premise of love – and the film shows that. The film is an attempt is to try and show someone through the people who love them, and the people trying to prosecute them.

During filming, Lawrence and Shipton lived together in close quarters. Lawrence said he had to earn Stella Assange's trust and "had to be very gentle and very careful about what was said, how we said it, what we filmed," and that he always checking in with the Assange family for clearance. The production was partly funded by grants. The music was composed by Brian Eno, a supporter of Assange.

== Reception ==
Two reviews from The Guardian gave Ithaka three out of five and called it intriguing. A third, from Peter Bradshaw, gave it four out of five and said "this film is effectively an answer to Laura Poitras' critical documentary Risk from 2016, which revealed Assange's vanity and high-handedness." The Los Angeles Times wrote that Ithaka "isn't as effective an advocacy doc as it could be, sometimes feeling trapped between wanting to intellectualize with onscreen text and contextualized history and looking for observational moments that crystallize the pain and concern for the Assange family". The Los Angeles Times compared Ithaka unfavorably to Risk's willingness to explore disillusionment with Assange, writing that Ithaka seemed "almost afraid to address controversies that could be argued aren't as important as what a successful prosecution of Assange ominously portends for journalism".

The New York Times wrote that Ithaka insisted Assange was the victim of a smear campaign, but that "what exactly those smears are the film declines to specify or debunk". The newspaper called it frustrating because "the film's weak assertions hurt more than they help. Even those inclined to support Assange" would be annoyed by its flimsy reporting, "deception with evasions, half-truths and speculative accusations." According to Variety, the documentary "is less about the man than the cause" of defending journalism. Variety criticised the documentary's presentation, saying "the whole movie is a kind of family affair... I'm sorry, but family affairs don't tend to make for good documentaries." Variety wrote that Ithaka "takes a narrow view of Assange's troubles, one that ultimately merges with a black-and-white view of his politics: He's right, the American government is wrong" and compared it unfavorably to We Steal Secrets: The Story of WikiLeaks.

The Times gave it three stars and called it fascinating but said it was undone by "John Shipton, through whose eyes the film effectively unfolds." According to The Times, Shipton talked freely "about the geopolitical implications of WikiLeaks and his son's journalistic idealism" but was "fractious, refuses to answer personal questions and consistently slides into grand, self-regarding, allusion-filled prolixity". The Financial Times gave it three out of five but called it "partisan" and "agitprop", saying "the makers' partiality shows." They described it as "Julian Assange's story told through the eyes of his family," and that "it is most worthwhile when director Ben Lawrence admits that." The Green Left praised the documentary but noted that "Shipton and Moris are the ones who provide the balancing acts" in the narrative. Ithaka won Best Documentary and Best Direction at the Capricorn Film Festival.
