= WikiLeaks Party =

2013–2015 Australian political party

- Chairman: Julian Assange
- Founded: 2 July 2013
- Dissolved: 23 July 2015
- Headquarters: Victoria, Australia
- Membership (2013): 2,010
- Ideology: Left-libertarianism
- Political position: Left-wing
- Colours: Blue

Website
- wikileaksparty.org.au (archived)

The WikiLeaks Party was a minor left-libertarian political party in Australia between 2013 and 2015. The party was created in part to support Julian Assange's failed bid for a Senate seat in Australia in the 2013 election. The party won 0.62% of the national vote. At the time Assange was seeking refuge in the Ecuadorian embassy in London. The WikiLeaks Party national council included Assange, Matt Watt, Gail Malone, Assange's biological father John Shipton, Omar Todd and Gerry Georgatos.

The party was heavily criticised for meeting with then-president Bashar al-Assad during a trip to Syria. It experienced internal dissent over its governance and electoral tactics and was deregistered due to low membership numbers in 2015.

== Formation ==
Assange's decision to run for the Australian Senate was announced via the WikiLeaks Twitter account in March 2012. Assange said that Prime Minister Julia Gillard's attacks on WikiLeaks contributed to his decision to run for the Senate, and that if he won the seat the US would end the grand jury investigation against him and the British government would follow suit "the political costs of the current standoff will be higher still". The intent to form a WikiLeaks Party was announced by Assange in late 2012 and Assange stated that the party was to be a vehicle for his candidacy for a seat in the Australian Senate in the 2013 election.

On 23 April 2013, the WikiLeaks Party submitted its registrations to the Australian Electoral Commission. The party had over 1,300 fee-paying members. The application was accepted and the party was registered as a political party on 2 July 2013 and the party launched later that month. Assange said he planned to launch the WikiLeaks Party outside of Australia, and suggested it could expand to US, India or Britain.

The party was involved in Glenn Druery's Minor Party Alliance around the 2013 federal election, but left after deciding not to preference as per Druery's advice.

=== Party platform ===
The WikiLeaks Party subscribed to a libertarian ideology. Specific policies for the 2013 election included "promoting free information and protection for whistle-blowers". The WikiLeaks Party said they were against compulsory vaccination and tried to appeal to the Australian Vaccination Network, an anti-vaccination lobby group. Their policies on asylum seekers, the environment, health and education were unclear.

Assange said he could be described as a libertarian, and that he would use parliamentary privilege to overcome court-imposed gag orders. He also said it was important to protect people and small businesses from large corporations and government, and that there were "strong arguments on all sides" of issues like euthanasia and same-sex marriage. Assange said he would protect private data by requiring the ASIO to apply for a judicial warrant and table an annual report about oversea data sharing. CEO John Shipton stated that the party "stands for what Julian espouses — transparency and accountability in government and of course human rights". Assange himself has said the WikiLeaks Party would combine "a small, centralised leadership with maximum grassroots involvement" and that the party would advance WikiLeaks' objectives of promoting openness in government and politics and that it would combat intrusions on individual privacy.

Assange was reported as saying that he envisioned the WikiLeaks Party as bound together by unswerving commitment to the core principles of civic courage nourished by understanding and truthfulness and the free flow of information and one that will practise in politics what WikiLeaks has done in the field of information. The Constitution of the WikiLeaks Party lists objectives, including the protection of human rights and freedoms; transparency of governmental and corporate action, policy and information; recognition of the need for equality between generations; and support of Aboriginal and Torres Strait Islander self-determination. The WikiLeaks Party criticised the Telstra Group's relationship with the FBI and US Department of Justice.

== 2013 election ==
The party fielded candidates for the Australian Senate in the states of New South Wales, Victoria and Western Australia. Two polling experts rated the WikiLeaks Party's electoral chances as highly unlikely.

The WikiLeaks Party candidates for the 2013 election were:

Victoria

- Julian Assange, WikiLeaks founder and publisher
- Leslie Cannold, who resigned on 21 August 2013; university academic and legalised abortion supporter
- Binoy Kampmark, law professor and writer

New South Wales

- Kellie Tranter, lawyer and human rights activist
- Alison Broinowski, former Australian diplomat and academic

Western Australia

- Gerry Georgatos, a former Greens candidate who resigned from the Greens in November 2009 after a falling out with some of the WA Greens; university researcher, journalist and human rights campaigner
- Suresh Rajan, former president of the Ethnic Communities Council WA and president of WA Epilepsy

Assange failed in his bid for a Senate seat. The WikiLeaks Party picked up 0.62% of the national vote, Assange garnered 1.18% of the primary vote in Victoria, and the WikiLeaks Party picked up 0.8% in New South Wales and 0.71% in Western Australia.

Christine Milne, leader of the Australian Greens, was positive about the emergence of the WikiLeaks Party as part of a move away from Australia's two-party system. However, the Greens said they had no intention of stepping aside for Assange in the Victoria Senate election. Similarly, the Socialist Equality Party reaffirmed its intention to defend Assange against persecution, but refused to endorse the WikiLeaks Party, stating that its position represented the "interests of the working class".

Professor Anne Twomey, an expert on Australian constitutional law at the University of Sydney, suggested that if Assange were elected, this could be found invalid in the event of a legal challenge if a court ruled that his relationship with Ecuador breached the prohibition against the election of people "under any [acknowledgement] of allegiance, obedience or adherence to a foreign power".

=== Voting issues ===
The party's campaign was thrown into turmoil just weeks before the 2013 election when members objected strongly to the party's group voting tickets. In New South Wales, the far–right Australia First Party was placed above the Greens, while in Western Australia the National Party was placed above Greens senator Scott Ludlam, a strong supporter of WikiLeaks and Assange. The Sydney Morning Herald reported it was understood that WikiLeaks had "gone into a complex preference deal with micro parties, mainly right-wing, in a bid to get a candidate into the senate". The WikiLeaks Party blamed an unspecified "administrative errors" and announced an independent review would be held, and Gerry Georgatos defended the decision to place the Nationals ahead of the Greens.

Leslie Cannold, Assange's running mate in Victoria, said a campaign staffer received a phone call that contradicted the statement by the WikiLeaks Party that the review would be immediate and independent. Instead, the review would be delayed until after the election and would not be independent. The review was unable to interview anyone other than Shipton, but took submissions from figures like Greg Barns. The reviewer also had "limited or no access to WLP official transcripts, minutes of National Council meetings and official emails/correspondence" and was unable to verify what he was told. The independent review rejected the claim that the decision was an "administrative error".

The claim that it was an administrative error was also contradicted by leaks from within the party and several outlets. According to leaked emails, Assange was behind the preference deal, and attempted to give himself veto rights and to turn the National Council into a rubber stamp. He also suggested that he was entitled to make himself the president of the party because he had founded it, although there is no leader or president under the WikiLeaks Party constitution. Jamal Daoud, a member of the National Council, said the preferences were directed personally by Assange. Greg Barns, a former election adviser to the party, said that was a "nasty allegation with no substance whatsoever" and other sources said Barns made the decision.

Dr. Daniel Mathews, who helped Assange co-found the WikiLeaks website, said "the initial view was that the party had submitted a mistake," but "subsequent evidence has come to light that it may not have been entirely a mistake." Ludlam said "There's no administrative error. One of our guys was told last week well before this decision got locked away that that was what they were going to do." Greens staffer Max Phillips said The WikiLeaks Party's NSW deputy registered officer Cassie Findlay told him about the decision a week before it became public.

When National Council members complained, CEO John Shipton attempted to go around them and create a new power base. Leslie Cannold resigned along with four other members of the National Council and several key volunteers. Cannold said she could not remain Assange's running mate in Victoria because doing so would implicitly make a statement that the WikiLeaks Party was "a democratically run party that both believes in transparency and accountability, and operates in this way". Julian Assange responded said "I'm not sure I'd call it chaos, although of course it [the resignations] is a significant event". Alison Broinowski said she talked to John Shipton and decided the decisions were a mistake and that "no skulduggery was in evidence".

The party published a short, inconclusive review by a party member five months later. Former member Gary Lord responded with a comprehensive 20-page report fully examining the party's failures.

== Foreign connections ==
=== Syria visits ===
In December 2013, a delegation from the party, including its chairman John Shipton, visited Syria and met with President Bashar al-Assad and other officials with the goals of demonstrating "solidarity with the Syrian people and their nation" and improving the party's understanding of the country's civil war. The trip was heavily criticised by both sides of Australian politics and considered a "propaganda coup" for the Syrian regime. In a statement issued shortly before the visit, the WikiLeaks Party stated that it opposed outside intervention in the war, supported a negotiated peace process and described reports of the Ghouta chemical attack by forces loyal to al-Assad in August 2013 as being "unsubstantiated" and comparable to the concerns over the Iraqi weapons of mass destruction program prior to the Iraq War.

The meeting with President al-Assad was attended by National Council members John Shipton and Gail Malone and by academic Tim Anderson. Former National Council member Jamal Daoud (who had resigned from the Greens over differences) was their translator. Daoud was a well-known opponent of the anti-Assad insurgency and expressed support for Assad on Twitter and on his blog. The delegation also met with Prime Minister Wael al-Halqi, Deputy Foreign Minister Faisal Miqdad, Higher Education Minister Malek Ali, the Speaker of the Syrian People's Assembly Jihad al-Laham and Information Minister Omran al-Zoubi.

The meeting with Assad was criticised by the Australian Prime Minister, Foreign Minister, Syrian activists and WikiLeaks supporters. The visit was also criticised by the Federal Opposition, including independent experts, the Greens and senior members of Labor. Prime Minister Tony Abbott said the meeting was an "extraordinary error of judgment" and Lowy Institute for International Policy executive director Michael Fullilove called it "extremely unwise, ill-considered and really unforgivable". Foreign Affairs Minister Julie Bishop said it was "excessively reckless" for the WikiLeaks Party "to try and insert itself in the appalling conflict in Syria for their own political ends". Bishop said "it risks undermining the sanctions regime we have in place, and it risks aligning Australia with one side of the conflict in Syria, which is something we would not do".

Shipton stated that the meeting with al-Assad was "just a matter of good manners" and that the delegation had also met with members of the Syrian opposition. However, these meetings with the opposition have not been verified. Shipton said he was going to sue Tony Abbott and Julie Bishop for criticising the party's delegation to Syria for $5 million in damages but never sued. WikiLeaks said it "did not know or approve" of the visit.

In December 2013, Shipton said he wanted to open an office for the WikiLeaks Party in Syria. According to Shipton, he asked Syrian journalists to become their Damascus "transparency office" and send back "proper information" about the conflict. In April 2014, Shipton said those plans were scrapped and the focus was shifted to Kyiv. Shipton added he and other members of the WikiLeaks Party would return to Syria to deliver medical supplies bought in Iran to the Red Crescent in Damascus, but said they would not meet Assad again.

=== Foreign propaganda ===
After meeting with Syrian officials in December 2013, WikiLeaks Party national councillor Jamal Daoud said he would use information from the regime to publish stories of alleged atrocities by the rebels, despite not having seen any evidence to support some of the claims and not following up on it. Sheik Fedaa al-Majzoub, a respected cleric in Sydney, said that the WikiLeaks Party may have been used by senior ministers of the country's regime after Daoud repeated claims made by Information Minister Omran al-Zoubi about al-Majzoub. Daoud said he was still waiting for evidence to support his claims and did not follow it up.

In February 2014, the WikiLeaks Party was criticised after it began republishing articles from al-Manar, the propaganda unit of Hezbollah. One article republished by the WikiLeaks Party alleged that Israel was trying to "strengthen and deepen their relations with the terrorist groups" fighting Assad by treating more than 700 "terrorists" at a hospital. Daoud defended the information and said he didn't "have a problem with the source of information if that information is credible" and that he thought al-Manar was credible than Israeli and Australian sources for information about Palestinian territories and Syria.

== 2014 election ==
The WikiLeaks Party contested the 5 April re-run of the disqualified 2013 Senate election (Western Australia component). The prior year's lead Senate candidate Gerry Georgatos recommended to the National Council that he step down for Assange to take the lead Senate position for Western Australia and hopefully get elected. In February, the National Council learned that Assange would be ineligible to contest. Georgatos rejected continuing on as the endorsed candidate and asked that the membership be surveyed as to their preferred candidate. More than 500 WikiLeaks members completed the survey and Georgatos was endorsed as the lead candidate with West TV producer Tibor Meszaros at number 2 and journalist Lucy Nicol at number 3. One hour before the close of nominations, Georgatos withdrew for "unforeseen personal reasons" and Tibor Meszaros was consequently elevated to lead candidate. On 14 April, the AEC draw for the ballot of 33 parties (77 candidates) drew the WikiLeaks Party first.

== Funding ==
The WikiLeaks Party tried to raise $700,000 for election funds. Assange said American banks blocked donations to the party, and that Bank of America blocked donations he tried to make. The WikiLeaks Party raised almost $5000 in Bitcoin, and said they "don't know where the donations are coming from". This caused questions about compliance with Australian law, which requires disclosures about large donations and the number of people who made donations.

=== Missing funds ===
In March 2014, Jamal Daoud said that the WikiLeaks National Council was denied access to the party's books and copies of financial statements. He also said John Shipton told him the group was $70,000 in debt despite having no employees and no advertising. Daoud said it was "like a family convenience store." Shipton refused requests for interviews and comments.

== Deregistration ==
The WikiLeaks Party was deregistered by the Australian Electoral Commission on 23 July 2015 for lack of members under s.137(4) of the Electoral Act. Members of The WikiLeaks Party objected, saying the AEC's methods were out of date because they only counted landlines. Deputy Chairman and National Council Director of The WikiLeaks Party, Omar Todd said "The current electoral system makes it extremely difficult for smaller political parties to exist and will only get worse if the overhaul of the political system happens in the near future."

== See also ==
- Fusion Party (Australia)
