= Listed buildings in Shipton, Shropshire =

Shipton is a civil parish in Shropshire, England. It contains nine listed buildings that are recorded in the National Heritage List for England. Of these, one is listed at Grade I, the highest of the three grades, two are at Grade II*, the middle grade, and the others are at Grade II, the lowest grade. The parish contains the village of Shipton and the surrounding area. In the parish is Shipton Hall, a country house that is listed together with associated structures. The other listed buildings are a church originating from the 12th century and houses, the earliest of which are timber framed, one with cruck construction.

== Key ==
Grade	Criteria
I	Buildings of exceptional interest, sometimes considered to be internationally important
II*	Particularly important buildings of more than special interest
II	Buildings of national importance and special interest

== Buildings ==
Name and location	Photograph	Date	Notes	Grade
St James' Church; 52.52281°N 2.64718°W		12th century	The tower was added later, the chancel was rebuilt and the south porch was added in 1589. The chancel and the porch are in gritstone with freestone dressings, and the rest of the church is rendered. It consists of a nave, a south porch, a chancel, and a west tower. The tower has three stages, the top stage is timber framed, and it has a pyramidal roof. The nave and chancel arch are Norman.	II*
Moor Hall; 52.53146°N 2.63305°W	—	1571 (possible)	The hall range and the parlour wing of an Elizabethan house, the rest of which has been demolished. It is in stone with a tile roof and an L-shaped plan. The north wing is gabled, and the windows are mullioned and transomed.	II
Dovecote, Shipton Hall; 52.52402°N 2.64683°W		1590s (possible)	The dovecote in the grounds of the hall is in stone and has a circular plan. It has a conical tiled roof and a cupola, and the walls are about 4 feet (1.2 m) thick.	II*
Shipton Hall; 52.52366°N 2.64730°W		c. 1598	A country house that was remodelled and extended in the 18th century. It is built in yellow limestone, and has two storeys and attics and a basic H-shaped plan, with a main range and projecting gabled wings. In the right angle is a four-storey porch tower containing a round-arched doorway with a detached pediment above. Most of the windows are mullioned and transomed.	I
Thatch Cottage; 52.52063°N 2.64539°W	—	Early 17th century (probable)	The cottage is in timber framing with cruck construction and brick, on a stone plinth, and it has a thatched roof. There is one storey and an attic, a cruck gable, and the windows are modern casements.	II
Bullshead Farm House; 52.52205°N 2.64381°W	—	17th century	The farmhouse, which was altered later, is partly timber framed and partly in stone. It has an irregular plan, two storeys, and the windows are casements.	II
Barn, Shipton Hall; 52.52366°N 2.64606°W	—	17th century	The barn is partly timber framed, partly in brick, and partly in stone. It has a tile roof, and the openings are plain.	II
Stables, Shipton Hall; 52.52366°N 2.64641°W		1756–57	The stable block is in stone with a hipped tile roof. There are two storeys and nine bays. The central three bays project forward and contain a tall arch, two oeil-de-boeuf windows under a pediment containing another circular window. On the roof is a wooden cupola.	II
New House; 52.51255°N 2.66543°W	—	Late 18th century	A stone house with a plastered front and a hipped slate roof. There are three storeys and three bays. On the front is a small porch with pillars, and the windows are sashes.	II
