= Greg Barns =

Australian

Gregory Joseph Barns SC (born 9 April 1962) is an Australian barrister, author, political commentator, mining company director and former political candidate based in Hobart, Tasmania. He is an advisor to Julian Assange and WikiLeaks and was the national campaign director for the WikiLeaks Party.

== Early life and education ==
Barns was educated at De La Salle College, Malvern and Monash University, where he graduated with a Bachelor of Arts in 1984 and a Bachelor of Laws in 1985.

== Legal career ==
Barns was admitted to practice and called to the Victorian Bar in 1986, and to the Tasmanian Bar in 2003. He is also admitted to practice in New South Wales and Western Australia. He worked full-time as a barrister from 1986 to 1989, and from 2003. He took silk in Tasmania in May 2020.

Barns represented Ezzit Raad in the 2008 trial of twelve men around Abdul Nacer Benbrika charged with terrorism-related offenses. SBS Television produced a one-hour documentary, The Trial, about the case, focussing on Barns' involvement. In 2013, he started working pro bono on the Julian Assange legal case for the Assange Campaign.

== Political career ==
Barns was an adviser to New South Wales premier Nick Greiner (1989–90); Victorian opposition leader Alan Brown (1990–91); and Tasmanian premier Ray Groom (1993–96). He then served as Chief of Staff to Federal Finance Minister John Fahey from 1996 to 1999.

Barns was the political campaign director of the Australian Republican Movement's 1999 referendum campaign and he succeeded Malcolm Turnbull as ARM chair in 2000.

In 2002, Barns was disendorsed as the Liberal candidate for the Tasmanian seat of Denison, due to his criticism of the Howard government's asylum-seeker policies. Blaming John Howard, Barns said, "Dissent within the party is just not tolerated."

Criticising the Liberal Party, Barns commented on, "The weakness of the liberal wing of the party and in particular supposedly liberal ministers like Robert Hill, for example, or (former attorney-general) Daryl Williams, a range of them who thought of themselves as being liberals who have been prepared to go along for the ride".

He later joined the Australian Democrats for around two years.

In 2013, Barns was the Wikileaks Party campaign adviser for the Australian federal election when claims were made about party lack of transparency and accountability by Leslie Cannold, resulting in her resignation from the party along with a number of National Council members and volunteers.

== Writing ==
Barns is the author of What's Wrong with the Liberal Party? (2003) and Selling the Australian Government: Politics and Propaganda from Whitlam to Howard (2005). More frequent contributions appear in On Line Opinion, Crikey and the Hobart Mercury on issues pertaining to sport, law and politics (including the Australian federal election in 2007).

=== Human rights ===
In 2019, Barns told Australians to put aside their opinions of Julian Assange and consider his actions. He told the press: “At the end of the day we need to remember what is it he exposed, for which he’s been prosecuted. He revealed war crimes and he’s being punished for it.” In 2020, he called for Australians to support Assange during his extradition hearing in the UK. Barns said Assange was "facing an effective death penalty" for revealing "the war crimes of the US".

Barns has made calls for Australia to adopt a Bill of Rights for the protection of its citizens and journalists. In a 2020 opinion piece published in the Mercury, he warned of the potential human rights violations that could follow public acceptance of the Australian government's COVIDSafe app. The app is intended to facilitate the contact-tracing of people who become infected with the disease, but he warns that data could be used for other purposes by other parties including police, immigration and intelligence agencies in Australia and the USA.

== Law reform ==
In a 2012 article called "Australia's pointless and deadly drugs crackdown" he said "We are killing, injuring and hurting young Australians who use illicit drugs because of our irrational obsession with prohibition. It is time to stop and produce policies that actually work."

== Bibliography ==
- Barns, Greg & John Cherry (March 2003). "Groundswell". Correspondence. Quarterly Essay. 9: 84–85.
- Barns, Greg (2003). What's wrong with the Liberal Party?.
- — (2005). Selling the Australian government: politics and propaganda from Whitlam to Howard.
- — (2019). Rise of the Right. Hardie Grant.

== Sources ==
- Greg Barns at onlineopinion.com.au
- Greg Barns at tasmanianbar.com.au
- "Libs push for more jail for rapists". ABC News. 14 July 2008. Archived from the original on 4 August 2008.
