= Youssef Boulos =

Lebanese actor (born 1994)

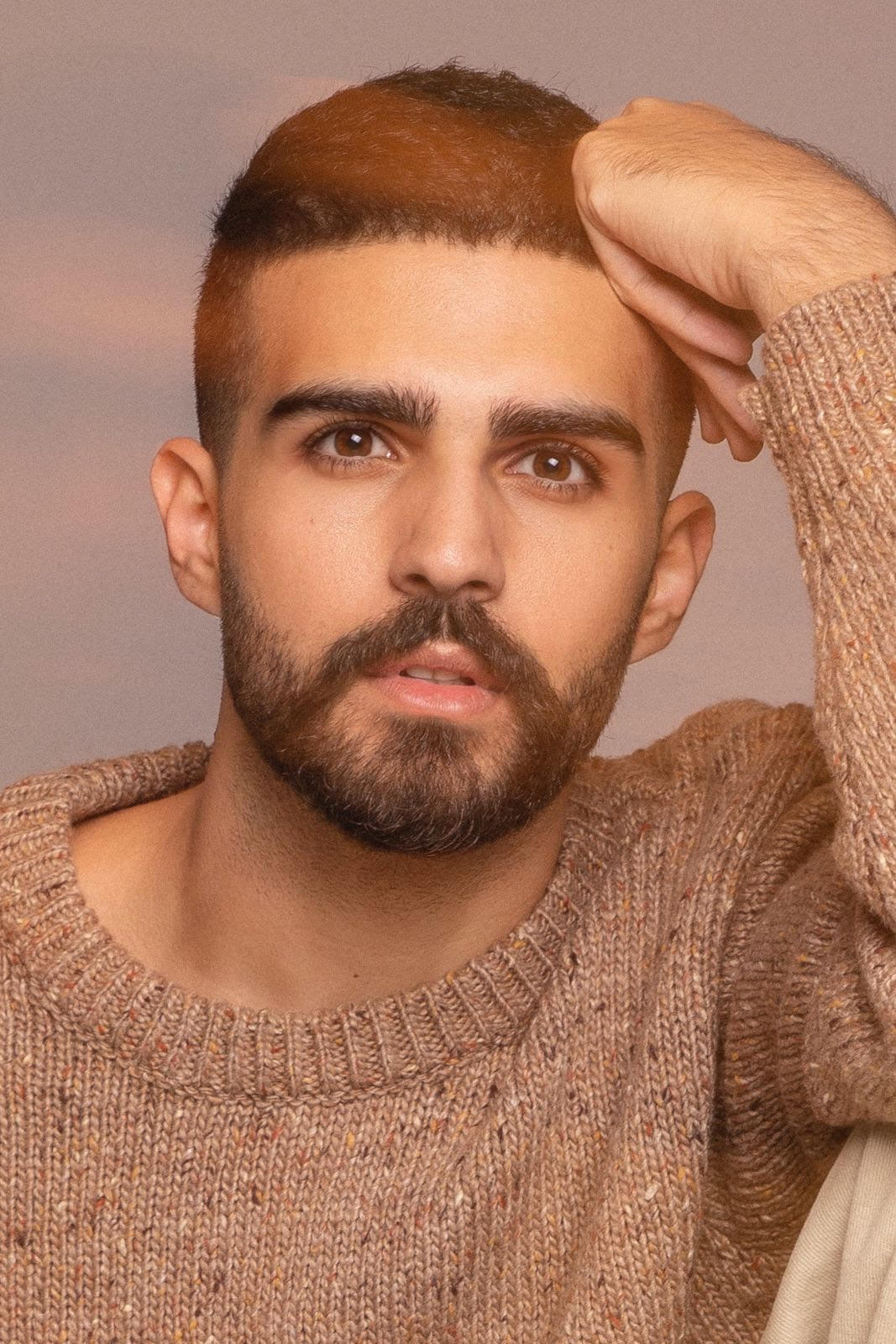
- Born: December 22, 1994 (age 30); Chekka, Lebanon
- Occupation: Actor
- Years active: 2017–present
- Works: Farah, Take my hand

Youssef Boulos (Arabic: يوسف بولس ; born 22 December 1994) is a Lebanese film actor and producer.

== Early life and education ==
Youssef was born in Chekka in North Lebanon on 22 December 1994 to Jean Boulos and Najat Semaan.

== Career ==
Boulos' first leading role was in Father Fady Tabet's play ʿAfwaki Ya Ummi (Sorry Mother). The company toured in various countries, including Jordan and Australia. In 2017, he played the lead role of aspiring actor Nadim in Serge Majdalani's Take my hand. Boulos appeared in the 2018 Lebanese series Habibi al-Ladoud (My sworn ennemy lover), and in the 2019 production Akher el-Layl (Night's end). In 2020, he appeared in the Syrian-Lebanese comedy series Mayyada wa Wlada (Mayyada and her children), along with Syrian star actress Shukran Murtaja.

In 2021, he played the role of a drug dealer in all seven episodes of the true crime Saudi thriller miniseries Rashash (Machine gun). The series, which is set in ultra-conservative 1990s Saudi Arabia, was described as a groundbreaking, and a benchmark for the local film industry.

In 2022, Boulos starred in the Emirati-Lebanese psychological thriller Farah (Joy), where he plays The Reporter, an unnamed personage who appears to be the product of the protagonist's confabulations. Farah garnered favorable reviews and won the Special 10th Anniversary Award for Best Feature Film at the 2022 New York’s Chelsea Film Festival, Best Feature Film award at the Lebanese Independent Film Festival. At the Alexandria Mediterranean Film Festival, the movie won the Best Arabic Film award and the Mahmoud Abdel Aziz Best Art Direction prize. The film also won the Best Feature Film Award at the Lebanese Film Festival Canada. Critics also praised the performances of actors Boulos and Atala.
