= Listed buildings in More, Shropshire =

More is a civil parish in Shropshire, England. It contains 20 listed buildings that are recorded in the National Heritage List for England. Of these, one is listed at Grade I, the highest of the three grades, two are at Grade II*, the middle grade, and the others are at Grade II, the lowest grade. The parish includes the villages of Linley and More, and the surrounding countryside. The most important building in the parish is Linley Hall, a country house. This, and associated structures, are listed. Most of the other listed buildings are houses, cottages, farmhouses and farm buildings, the oldest of which are timber framed. The other listed buildings include a church and a bridge.

== Key ==
Grade	Criteria
I	Buildings of exceptional interest, sometimes considered to be internationally important
II*	Particularly important buildings of more than special interest
II	Buildings of national importance and special interest

== Buildings ==
Name and location	Photograph	Date	Notes	Grade
St Peter's Church; 52.51762°N 2.96966°W		13th century	The oldest part of the church is the tower, the north transept was added as a burial chapel in 1640 and extended in 1871, and the body of the church was largely rebuilt in 1846–47. It is built in stone, the roof of the tower and chancel are slated, and the transept and nave are tiled. The church consists of a nave, a long north transept, a north vestry, a chancel, and a west tower. The tower is massive and contains a pointed doorway, a paired west lancet window, slit openings, and a double pyramidal roof.	II*
Old Rectory; 52.51725°N 2.97015°W		Late 16th to early 17th century	The house, which has been altered and extended, is timber framed with plaster infill and a slate roof. The right gable end is clad in stone, and the attic of the right gable end is jettied. There are two storeys and an attic, and three or four bays. In the centre is a reconstructed gabled porch, with a sash window to the left, a mullioned and transomed casement window to the right, and the windows elsewhere are casements.	II
Church Farmhouse; 52.51777°N 2.96920°W		Early 17th century	The farmhouse was extended and altered on a number of occasions. It is timber framed with plaster infill, partly roughcast, with some stone cladding, and a slate roof. There are two storeys and a cellar, originally a hall and cross-wing, later extended. The farmhouse has a flat-roofed porch, the windows are casements, and there is some jettying.	II
More Farmhouse; 52.52275°N 2.97400°W	—	Early 17th century	The farmhouse was extended and altered on a number of occasions. It is timber framed with brick infill on a stone plinth, partly roughcast, with a slate roof. It has two storeys and an attic, and a T-shaped plan consisting of a short hall range and a longer cross-wing. The front has five bays, and there is a lean-to extension. The south gable end is jettied at the attic, and on the front is a reconstructed porch with elaborate bargeboards and a finial. The windows are casements, and on the west front is a three-storey gabled projection.	II
Old Smithy; 52.52942°N 2.95846°W	—	Early to mid 17th century (probable)	The cottage and former smithy are in limestone with a thatched roof. The cottage has one storey and an attic, and two bays. There is a lean-to porch, the windows are casements, and there are two eaves dormers. The entrance to the former smithy on the left is through a lean-to, and it contains a double hatch and a slate-capped projection.	II
Pultheley; 52.54453°N 2.99729°W	—	Early to mid 17th century	A farmhouse that was remodelled and extended in the 19th century, the original parts are timber framed with plaster infill, partly roughcast, the extensions and refacing are in limestone, and the roofs are slated. There is one storey and an attic, and three bays. On the front is a gabled porch, the windows are casements, and there are three gabled eaves dormers.	II
Hillend; 52.55412°N 2.98437°W	—	17th century	A timber framed cottage with red brick and plaster infill on a stone plinth, with stone-clad gable ends, and a stone-slate roof repaired in Welsh slate. There is one storey and an attic, two bays, a single-storey extension to the left, and a rear outshut. The windows are casements, and there are two gabled dormers with bargeboards and finials.	II
Partridge Farmhouse and Farm Cottage; 52.52469°N 2.95652°W	—	17th century	The farmhouse has been extended and altered, and divided into two dwellings. It is basically timber framed, mainly clad in limestone, and has slate roofs. The main range has two storeys and three bays, and the rear wing, probably the earliest part, has one storey and an attic. In the centre is a porch, and the windows are casements.	II
Upper Bent; 52.53314°N 2.98004°W	—	17th century	The farmhouse, which has been considerably altered and extended, was originally timber framed, it has been extended in limestone, and has slate roof. There are two storeys, originally with three bays, and extended to the right and at the rear. It has a partly timber-framed porch, and the windows are casements.	II
Stables, Linley Hall; 52.53042°N 2.96440°W		c. 1740	The stable block incorporates earlier material. It is in stone with brick dressings and slate roofs. The block consists of four ranges around a courtyard, and has two storeys. In the centre of the east, south and west ranges are bell turrets, each with a cupola and a weathervane. The east range has nine bays and contains a central round-arched entrance. Some of the windows are casements and other are sashes. The doorways have pediments, and there are three-bay pediments in the centres of the east and south ranges. Incorporated in the south range is a 17th-century twin-gabled building.	II*
Linley Hall; 52.52995°N 2.96510°W		1743–78	A country house in limestone, with a modillion eaves cornice, pediments, and a hipped slate roof. There are two storeys, and an H-shaped plan with a double-pile centre and slightly projecting wings, a west front of three bays, the other fronts having five bays. The east entrance front has a rusticated ground floor, and contains a central doorway with a Gibbs surround, and above it is a Venetian window, over which is a diocletian window with a keystone. The other windows are sashes, some with pediments, the others with keystones. At the rear is an Ionic porch with a pulvinated frieze and a pediment.	I
Barn, cowshed and stables, Church Farm; 52.51780°N 2.96865°W		18th century (probable)	The farm buildings are in stone with slate roofs, and have an L-shaped plan. They contain lofts, eaves hatches, doorways, and ventilation shafts.	II
Gate piers, gates and railings, Linley Hall; 52.51704°N 2.95696°W		18th century (probable)	The square gate piers are in rusticated stone, and each has a moulded plinth, and a bracketed frieze to the capping. The wrought iron gates are ornamental, and above is an elaborate overthrow with anthemion decoration in the centre, and gold leaf detailing. These are flanked by low quadrant walls ending in rectangular piers with bracketed coping.	II
Bridge over River West Onny; 52.53862°N 2.96539°W	—	Late 18th century (probable)	The bridge carries a track over the River West Onny. It is in limestone, and consists of a single wide span. The bridge has brick voussoirs, and a ledged parapet.	II
The Malthouse; 52.51715°N 2.96932°W		Late 18th century (probable)	A farmhouse with an attached former malthouse, it is in limestone with a tile roof. There are two storeys and an attic, three bays, and the former malthouse attached at right angles to the front on the left. The windows are sashes, there is a timber porch, and above the door is a radial fanlight.	II
Toll House Farmhouse; 52.54655°N 2.99761°W		c. 1822	The former toll house is in limestone with brick quoins and dressings and has a Welsh slate roof. There are two storeys, two bays, and an L-shaped plan. The doorway has a Tudor arch and above the ground floor windows are hood moulds.	II
Avenue Lodge; 52.51706°N 2.95763°W		Early 19th century	The lodge to Linley Hall is in limestone with a hipped tile roof. There are two storeys, a roughly L-shaped plan, and a front of three bays, the left two bays gabled, and the right bay polygonal. The windows are small-paned casements, and there are two porches.	II
Linley Lodge; 52.52803°N 2.96258°W	—	Early 19th century	The lodge to Linley Hall is in limestone with a hipped slate roof. There are two storeys, and a rectangular plan with a projection to the north. It has two storeys, a two-bay south front, and a single-storey rear wing. The windows are small-paned casements, and at the north is a loggia under wide projecting eaves.	II
Lower Beach; 52.54464°N 2.96396°W	—	Mid 19th century (probable)	The cottage, which possibly incorporates earlier material, is in limestone with a thatched roof. There are two storeys, and a lean-to at the rear. On the front is a wide porch with a round-headed doorway, and the windows are casements.	II
Bromleysmill; 52.52000°N 2.98561°W	—	1845	The cottage, which was extended in the 20th century, is in limestone and has a tile roof. There are two storeys, and it has roughly a T-shaped plan, with a front of two bays, the right bay projecting slightly and gabled. In the angle is a gabled porch and a Tudor arched doorway, and the windows are casements with hood moulds. All the gables have scrollwork bargeboards and finials.	II
