= Farah (film) =

- Theatrical release poster
- Directed by: Hassiba Freiha; Kenton Oxley
- Written by: Hassiba Freiha
- Produced by: Reine Issa; Gabriel Shipton
- Starring: Stephanie Atala; Majdi Machmouchi; Nader Abd Alhay; Youssef Boulos
- Music by: Aidan Lavelle
- Production companies: Intuitive Features; Knockout Productions
- Distributed by: MAD Distribution
- Release date: 24 November 2022
- Running time: 119 minutes
- Countries: United Arab Emirates; Lebanon
- Languages: Arabic; English

Farah is a 2022 Emirates-produced Lebanese psychological thriller directed by Emirati-British couple Hassiba Freiha and Kenton Oxley. The film was written by Freiha, starring Lebanese actors Stephanie Atala, Majdi Machmouchi, Nader Abd Alhay, and Youssef Boulos. The theme song “Try to remember” was performed by English musician and mental health activist Boy George, and protagonist Stephanie Atala. The film follows Lina (Atala), a pre-med student in the US, who struggles with exacerbating anxiety, low mood, and recurrent nightmares. The story explores big pharma and mental health, as well as failing family dynamics in modern Lebanon. The title of the film means “joy” in Arabic (فَرَح faraḥ); it refers to the street name of Xapa, a prescription antidepressant used recreationally in the film. Farah premiered at the 2022 Beirut International Women Film Festival, and was commercially released on 24 November 2022 in Lebanese cinemas. It was also released on Netflix on 8 December 2022. It garnered favorable reviews and a number of regional and international honorable mentions and awards.

== Plot ==
Lina Nasser is a pre-med student in California, who struggles with worsening depression, anxiety and recurrent nightmares. She returns to Beirut when her symptoms exacerbate and her academic performance significantly deteriorates.

In Beirut, Lina is placed under the care of her father Nabil (Majdi Machmouchi) who works for a big pharma company, and is prescribed a new generation antidepressant called Xapa. Soon afterwards she starts experiencing additional severe symptoms including psychosis, paranoid delusions and confabulation. In an attempt to ground herself in reality, Lina revisits her memories of her deceased mother Farah (Hassiba Freiha), which suggest that her mental health issues stem from trauma linked to her mother.

Lina is visited by an unnamed reporter (Youssef Boulos) who is investigating the effects of Xapa, sold illegally, and abused recreationally under the street name "Joy". She begins to question the motives and distrusts everyone, including the reporter, her father, and her nanny Gita (Josyane Boulos). She also questions whether her symptoms are the result of her preexisting condition, or side effects of Xapa.

Lina eventually resorts to Dr Salam (Pierrette Katrib) who prescribes non-pharmacological and adjuvant therapies that alleviate her symptoms and restore her inner peace.

== Cast ==
- Stephanie Atala, as Lina Nasser
- Majdi Machmouchi, as Nabil Nasser
- Nader Abd Elhay, as Sami
- Youssef Boulos, as The Reporter
- Walid El-Alayli, as Phar-EMENA CEO
- Assaad Rechdan, as Dr. Maalouf
- Hassiba Freiha, as Farah Nasser
- Pierette Katrib, as Dr. Salam
- Josyane Boulos, as Gita
- Janah Fakhoury, as Janah

== Production ==
=== Screenplay and inspiration ===
Emirati writer and director Hassiba Freiha wrote the screenplay in 2018. The script explores the stigma of mental illness, and the limitations of pharmacological treatment. Kenton and Freiha were inspired by their own experience, and the experiences of their entourage with mental health. Freiha cites American developmental psychologist Bruce Lipton’s The Biology of Belief and Katinka Blackford’s The Pill That Steals Lives as resources that helped get a better understanding of behavioral and mental health sciences. In her story, Freiha explores the role of epigenetics, and inherited trauma, on the mental health of subsequent generations.

The script is in Arabic and English, and is set in modern Lebanon. Freiha chose the language mix and location based on her real life experience, being of Lebanese-American descent, and to depict the complex multicultural Lebanese society that is simultaneously very Westernized and traditionally-inclined. The story also portrays the experience of the Lebanese who are conflicted on whether to seek study and work opportunities abroad or to stay in their homeland. Freiha and Kenton sought to make Farah's characters relatable, and to avoid the bleakness that accompanies emotionally charged psychological thrillers that deal with mental health. According to the couple, it was important to make the movie palatable to the general population, and to start a conversation about a holistic approach to the treatment of mental illnesses that doesn’t only focus on treating symptoms.

=== Filming ===
Farah was directed by Emirati-British couple Hassiba Freiha and Kenton Oxley, it was shot in Lebanon between 2019 and 2020, at the height of the COVID-19 pandemic. The first day of filming coincided with the beginning of the 2019 Lebanese protests. These delayed filming and release. Freiha commented on the mental health effects of the pandemic:

I just think that people would not have had that much discussion on mental health awareness if it wasn't for Covid. It’s made everyone more open to the subject, because show me anyone who wouldn’t have some kind of mental impact from all of that? I don't think this film could be any more needed, or more relevant, at this point.

=== Music ===
The musical score was composed by London-based producer and composer Aidan Lavelle. The film’s theme score, Try to Remember, is performed by British pop star and mental health advocate Boy George and Stephanie Atala.

== Accolades ==
Farah garnered favorable reviews and won the Special 10th Anniversary Award for Best Feature Film at the 2022 New York’s Chelsea Film Festival, Best Feature Film award at the Lebanese Independent Film Festival. At the Alexandria Mediterranean Film Festival, the movie won the Best Arabic Film award and the Mahmoud Abdel Aziz Best Art Direction prize, awarded to Musa Baydoun and Nizar Nassar. The film also won the Best Feature Film Award at the Lebanese Film Festival Canada. Critics also praised the performances of emerging actors Atala and Boulos.
