= Edward la Zouche, 11th Baron Zouche =

English diplomat (1556–1625)

The Right Honourable The Lord Zouche
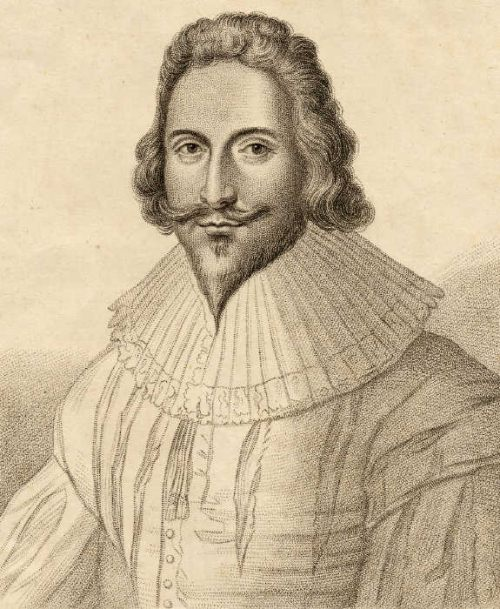

Lord Warden of the Cinque Ports
- In office 1615–1625
- Preceded by: The Earl of Somerset
- Succeeded by: The Duke of Buckingham

Personal details
- Born: 6 June 1556
- Died: 18 August 1625 (aged 69)
- Spouse: Eleanor Zouche; Sarah Harrington
- Parent: George la Zouche, 10th Baron Zouche

Edward la Zouche, 11th Baron Zouche (6 June 1556 – 18 August 1625) was an English diplomat. He is remembered chiefly for his lone vote against the condemnation of Mary, Queen of Scots, and for organising the stag hunt where his guest, the Archbishop of Canterbury, accidentally killed a man.

== Early life ==
Zouche was the son of George la Zouche, 10th Baron Zouche, of the noble Breton-origin Zouche dynasty, and his wife Margaret, née Welby. He was a royal ward from 1570, under the care of William Cecil. In a letter to Cecil written in 1596, Zouche confessed that he spent his patrimony as a youth, having indulged in "little searching for knowledge".

== Marriage ==
In or around 1578, Zouche married his cousin Eleanor Zouche, daughter of Sir John Zouche and Eleanor, née Whalley. They had two daughters, Elizabeth and Mary, but, shortly after Mary's birth in 1582, Zouche left Eleanor and they lived apart until her death in 1611. Eleanor wrote to Lord Burghley, from her lodging in the Strand on 19 May 1593, following her father's death, still hoping to be reconciled with Zouche. Sir John Holles wrote to Sir Edward Phillips describing her treatment;

My Lord Souche [sic] put away this his lady twenty-nine years ago and refusing her all allowance was by law sentenced there-unto, which he not performing was excommunicate; from which he went beyond sea and returning was ordered to pay her 50s the week, from which poor allowance with a small addition from her friends hath this Baron's wife...ever since lived. She was oft dangerously sick that physic was chargeable. He never disbursed a penny, and now dead she might have rotted in her chamber ere he would have buried her.

Within a year of Eleanor's death, Zouche married again, to Sarah Harington (1565–1629), daughter of Sir James Harington. There were no children of this marriage. Sarah Harington had been twice widowed, having been previously married to Francis Hastings, Lord Hastings, who would have been Earl of Huntingdon but predeceased his father, and Sir George Kingsmill. With the death of Zouche, Sarah married Sir Thomas Edmondes. Her portrait was painted by Isaac Oliver and by Cornelius Johnson. The portraits by Johnson show her aged 63 wearing a large miniature case referring to Frederick V of the Palatinate with the Greek letter "phi". A similar miniature case was described in an inventory of a Scottish soldier.

== Career ==
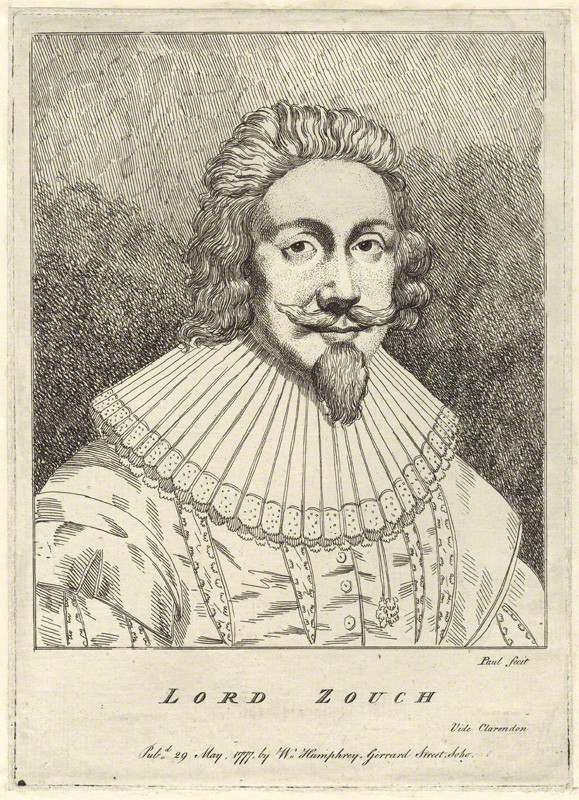
Portrait etching of Lord Zouche published 29 May 1777

Zouche matriculated from Trinity College, Cambridge in Easter 1570, M.A. 1571; and was admitted to Gray's Inn, 1575, though he was not admitted to the bar.

Zouche was appointed a Commissioner for the trial of Mary, Queen of Scots, at Fotheringhay. He was the only Commissioner to offer any dissent against her judgement and subsequent sentence of death.

In later years he served as Ambassador to Scotland, Lord President of the Council of Wales and Lord Warden of the Cinque Ports. He reported the state of the fortifications of the Cinque Ports to King James. He was a Privy Counsellor from 1603.

Zouche was ambassador in Scotland from 5 January to 6 April 1594, at the time of the birth of Prince Henry. Sir Robert Cecil complained that he had not received updates from Zouche, and he was very displeased to hear that Zouche and the diplomat Robert Bowes had lent money to Francis Stewart, 5th Earl of Bothwell on the security of a jewel and some silver plate. They had sent the jewel to London. Cecil wanted Zouche to make the loan seem a private transaction, a purchase of a jewel, and not to be known as an action of Queen Elizabeth to fund and support Bothwell, who was suspect in Scotland.

Zouche showed an interest in the New World, and was a Commissioner of the Virginia Company from 1608. He was also interested in horticulture; his house in Hackney included a physic garden and he employed Matthias L'Obel as his gardener.

The house in Hackney lay on the north side of Homerton High Street, probably on the site of the present Dean Close. The herbalist, John Gerard, visited Hackney and was given foreign seeds from Zouche's garden. Zouche ceased to be a Hackney resident before his death in 1625 and it is likely his house was sold in 1620, to Sir Julius Caesar, Master of the Rolls.

In 1605, Zouche purchased the manor of Bramshill in Hampshire and almost immediately began to build the mansion that currently stands on the site. James I stayed at Bramshill in 1620 and the next year George Abbot, Archbishop of Canterbury, went down to Bramshill to consecrate a chapel for Lord Zouche. The visit had disastrous consequences for the Archbishop when he accepted Zouche's invitation to a stag-hunt, where Abbot unintentionally killed a gamekeeper who strayed into his line of fire. Although all the witnesses, including Zouche, agreed that the gamekeeper's death was a tragic accident, Abbot's reputation never recovered from the incident. He remains the only Archbishop of Canterbury ever to be publicly known to have killed a man.

Bramshill was used as the UK Police Staff College from 1960 to 2015.

== Connection with More children on the Mayflower ==
In 1620, Lord Zouche provided counsel and other help in an incident involving him and his longtime secretary Samuel More, who was in his employ at the time of Zouche's death in 1625. More was the eldest son of a respected parliamentarian from Shropshire, Richard More. He had married in 1610/11 to a cousin Katherine More, and by 1616 was charging that she had committed adultery with a longtime lover, conceiving four children by him: Elinor, Jasper, Richard and Mary. Four rancorous years and twelve court appearances followed, culminating in 1620 with the four children being sent without their mother's knowledge to the Plymouth Colony on the ship Mayflower as indentured servants, upon the counsel of Lord Zouche, who was a New England Council commissioner, acting on the request of Samuel More and his father Richard, who were searching for a location far away to which the children could be sent.

== Death ==
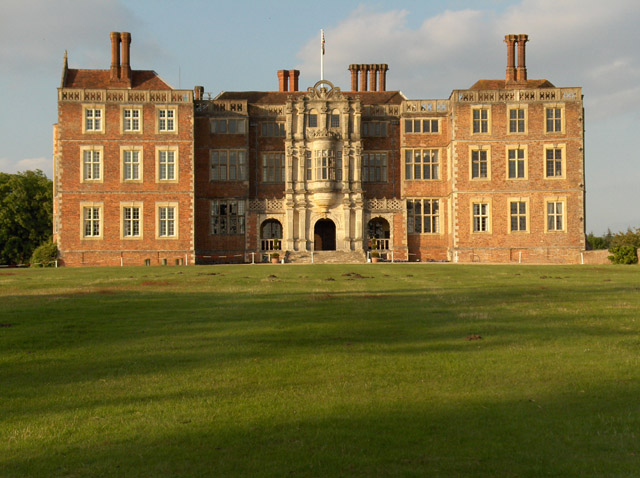
Lord Zouche's manor, Bramshill House

Zouche died in 1625, after suffering illness for some time. His resting place is unknown. He was not buried in the parish church at Hackney, despite the verses penned by Ben Jonson.

Wherever I die, oh, here may I lie
Along by my good Lord Zouche,
That when I am dry, to the tap I may hie,
And so back again to my couch.

On Zouche's death, the Barony of Zouche fell into abeyance between his daughter Mary (who married in 1610 Thomas Leighton, son of Sir Thomas Leighton the Governor of Guernsey) and the heirs of his daughter Elizabeth (died 1617, wife of Sir William Tate). The abeyance was terminated in 1815 in favour of Cecil Bisshopp, 12th Baron Zouche, whose grandmother Catherine Tate was Elizabeth's heir-at-law.

== Offices ==
- Ambassador to Scotland, January–April 1594
- Ambassador to Denmark, June–July 1598
- Deputy Governor of Guernsey, 1600–01
- Lord President of the Council of Wales, 14 June 1602 – 1607
- Privy Counsellor, 11 May 1603
- Commissioner of Claims for the Coronation of James I, 7 July 1603
- Commissioner for compounding for knighthoods, 17 July 1603
- Commissioner to banish Jesuits, 5 September 1604
- Commissioner to inquire into injuries done by pirates, 16 July 1609
- Councillor for the Virginia Company, beginning on 23 May 1609
- Councillor for New England, 3 Nov 1602
- Commissioner to treat with France, 4 July 1610
- Commissioner for the Treasury, 16 June 1612 – 1614
- Lord Warden of the Cinque Ports and Constable of Dover Castle for life, 13 July 1615,
- Commissioner for the rendition of Flushing and Brill, 21 May 1616
- Privy Councillor (Scotland), 29 June 1617
- Commissioner to inquire into abuses in the Treasury, 10 July 1618
- Commissioner of Ecclesiastical Causes, 29 April 1620 and 21 January 1624/5
- Commissioner for defective titles of lands, 4 July 1622 and 26 July 1623.

Political offices
Preceded by The Earl of Pembroke	Lord President of Wales; Lord Lieutenant of Wales (less Glamorgan and Monmouthshire), Herefordshire, Shropshire and Worcestershire; 1602–1607	Succeeded by The Lord Eure
Honorary titles
Preceded by The Earl of Somerset	Lord Warden of the Cinque Ports; 1615–1625	Succeeded by The Duke of Buckingham
Peerage of England
Preceded by George la Zouche	Baron Zouche; 1569–1625	Succeeded by Cecil Bisshopp
