= Gabriel Shipton =

Filmmaker and brother of Julian Assange

Gabriel Shipton is an Australian filmmaker and the son of John Shipton and the half-brother of Julian Assange. He and his father often advocated for Assange's release.

== Career ==
Gabriel Shipton is known best for producing the 2021 Australian documentary movie Ithaka, which depicted the incarceration of WikiLeaks founder Julian Assange through the experience of his wife Stella Assange and his father John Shipton.

Shipton also produced Emu Runner which premiered at the Toronto International Film Festival (TIFF) in 2018 and was nominated for an Australian AACTA award in 2019. He worked as a Production Accountant on movies and TV series, including Mad Max: Fury Road, Peter Rabbit, Lion, Glitch, and Jack Irish. His other movies credits include I Frankenstein, Predestination, and Farah.

== Activism ==
Gabriel Shipton is the Chairperson of the Assange Campaign.

In 2022, Gabriel Shipton accepted the Freedom of the City for Mexico City for his brother. In 2023, he lobbied the Albanese government to work for his brother's freedom. In 2024, Gabriel Shipton attended the United States State of the Union speech as a guest of Congressman Thomas Massie.

Shipton is the founder and chair of the Information Rights Project, an Australian charity fighting for the right to information.
