= More, Shropshire =

Village in Shropshire, England

Coordinates: 52.517°N 2.969°W

More
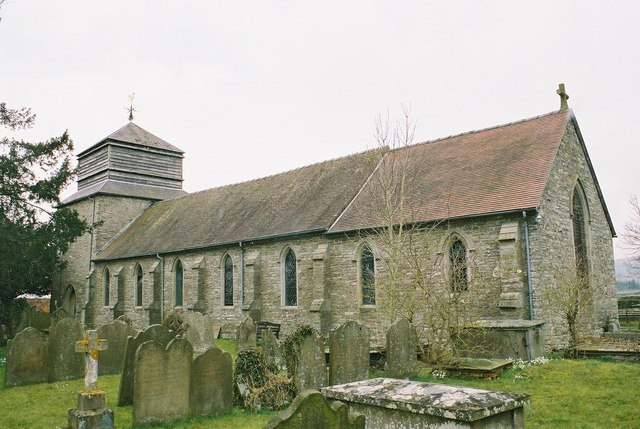
- St. Peter's Church, More

- Location within Shropshire
- Population: 121 (2011)
- OS grid reference: SO342914
- Civil parish: More
- Unitary authority: Shropshire
- Ceremonial county: Shropshire
- Region: West Midlands
- Country: England
- Sovereign state: United Kingdom
- Post town: Bishops Castle
- Postcode district: SY9
- Dialling code: 01588
- Police: West Mercia
- Fire: Shropshire
- Ambulance: West Midlands
- UK Parliament: Ludlow

More is a small village and civil parish in Shropshire, England.

It lies near the border with Wales and the nearest town is Bishop's Castle.

There is a parish church in the village. The civil parish extends greatly to the north of the village, encompassing a large tract of rural upland, and includes the community of Linley.

Nearby is the larger settlement of Lydham, which is outside the civil parish and on the A488 road.

== See also ==
- Listed buildings in More, Shropshire
