= Shipston (surname) =

Shipston is a surname. Notable people with the surname include:

- Frank Shipston (1906–2005), English cricketer
- Rio Shipston (born 2004), English footballer
- Tui Shipston (born 1951), New Zealand former swimmer
