= Shipton Hall =

Country house in Shropshire, England

Coordinates: 52.52359°N 2.647371°W

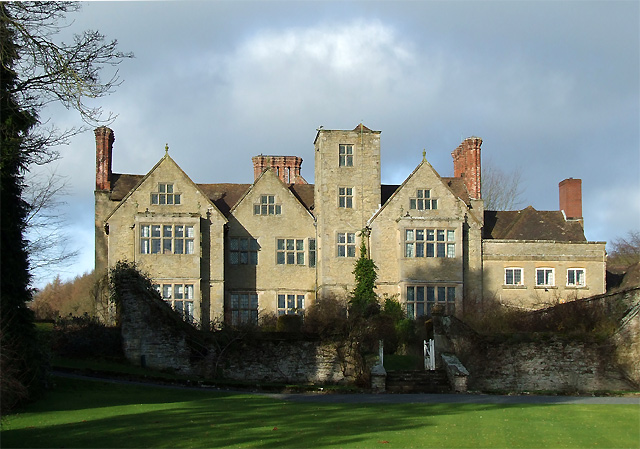
Shipton Hall

Shipton Hall is a large Elizabethan country house in the village of Shipton, Shropshire, England, which lies in the Corvedale valley some 7 miles south-west of Much Wenlock. It is a Grade I listed building.

The hall is constructed of limestone to an E-plan in two storeys with attics, and boasts a slender 4-storey tower in one of the internal corners. In the ornamental gardens are stables and an early monastic dovecote, which is a Grade II* listed building.

Close by stands the 12th century Church of St James.

== History ==
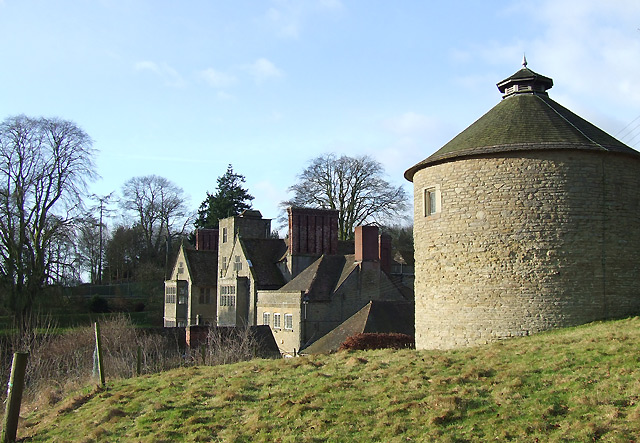
Dovecote

After the Dissolution of the Monasteries Shipton manor had been granted by the Crown in 1548 to Sir Thomas Palmer, after whose attainder and execution for high treason in 1553 it was resold by the Crown in 1557. After passing through several hands it eventually (1580) came into the possession of John Lutwyche.

The present house was originally built around 1587 for Richard Lutwyche to replace an older timber-framed house which had burned down. The decayed church of St James was also rebuilt by the Lutwyches in 1589 and is now a Grade II* listed building.

Richard Lutwyche later gave the estate to Thomas Mytton as a dowry when Mytton married Lutwyche's daughter and it thereafter descended in the Mytton family until 1795, when it passed by marriage to the local More family. In the late 1800s the Mores sold the Hall to the great-grandfather of the present owner. John Nicholas Bishop of Shipton Hall was High Sheriff of Shropshire in 2002.

The Hall was greatly rebuilt in the Georgian style in the mid-18th century, when the rococo interior decor was created by architect Thomas Farnolls Pritchard, designer of the Coalbrookdale Iron Bridge.

== See also ==
- Grade I listed buildings in Shropshire
- Listed buildings in Shipton, Shropshire
