= Stella Assange =

Swedish-Spanish lawyer (born 1983)

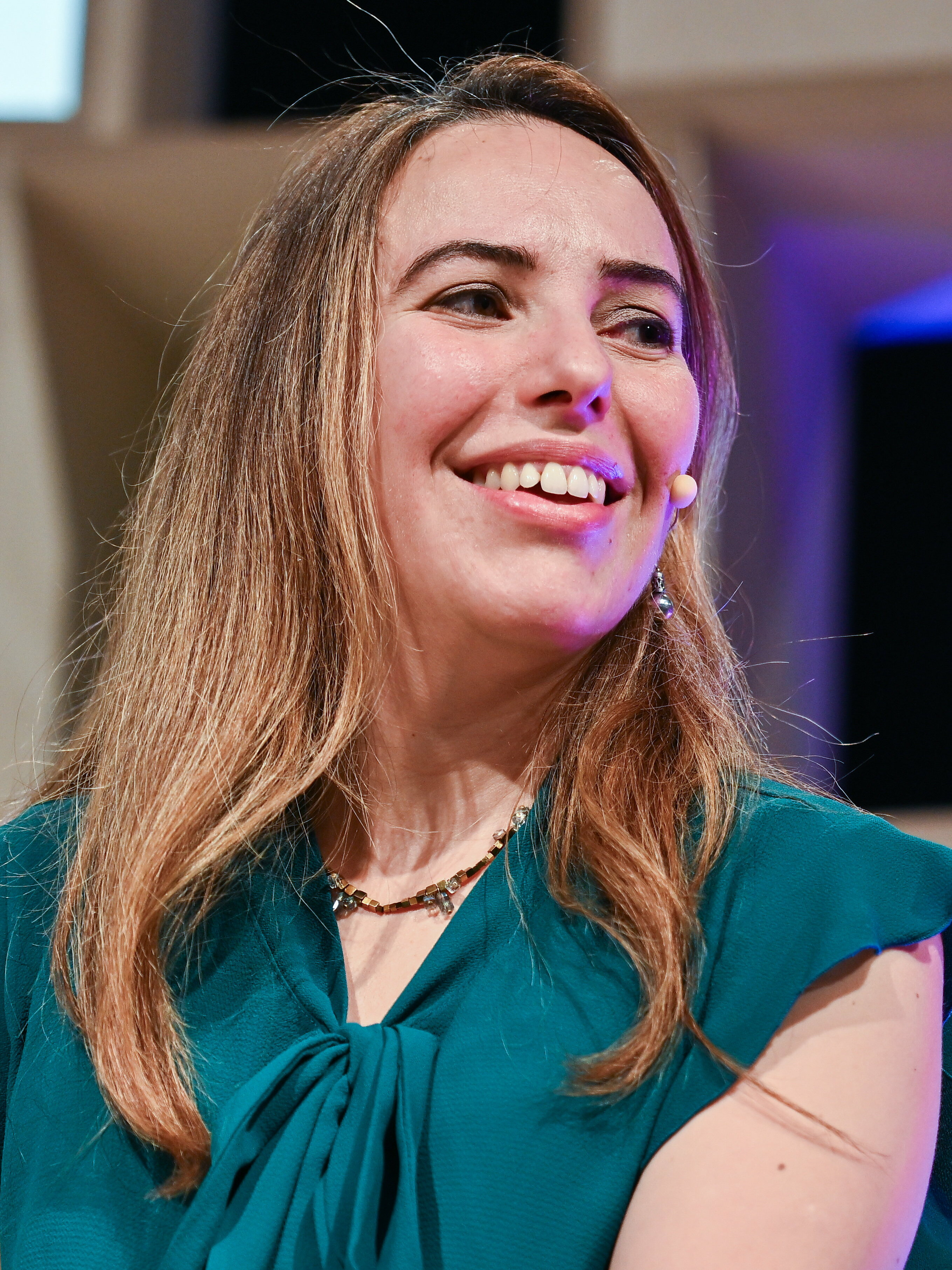
- Assange in 2023
- Born: Sara González Devant; 20 November 1983 (age 42); Johannesburg, Transvaal, South Africa
- Other names: Stella Moris, Stella Moris-Smith Robertson
- Citizenship: Spain; Sweden
- Education: SOAS University of London (BA); University of Oxford (MSc); Complutense University of Madrid (LLM)
- Occupation: Lawyer
- Spouse: Julian Assange (m. 2022)
- Children: 2

Stella Assange (née Sara González Devant; born 20 November 1983) is a Swedish-Spanish lawyer. Throughout her career, she has been an international advocate for human rights, most prominently in the case of her husband, Julian Assange. She changed her name to Stella Moris in 2012 and later to Stella Moris-Smith Robertson.

== Early life and education ==
Stella Assange was born Sara González Devant in 1983 in Johannesburg, South Africa. Her Spanish mother is a theatre director and her Swedish father–who is of Cuban heritage–is an architect, town planner, and artist. Both of her parents were known for participating in the Medu Art Ensemble, an anti-apartheid artist collective in Botswana. Throughout her youth, Assange lived in Botswana, Lesotho, Spain and Sweden. In 1985, during a raid into Gaborone conducted by the South African Defence Force, a family friend named Thami Mnyele was killed. This act of state-sponsored killing left a defining impression on the Devant family.

After attending an international school in Lesotho, Assange earned a degree in law and politics at SOAS University of London; a Master's of Science in refugee law at Oxford; and a Master's in public international law at the Complutense University of Madrid.

== Career ==
=== Work for Julian Assange ===
In 2011, Stella was hired by Julian Assange's legal team to help prevent his extradition to Sweden on sexual assault allegations. As a result of the team's success in delaying and ultimately preventing his extradition, the legal procedures were eventually dropped. For the sake of additional security while working with Julian, Stella changed her name to Stella Moris in 2012.

Stella was on Julian's legal team throughout his captivity, including during his asylum period in the Ecuadorian Embassy in London (2012–2019) and his incarceration in Belmarsh Prison (2019–2024). In reflecting on these legal battles, Stella noted that her multilingualism in Swedish and Spanish was indispensable when liaising with the Swedish and Ecuadorian authorities.

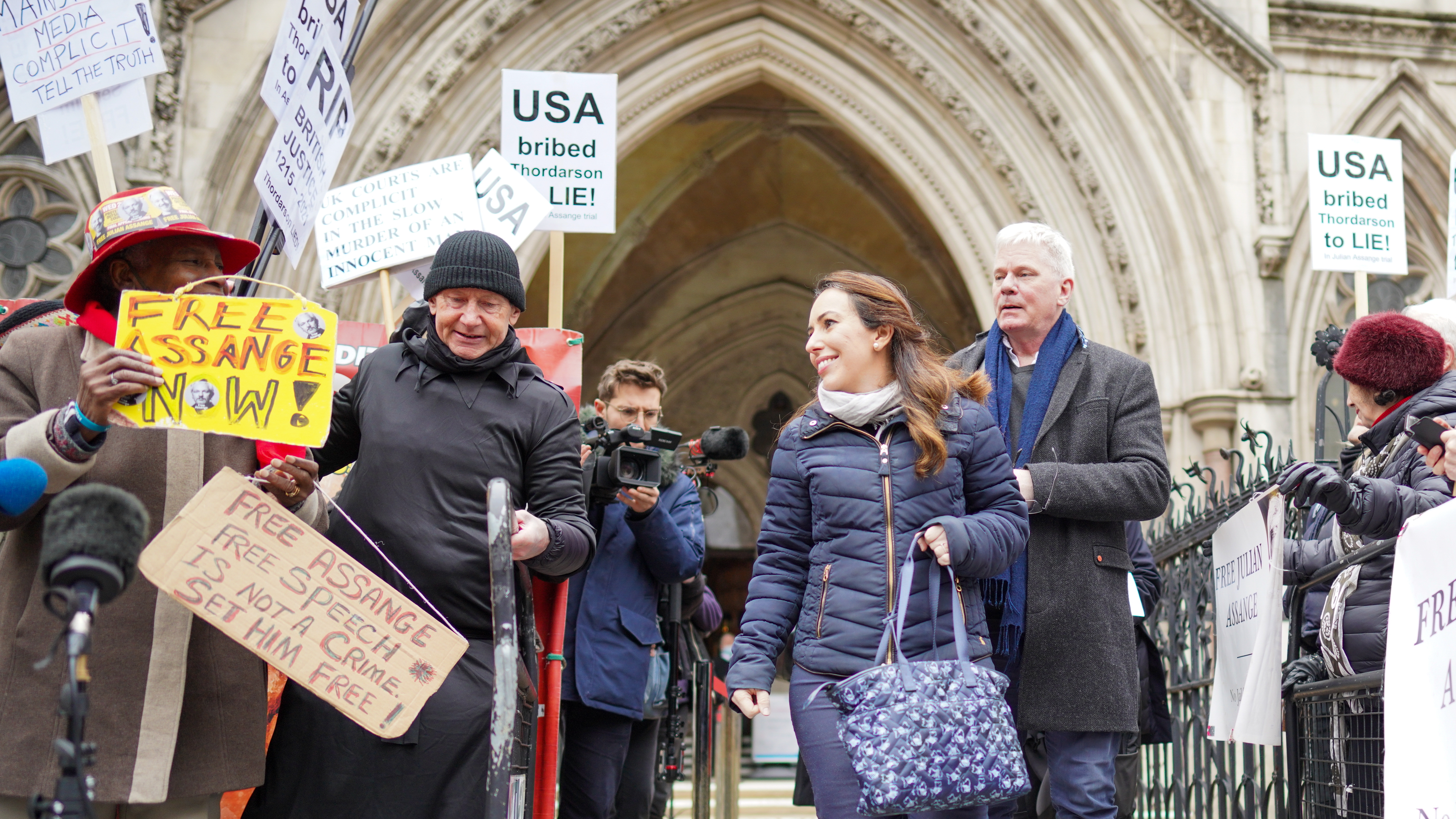
Stella Assange and supporters leaving the High Court in January 2022

On 10 October 2022, Stella and thousands of others locked arms in a human chain around the Parliament of the United Kingdom to demand Julian Assange's freedom and the cessation of any extradition attempts.

In 2023, Stella discussed her husband's situation with Pope Francis. On 24 June 2024, she released a statement saying that Julian Assange would be set free.

In addition to her work on her husband's behalf, Stella Assange has authored a number of articles for the magazine New Internationalist.

== Personal life and marriage ==
In 2015, Stella began a relationship with Julian Assange. During Julian's seven-year period of political asylum in the Ecuadorian Embassy in London, the couple conceived two children, who were born in 2017 and 2019. The children's godmothers are the rapper M.I.A. and Tracy Somerset, Duchess of Beaufort. On 23 March 2022, Stella and Julian were married in a ceremony in Belmarsh Prison.
