= Shipton, Shropshire =

Village in Shropshire, England

Coordinates: 52.523°N 2.646°W

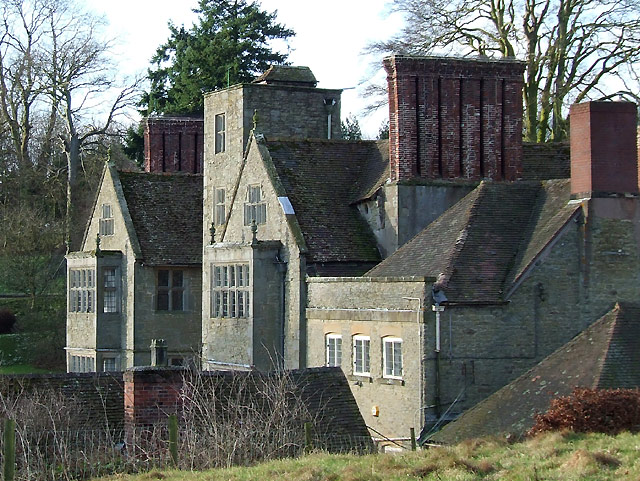
Shipton Hall

Shipton is a small village in Shropshire, England.

The 12th-century parish church of St James is a Grade II* Listed Building. It was rebuilt in 1589 by the Lutwyche family then owning the Hall.

The church figures prominently in the history of the Samuel More family of Mayflower pilgrims fame. The More family had their seat at Shipton Hall after acquiring the Hall through marriage from the Mytton family in 1795. The Hall is constructed of limestone to an E-plan. In the ornamental gardens are stables and an early monastic dovecote, which is a Grade II* listed building.

== See also ==
- Listed buildings in Shipton, Shropshire
