= Leslie Cannold =

Author, commentator, ethicist, and activist

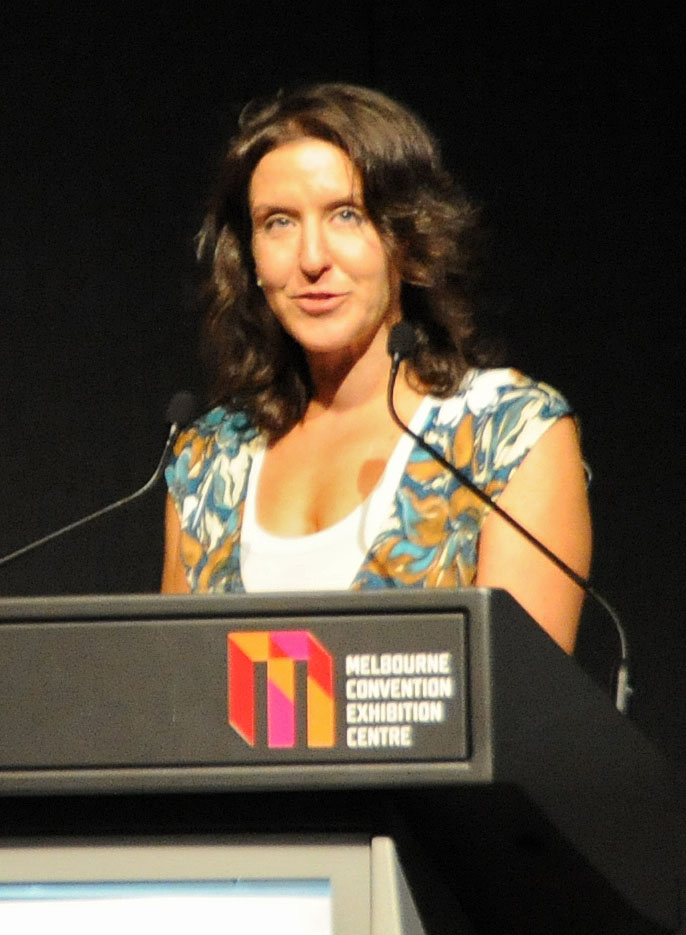
- Leslie Cannold in 2010
- Born: Port Chester, NY
- Occupations: Philosopher, ethicist, educationalist, writer, activist, and public intellectual

Leslie Cannold (born in Port Chester, NY) is an Australian philosopher, ethicist, educationalist, writer, activist, and public intellectual.

Leslie Cannold at TEDxCanberra 2012 about abortion

== Education and career ==
Born and raised in Armonk and Scarsdale, New York, Leslie Cannold migrated to Melbourne in her early twenties. She began writing for The Age as an opinion and education section columnist while raising young children and completing her graduate degrees.

Cannold has an BA from Wesleyan University, where she majored in psychology and theatre. She has a Master of Arts and a Masters in Bioethics from Monash University. She earned her PhD in Education at the University of Melbourne before commencing employment at the Centre for Applied Philosophy and Public Ethics (CAPPE) when C. A. J. Coady was director. As of 2011 Since leaving CAPPE, her government appointments have included extended membership on boards and panels regulating Australian health professionals (nurses, physiotherapists, psychologists), and ensuring proposed compulsory treatment for mentally ill patients conforms with the law. Since 2022, she has been the Associate Professor of Ethics and Impact https://cranlana.org.au/about/our-people/#meet-team at the Cranlana Centre for Ethical Leadership at Monash University.

Cannold is noted as one of Australia's leading public thinkers and women. In 2005, she was named alongside Peter Singer, Gustav Nossal, and Inga Clendinnen as one of Australia's top 20 public intellectuals. In 2013, she was named in the Power Index's Top Ten List of most influential brains.

== Books and columns ==
Cannold's devil's advocate column "Both Sides Now" began appearing weekly in Crikey at the start of 2021. Her fortnightly Moral Dilemma column appeared in Sydney's Sunday Sun-Herald from 2007 to 2013. Prior to that, she was an occasional columnist for The Age. Her opinions have also appeared in the Sydney Morning Herald, Crikey!, The Herald Sun, ABC The Drum Unleashed, The Courier Mail, and the national broadsheet The Australian. In 2011, she was recognised with an EVA for a Sunday Age opinion piece on sexual assault. From 2024, Leslie work can be found at Unreceived Wisdom on Substack.

Her books include the award-winning The Abortion Myth: Feminism morality and the hard choices women make and What, No Baby?: Why women are losing the freedom to mother and how they can get it back, which made the Australian Financial Review's top 101 books list. Her first work of fiction, The Book of Rachael, a historical novel, was published in 2011 and reprinted in 2012. She publishes on diverse subject areas, including grief, circumcision, HIV/AIDS, genetic manipulation, ex utero gestation, and regulating Assisted Reproductive Technologies (ARTs). She published chapters in Sperm Wars (2005) and The Australian Book of Atheism (2010), and Destroying the joint (2013).

== Radio and television work ==
Cannold's radio and TV appearances include ABC Radio National, triple j, Today Tonight, The 7:30 Report, A Current Affair, The Catch-Up, The Einstein Factor, SBS Insight, 9am with David & Kim, The Circle, Today, ABC News Breakfast, News 24, and Lateline.

For many years, she talked life, work, and ethics with well-known radio and TV broadcaster Virginia Trioli on 774 ABC Melbourne, and was heard regularly on 4BC and Deborah Cameron's morning show on ABC Radio Sydney. As of 2013, she talks ethics with Angela Owen on ABC Central West, and is a regular panellist on ABC TV's political talk show Q&A and on ABC TV's Compass.

== Activism ==
Cannold is past president of Reproductive Choice Australia, a national coalition of pro-choice organisations that played a key role in removing the ban on the abortion drug RU486 in 2006, and of Pro Choice Victoria, which was instrumental in the decriminalisation of abortion in Victoria in 2008. In 2011, she co-founded the not-for-profit speaker referral site No Chicks No Excuses. Leslie Cannold was awarded 2011 Australian Humanist of the Year in recognition of her valuable contribution to public debate on a wide range of ethical issues, of particular relevance to women and family life. Her TEDx talk on abortion has had close to 84,000 views, and in 2016, she spoke to around 6,000 activists from 169 countries at the International Women Deliver conference in Copenhagen about abortion stigma.

== Personal life ==
Cannold identifies herself as a secular Jew. She has two sons.
