= Linley, More =

Coordinates: 52.529°N 2.959°W

Linley
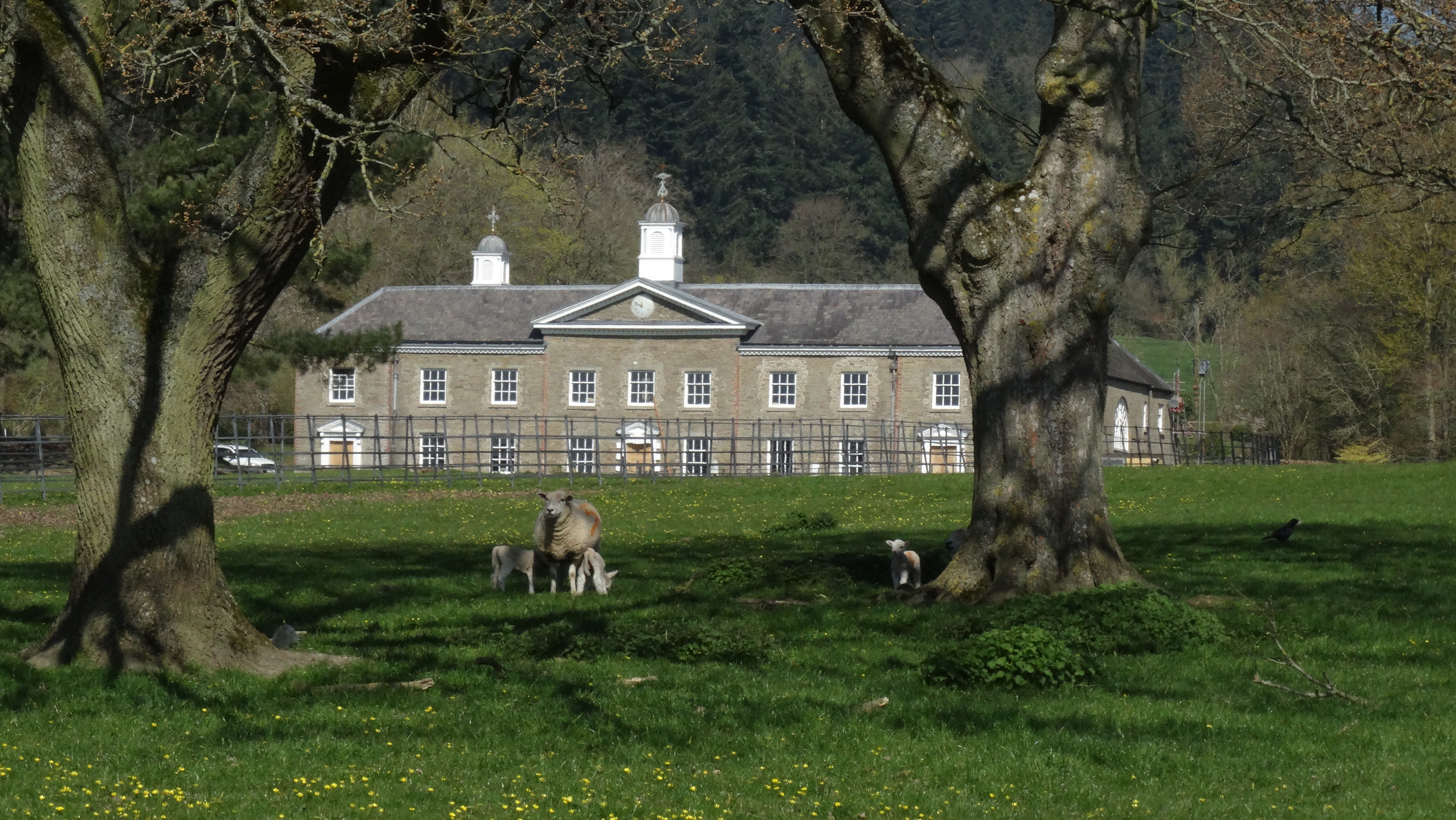
- Stables at Linley Hall

- Location within Shropshire
- OS grid reference: SO349928
- Civil parish: More
- Unitary authority: Shropshire
- Ceremonial county: Shropshire
- Region: West Midlands
- Country: England
- Sovereign state: United Kingdom
- Post town: BISHOPS CASTLE
- Postcode district: SY9
- Dialling code: 01588
- Police: West Mercia
- Fire: Shropshire
- Ambulance: West Midlands
- UK Parliament: Ludlow

Linley is a hamlet in the civil parish of More, in Shropshire, England.

The hamlet is located approximately 2 miles (3.2 km) east of the A488 road, and 2 miles north of the village of Lydham, and 3.5 miles north of Bishop's Castle. It is situated near the West Onny river and a local feature is Linley Hall.

== Geology ==
It approximates to the southern extremity of the Pontesford-Linley geological fault, which trends approximately 11 miles (18 km) to Pontesford. On 2 April 1990, the Pontesford-Linley Fault registered an earthquake with a magnitude of 5.1 on the Richter scale, known as the Bishop's Castle earthquake.

== See also ==
- Listed buildings in More, Shropshire
