= St Mary's Church, Acton Burnell =

Coordinates: 52.6131°N 2.6903°W

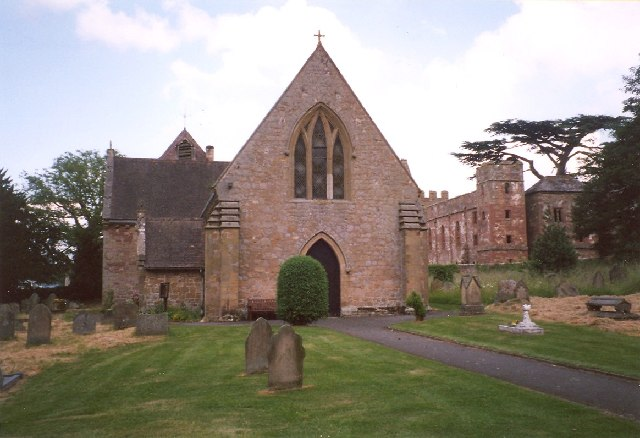
- St Mary's Church, Acton Burnell, from the west

- Location in Shropshire
- OS grid reference: SJ 534 019
- Location: Acton Burnell, Shropshire
- Country: England
- Denomination: Anglican
- Website: St Mary, Acton Burnell

History
- Status: Parish church
- Founder: Robert Burnell

Architecture
- Functional status: Active
- Heritage designation: Grade I
- Designated: 13 June 1958
- Architect: Fairfax B. Wade (restoration)
- Architectural type: Church
- Style: Gothic, Gothic Revival

Specifications
- Materials: Sandstone, tiled roofs

Administration
- Province: Canterbury
- Diocese: Hereford
- Archdeaconry: Ludlow
- Deanery: Condover
- Parish: Acton Burnell

Clergy
- Rector: Revd Geoffrey David Garrett

St Mary's Church is in the village of Acton Burnell, Shropshire, England, and stands near the ruins of Acton Burnell Castle. It is an active Anglican parish church in the deanery of Condover, the archdeaconry of Ludlow, and the diocese of Hereford. Its benefice is united with those of St Andrew and St Mary, Condover, St Mark, Frodesley, and St Michael and All Angels, Pitchford. The church is recorded in the National Heritage List for England as a designated Grade I listed building.

== History ==
The church was built between about 1275 and 1280 for Robert Burnell, who became Lord Chancellor of England, and then Bishop of Bath and Wells. It was restored in 1887–89 by Fairfax B. Wade, during which a small tower was added.

== Architecture ==
=== Exterior ===
St Mary's is constructed in sandstone with tiled roofs. It has a cruciform plan, consisting of a ten-bay nave with a north porch, a five-bay chancel, north and south chapels (acting as transepts), and a tower in the angle between the chancel and the north transept. The tower is in three stages with clasping buttresses. It has a pyramidal roof with a weathervane, and a gabled dormer window on the west side. There are two trefoil-headed louvred bell openings in the top stage, quatrefoil openings in the middle stage, and a lancet window and a doorway in the bottom stage. At the west end of the church are buttresses, and a doorway with a steep arch, above which are three stepped lancet windows. Along the eaves of the nave and transepts is a corbel table, some of the corbels being carved with heads. Above the outer doorway of the north porch is a niche. To the east of the porch, at a high level, is a circular window. On the south side of the church is a blocked doorway. The windows in the gable-ends of the transepts are stepped lancets. The chancel is at a lower level, and is more richly decorated. On its north and south sides are lancet windows in different groupings. There is a priest's door on the south side and a hagioscope on the north. The four-light east window is elaborate, with Purbeck marble shafts.

=== Interior ===
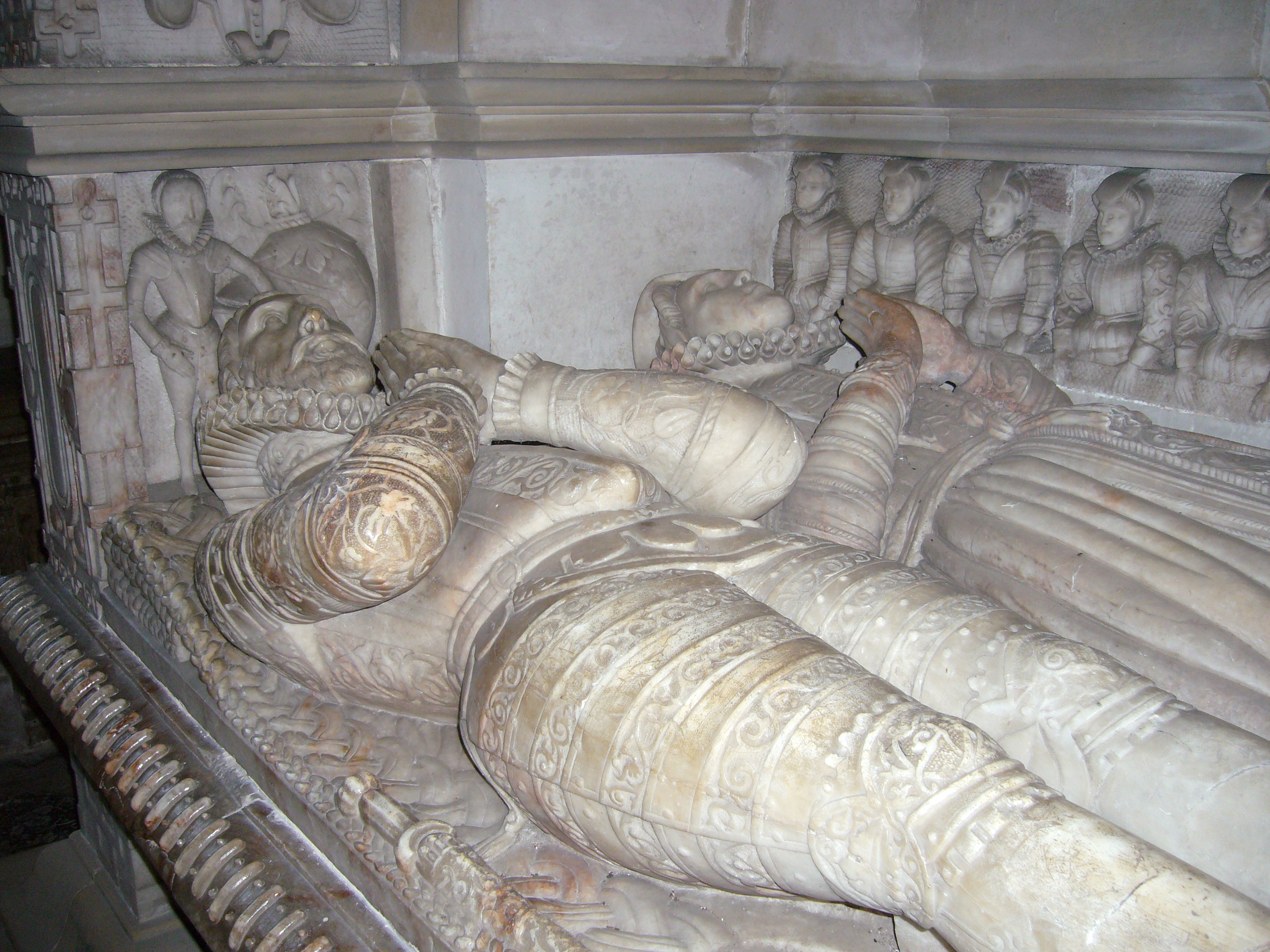
Elizabethan tomb of Sir Richard Lee (died 1591) and his wife in St Mary's Church, ancestors of Robert E. Lee.

The chancel roof is dated 1571, and the nave roof 1598. All the chancel windows internally are shafted in Purbeck marble. In the chancel is a large double piscina, and a trefoil-headed aumbry. There is also a large piscina in each of the transepts. The font is octagonal and dates from the 13h century. The pulpit was created in the 19th century from Jacobean pieces. The north transept is floored with medieval tiles. The walls of the south transept are decorated with 13th-century painted red rosettes. In the north wall of the chancel is a stained glass window of 1927 designed by A. K. Nicholson. In the north transept are monuments, the oldest of which is dated 1382. A later monument dated 1632 is by Nicholas Stone. The two-manual pipe organ is located in a chamber to the north of the chancel. It was built in 1973 by Ward and Shutt. A marble plaque in the north transept commemorates Lieutenant Walter Smythe, who was killed at the siege of Mentz when serving in the Austrian army in the French Revolutionary Wars (1794), with carved figures of cannon, cannonball, drum, flags and a castle. Also inside the church is a plaque listing parish men who died serving in World War I while in the north porch a painted wooden plaque lists all who served in the same war, with indications of those who were wounded or died.

There is a ring of four bells. The oldest is dated 1650, and the other three were cast in 1912 by James Barwell and Company.

== External features ==
In the churchyard to the north of the church is a former font dating from the 15th or 16th century. It is in sandstone, and consists of a bowl standing on a stem with an octagonal base. The font is said to have been moved from a chapel at Acton Pigott, which had become disused by about 1730. The font is listed at Grade II. The churchyard also contains two war graves, both located in its south-west corner, of a Canadian soldier of World War I, and a British soldier of World War II.

== See also ==
- Grade I listed churches in Shropshire
- Listed buildings in Acton Burnell
