= Prior of Christ Church =

Clerical position at Canterbury Cathedral until 1539

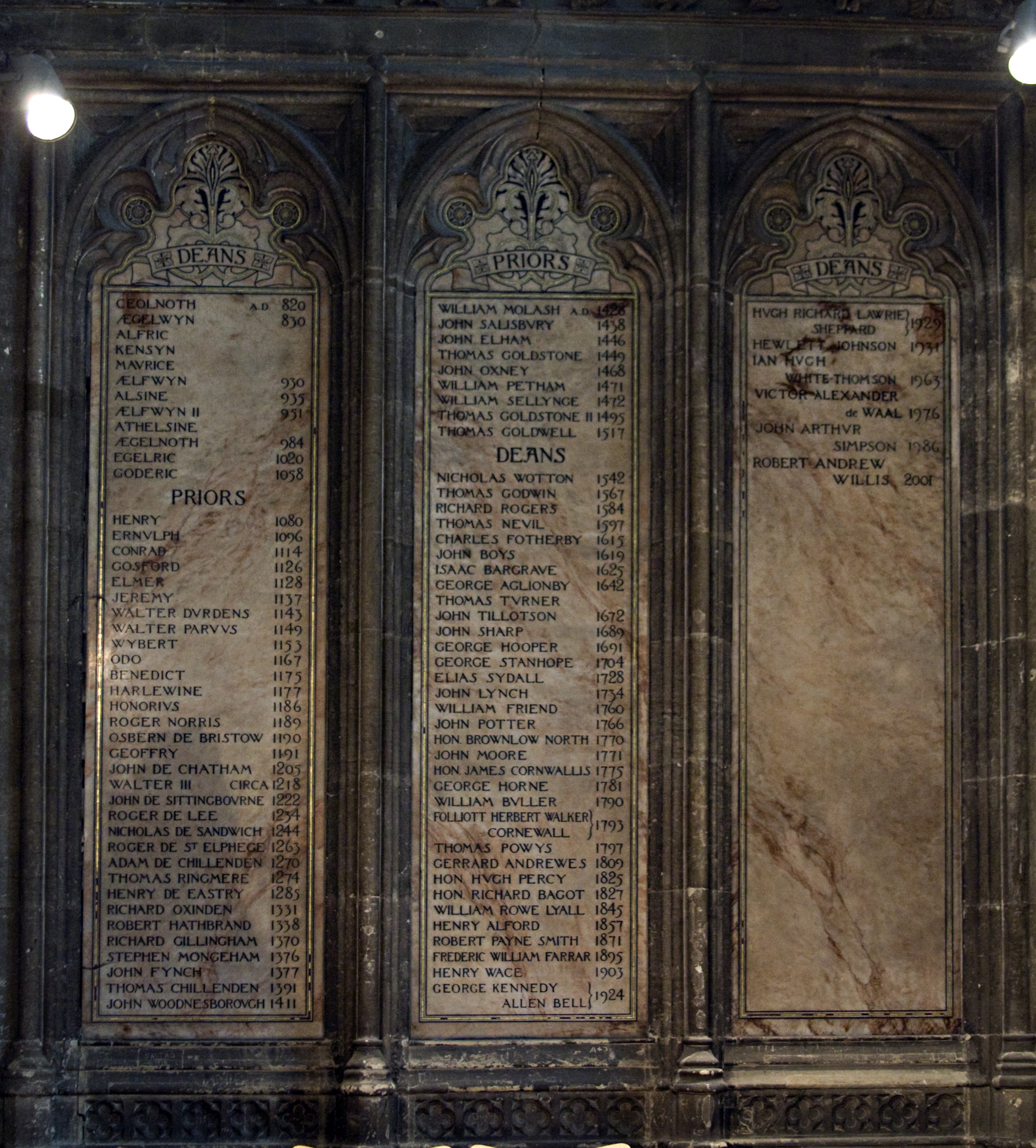
Inscribed panels in Canterbury Cathedral listing the priors

The prior of Christ Church served in Christ Church Cathedral Priory in Canterbury, attached to Canterbury Cathedral.

== Context ==
Canterbury Cathedral began life as cathedral for its city, diocese and archdiocese, headed by the Archbishop of Canterbury and run by a dean. However, when the cathedral was re-formed as a monastic institution (known as Christ Church Priory) as well as a cathedral, a Prior was put in charge of the monastery (with the Archbishop effectively acting as abbot). When in 1539 the monastery was dissolved and reverted to being solely a cathedral, the prior's duties reverted to a dean, the first of whom was Nicholas Wotton.

== List ==
- Henry 1080–1096
- Ernulf 1096–1107
- Conrad 1108–1126
- Gosford 1126–1128
- Elmer 1128–1137
- Jeremy / Jeremiah 1137–1143
- Walter Durdens 1143–1149
- Walter Parvus 1149–1153
- Wybert 1153–1167
- Odo 1167–1175
- Benedict 1175–1177
- Harlewine 1177–1179
- Alan 1179–1186
- Honorius 1186–1189
- Roger Norreis 1189–1190
- Osbern/Osbert de Bristow 1190–1191
- Geoffry (sic) 1191–1205
- John de Chatham 1205-c.1218
- Walter III c.1218–1222
- John of Sittingbourne 1222–1244
- Roger de Lee 1234–1244
- Nicholas de Sandwich 1244-1258
- Roger de St Elphege 1258–1263
- William (or Adam) Chillenden 1264–1274
- Thomas Ringmer(e) 1274–1284
- Henry de Eastry 1285–1331
- Richard Oxinden/Oxenden 1331–1338
- Robert Hathbrand 1338–1370
- Richard Gillingham 1370–1376
- Stephen Mongeham 1376–1377
- John Fynch 1377–1391
- Thomas Chillenden 1391–1411
- John Woodnesborough 1411–1428
- William Molash 1428–1438
- John Salisbury –1446
- John Elham 1446–1449
- Thomas Goldstone 1449–1468
- John Oxney 1468–1471
- William Petham 1471–1472
- William Sellynge 1472–1495
- Thomas Goldstone II 1495–1517
- Thomas Goldwell 1517–1539

== Sources ==
- Table of priors and deans at the west end of the south aisle of Canterbury Cathedral nave. See also reference.
- Victoria County History at British History Online
