= Goldwell =

Goldwell is a surname of English origin. Notable people with the surname include:

- James Goldwell, (d. 1499), a medieval Dean of Salisbury and Bishop of Norwich
- Thomas Goldwell (1501–1585), English bishop
- Thomas Goldwell, English prior

== See also ==
- Goldwell Open Air Museum, outdoor sculpture park near the ghost town of Rhyolite in the U.S. state of Nevada
