= Listed buildings in Acton Burnell =

Acton Burnell is a civil parish in Shropshire, England. It contains 25 listed buildings that are recorded in the National Heritage List for England. Of these, two are listed at Grade I, the highest of the three grades, two are at Grade II*, the middle grade, and the others are at Grade II, the lowest grade. The parish includes the village of Acton Burnell and the hamlet of Acton Pigott, and is otherwise rural. Most of the listed buildings are houses and associated structures, and the other listed buildings are a church, a font in the churchyard, a shop, farm buildings, and a bridge.

== Key ==
Grade	Criteria
I	Buildings of exceptional interest, sometimes considered to be internationally important
II*	Particularly important buildings of more than special interest
II	Buildings of national importance and special interest

== Buildings ==
Name and location	Photograph	Date	Notes	Grade
St Mary's Church; 52.61317°N 2.69039°W		c. 1275–80	The church was built for Robert Burnell and was restored in 1887–89 when a small tower was added. It is in sandstone with tiled roofs, and has a cruciform plan, consisting of a nave with a north porch, a chancel, north and south chapels acting as transepts, and a tower in the angle between the chancel and the north transept. The tower has three stages, clasping buttresses, a pyramidal roof with a weathervane, and a gabled dormer window on the west side. Along the eaves of the nave and transepts is a corbel table, some of the corbels being carved with heads. There is a priest's door on the south side of the chancel, and a hagioscope on the north side.	I
Acton Burnell Castle; 52.61287°N 2.68975°W		1284–85	A manor house built for Robert Burnell, it is now in ruins. The house is in red and grey sandstone and the roofs that remain are in stone-slate. It has a rectangular plan, with angle turrets, and the parapets are embattled. The walls on the north, west and east sides are almost intact, the south wall has been reduced to about half its height, and the internal walls have been removed. Cart entrances have been cut through the north and south walls.	I
Former font 52.61326°N 2.69035°W	—	15th or 16th century	The font is in the churchyard of St Mary's Church to the north of the porch, and has been moved from elsewhere. It is in sandstone, and has an octagonal base, stem and bowl, without any decoration.	II
10 Acton Burnell; 52.61380°N 2.69304°W	—	17th century	A cottage, timber framed with rendered infill, partly encased or rebuilt in brick, and with a tiled roof. It has one storey and an attic, and two bays with the gable end facing the road. In the centre of the front is a gabled porch with chamfered posts, and above it is a gabled dormer. The windows are casements, those on the front with hood moulds. The gables have shaped bargeboards and pendent finials.	II
19–22 Acton Burnell; 52.61381°N 2.69471°W		17th century	A row of four cottages that were altered and extended in the 19th century. The original cottages are timber framed with brick nogging, and the others are in brick painted to resemble timber framing. They have one storeys and attics, and the roof is tiled. There are five gabled dormers with shaped bargeboards, and the windows are casements. Each cottage has a gabled wooden porch with chamfered posts, curved braces, boarded tympana, and shaped bargeboards.	II
The White House; 52.61377°N 2.69442°W	—	17th century	A cottage, later divided into two, with remodelling and extensions in the mid-19th century. The original part is timber framed with red brick nogging, the extension is in brick, and it is all rendered. The roof is tiled, there is one storey with an attic, and the original part has two bays. The windows are casements with hood moulds, in the upper floor they are in dormers that have gables with scalloped bargeboards. On the front is a wooden gabled porch with chamfered posts, curved braces, a boarded tympanum, and plain bargeboards with a pendant finial.	II
3 and 4 Acton Pigott; 52.62050°N 2.67926°W	—	Late 17th century	Originally a timber framed house, it was altered and extended in brick in the late 19th and late 20th centuries. It has a dentil eaves cornice and a tiled roof. There is an L-shaped plan, consisting of a timber framed bay, with a two-bay timber framed cross-wing to the right, and a brick extension to the left. The windows are casements, and there are four gabled dormers. To the left is a recessed 20th-century garage extension, and at the rear is a conservatory.	II
Acton Lodge; 52.61600°N 2.69430°W	—	Late 17th century	A timber framed cottage that was remodelled in the mid-19th century and extended in the 20th century. The extensions are in brick, the whole is rendered, and the roof is tiled. There is one storey and an attic, and two bays. The windows are casements, and in the upper floor is a gabled dormer. The end facing the road is also gabled, and the gables have bargeboards with pendent finials. On the front is a wooden gabled porch with chamfered posts, curved braces, a boarded tympanum, and plain bargeboards with a pendant finial.	II
The Corner House; 52.61383°N 2.69411°W	—	Late 17th century	The house was remodelled, altered and extended in the 19th century. The original part is timber framed, and the extensions that form a parallel range at the rear are in stone. The house is rendered, and has a tiled two-span roof. There is one storey with an attic, and a front of two bays. There are two gabled half-dormers with bargeboards and pendent finials. In the centre is a porch with square columns and a frieze, and the doorway has pilasters.	II
The Lodge; 52.61380°N 2.69139°W	—	Late 17th century	A cottage, later the gate lodge to Acton Burnell Hall, it was remodelled in the late 18th century and extended in the 19th century. The original part is timber framed with rendered infill, and the extensions are in brick and stone. The lodge has a tiled roof and an irregular plan, with one storey and an attic. In the centre of the west front is a gable with pierced scalloped bargeboards, and to the left the timber framed part has two flat-roofed dormers, a doorway, and a window with an ogee-shaped head.	II
The Principal's House; 52.61375°N 2.69189°W	—	1714	A rectory, later a private house, it was altered in the 19th century. The house is in red brick on a plinth of red and grey sandstone, and has a slate roof. There are two storeys and an attic, and an L-shaped plan, with a main range and a projecting gabled wing on the left. The main range has four bays, and in the second bay is a round-arched porch with a panelled surround and a moulded cornice. On the front of the wing is a two-storey canted bay window with a dentilled eaves cornice. Most of the windows are sashes.	II
Acton Burnell Hall; 52.61395°N 2.68938°W		1731	A country house that was enlarged in 1753–58, refronted in 1814, and the chapel remodelled in 1845–46. In 1915 the interior was reconstructed following a fire. The house is stuccoed, on a plinth, with giant Tuscan pilasters, sill bands, an entablature, a blocking course, and a hipped slate roof. In the main range are two storeys and an attic, and a north front of seven bays. On the front is a tetrastyle portico with unfluted Ionic columns, an entablature, a pediment and scrolled side walls. The south front has nine bays and in the east front are two two-storey canted bay windows. To the southwest is a wing with three storeys and an attic, containing a chapel.	II*
Acton Pigott; 52.62094°N 2.67802°W	—	Mid 18th century	A red brick farmhouse with a dentil eaves cornice, parapeted gable ends, and a slate roof. There are two storeys, two parallel ranges, and two gabled rear wings. The windows are sashes, and there is a 20th-century porch.	II
South barn, Evenwood Farm; 52.61061°N 2.66285°W	—	18th century	The barn, which was altered in the 19th century, is timber framed on a stone plinth, with some replacement in brick, it is clad in weatherboarding and some corrugated iron, and has a tile roof. There is a single storey and six bays, and it contains various openings.	II
The Shell House; 52.60873°N 2.68817°W	—	Mid 18th century	A grotto in sandstone with an octagonal plan, a domed roof and pairs of windows flanking the doorway. Inside the building the walls and dome are covered with shells with a central boss, and on the lower parts of the walls are glazed picture tiles.	II
Keepers Lodge; 52.61020°N 2.67431°W		1779–80	Also known as Sham Castle, it is in rendered red brick on a stone plinth, and has a flat roof. The building is in Gothick style, and has a triangular plan. It has two storeys, circular corner turrets, and an embattled parapet. The windows in the upper storey have arched heads, Y-tracery, and hood moulds, and in the ground floor they have flat-arched heads.	II*
Ice House; 52.61160°N 2.68130°W	—	Late 18th or early 19th century	The ice house is in the grounds of Acton Burnell Hall. It is in red brick with sandstone around the entrance. The ice house has a rectangular plan, and a low doorway leading to a barrel vaulted interior, and above it is a mound of earth.	II
The Warren; 52.61374°N 2.69264°W		Late 18th or early 19th century	The house is in brick, and was altered in the mid- to late 19th century with the application of timber framing to the front, and sandstone extensions to the rear. The roofs are tiled, and there are two storeys, three bays, and a single-storey extension to the rear. Most of the windows are sashes, and on the front is a gabled porch.	II
The Old School House; 52.61375°N 2.69536°W	—	1815	A school, later a private house, it was extended in about 1845. It is rendered on a high plinth, with a hipped slate roof, and is in Gothick style. There is one storey and five bays, and at the rear are a wing with one storey and an attic, and a two-storey wing. On the front is a gabled porch with a segmental-headed doorway, and three windows with Gothick tracery and architraves with impost blocks and keystones.	II
14 and 15 Acton Burnell; 52.61366°N 2.69437°W	—	Early 19th century	A pair of sandstone cottages with red brick dressings, a dentil brick eaves cornice, and a tiled roof. The windows are casements, those in the ground floor with segmental heads. Each cottage has a gabled wooden porch with chamfered posts, curved braces, boarded tympana, and plain bargeboards with pendant finials. At the rear is an outshut with a catslide roof.	II
Acton Burnell Bridge; 52.61414°N 2.69744°W	—	Early 19th century	The bridge carries a road over a stream. It is in sandstone, and consists of a single segmental arch with voussoirs, impost blocks, projecting keystones, and flanking buttresses. The bridge has a string course, parapets with rounded coping, and square end piers.	II
Acton Burnell Stores; 52.61400°N 2.69484°W		Early 19th century	Originally two houses, then an inn, and subsequently a house and a shop, it is in red brick, partly rendered, on a stone plinth, with a dentil brick eaves cornice, and tiled roofs with a parapeted gable end. There are two storeys, an L-shaped plan, with a four-bay main range, and a gabled wing to the right. In the main range are sash windows, one blind window in the upper floor, and a gabled dormer. The wing contains a shop window and a doorway to the left with a pilastered surround.	II
Gate and gate piers, The Warren; 52.61387°N 2.69223°W		Early to mid 19th century	The gate piers are in cast iron, and have a square plan, pierced side panels, moulded bases and capitals, and pyramidal caps with globe finials. On each pier is a cast relief of a seated dog at the base, and of a stag's head on each face beneath the capital. Between the piers is a single wrought iron gate.	II
Granary, Evenwood Farm; 52.61060°N 2.66307°W		Mid 19th century	The granary, with a cartshed below, is in stone with brick dressings and a tile roof. There are two storeys and three bays. In the ground floor are three open bays with brick piers and timber lintels. The upper floor is approached by an external flight of brick steps, and it contains windows with metal frames and brick segmental arches.	II
Stable complex, Evenwood Farm; 52.61046°N 2.66251°W	—	Mid to late 19th century	The complex consists of a stable and hayloft, a cartshed, three pigsties, a store, and a detached privy, all forming a T-shaped footprint, and built in stone with brick dressings and tile roofs. The stable has two storeys, and contains a doorway and a window, and in the cartshed is a wide carriageway opening. In front of each pigsty is a yard enclosed by stone walls.	II
