= Concord College, Acton Burnell =

Coordinates: 52.6139°N 2.6893°W

Concord College
- Acton Burnell, Shropshire; United Kingdom

Information
- Type: Private, Day and Boarding
- Established: 1949
- Principal: Michael Truss
- Gender: Coeducational
- Age: 13 to 18
- Alumni: Concordians
- Website: http://www.concordcollegeuk.com/

Concord College is an independent co-educational international day/boarding school in Shropshire, England, situated in the grounds of Acton Burnell Castle. The college admits students aged between 12 and 19, the majority coming from overseas. Concord College excels academically, achieving 85% A*-A at A-level and 82% A*-A at GCSE level.

In 2009, to celebrate its 60th year, Concord was visited by the Princess Royal.

== History ==
The main building of Concord College is Acton Burnell Hall, which is the manor house of Acton Burnell Castle.

== Ranking ==
In 2016, The Times league table for independent co-educational schools in the UK placed Concord tenth. In 2022, The Telegraph ranked Concord College's A-level results at 16th among all UK independent schools, and 7th among those offering boarding.

== Notable alumni ==
- Zeinal Bava, telecoms entrepreneur
- Bowie Cheung (張寶兒), Hong Kong presenter and actress, Miss Hong Kong 2016 contestant
- Anthony Chow (周永健), practising solicitor of Hong Kong and England & Wales, former chairman of the Hong Kong Jockey Club, former president of the Law Society of Hong Kong
- Nensi Dojaka, Albanian fashion designer
- Marty Natalegawa, Indonesian Minister of Foreign Affairs
- Pim van Strien, member of the House of Representatives of the Netherlands (2021-)

== Notable staff ==
- Principal: Dr Michael Truss
- David Moyes worked as a football coach at Concord College while playing for Shrewsbury Town F.C.

== See also ==
- Listed buildings in Acton Burnell
