= Chillenden =

Village in Kent, England

Coordinates: 51.235°N 1.25°E

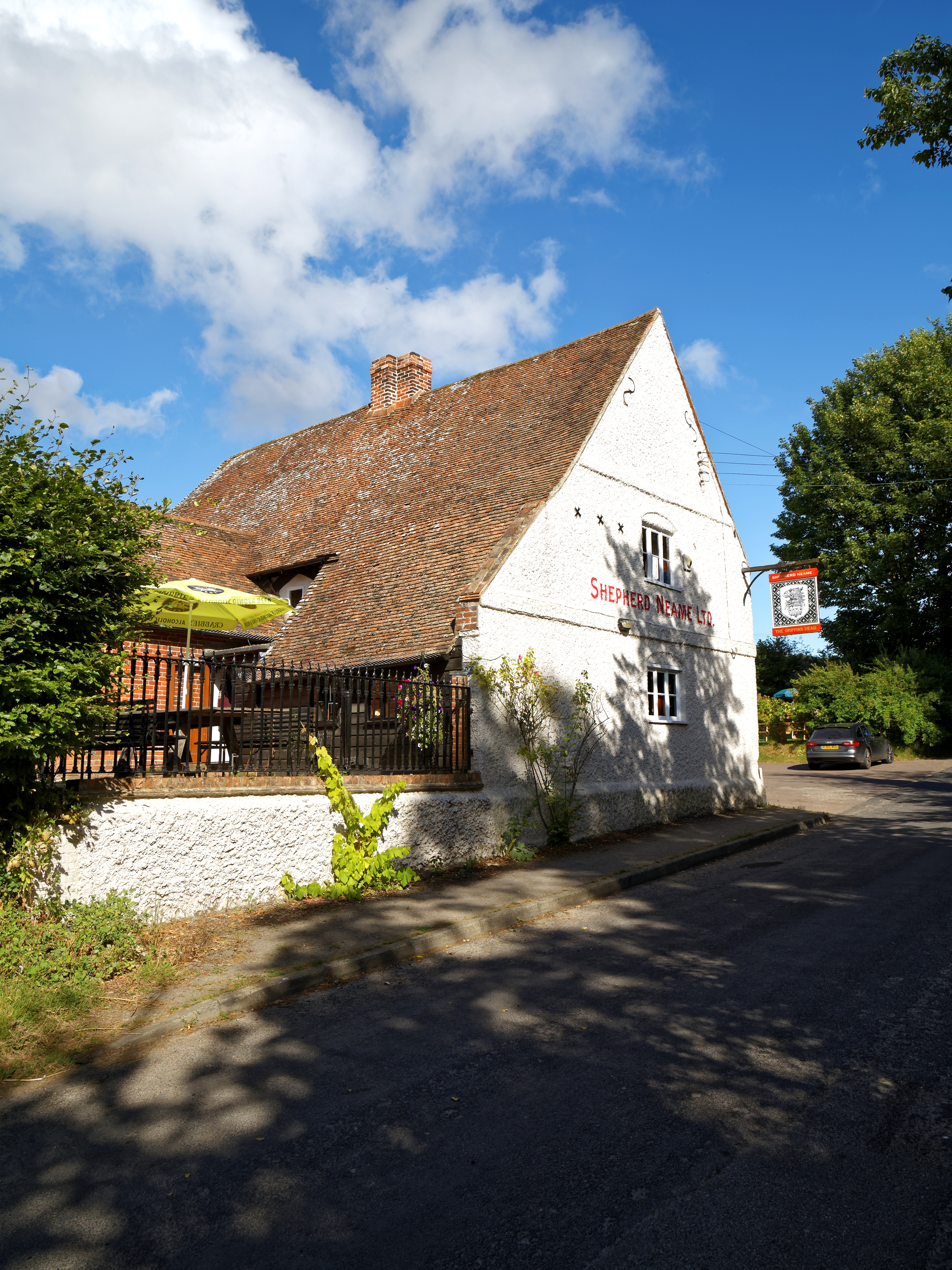
- The Grifins Head, Chillenden

- Location within Kent
- OS grid reference: TR2753
- Civil parish: Goodnestone
- District: Dover
- Shire county: Kent
- Region: South East
- Country: England
- Sovereign state: United Kingdom
- Post town: Dover
- Postcode district: CT15
- Police: Kent
- Fire: Kent
- Ambulance: South East Coast
- UK Parliament: Herne Bay and Sandwich

Chillenden is a village and former civil parish, now in the parish of Goodnestone, in the Dover district, in east Kent, England. It is between Canterbury and Deal. In 1931 the parish had a population of 130. On 1 April 1935 the parish was abolished and merged with Goodnestone.

In the Domesday Book of 1086, Chillenden was recorded as 'Cilledene'. The parish in 1800 was made up of 160 acres (65 ha), containing three farms: one belonging to a Mr. Hammond, the other two to Sir Brook Bridges. A pedlary fair was held here on Whit Monday.

The church, is dedicated to All Saints, in the priory of Ledes after being given to it by William of Norwich. The incumbency included three acres of glebe.

Chillenden Windmill, restored in 2005, lies just north of the village.

Chillenden was home to the families of Thomas Chillenden and William Chillenden, as indicated by their surnames.

A double murder occurred in Chillenden in 1996. Michael Stone was convicted of killing Lin Russell and her daughter Megan. Stone received a life sentence with parole available after 25 years.

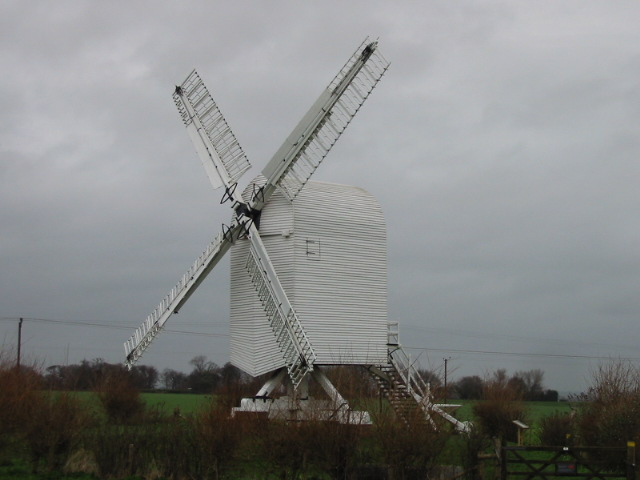
Chillenden Windmill

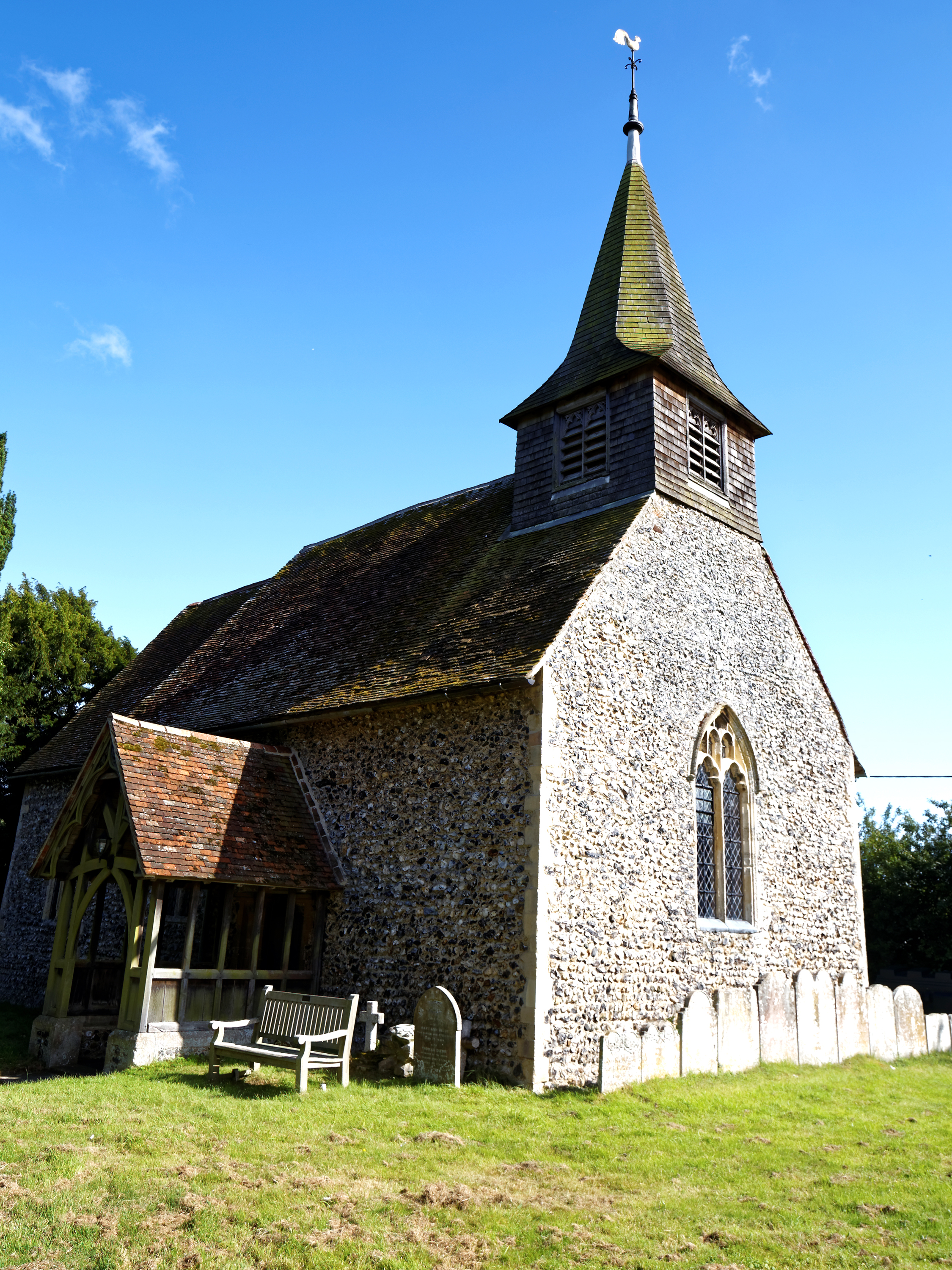
All Saints' church
