= Listed buildings in Frodesley =

Frodesley is a civil parish in Shropshire, England, containing six listed buildings recorded in the National Heritage List for England. One is listed at Grade II*, the middle of the three grades, while the others are at Grade II, the lowest grade. The parish includes the village of Frodesley and the surrounding countryside. The listed buildings comprise a small country house, two farmhouses, a cottage, a barn, and a church.

== Key ==
Grade	Criteria
II*	Particularly important buildings of more than special interest
II	Buildings of national importance and special interest

== Buildings ==
Name and location	Photograph	Date	Notes	Grade
Frodesley Lodge; 52.59427°N 2.71258°W		c. 1590	Originally a hunting lodge, later a small country house, it was extended in about 1750. The house is in sandstone on a chamfered plinth, and has a tile roof with coped parapeted gables. It has two and three storeys with an attic, and an L-shaped plan, consisting of a two-bay main range and a gabled cross-wing. The windows are mullioned, and in the angle is a two-storey lean-to porch. In the angle at the rear is a semicircular stair tower.	II*
Frodesley House Farmhouse; 52.60622°N 2.71743°W	—	16th or 17th century	The farmhouse was extended in about 1830 and altered later in the 19th century. The earlier part is timber framed, the extension is in brick, the latest part is rendered, and the roof is tiled. The latest part has two storeys and three bays. The windows are sashes, the porch has unfluted Doric columns, a frieze and a cornice and the doorway has a rectangular fanlight. Inside are timber-framed cross-walls.	II
Bentley Ford Farmhouse; 52.59434°N 2.73029°W	—	Mid 17th century	The farmhouse was extended in the 19th century. The original part is timber framed on a brick plinth, partly rebuilt in brick, and with a tile roof. There is one storey and an attic, a semi-basement at the left, four bays, rear outshuts and a projecting staircase wing. The windows are casements, and there are three full dormers. On the front is a gabled porch, and a doorway with a radial fanlight.	II
June Cottage; 52.60843°N 2.71837°W	—	Late 17th century	The cottage was extended in the 19th century. The original part is timber framed on a stone plinth. It has one storey and an attic, two bays, and contains two raking half-dormers. The extension is in sandstone with red brick dressings, and has two storeys. The roof is tiled and the windows are casements.	II
Frodesley Hall Farm Barn; 52.60646°N 2.71716°W	—	Early 18th century	The barn with an incorporated dovecote is in brick on a stone plinth, and has a tile roof. The barn has six bays, and inside are removed bricks for nesting boxes.	II
St Mark's Church; 52.60505°N 2.71637°W		1809	The north aisle was added in 1859. The church is in sandstone with a slate roof. It consists of a nave and a chancel in one cell, and a north aisle. At the west end is a square wooden bellcote that has a pyramidal roof and a weathervane.	II
