= Chillenden Windmill =

Open-trestle post mill in Kent, England

Chillenden windmill
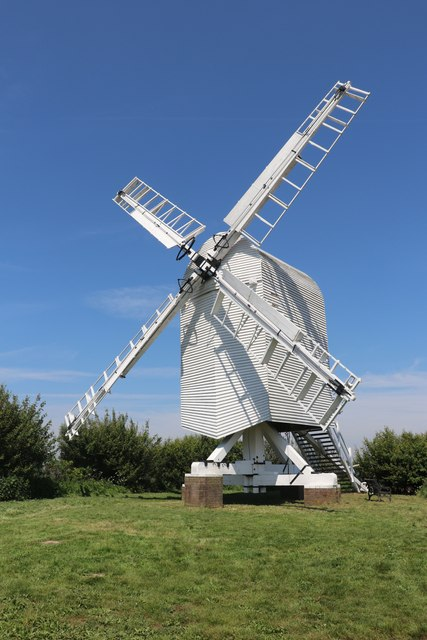
- Interactive map of Chillenden windmill

Origin
- Grid reference: TR 268 543
- Coordinates: 51°14′32″N 1°14′58″E
- Operator: Kent County Council
- Year built: 2005

Information
- Purpose: Corn milling
- Type: open trestle post mill
- No. of sails: Four
- Type of sails: Spring sails
- Windshaft: Cast iron
- Winding: Tailpole
- No. of pairs of millstones: Two pairs located in the breast
- Other information: Last post mill built in Kent.

Chillenden windmill is a grade II* listed open-trestle post mill north of Chillenden, Kent, England. It is the last post mill built in Kent.

== History ==
Chillenden windmill was built by Holman's of Canterbury in 1868, replacing an earlier post mill that had blown down. The new mill incorporated some material from the old one. A windmill was marked on Philip Symonson's map of 1596, John Speed's map of 1611, Robert Morden's map of 1695, Emanuel Bowen's map of 1736, Andrews, Drury and Herbert's map of 1769 and all Ordnance Survey maps from 1819. Holman's, the Canterbury millwrights, fitted a new stock and two new sails in 1927, and the mill was working until 1949, when it lost a sail in a gale. Local people raised some money in 1955 to make the mill weatherproof, and on 12 December 1957 the mill was bought for £100, by Kent County Council and restored at a cost of £728 although some machinery was removed.

== Collapse and rebuilding ==
Chillenden windmill collapsed on 26 November 2003. The collapse was attributed to the fact that one of the four piers on which the mill stood had sunk into the ground over time, and the mill's being in a fixed position, not facing directly into the prevailing wind at the time. The mill wreckage was carefully dismantled on 15 December 2003 and put into storage while a decision was made on the future of the building. There were rumours that the mill would be rebuilt at the Museum of Kent Life, but on 31 March 2004 Kent County Council announced that the mill was to be rebuilt on site. The restoration work was carried out by IJP Millwrights, of Binfield Heath, Berkshire. The work included new crosstrees and quarter bars, a new windshaft, both breast and tail of the mill rebuilt and new weatherboarding all over. Four new sails were made, replacing those on the mill at the time of its collapse. These had been fitted in 2001. By early May 2005, work had commenced on site re-erecting the frame of the mill. The reconstructed frame of the mill was erected on the new trestle on 25 May 2005. The mill reopened to visitors on 13 September 2005.

== Description ==
Chillenden windmill is a white open-trestle post mill with four spring sails carried on a cast-iron windshaft. The windshaft carries a cast-iron brake wheel with a wooden rim. The brake wheel has fifty wooden cogs, driving a cast-iron wallower on a cast-iron upright shaft. This carries a cast-iron great spur wheel which drives two pairs of underdrift millstones in the head of the mill. The mill formerly had a maize kibbler, but this was removed when the mill was restored in 1958. The mill is winded by a tailpole.

== Gallery ==
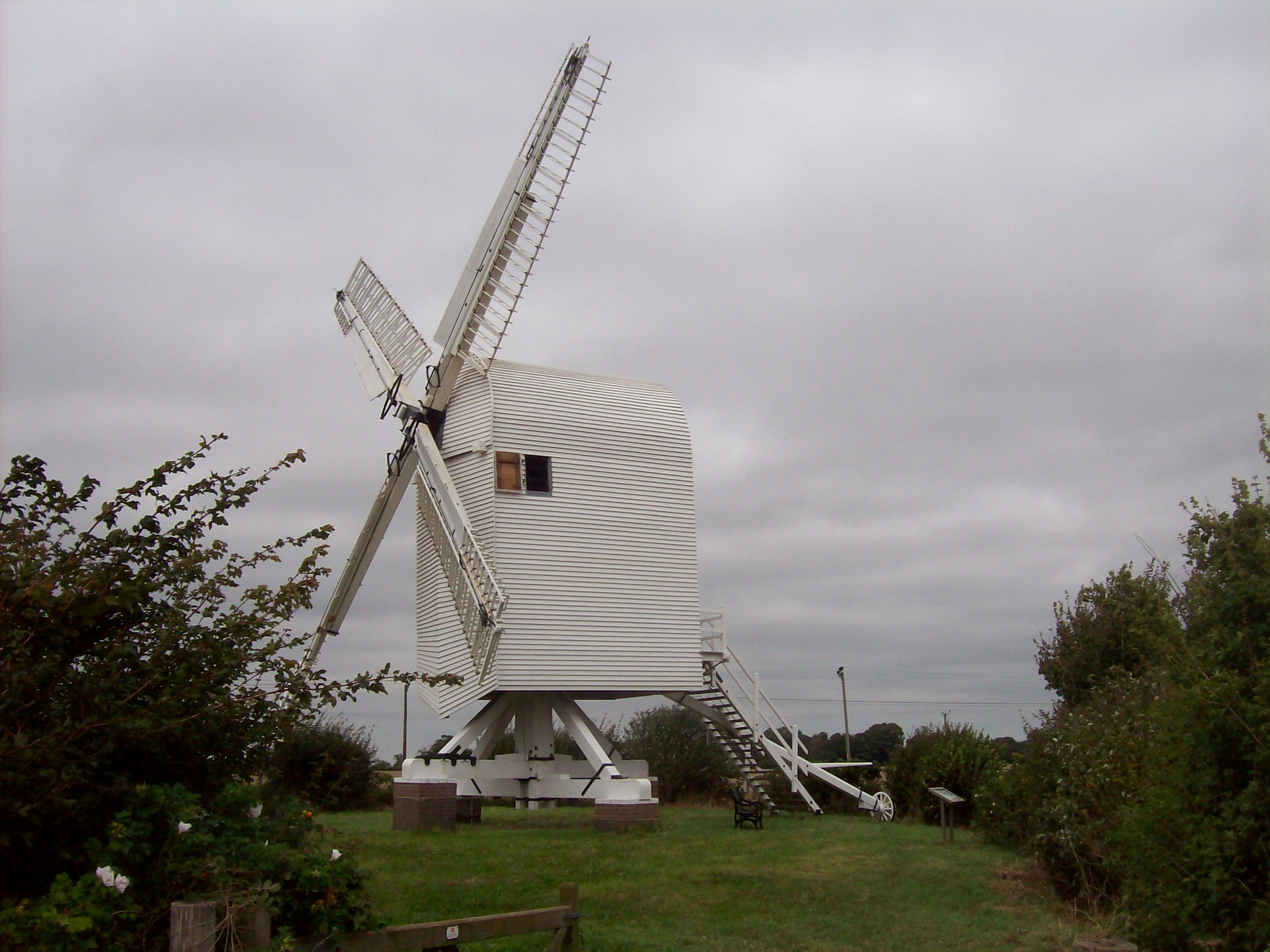
The mill in August 2008

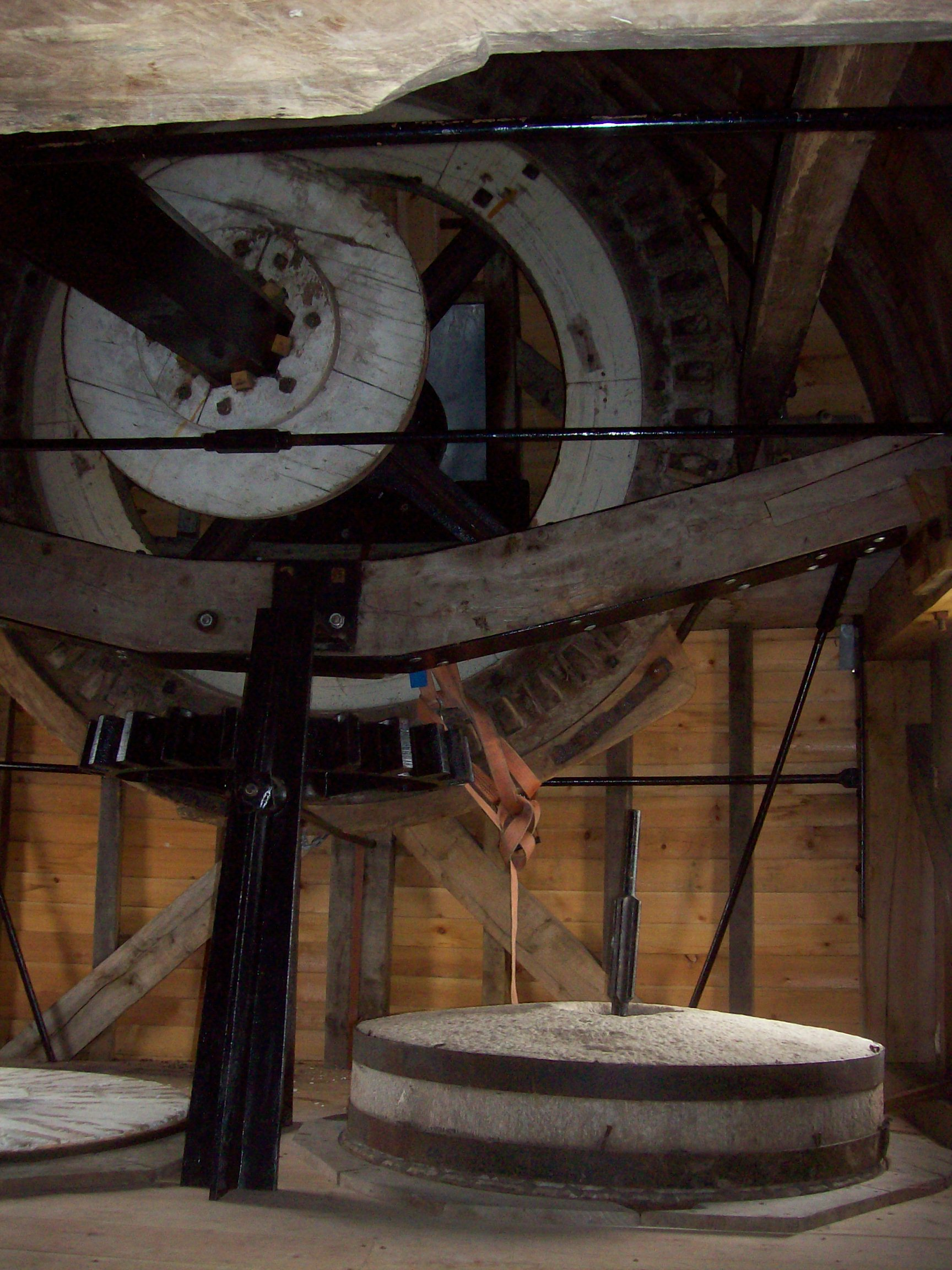
The stone floor

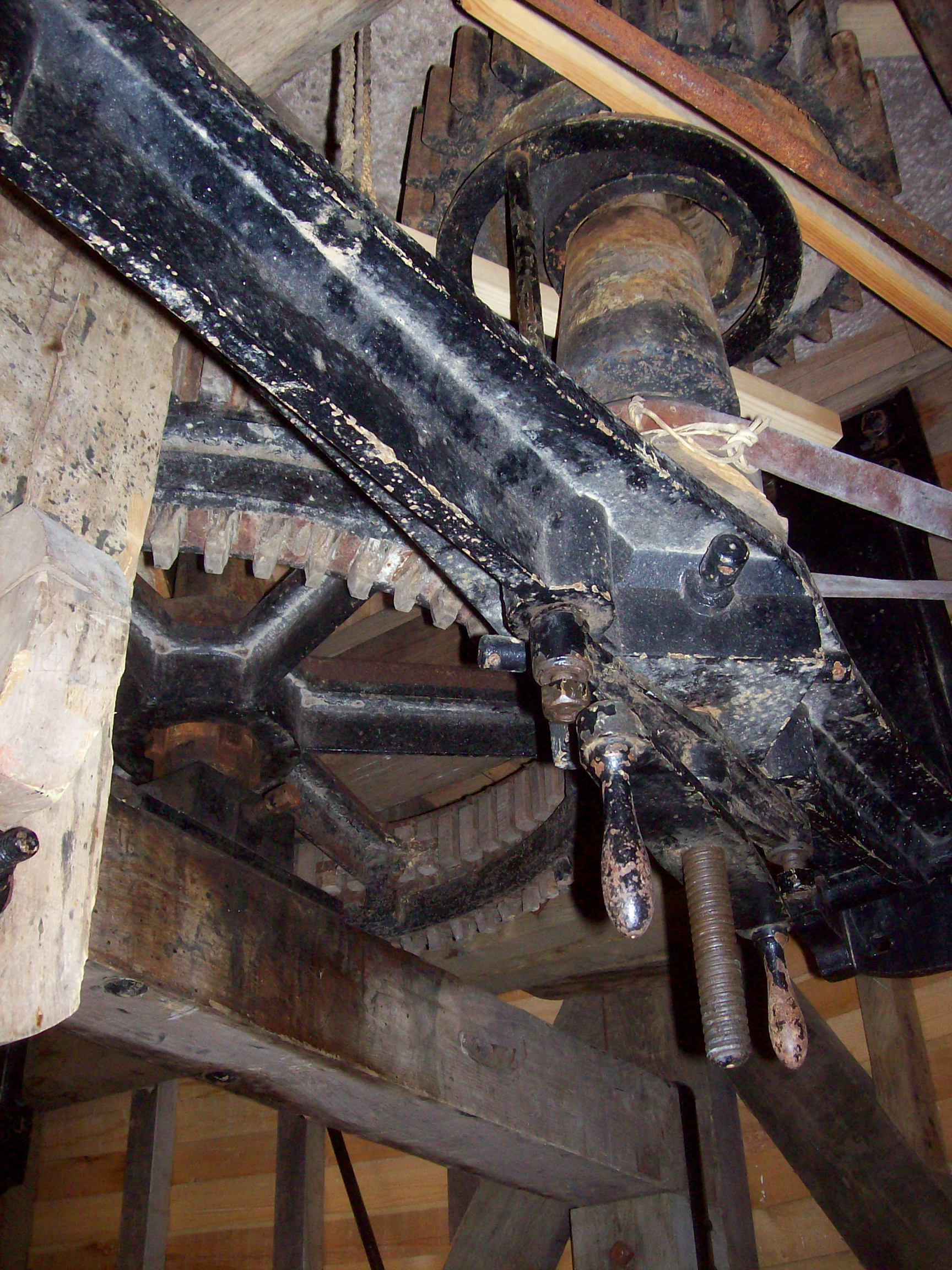
The meal floor

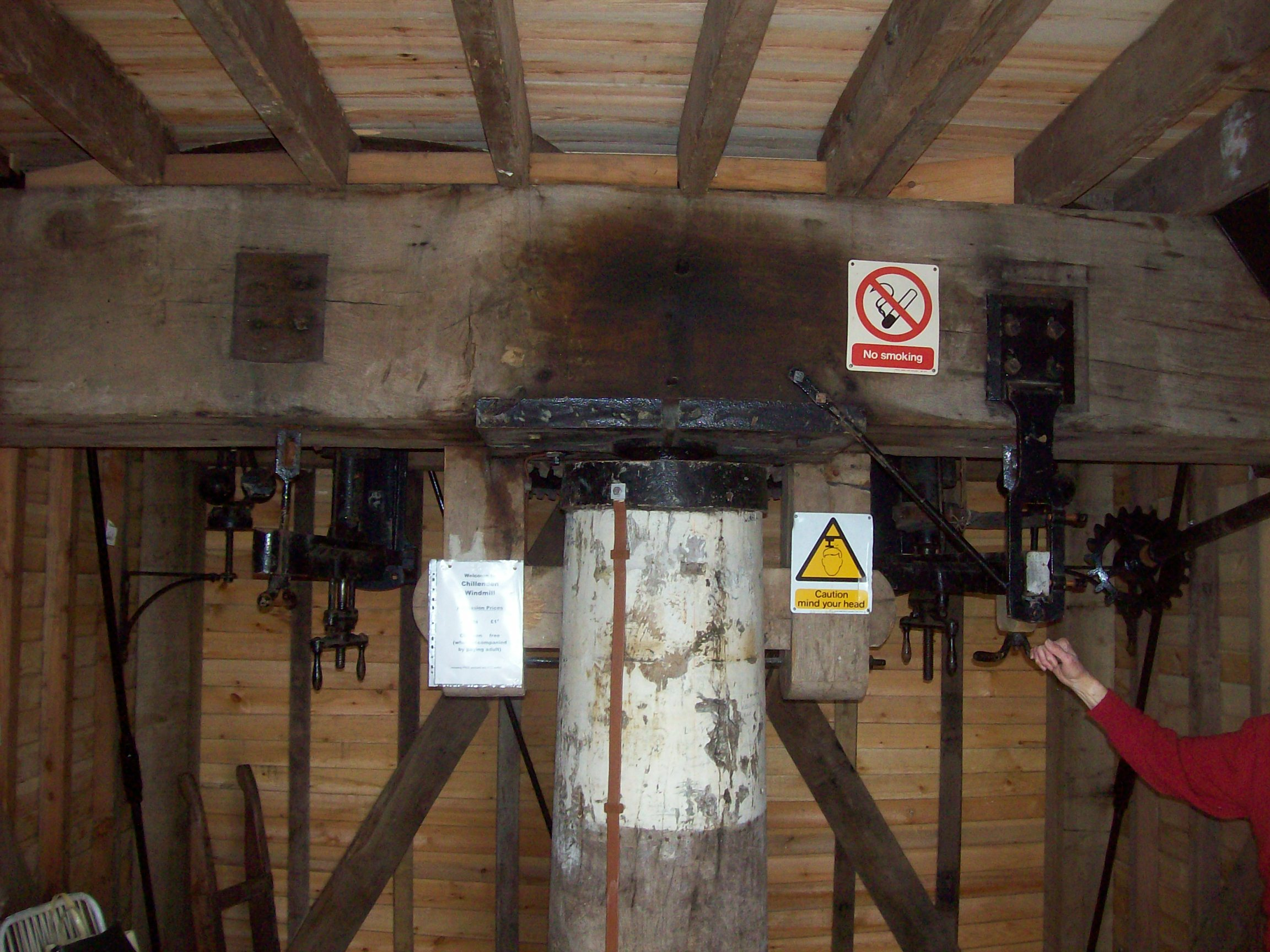
Post and Crown Tree

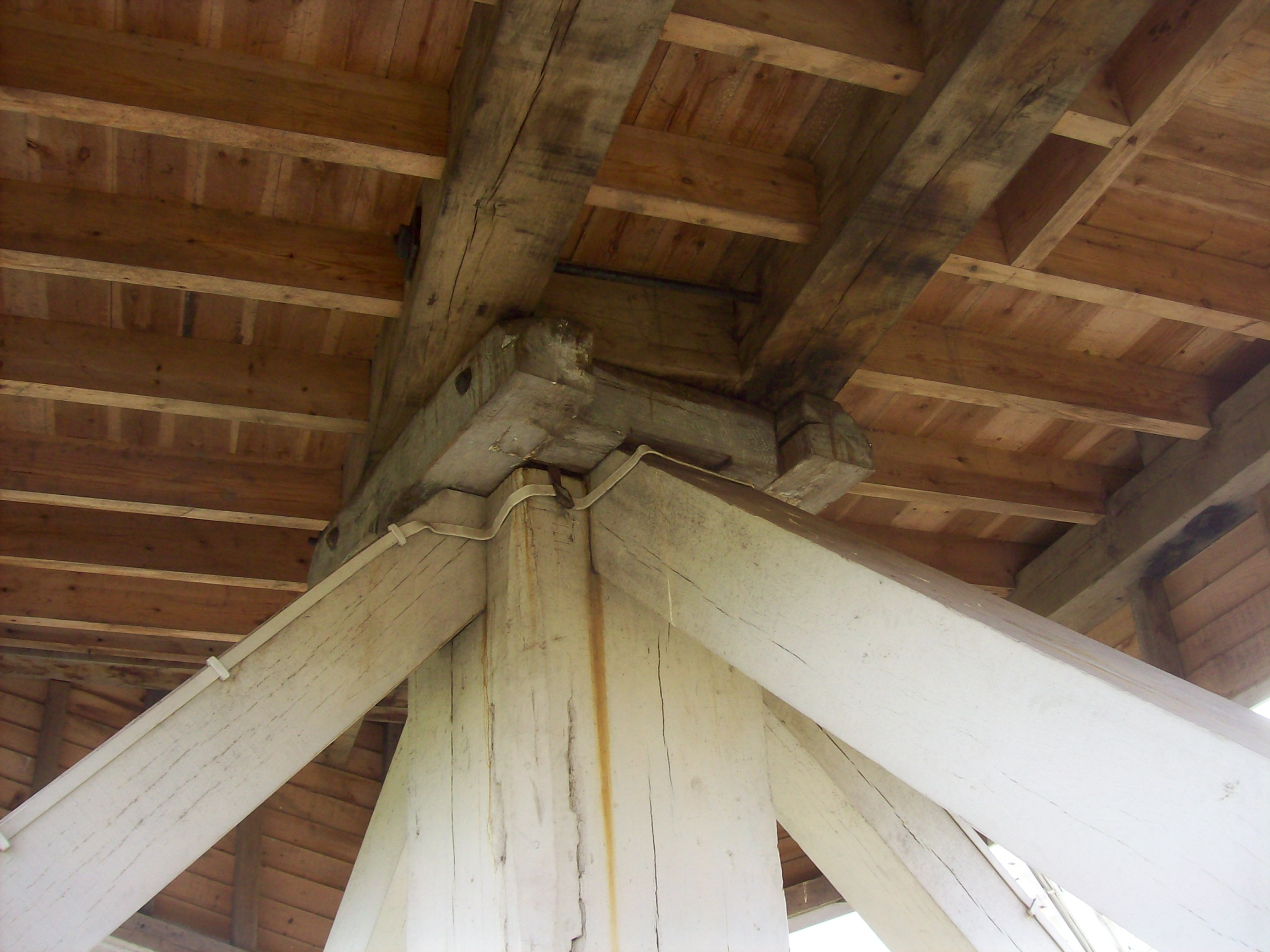
Top of trestle, showing collar

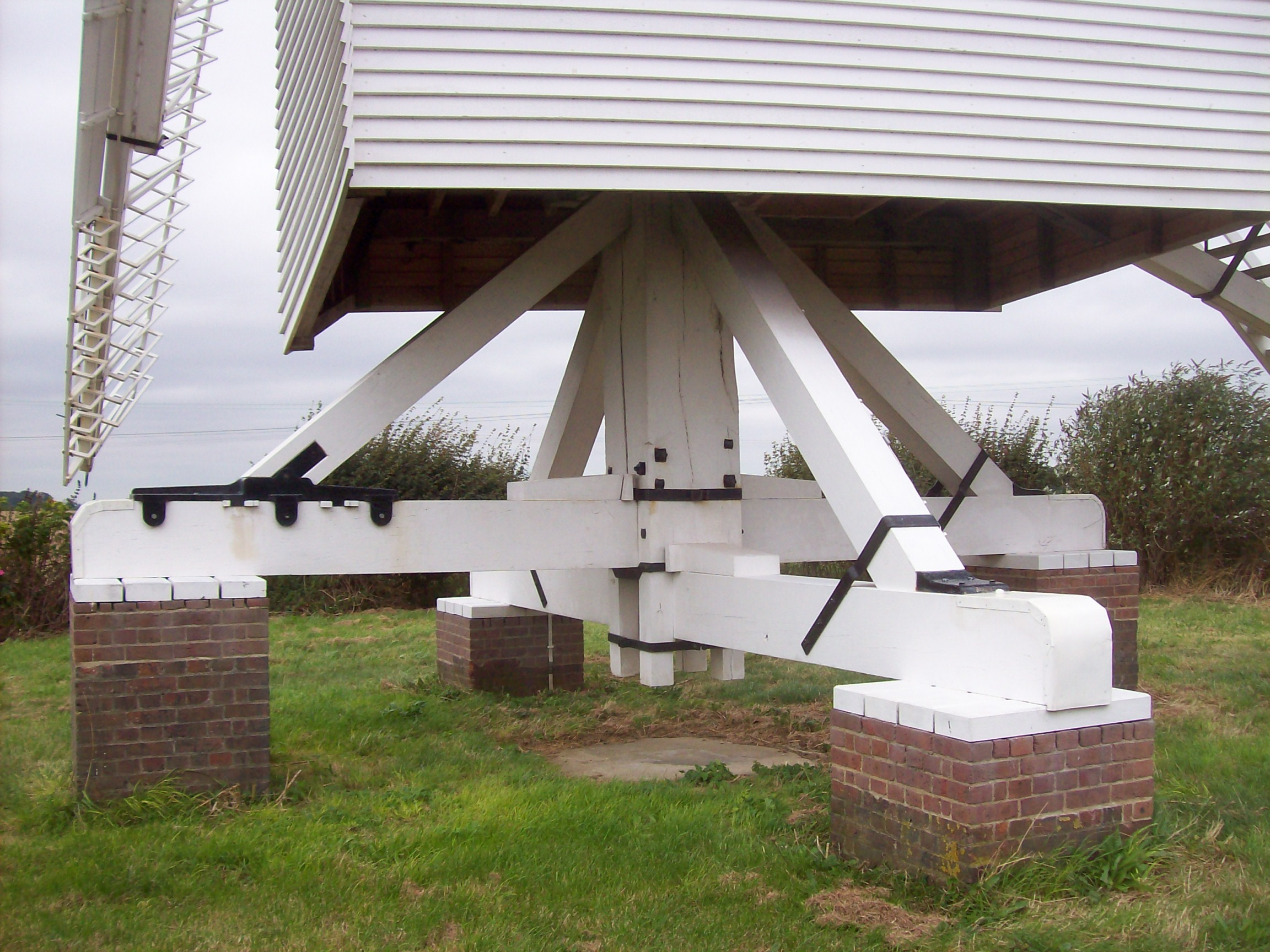
Bottom of trestle, showing crosstrees and quarter bars

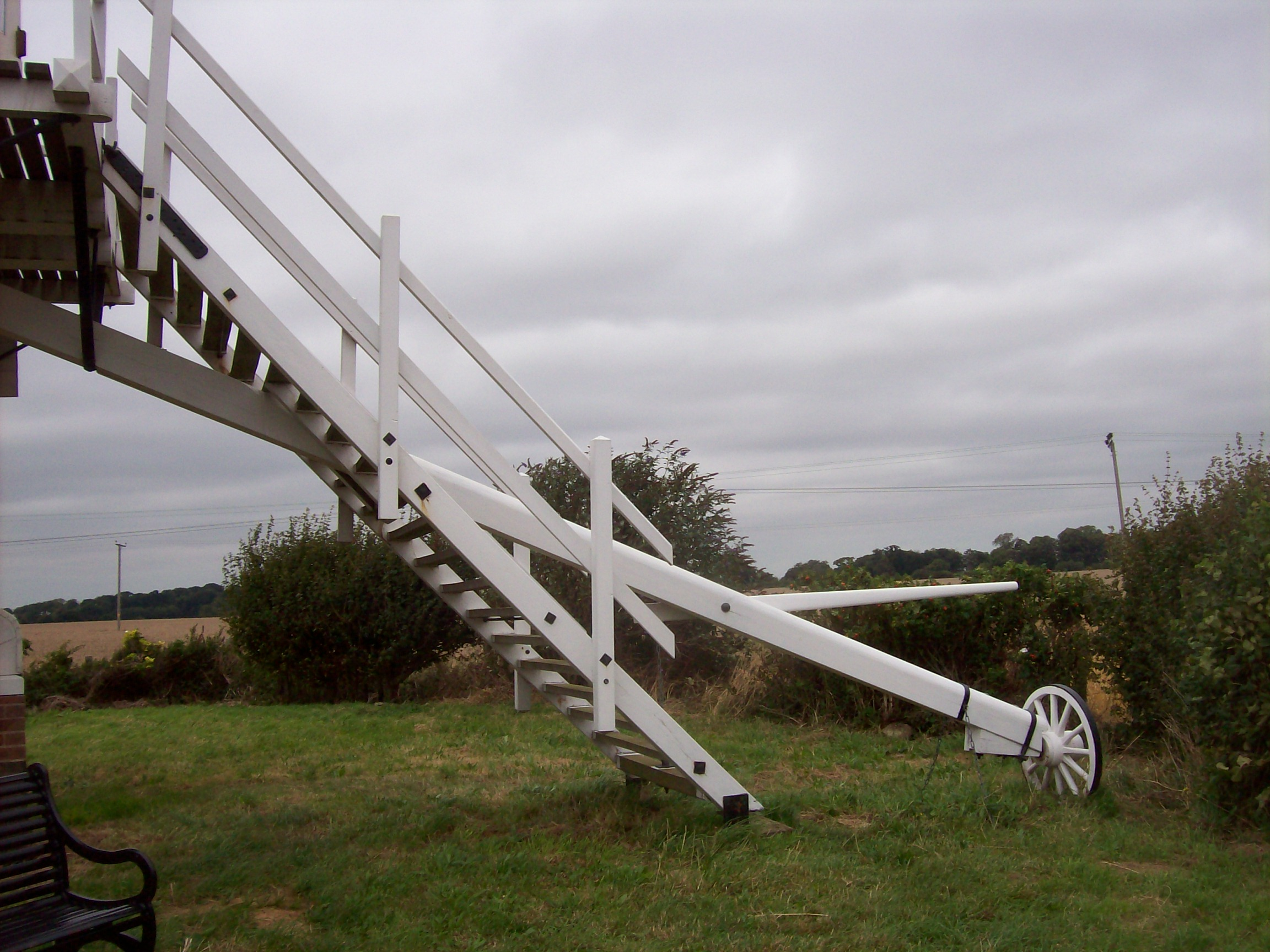
The ladder, tailpole and talthur

== Millers ==
- Haywood & Cage
- William Hopper Bean, 1882–99
- A Laker, 1930
- N W Laker, 1949

== See also ==
- Cobstone Windmill
- List of windmills in Kent
