= Pim van Strien =

Dutch politician (born 1977)

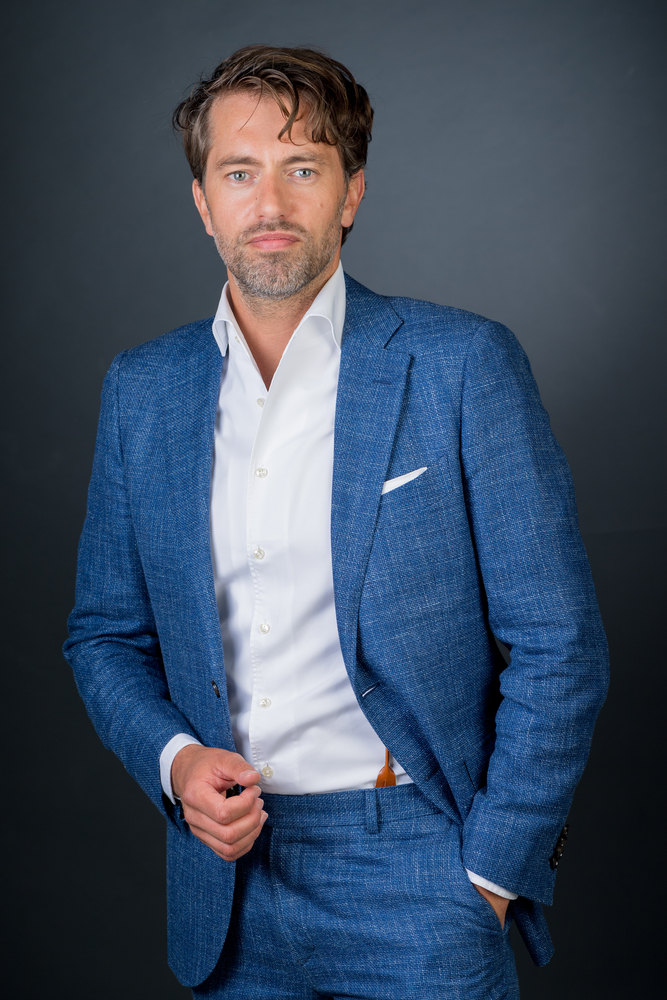

Member of the House of Representatives
- In office 31 March 2021 – 5 December 2023

Personal details
- Born: Pim Johannes Thomas van Strien; 29 April 1977 (age 49) Tilburg, Netherlands
- Party: People's Party for Freedom and Democracy
- Children: 2
- Education: Maastricht University
- Occupation: Press officer; political staffer; politician

Pim Johannes Thomas van Strien (born 29 April 1977) is a Dutch politician of the conservative-liberal People's Party for Freedom and Democracy (VVD) who served as a member of the House of Representatives. He previously worked as a press officer for the VVD and Ministry of Economic Affairs and Climate Policy.

== Early life and career ==
Van Strien was born in 1977 in the North Brabant city of Tilburg. He attended Concord College in the English county of Shropshire in the years 1993–95 before studying international law at Maastricht University. Van Strien was a member of the student association Circumflex and its debating society Ambiorix, and he interned at the United Nations as part of the staff of Secretary-General Kofi Annan.

He worked at the Ministry of Foreign Affairs and took a job at the VVD in 2006, initially serving as a political adviser and later as a press officer. Van Strien became chief spokesperson for Minister of Economic Affairs Henk Kamp (VVD) in 2014 after having served as one of his spokespeople for one year. Starting in 2018, he led the Ministry of Economic Affairs and Climate Policy's communication strategy and external affairs department.

== Politics ==
Van Strien was the VVD's 31st candidate in the 2021 general election and was elected to the House of Representatives with 463 preference votes. He was sworn in on 31 March. Van Strien's specialties in the House are the knowledge economy, industrial policy, economic innovation, media, and culture, and he is on the Committees for Art; for Digital Affairs; for Economic Affairs and Climate Policy; for Education, Culture and Science; for Finance; and for Foreign Trade and Development Cooperation (vice chair). He is also on the House's contact groups Germany, United Kingdom, and United States and on its delegation to the Benelux Parliament. In June 2021, when during the COVID-19 pandemic infections with the coronavirus were declining in the Netherlands, Van Strien called on the government to grant more permits for festivals and other cultural activities to support the struggling cultural sector. He also pled for the framing of an accord to improve the Dutch business climate. Van Strien had criticized a bill that would require companies to adhere to corporate social responsibility principles for this reason.

He lost his bid for re-election in November 2023, bringing an end to this membership of the House. After the VVD joined the Schoof cabinet in July 2024, Van Strien initiated a petition with fellow party members in which they criticized the party's cooperation with the right-wing populist Party for Freedom (PVV), calling themselves "De Liberale VVD" (The liberal VVD). He later criticized the cabinet's intended use of emergency powers to declare an asylum crisis, arguing that it could undermine core principles of the democratic rule of law. During a November 2024 VVD convention, Van Strien co-filed a motion urging politicians of the party to resist proposals that violate core liberal values. It was adopted with 79% of votes in favor after party leader Dilan Yeşilgöz had endorsed it.

== Personal life ==
While a House of Representatives member, Van Strien moved from the Amsterdam borough of Westerpark to Haarlem. He has a girlfriend and two sons, who were born in 2017 and 2020.

== Electoral history ==
Electoral history of Pim van Strien
Year	Body	Party	Pos.	Votes	Result		Ref.
Year	Body	Party	Pos.	Votes	Party seats	Individual	Ref.
2021	House of Representatives	People's Party for Freedom and Democracy	31	463	34	Won	
2023	House of Representatives	People's Party for Freedom and Democracy	34	853	24	Lost	
