= Acton Pigott =

Hamlet in Shropshire, England

Coordinates: 52.623°N 2.674°W

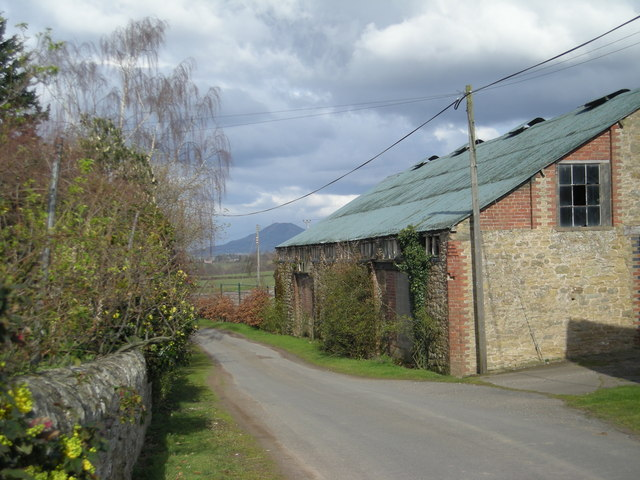
- Acton Pigott with The Wrekin in the background

- Location within Shropshire
- OS grid reference: SJ543030
- Civil parish: Acton Burnell
- Unitary authority: Shropshire
- Ceremonial county: Shropshire
- Region: West Midlands
- Country: England
- Sovereign state: United Kingdom
- Post town: SHREWSBURY
- Postcode district: SY5
- Dialling code: 01694
- Police: West Mercia
- Fire: Shropshire
- Ambulance: West Midlands
- UK Parliament: Shrewsbury and Atcham

Acton Pigott is a hamlet in the English county of Shropshire. It lies just outside the village of Acton Burnell.

== See also ==
- Listed buildings in Acton Burnell
