= Canterbury College, Oxford =

Former college of the University of Oxford

Canterbury College
- University of Oxford
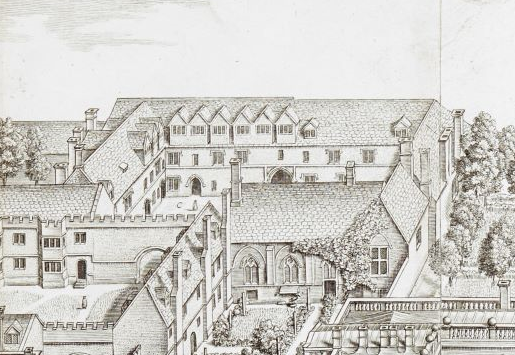
- The surviving buildings of Canterbury College as they appeared in 1675
- Location: Subsumed into Christ Church, Oxford
- Coordinates: 51.75095°N 1.25421°W
- Full name: The Warden and Scholars of Canterbury College, Oxford
- Latin name: Collegium Cantuariensis Oxon
- Founder: Simon Islip, Lord Archbishop of Canterbury
- Established: 20 October 1361
- Closed: 10 April 1540
- Named for: Christ Church Priory Canterbury
- Warden: Last warden: William Sandwych

Map
- Location within Oxford city centre

Canterbury College was a University of Oxford college, owned and run by Christ Church Priory, Canterbury. Shortly after the dissolution of the monasteries, the college's hall, chapel and other buildings were surrendered on 10 April 1540 and acquired by Christ Church.

== Background ==
The Priory first sent 4 monks to study in Oxford in 1311, in a hall it had bought there near the church of St Peter-in-the-East, but the actual college was founded in 1361 by Simon Islip, Lord Archbishop of Canterbury, in the parish of St Edward, opposite Oriel College. The Royal Licence was granted by the King Edward III for the foundation of college and advowson of Pagham on the 20th of October 1361. It was to consist of twelve students (initially 4 monks and 8 "secular clerks" – i.e. ordained clergy who were not monks), under a warden, who would be a monk chosen by the Priory's prior and admitted by the archbishop. Its endowment was granted in 1363, and included the church of Pagham, Sussex, along with (initially) eight Oxford houses' rents and a portion of the rents from Woodford, Northamptonshire and Worminghall, Buckinghamshire, where the Priory had manors. Other endowments came in 1373, 1380, and 1392, eventually coming to about £86 a year, although these all gradually disappeared.

The licence to acquire land for building was only given in 1364–1365. Islip pulled out the monks and appointed as warden a secular clerk named, John Wycliffe. Then in 1366 Islip's successor as archbishop, Simon Langham, wished to put the monks back in place and litigation at the Roman Curia ensued. In 1368 Langham was appointed Cardinal and his influence induced the Curia to give judgment in favour of the monks in 1370. One more monk was added in 1383, with the Priory paying for all 5 monks' maintenance at 10 pennies per week per monk. One of its students from Canterbury Priory was Thomas Chillenden, later Prior of the monastery. Rooms were rented to other Benedictine monasteries' members, including Rochester, Coventry, Battle, Peterborough, and Evesham, though all inmates were to a greater or lesser extent subject to Gloucester College's 'prior studentium'. Lay students were occasionally admitted to the college to make up numbers and provide some income. In 1426 the 'prior studentium' complained that Canterbury College's students were breaking Benedictine rules on eating meat.

Shortly after the dissolution of the monasteries by Henry VIII, the college's hall, chapel and other buildings were surrendered on 10 April 1540 and acquired by Christ Church.

In 2019, the Canterbury Institute was founded in memory of Canterbury College, by Dr Dominic Burbidge. The Institute focuses on rediscovering the academic vocation and is located adjacent to Christ Church on St Aldate's.

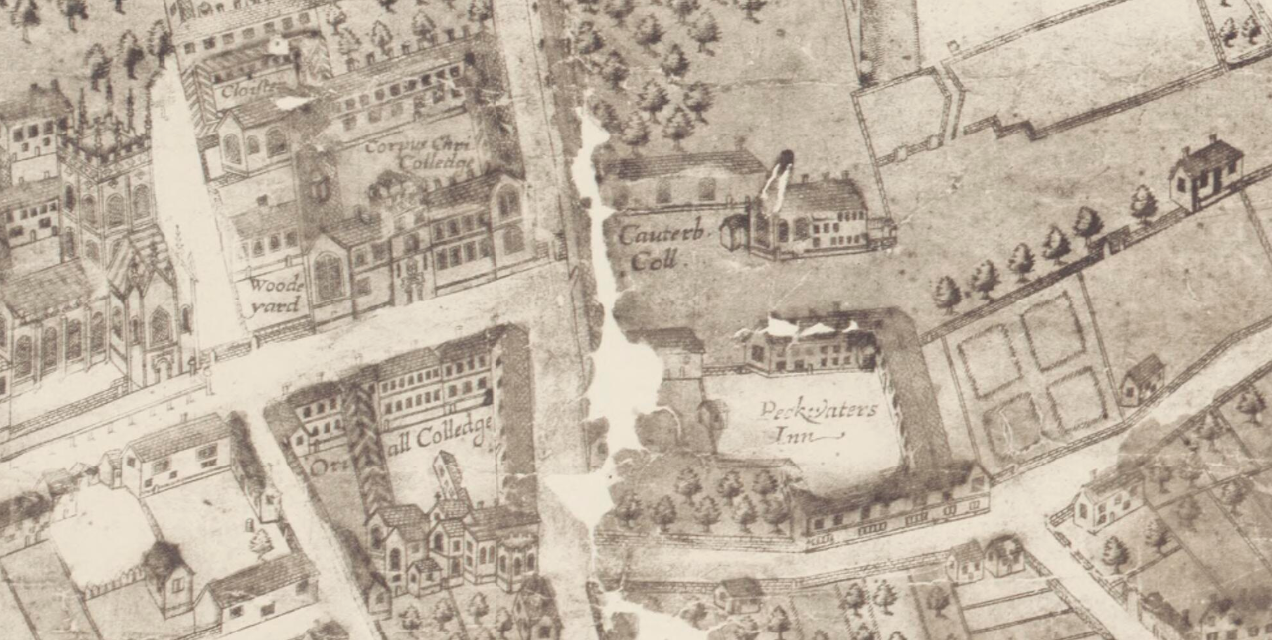
Buildings of Canterbury College in 1588

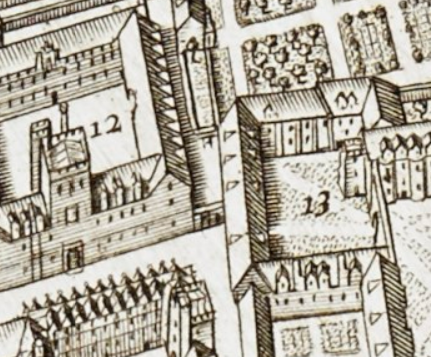
Buildings of Canterbury College in 1675

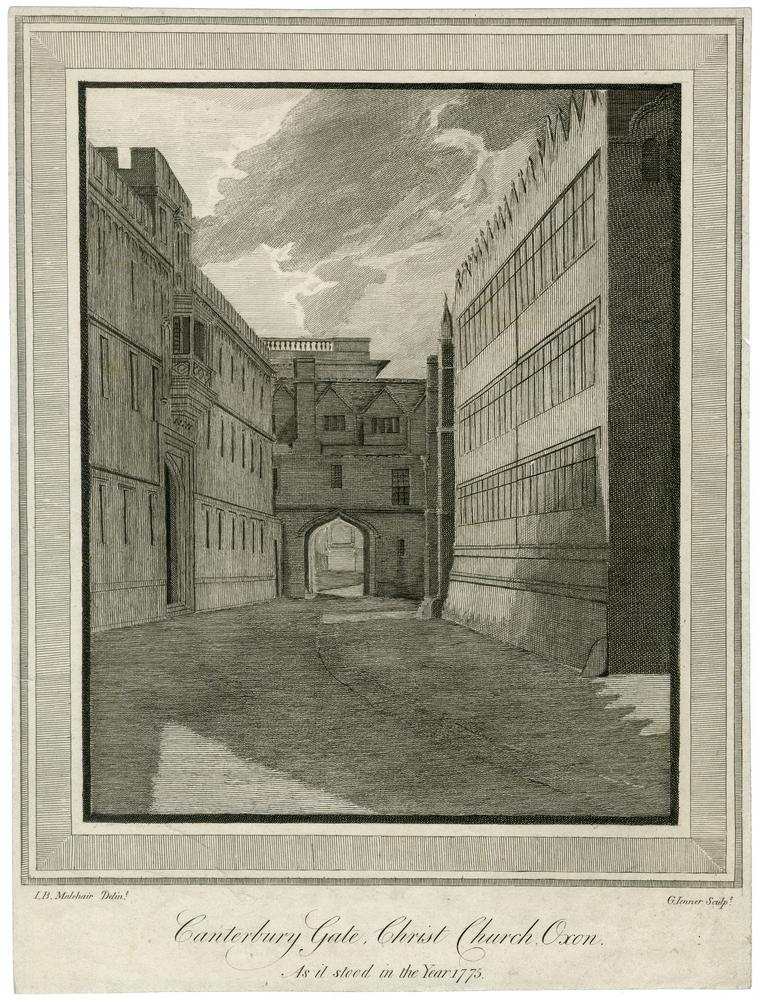
Old Canterbury Gate at Christ Church before demolition

== See also ==
- Canterbury Quadrangle

== Sources ==
- 'Houses of Benedictine monks: Canterbury College, Oxford', A History of the County of Oxford: Volume 2 (1907), pp. 68. Date accessed: 31 October 2007.
- Map of Oxford, c.1375
