= Robert Kilwardby =

Archbishop of Canterbury from 1272 to 1278

His Eminence Robert Kilwardby OP
- Cardinal, Archbishop of Canterbury; Primate of All England
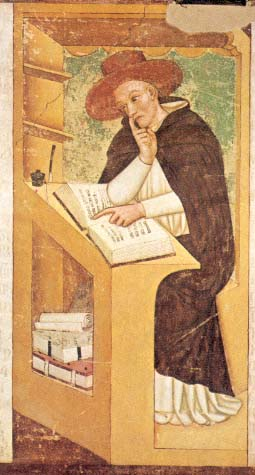
- Appointed: 11 October 1272
- Term ended: 5 June 1278
- Predecessor: William Chillenden
- Successor: Robert Burnell
- Other post: Cardinal Bishop of Porto and Santa Rufina

Orders
- Consecration: 26 February 1273 by William of Bitton (II.)
- Created cardinal: 12 March 1278
- Rank: Cardinal bishop

Personal details
- Born: c. 1215 England
- Died: 11 September 1279 Viterbo
- Buried: Dominican convent, Viterbo
- Education: University of Paris

Ordination history
History
Episcopal consecration
- Principal consecrator: Bishop William of Bitton (II.)
- Co-consecrators: Nicholas of Ely, Hugh Belsham, O.P., Walter Bronscombe, Godfrey Giffard, and Anian Schonaw, O.P.
- Date: 26 February 1273
Cardinalate
- Elevated by: Pope Nicholas III
- Date: 12 March 1278
Episcopal succession
Bishops consecrated by Robert Kilwardby as principal consecrator
- Robert Wickhampton: 13 May 1274
- Walter de Merton: 21 October 1274
- Saint Thomas Cantilupe: 8 September 1275
- Gerard Grandison: 29 March 1276
- Bishop William Middleton: 29 May 1278
- John Bradfield, O.S.B.: 29 May 1278

Robert Kilwardby OP (c. 1215 – 11 September 1279) was an Archbishop of Canterbury in England and a cardinal. Kilwardby was the first member of a mendicant order to attain a high ecclesiastical office in the English Church.

== Life ==
Kilwardby studied at the University of Paris, then was a teacher of grammar and logic there. He then joined the Dominican Order and studied theology, and became regent at Oxford University before 1261, probably by 1245. He was named provincial prior of the Dominicans for England in 1261, and in October 1272 Pope Gregory X appointed him as Archbishop of Canterbury to end a dispute over the election. Kilwardby was provided to the archbishopric on 11 October 1272, given the temporalities on 12 December 1272, and consecrated on 26 February 1273.

Kilwardby crowned Edward I and his wife Eleanor as king and queen of England in August 1274, but otherwise took little part in politics. He instead concentrated on his ecclesiastical duties, including charity to the poor and donating to the Dominicans.

In 1278 Pope Nicholas III named Kilwardby Cardinal Bishop of Porto and Santa Rufina. He then resigned Canterbury and left England, taking with him papers, registers and documents belonging to the see. He also left the see deep in debt again, after his predecessor had cleared the debt. While in theory this was a promotion, probably it was not, as the pope was unhappy with Kilwardby's support of efforts to resist the payment of papal revenues and with the lack of effort towards the reforms demanded at the Second Council of Lyon in 1274.

He died in Italy in 1279, and was buried in the Dominican convent in Viterbo.

== Reputation ==
Kilwardby's theological and philosophical views were summed up by David Knowles who said that he was a "conservative eclectic, holding the doctrine of seminal tendencies and opposing...the Aristotelian doctrine of the unity of form in beings, including man." Some sources state that he was the author of Summa Philosophiae, a history and description of the schools of philosophical thought then current, but the writing style is not similar to his other works, and Knowles, for one, does not believe it was authored by Kilwardby.

It has been alleged that Kilwardby was an opponent of Thomas Aquinas. In 1277 he prohibited the teaching of thirty theses, some of which have been thought to touch upon Thomas Aquinas' teaching. Recent scholars, however, such as Roland Hissette, have challenged this interpretation.

== Works ==
Writings on grammar

- Commentaria Priscianus minor (A Commentary on the books 17 and 18 of Priscian's Institutiones grammaticae)

Writings on logic

- Notulae super librum Praedicamentorum
- Notulae super librum Perihermeneias
- Notule libri Priorum
- Notule libri Posteriorum
- Comentum super librum Topicorum
- Notulae super librum Porphyrii
- De natura relationis
- Priorum Analyticorum expositio
- Notuale super librum Sex Principiorum

Writings on natural philosophy

- De spiritu fantastico sive de receptione specierum
- De tempore

Writings on ethics

- Quaestiones supra libros Ethicorum
- Quaestiones in librum primum Sententiarum
- Quaestiones in librum secundum Sententiarum
- Quaestiones in librum tertium Sententiarum
- Quaestiones in librum quartum Sententiarum
- De ortu scientiarum

De tempore has been edited and translated by Alexander Broadie, and published as On Time and Imagination, Part 2: Introduction and Translation. A critical edition of De ortu scientiarum was published by Albert G. Judy, for The Pontifical Institute of Mediaeval Studies in 1976. A critical edition of the four volumes of Quaestiones in librum Sententiarum was published in five volumes in 1982–1993 by Elisabeth Gössmann, Gerhard Leibold, Richard Schenk and Johannes Schneider for the Bavarian Academy of Sciences and Humanities.

The Notuel libri Priorum (on Aristotle's Prior Analytics), has been edited and translated by Paul Thom and John Scott (Oxford: Published for the British Academy by Oxford University Press, 2015; two volumes).

Kilwardby was also the author of a summary of the writings of the Church Fathers, arranged alphabetically, Tabulae super Originalia Patrum, edited by Daniel A. Callus (Bruges: De Tempel, 1948).

== Citations ==
Catholic Church titles
Preceded by William Chillenden as archbishop-elect	Archbishop of Canterbury; 1273–1278	Succeeded by Robert Burnell as archbishop-elect
Preceded by John of Toledo	Cardinal Bishop of Porto and Santa Rufina; 1278–1279	Succeeded by Bernard de Languissel
