= Frodesley =

Village in Shropshire, England

Coordinates: 52.608°N 2.719°W

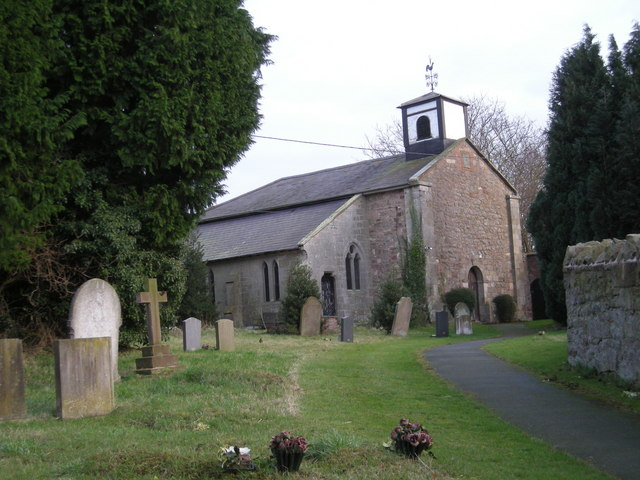
- St Mark's Church, Frodesley

- Location within Shropshire
- Population: 256 (2011)
- OS grid reference: SJ513014
- Civil parish: Frodesley
- Unitary authority: Shropshire
- Ceremonial county: Shropshire
- Region: West Midlands
- Country: England
- Sovereign state: United Kingdom
- Post town: SHREWSBURY
- Postcode district: SY5
- Dialling code: 01694
- Police: West Mercia
- Fire: Shropshire
- Ambulance: West Midlands
- UK Parliament: Shrewsbury and Atcham

Frodesley (/frɒdzli/ FRODZ-lee) is a tiny village and civil parish in the English county of Shropshire, and is situated partly within the Shropshire Hills Area of Outstanding Natural Beauty. The population of the civil parish at the 2011 census was 256. The population was 223 in the 2021 census. Nearby villages are Acton Burnell and Longnor.

The parish has an area of about 900 hectares and lies between two hills, one at 145 metres on arable land, the other Lodge Hill rising to 304 metres and forested. The latter consists of Hoar Edge Grit, a tough Ordovician sandstone quarried for the construction of Viroconium. The forest is also known as Causeway Wood, possibly on account of a Roman track used to convey stone to the main road. There is a conjecture that this causeway corresponds to a bridleway running from the north-east edge of the forest.

The area is agricultural, predominantly livestock with some arable.

== History ==
A document from 1848 mentions the discovery near Frodesley Lodge of a Roman votive altar dedicated to the goddesses of Britain and bearing the name L Caractacus.

The name probably derives from an Anglo-Saxon chief "Frod" who was the founder, and leah or clearing. It is mentioned in the Domesday Book: one hide paying tax, land for two ploughs, woodland for 30 pigs, valued at eight shillings. Most of Frodesley extends perpendicular to the south-west extension the Roman road Watling Street, running from Wroxeter (Viroconium) to Leintwardine (Bravonium or Branogenium) - Iter XII of the Antonine Itinerary. An important route built in the 1st century AD, the stretch here has been in continuous use.

Originally a chapelry of Condover, the medieval church of St Mark was demolished and replaced with the present small Georgian church in 1809. Notable for its box pews, it is a Grade II listed building. A north aisle was added in 1859. The congregation has been declining for some years.

On the edge of Lodge Hill lies a curious old building, built in 1591, known as Frodesley Lodge, or the Stone House. At the northern end is a round tower containing a spiral stone staircase the whole height of the building, opening on to the leaded roof, which has extensive views. Apparently it was built as a hunting lodge by Edward Scriven (1549-1631). Generations of his Scriven ancestors dating back to Reginald Scriven, who died in 1428, were born and died in Frodesley, as did Edward's son, Sir Thomas Scriven (1584-1644). Formerly isolated, the oft renovated Lodge now lies among more recent barn conversion dwellings. Just down the hill from the Lodge is the venerable, 90% dead, Frodesley Oak, more than 700 years old.

Between 1922 and 2018 the village had its own water supply managed by the "Frodesley Water Committee". It was decommissioned because of irreparable corrosion to the pipes.

Until July 2006 there was a public house, the Swan. This has since been converted to a private dwelling.

== Notable residents ==
Sir Herbert Edwardes, the 19th century soldier-administrator in India, known as the "Hero of Multan", was born at Frodesley when his father was local Rector. The 19th century naturalist and entomologist Frederick William Hope, donor of Oxford University's Hope Collection of insect specimens, was briefly parish curate at Frodesley.

== See also ==
- Listed buildings in Frodesley
