= Acton Burnell Castle =

Manor house in Shropshire, England

- Shropshire, England
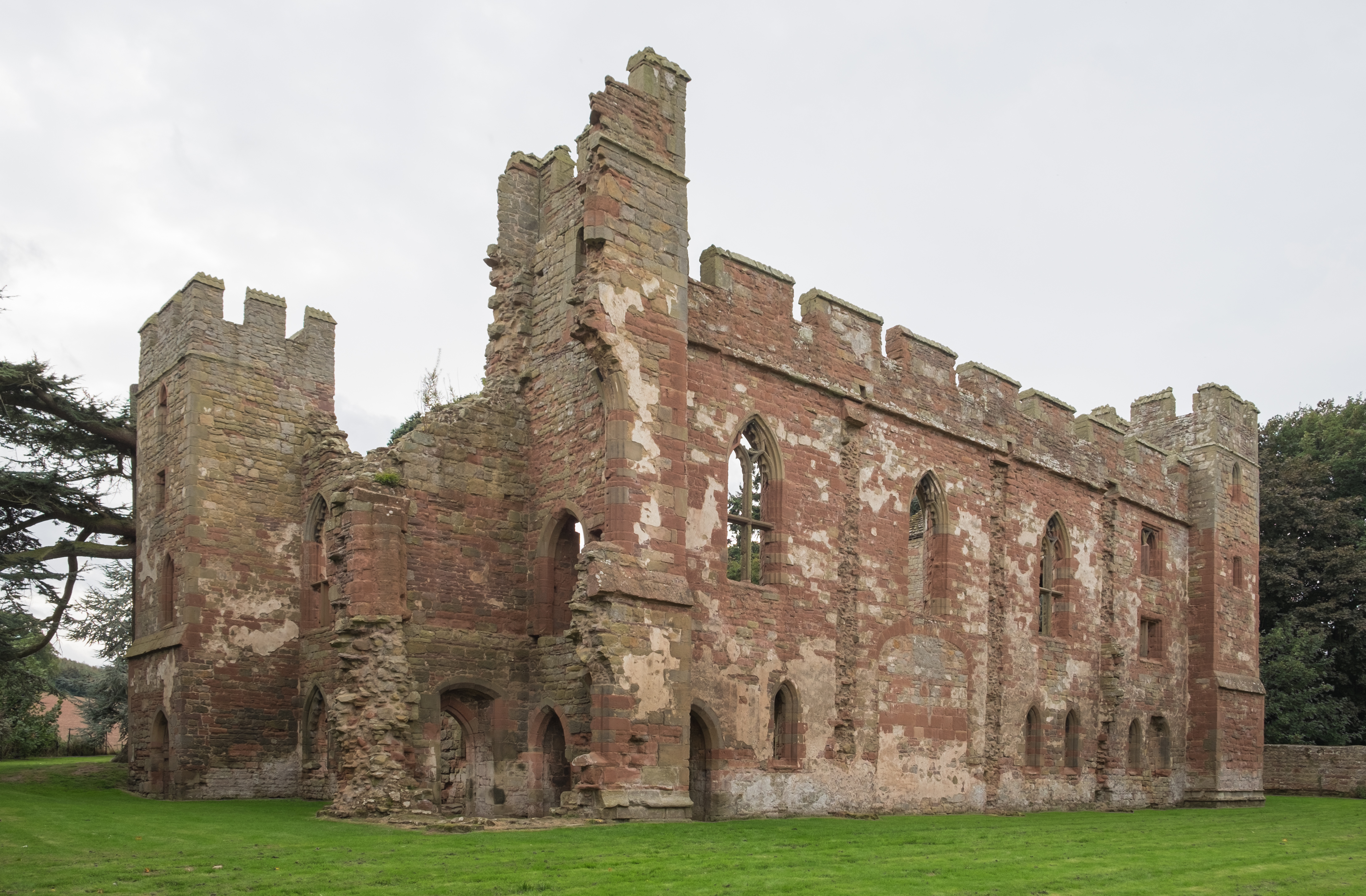
- Acton Burnell Castle in 2016

Site information
- Type: Fortified manor house
- Owner: English Heritage
- Open to the public: Yes
- Condition: Ruined

Location
- Shown within Shropshire.
- Coordinates: 52°36′46″N 2°41′23″W grid reference SJ534019

Acton Burnell Castle is a 13th-century fortified manor house, located near the village of Acton Burnell, Shropshire, England (grid reference SJ534019). It is believed that the first Parliament of England at which the Commons were fully represented was held here in 1283. Today all that remains is the outer shell of the manor house and the gable ends of the barn. It is a Grade I listed building on the Statutory List of Buildings of Special Architectural or Historic Interest.

== Initial building ==
The manor house was built in 1284 by Robert Burnell, Bishop of Bath and Wells, friend and advisor to King Edward I. Its position was important at the time because it was near the old Roman road of Watling Street. The extent of the estate is not known, as much of the building has been destroyed or remains undiscovered. It would have been substantial enough to accommodate Edward I and his retinue, soldiers and advisers, but was never an actual castle.

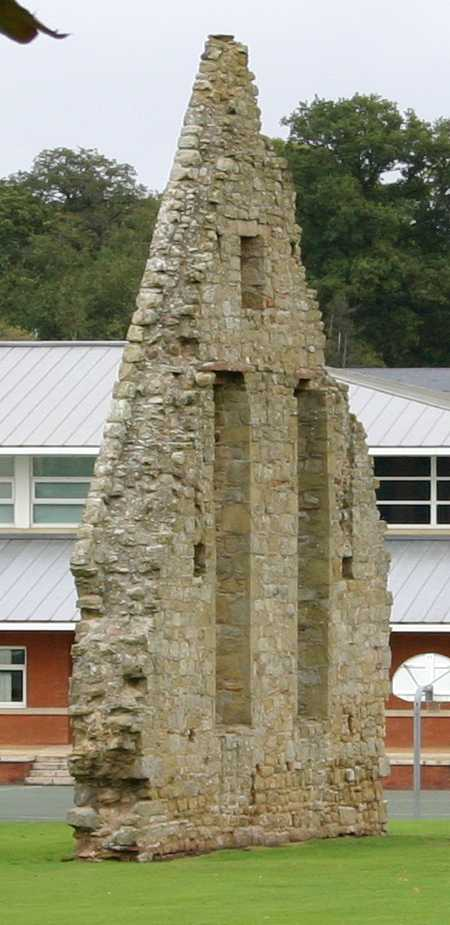
All that remains of the first Parliament building

Robert Burnell was granted a royal licence to crenellate and fortify the manor on 28 January 1284, a benefit only extended to trusted people. The building was rectangular with a tower at each corner. It was three storeys high consisting of a hall, solar, bedrooms, offices, chapel and kitchen. Robert Burnell also built the nearby Church of St Mary and the surrounding village.

Before this, in the autumn of 1283, Edward I had held a Parliament at Acton Burnell, presumably in the adjacent great barn, the only building large enough. It is significant in that it was the first time in English history that the law-making process included the Commons. The law passed became known as the Statute of Acton Burnell, a law giving protection to creditors, indicating the increasing significance of traders during those times.

== Subsequent owners ==
When Robert Burnell died in 1292, the estate was passed down through the family line, eventually becoming owned by the Lovels of Titchmarsh, Northamptonshire via a marriage. Following the Battle of Stoke Field in 1487, the land was confiscated by Henry VII, who in turn granted it to Thomas Howard, 2nd Duke of Norfolk. By the time it passed to the Smythe family in the mid-17th century, it had been mostly demolished.Today Acton Burnell Castle is maintained by English Heritage. All that remains open to the public is the shell of the former private residence, accessible via a footpath through a small wood.

== See also ==
- Grade I listed buildings in Shropshire
- Listed buildings in Acton Burnell
- Castles in Great Britain and Ireland
- List of castles in England
