= Acton Burnell =

Village in Shropshire, England

Coordinates: 52.614°N 2.695°W

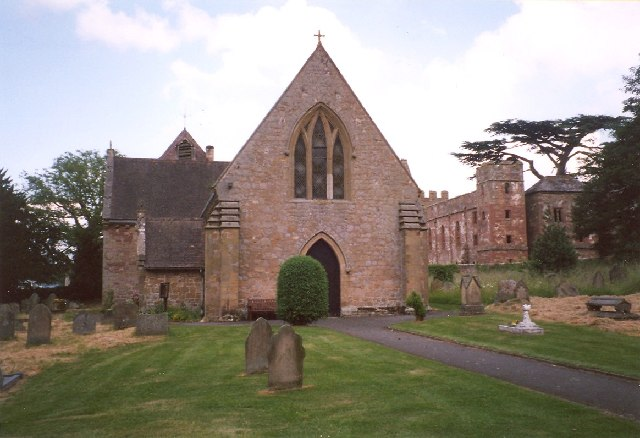
- St Mary's church and the 'castle', actually a fortified manor, at Acton Burnell.

- Location within Shropshire
- OS grid reference: SJ529020
- Civil parish: Acton Burnell
- Unitary authority: Shropshire
- Ceremonial county: Shropshire
- Region: West Midlands
- Country: England
- Sovereign state: United Kingdom
- Post town: SHREWSBURY
- Postcode district: SY5
- Dialling code: 01694
- Police: West Mercia
- Fire: Shropshire
- Ambulance: West Midlands
- UK Parliament: South Shropshire

Acton Burnell (/æktən bɜːrnəl/) is a village and parish in the English county of Shropshire. Home to Concord College, it is also famous for an early meeting of Parliament where the Statute of Acton Burnell was passed in 1283. The population at the 2011 census was 544.

The village today has a post office and Anglican parish church, as well as a Roman Catholic cemetery.

== History ==
Running to the north-west of the village is a Roman road, that ran between the modern day settlements of Wroxeter and Leintwardine.

The etymology of Acton Burnell is Old English āc (oak) and tūn (farm, estate), joined with the family name Burnell (thus meaning the part of Acton held by the Burnell family).

It was the birthplace of Robert Burnell, a thirteenth century prelate, politician and regent under Edward I.

For 20 years, as guests of Sir Edward Smythe a former pupil, the monks of Douai, following expulsion from France in the French Revolution, lived in community at Acton Burnell until they moved to Somerset, where they founded Downside Abbey, in 1814.

== Attractions ==
There are the remains of Acton Burnell Castle – not truly a castle but a fortified manor house – created by Robert Burnell and dating to the 13th century. Robert Burnell was the Bishop of Bath and Wells and Lord Chancellor to King Edward I. His family name was added to the placename Acton to give the village's name.

The entire village is designated as a conservation area.

Acton Burnell Hall is now inhabited by Concord College, an international college, in the grounds of which stand the remaining walls (gable ends) of the 'Parliament Barn' where the first English Parliament at which the Commons were adequately represented met in 1283. Previously the Parliament had met at Shrewsbury.

Approximately 1.5 miles (2.4 km) to the south of the village is Langley Chapel.

== St Mary's Church ==
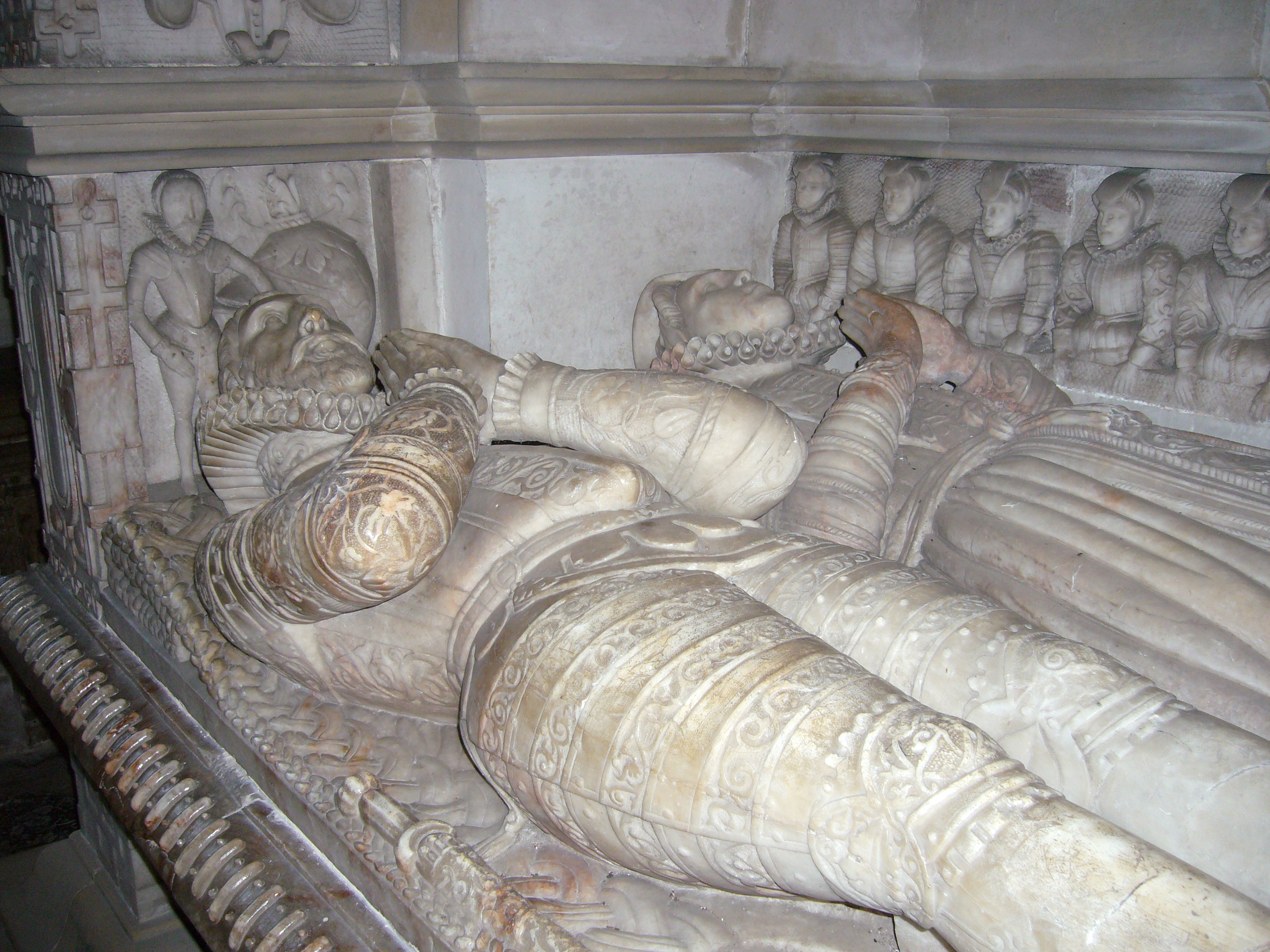
Elizabethan tomb of Sir Richard Lee (died 1591) and his wife in St Mary's Church, ancestors of Robert E. Lee.

Acton Burnell's parish church – St Mary's – was also built by Robert Burnell and dates from circa 1260, though additions were made to it during the 16th century. The church is situated approximately 50 yards from the Castle.

== Nearby villages ==
Nearby villages include Frodesley and Pitchford.

== See also ==
- Listed buildings in Acton Burnell
