= William Chillenden =

Archbishop-elect of Canterbury (died 1274)

- Archbishop-elect of Canterbury
- Elected: 9 September 1270
- Quashed: summer 1272
- Predecessor: Boniface of Savoy (archbishop)
- Successor: Robert Kilwardby (archbishop)
- Other post: Prior of Christ Church, Canterbury

Orders
- Consecration: (never consecrated)

Personal details
- Died: 13 September 1274

William Chillenden (died 1274), also known as Adam of Chillenden, was a monk at Christ Church Priory, Canterbury, and treasurer of that priory when he was elected Prior of Christ Church in 1263 (or 1264).

Chillenden was elected to be Archbishop of Canterbury in England on 9 September 1270. King Edward I, however, had wanted his Chancellor Robert Burnell elected. Chillenden's election was set aside by the pope in the summer of 1272 and he never received his pallium.

Chillenden died on 13 September 1274.

== Citations ==
Catholic Church titles
Preceded by Roger de St Elphege	Prior of Christ Church, Canterbury; 1263/4–1274	Succeeded by Thomas Ringmere
Preceded by Boniface of Savoy (archbishop)	Archbishop-elect of Canterbury; 1270–1272	Succeeded by Robert Kilwardby (archbishop)
