= Thomas Chillenden =

English monk (died 1411)

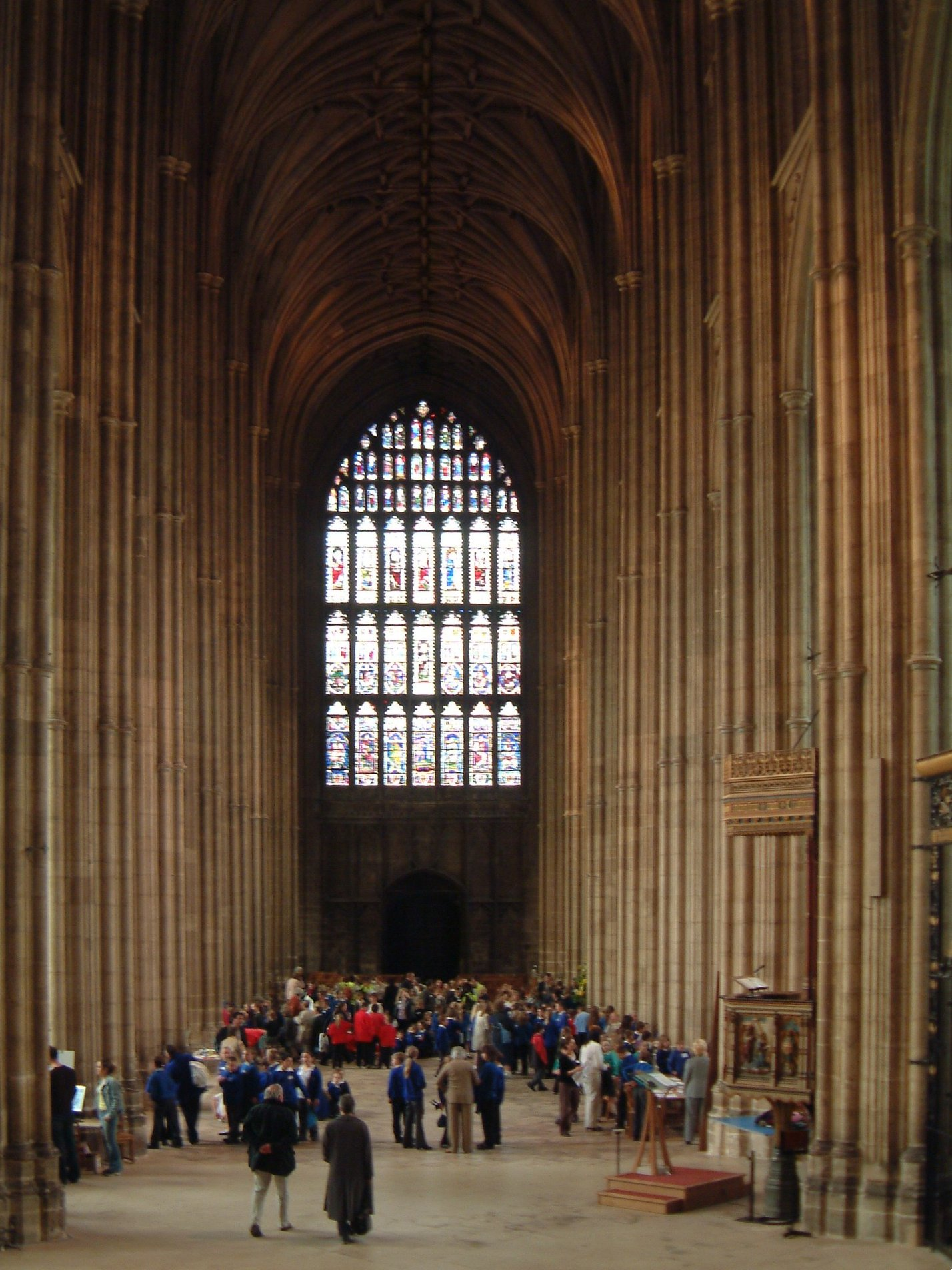
Chillenden's Perpendicular nave at Christ Church Priory (now Canterbury Cathedral)

Thomas Chillenden (died 15 August 1411) was Prior of Christ Church Priory, Canterbury from 1391 to 1410. Under him, from 1391 to 1400, the Cathedral-Priory church's nave was rebuilt in the Perpendicular style of English Gothic architecture.

== Life ==
=== Early life ===
His family (and hence its surname) probably originated in the Kentish village of Chillenden, though his parents are unknown. After becoming a monk at Christ Church Priory, he studied for a bachelor's in canon law at Canterbury College, Oxford, from 1365 to 1378, before going to Rome to study the same subject at the papal curia. There he became a Doctor of Canon Law, in 1383 or earlier, put together an index to the fourth book of the Decretals of Gregory IX (Repertorium quarti libri decretalium), wrote a commentary to the Regulae juris (Longleat, MS 35, fols. 187–206), and lectured on the fourth book of the Clementines (‘Reportata on the Clementines’). In 1383 the University of Oxford was involved in a dispute with St Frideswide's Priory, and Chillenden served as the former's proctor.

=== As prior ===
Chillenden's election as prior came after some time as one of the Priory's treasurers. As prior, Chillenden also tried to hold onto partial control of the monasteries' finances, subsuming his role of treasurer into his office of prior. All the monastery's income from, for example, its oblations and manors thus passed through his office, with him allocating a sufficient allowance to meet the expenditure of each obedientary (e.g. cellarer, sacrist). In addition, with the monastery - in the wake of the Black Death - veering between leasing out and directly managing its East Kent manors and leasing them out, he ceased direct management (then true of many, but not all, its manors). He reformed the leasing system, with rents being paid in fixed quantities of stock and grain rather than in money. However, he did not bring so sudden an end to the priory's estates being directly managed as RAL Smith maintains. While Chillenden was prior, twenty-four books on canon law and another eleven on civil law were added to the monastery library. One of these was probably the Repertorium sexti libri decretalium - it was previously attributed to Chillenden himself, but was actually written by a monk called John.

With this financial control, within a year of election Chillenden had restarted the rebuilding of the nave (paused since Simon Sudbury's murder in 1381). Chillenden also initiated a policy of investment and new construction by the priory. This occurred both in urban areas like Southwark, London (where it bought houses and shops previously belonging to a Robert Little, and built new ones) and Canterbury (creating new buildings in Burgate and Stourstreet, along with a huge new inn called The Chequers, and purchasing a new inn called The Crown), in the priory's rural manors (with new granaries, stables, fulling mills, watermills and barns being built, often with roof tiles, rare at this period), and in the priory itself (with the chapter house restored, a new 903 lb silver-gilt table-altar purchased, and the prior's chapel and residence - among other buildings - extensively improved). A century after Chillenden's death, he was called by John Leland "the greatest builder’ among the priors".

As the last prior of Canterbury to attend parliament, Chillenden was summoned to Richard II's 1399 council at Oxford to advise the king on the papal schism, and at another time appointed by Richard as a commissioner in the inquiry on goods belonging to merchants from Gueldres then resident in England. He represented both Christ Church Priory and the English crown at the 1409 Council of Pisa, though five years earlier [1405] he had refused to accept the role of bishop of Rochester, to which he had been elected.
