= Thomas Goldwell (prior) =

English priest

Thomas Goldwell was the last prior of Christ Church Priory, Canterbury before it was dissolved in the Dissolution of the Monasteries in March 1540, entering office in 1517. During his term of office he corresponded with Thomas Cromwell about Elizabeth Barton, the "Maid of Kent". In these letters, he reported that his then archbishop William Warham "gave much credence unto her words in such things as she knew and surmised to know, that she did show unto him".

He and 69 of his monks signed the acknowledgement of the royal supremacy on 10 December 1534 and from then until its Dissolution he kept the house generally obedient to the will of the king and Cromwell. In summer 1537 he received the king and Jane Seymour at St Augustine's Abbey on their summer progress to Canterbury and Dover. For his obedience to the Supremacy and for keeping his house obedient to the king, he was given a pension of £80 on 4 April 1539 along "with the office of one of the prebendaries [at the new Cathedral]" after the monastery's surrender by its archbishop in March 1539.

== Sources ==
- Victoria County History at British History Online
