= Robert Burnell =

English bishop, Lord Chancellor from 1274 to 1292

- Bishop of Bath and Wells
- Province: Canterbury
- Elected: 23 January 1275
- Term ended: 25 October 1292
- Predecessor: William of Bitton II
- Successor: William of March
- Other posts: Lord Chancellor, Archbishop-elect of Canterbury, Bishop-elect of Winchester

Orders
- Consecration: 7 April 1275 by Archbishop Robert Kilwardby, O.P.

Personal details
- Born: c. 1239 Acton Burnell, Shropshire, Kingdom of England
- Died: 25 October 1292 (age c. 53) Berwick-upon-Tweed, Northumberland, Kingdom of England
- Buried: Wells Cathedral
- Parents: Roger Burnell (probably)

Lord Chancellor
- In office 1274–1292
- Monarch: Edward I
- Preceded by: Walter de Merton
- Succeeded by: John Langton

Robert Burnell (sometimes spelled Robert Burnel; c. 1239 – 25 October 1292) was an English bishop who served as Lord Chancellor of England from 1274 to 1292. A native of Shropshire, he served as a minor royal official before entering into the service of Prince Edward, the future King Edward I. When Edward went on the Eighth Crusade in 1270, Burnell stayed in England to secure the prince's interests. He served as regent after the death of King Henry III of England while Edward was still on crusade. He was twice elected Archbishop of Canterbury, but his personal life—which included a long-term mistress who was rumoured to have borne him four sons—prevented his confirmation by the papacy. In 1275, Burnell was elected Bishop of Bath and Wells, after Edward had appointed him Lord Chancellor in 1274.

Burnell was behind the efforts of the royal officials to enforce royal rights during his term of office as chancellor, including the implementation of the Quo warranto procedures. He also helped with the legislative and legal reforms of Edward's reign. During Burnell's tenure, the chancellor's office and records became fixed in London rather than travelling with the king. Burnell went abroad on diplomatic missions for Edward, and for a time governed Gascony. He continued to enjoy the king's trust until his death in 1292; one historian has suggested that Burnell may have been the most important royal official of the 13th century.

== Early life ==
By 1198 Burnell's family had bestowed its name on Acton Burnell in Shropshire, where Burnell was born probably in about 1239, as he was close in age to King Edward. His father was probably Roger Burnell, who died in about 1259. He had three brothers, two of whom died fighting the Welsh at the Battle of Moel-y-don in 1282; the third, Hugh, died in 1286. Hugh's son Philip was Robert's eventual heir. Burnell worked as a clerk in the royal chancery, (Note: During this period, a clerk meant a man who was a member of the secular clergy.) the office responsible for the writing of documents, before moving to the household of Prince Edward, later King Edward I of England. By 1257 Burnell was spending most of his time with the prince and the prince's household. After Simon de Montfort's victory at the Battle of Lewes in 1264, Burnell continued to serve Edward, and was named the prince's clerk in December 1264. As a reward for his service, Burnell was given the prebend of Holme in the diocese of York some time before 1267, and was named Archdeacon of York in December 1270. He also held the office of chancellor to Edward from the time of the Battle of Evesham in 1265 until 1270, when Edward left on crusade.

Prince Edward tried to have Burnell elected to the Archbishopric of Canterbury in 1270, but was frustrated by the Canterbury cathedral chapter's members, who instead elected their prior, William Chillenden. Eventually, Pope Gregory X set Chillenden aside and installed his own choice in the see, Robert Kilwardby. Burnell did not accompany the prince on the crusade in late 1270, although he had originally planned to do so. Instead, he was appointed one of the four lieutenants who looked after Edward's interests while the prince was away. (Note: Exactly what happened and when in August 1270 is confused, and as this is the time when Burnell was put forward for Canterbury as well as when he planned to accompany Edward on crusade, the exact reasons why this change happened thus remain a matter of guesswork. The historian Richard Huscroft explored the issues in an article in 2001.) Thus, he was still in England when Henry III died in November 1272. Burnell acted as one of the regents of the kingdom until August 1274, when the prince, now king, returned from Palestine. During the regency, Burnell supervised a parliament, dealt with raids on the Welsh Marches and resolved a trade conflict with Flanders. After the king's return to England, Burnell was made chancellor. The historian Richard Huscroft considers that Burnell gained valuable experience governing England during Edward's absence, ensuring Burnell's dominance in the English government after Edward's return.

== Chancellor and bishop ==
On 23 January 1275, Burnell was elected to the see of Bath and Wells. He received the temporalities of the see on 19 March 1275 and was consecrated on 7 April 1275. Three years later Edward once more tried to secure the see of Canterbury for his favourite. Burnell was elected to the archbishopric in June or July 1278, but the election was quashed by Pope Nicholas III in January 1279. King Edward sent a deputation, including the eventual appointee, John Peckham, to secure Nicholas' confirmation of the election. The pope named three cardinals as investigators, and then appointed Peckham instead. The bishop's second failure to obtain the archbishopric was probably a consequence of his lifestyle, which included keeping a mistress. Edward made one final attempt to promote his friend to a wealthier see in early 1280, when Burnell was nominated to become Bishop of Winchester, but Pope Nicholas III quashed the election on 28 June 1280.

Burnell was the chief and most influential of Edward I's advisers during the first half of his reign. As part of his duties, Burnell spent most of his time in attendance on the king. He heard many requests and petitions from those who desired patronage or other advancements, and was diligent and active in dealing with routine business. Burnell played a leading role in the legislation introduced by King Edward. The king's major legislative acts mainly date to Burnell's tenure of the office of chancellor, from 21 September 1274 until Burnell's death in 1292. Burnell was instrumental in the enforcement of royal writs and enactments, including the Statutes of Westminster, enacted in 1275, 1285, and 1290. Those of 1275 attempted to deal with the usurpation of royal rights. Keeping the peace in the realm and the extension of royal jurisdiction to cover rape was dealt with in the statutes from 1285, along with a number of other issues. The last statute, from 1290, regulated land law, the result of pressure from the magnates, the leading laymen of England.

During Burnell's time in office, Edward and his royal officials made great efforts to reassert royal rights that were felt to have been usurped by the king's subjects. These efforts were made under writs of Quo warranto, (Note: Latin for "by what warrant?") which asked the recipient what royal grant or warrant gives the recipient the authority to exercise a right or a power. They were first issued in 1278, after earlier attempts to recover royal rights through parliament unintentionally resulted in too much work for that body. Through these writs, attempts were made to enforce the rule that the only correct way to receive a privilege or grant of land was through a written charter, which might have deprived most of the magnates of England of their lands and rights. Most lands at that time were held not by documentary grants, but by the force of custom. By the 1290s, the government was forced to back down and permit rights as they had been allowed from "time out of mind".

The distinction between the king's personal household department of the Wardrobe and the governmental department of the Chancery, which was headed by the chancellor, disappeared almost entirely during Burnell's period of office. The Wardrobe had developed as a less formal department for the collection and distribution of money, but under Edward had effectively become a treasury for warfare. There was no rivalry between the holders of the Great Seal, the official seal of government and used for formal documents, and the Privy Seal, used to authenticate the king's less formal letters. During Burnell's time in office, the king only used a Privy Seal warrant, or an informal set of instructions for the chancellor to issue a letter from the Chancery under the Great Seal, when the king and Burnell were apart; after Burnell's death, the number of Privy Seal warrants increased greatly. (Note: The Privy Seal at this time was held by the controller of the Wardrobe, who was Philip Willoughby from the accession until 18 October 1274 then Thomas Bek, (later Bishop St David's) until 20 November 1280, then William Louth (later Bishop of Ely) until 12 May 1290, then Walter Langton, acting controller from 12 May 1290, and then appointed to office on 20 November 1290 until 1295.)

Edward had such trust in his chancellor and the chancellor's clerks that Burnell and the clerks were allowed to dispense with the hanaper system, which required fees for sealing charters to be paid into the hanaper department of the Chancery for disbursal. Robert and his clerks were permitted to enjoy the profits from the fees of their office. Burnell was also responsible for the decision to force the Court of Chancery to settle in London, rather than following the king and his court around the country. A Chancery memorandum of 1280 records that the chancellor, along with the other ministers, now had the duty of sorting the many petitions that came into the government and only passing on the most urgent to the king.

As bishop, Burnell had a wall built around the cathedral at Wells, which helped to improve the security of the cathedral and its outlying buildings. He left the court each year at Lent, when he returned to his diocese and attended to its affairs. Peckham appointed Burnell to be his deputy when the archbishop went to Wales in 1282. It was probably Burnell who suggested a compromise in 1285 over the jurisdictions of the royal and ecclesiastical courts, which allowed royal officials to return cases involving only religious matters to the church courts.

== Foreign service ==
Burnell was active in the king's foreign policy, especially towards France, Scotland, and Wales, and undertook a number of diplomatic missions to those countries. Burnell served as the royal spokesman on several of these occasions, one of them being at Paris in 1286 when he made a speech detailing the history of English–French relations since the Treaty of Paris of 1259. The speech was a prelude to discussions, successfully concluded, involving the homage that Edward owed to King Philip IV of France, for Edward's land in France. Burnell was employed in Gascony during the late 1280s, helping to administer that duchy and to reorganise its government. He showed himself sensitive to the Gascon desire for independence and did not attempt to impose the same systems of government that were used in England. The historian Michael Prestwich therefore argues that the first half of Edward's reign was the period when Gascony enjoyed its most successful government under the Plantagenets. Later, in June 1291, Burnell gave two speeches at the great council of English and Scottish nobles in Norham to decide the succession to the Scottish crown. Edward had been asked to mediate an end to the crisis over the succession, or the Great Cause as it was known in England.

In Welsh affairs, Burnell attended a number of councils dealing with Llywelyn ap Gruffudd, Prince of Wales, and in 1277 he escorted Llywelyn to Westminster, where Llywelyn pledged homage to Edward. Burnell was present during Edward's conquest of Wales in the 1280s; he witnessed documents in Rhuddlan in 1282, and subsequently at Conwy and Caernarfon.

Sometime before 1290, Burnell vowed to go on crusade to help reinforce the crusader city of Acre, which was threatened by Muslims in the late 1280s, but he never fulfilled his obligation.

== Death and legacy ==
Burnell died in Berwick, on 25 October 1292. His body, without his heart, is interred in the nave of Wells Cathedral; his heart was buried at Bath Abbey. Although he was usually busy with royal business, Burnell managed to expand his bishopric and provide for his relatives. He amassed great wealth, and acquired numerous estates in Shropshire, Worcestershire, Somerset, Kent, Surrey and elsewhere. At his death, he owned 82 manors over 19 counties, most of them his personal property rather than that of the diocese of Bath and Wells.

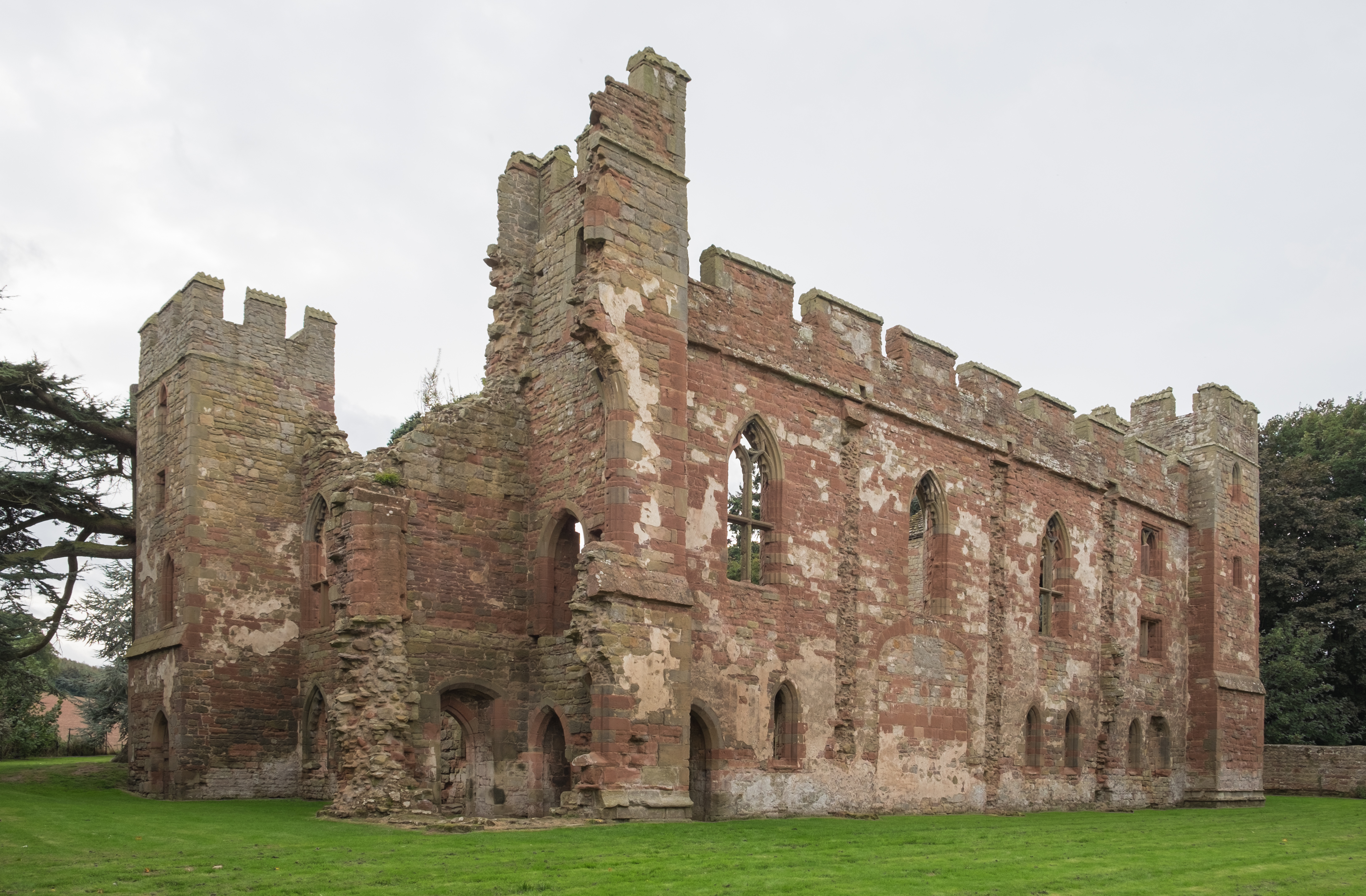
Ruins of the house built by Burnell at Acton Burnell

Even after he became a bishop Burnell kept a mistress, Juliana. Rumours circulated that they had four sons, and that he had a number of daughters, all of which Burnell denied. He kept a magnificent household, sufficient for him to be able to host a parliament at his home in Acton Burnell in autumn 1283. He married off a number of young female relatives, rumoured to be his daughters, to noblemen. Amabilla Burnell married a member of a royal justice's family, and a Joan Burnell was the subject of a guarantee to the bishop that the son of William of Greystoke would marry her. A William Burnell was dean of Wells Cathedral, and was named as one of the bishop's executors. Robert Burnell's eventual heir was his nephew, Philip.

Burnell built extensively at Acton Burnell Castle, and large parts of his house have survived. It was substantially different in plan from the older hall-style houses, which had the private quarters at the back of a large hall. At Acton Burnell the bishop's quarters were well away from the building's main public spaces, and included a latrine. The house was not quite a castle, but it was designed to have some defensive capability. The overall form of the structure was of a fortified hall-house, much like the Norman-era hall-keeps. He also built the chapel and great hall in the Bishop's Palace in Wells.

Burnell was a dominant figure during the first part of Edward's reign, and he controlled most aspects of royal administration. He was involved not only in domestic issues but also in foreign relations, a responsibility he retained for two decades after Edward's return to England in 1274. Huscroft argues that he may have been the most important royal administrator of the 13th century.

== Citations ==
Political offices
Preceded by Walter de Merton	Lord Chancellor; 1274–1292	Succeeded by John Langton
Catholic Church titles
Preceded by William of Bitton II	Bishop of Bath and Wells; 1275–1292	Succeeded by William of March
Preceded by Robert Kilwardby as consecrated archbishop	Archbishop-elect of Canterbury; 1278–1279	Succeeded by John Peckham as consecrated archbishop
Preceded by Nicholas of Ely as consecrated bishop	Bishop-elect of Winchester; 1280	Succeeded by Richard de la More
