= Easton Court railway station =

Former railway station in Herefordshire, England

Easton Court

General information
- Location: Little Hereford, Herefordshire; England
- Coordinates: 52.3090°N 2.6537°W
- Grid reference: SO555680
- Platforms: 1

Other information
- Status: Disused

History
- Original company: Tenbury Railway
- Pre-grouping: Great Western Railway
- Post-grouping: Great Western Railway

Key dates
- 1861: Opened
- 1862: Closed
- 1865: Reopened
- 1961: Closed
Location

Easton Court railway station was a station in Little Hereford, Herefordshire, England. The station opened on 1 August 1861 as the only intermediate stop on the Tenbury Railway. It was removed from the passenger timetable in October 1862 due to a lack of traffic. Following the opening of the Tenbury and Bewdley Railway on 13 August 1864, which completed the line from Woofferton to Bewdley, Easton Court re-opened in April 1865.

The station appeared in some timetables as "Easton Court for Little Hereford". It closed on 31 July 1961, the same date as the closure of the former Tenbury Railway.

Preceding station	Disused railways	Following station
Woofferton; Line closed, station closed	Great Western Railway; Tenbury Railway	Tenbury Wells; Line and station closed
