= Tenbury Wells railway station =

Former railway station in Shropshire, England

Tenbury Wells
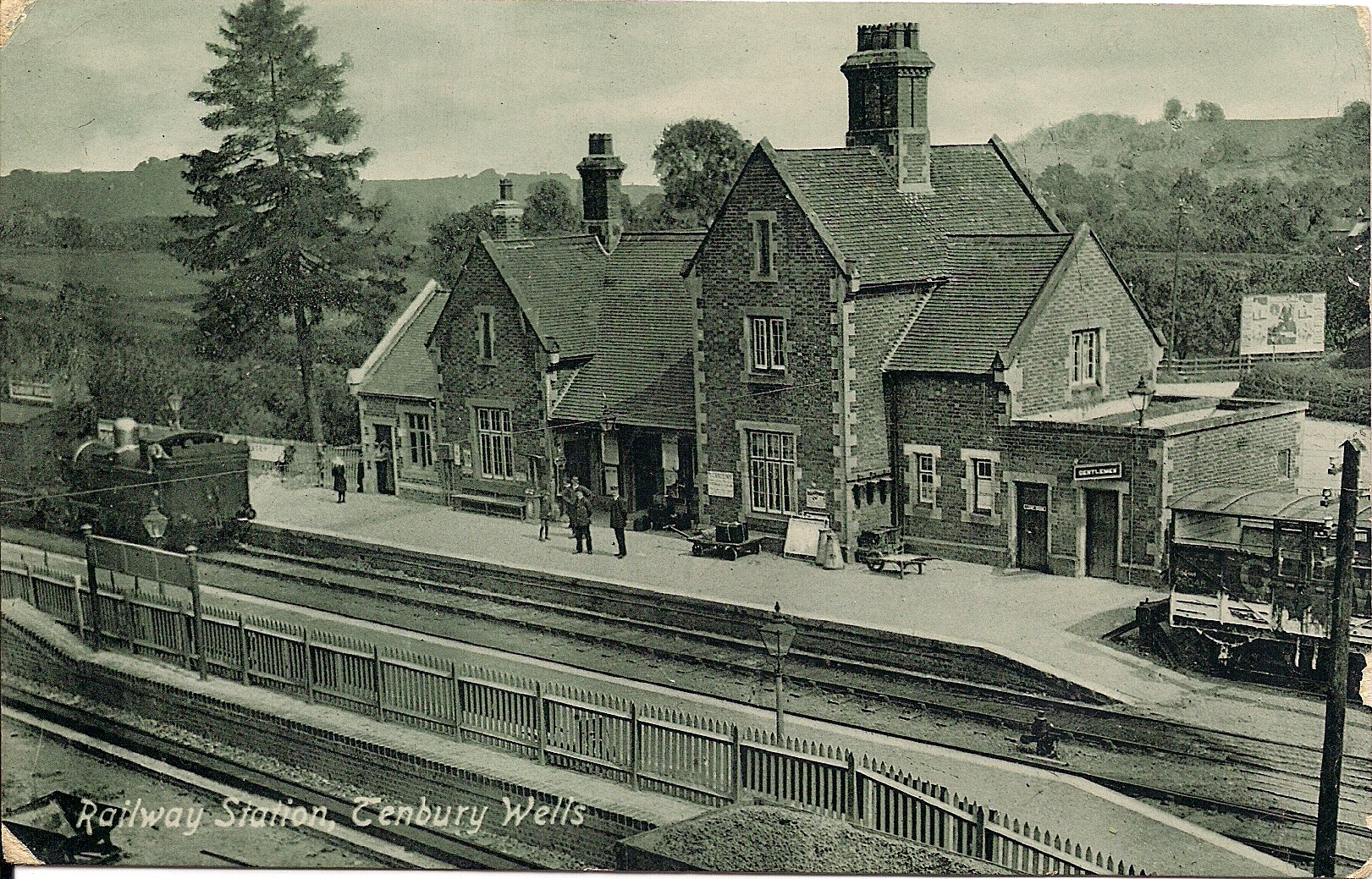
- Old postcard of Tenbury Wells station

General information
- Location: Burford, Shropshire; England
- Coordinates: 52.3176°N 2.6003°W
- Grid reference: SO592689
- Platforms: 2

Other information
- Status: Disused

History
- Original company: Tenbury Railway
- Pre-grouping: Great Western Railway
- Post-grouping: Great Western Railway

Key dates
- 1861: Opened as Tenbury
- 1912: Renamed Tenbury Wells
- 1962: Closed to passengers
- 1964: closed completely
Location

Tenbury Wells railway station was a stop on the Tenbury Railway in Burford, Shropshire, England; it also served the town of Tenbury Wells, across the River Teme in Worcestershire. The station was opened in 1861 and closed in 1962.

== History ==
The station was named Tenbury at opening on 1 August 1861. It originally formed the eastern terminus of the Tenbury Railway, a five-mile branch from Woofferton; it became a through station in August 1864 with the opening of the Tenbury and Bewdley Railway, which completed the line to Bewdley.

The station was renamed Tenbury Wells on 14 November 1912. The former Tenbury Railway closed on 31 July 1961, but Tenbury Wells station remained in use for passenger traffic to Bewdley until 1 August 1962. The station was served by goods trains until 1964, when the station was closed completely.

Preceding station	Disused railways	Following station
Easton Court; Line and station closed	Great Western Railway; Tenbury Railway	Newnham Bridge; Line and station closed

== The site today ==
Tenbury station was demolished and factory units were built on its site; Wells Soft Drinks Ltd occupied the site before being sold to the Kerry Group.
