= Newnham Bridge =

Village in Worcestershire, England

Coordinates: 52.322039°N 2.525817°W

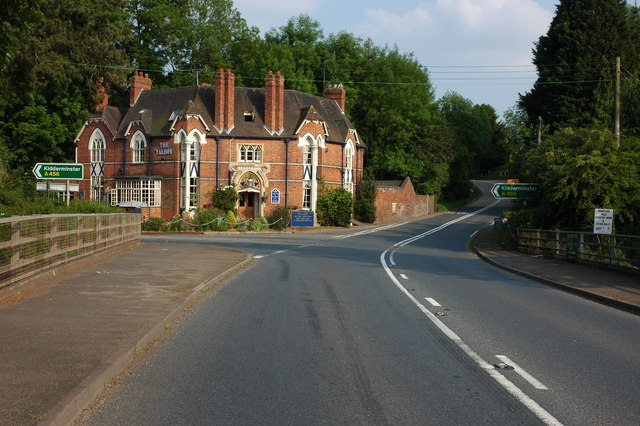
- The Talbot Inn, Newnham Bridge

- Location within Worcestershire
- OS grid reference: SO642694
- Civil parish: Knighton on Teme
- District: Malvern Hills
- Shire county: Worcestershire
- Region: West Midlands
- Country: England
- Sovereign state: United Kingdom
- Post town: TENBURY WELLS
- Postcode district: WR15
- Police: West Mercia
- Fire: Hereford and Worcester
- Ambulance: West Midlands

Newnham Bridge is a village in the parish of Knighton on Teme, near Tenbury Wells, in the Malvern Hills District of Worcestershire, England.

The village derives part of its name from the bridge over the River Rea.

== Location ==
Newnham Bridge is situated on the A443 road and the junction of the A456 road between Tenbury Wells and Great Witley, in the valley of the River Teme.

== History and amenities ==
The village formerly had a railway station, designed by William Clarke, on the Tenbury Line from Bewdley to Woofferton Junction. After the railway closed in the 1960s the station became a garden centre. This has now closed, but the platforms and buildings are still in place. The neighbouring station yard was recently developed as a housing estate and the station site has been bought by a housing association. The name of the station was Newnham Bridge rather than Newnham to avoid confusion with Newnham, Gloucestershire, which also had a GWR station; previously the village was known as Newnham and some maps still show it as such.

The Talbot Inn closed in 2009 but reopened in 2012 after a year-long refurbishment.

The former Railway Tavern Inn, closed in the late 20th century and was almost completely demolished during the second decade of the millennium to be replaced with a development of detached houses along Tavern Lane.

== Flooding ==
Located to the east of the confluence of the River Rea, Shropshire and River Teme, Newnham Bridge has appeared on the news during various flood events during which the River Rea overtops its banks. Despite widespread media attention the village itself is less affected by floods than is through traffic, given that the A456 on which the village sits is one of few major routes west from Birmingham.

During the widespread floods caused by Storm Dennis and Storm Ciara in February 2020, Yvonne Booth of Birmingham was swept away at the Eastham Bridge to the south of Newnham Bridge, when the vehicle she was travelling became stranded. Booth and the driver made it to the bridge but were swept away as they tried to traverse the swollen River Teme towards Eastham. The driver of the car was rescued by emergency services shortly after they entered the water, however Booth's body was recovered downstream at Woodston near Lindridge Church several days later.
