= Ashford Bowdler railway station =

Disused railway station in Shropshire, England

Ashford Bowdler
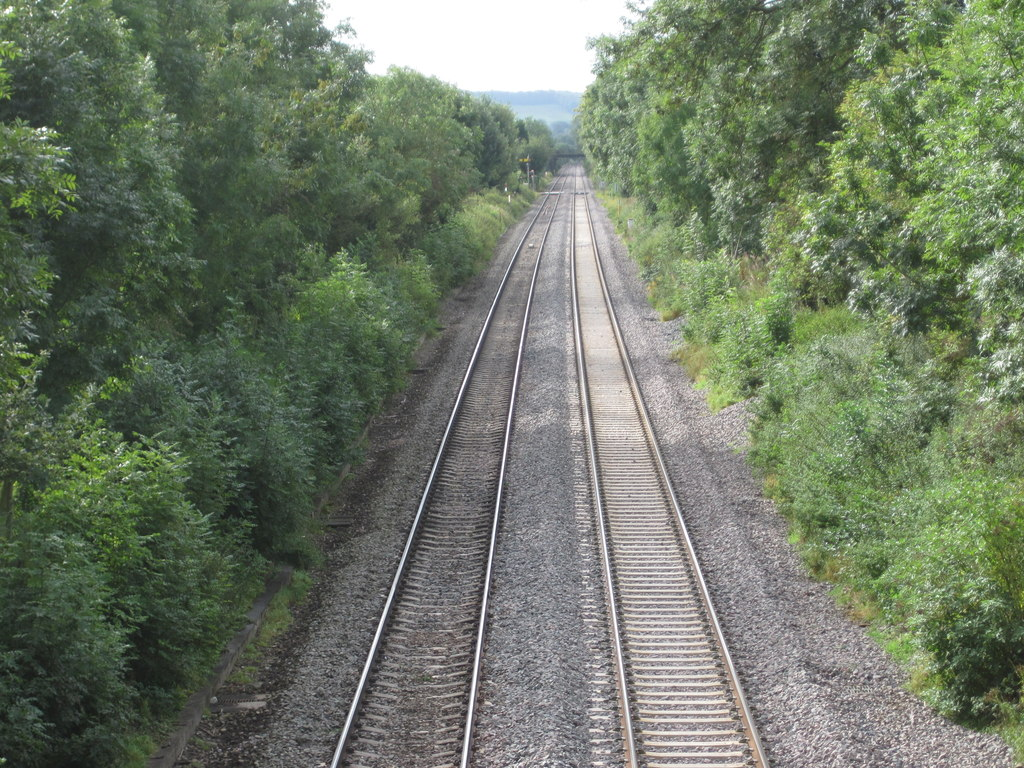
- The site of the station in 2012

General information
- Location: Ashford Bowdler, Shropshire; England
- Coordinates: 52.331°N 2.708°W
- Grid reference: SO518706

Other information
- Status: Disused

History
- Original company: Shrewsbury and Hereford Railway

Key dates
- 1854: Opened
- 1855: Closed
Location

Ashford Bowdler railway station was a station in Ashford Bowdler, Shropshire, England. The station was opened in 1854 and closed in 1855.

The station was a mile from Ashford Carbonel. It was two miles from Ludlow and less than two miles from Wooferton, both of which were bigger towns and had train stations.

As of 2025, the closest train station is Ludlow railway station.

Preceding station	Disused railways	Following station
Ludlow; Line and station open	LNWR and GWR joint Shrewsbury and Hereford Railway	Woofferton; Line open, station closed
