= Woofferton railway station =

Former railway station in Shropshire, England

Woofferton
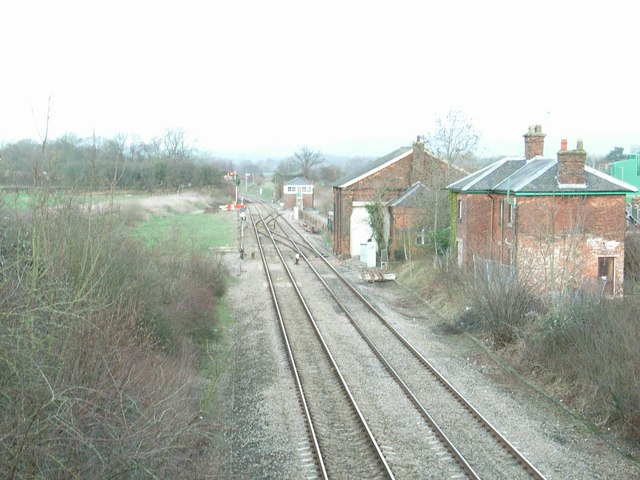
- Woofferton station (disused). The junction was just beyond the station, to the right

General information
- Location: Woofferton, Shropshire; England
- Coordinates: 52.3111°N 2.7136°W
- Grid reference: SO514683
- Platforms: 3

Other information
- Status: Disused

History
- Original company: Shrewsbury and Hereford Railway
- Pre-grouping: Shrewsbury and Hereford Railway
- Post-grouping: Shrewsbury and Hereford Railway

Key dates
- 6 December 1853: Station opened
- 31 July 1961: Station closed
Location

Woofferton was a railway station and junction near Woofferton, Shropshire, England. It was where the Tenbury Railway joined the Shrewsbury and Hereford Railway (S&HR).

== History ==
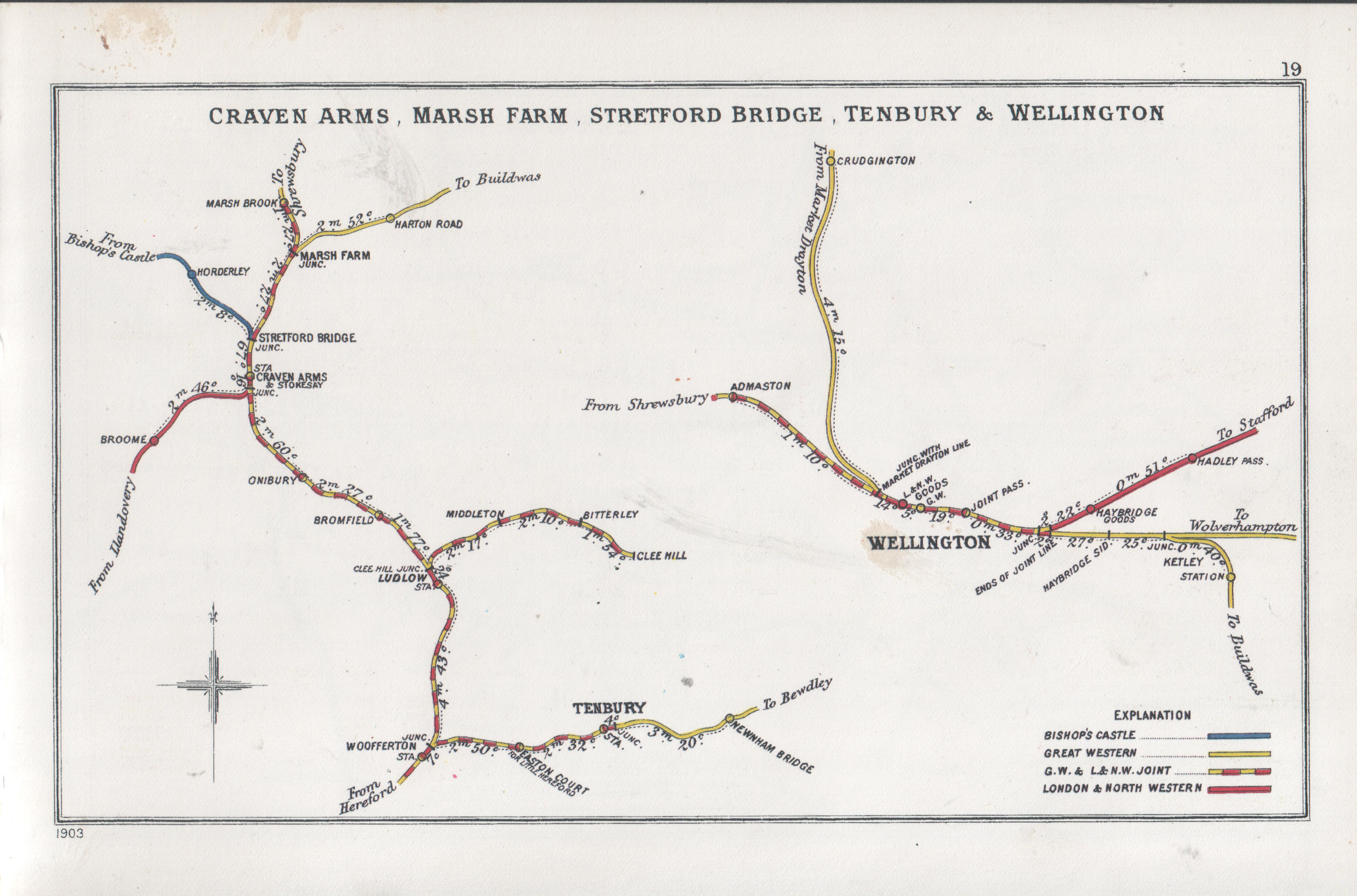
A Railway Clearing House junction diagram of 1903; Woofferton Junction is to the bottom left

The station opened on 6 December 1853, as part of the southern extension of the S&HR from Ludlow to Hereford. It became a junction station in August 1861, when the Tenbury Railway (operated by the S&HR) opened a five-mile branch line. to Tenbury, operated by the GWR. Then on 13th August 1864, the Great Western Railway-operated Tenbury and Bewdley Railway opened, completing the Wyre Forest Line to Bewdley. In 1889, a bay platform, known as the Back Platform, was added to serve the Wyre Forest Line; this was accessed via two diamond crossings in the main lines and continued in use until being removed in 1957.

The station closed on 31st July 1961, the same date as the closure of the former Tenbury Railway. The platforms were subsequently demolished although some buildings remain.

Preceding station	Historical railways	Following station
Berrington and Eye; Line open, station closed	Shrewsbury and Hereford Railway; Welsh Marches Line	Ashford Bowdler; Line open, station closed
	Disused railways	
Terminus	Shrewsbury and Hereford Railway; Tenbury Railway	Easton Court; Line and station closed

== The site today ==
The line through the station, the Welsh Marches Line, remains in use.
