= Newnham Bridge railway station =

Former railway station in Worcestershire, England

Newnham Bridge
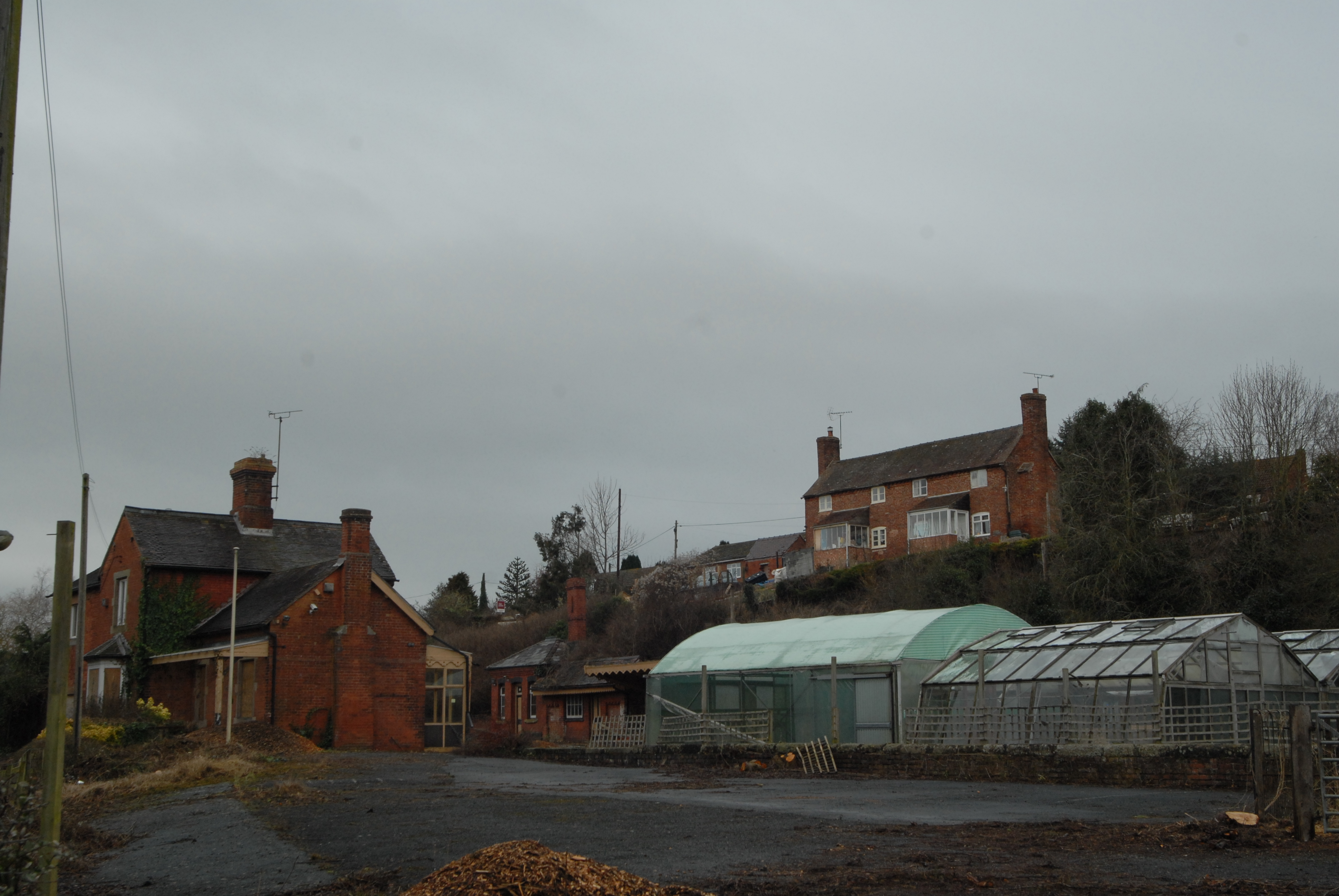
- The site of the station in 2015

General information
- Location: Newnham Bridge, Worcestershire; England
- Coordinates: 52.3209°N 2.5281°W
- Grid reference: SO641693
- Platforms: 1

Other information
- Status: Disused

History
- Original company: Tenbury and Bewdley Railway
- Pre-grouping: West Midland Railway
- Post-grouping: Great Western Railway

Key dates
- 1864: Opened
- 1873: Renamed 'Newnham Bridge'
- 1962: Closed
Location

Newnham Bridge railway station was a station on the Tenbury and Bewdley Railway in Newnham Bridge, Worcestershire, England. The station was named 'Newnham' when it opened on 13 August 1864, being renamed 'Newnham Bridge' in May 1873. It closed on 1 August 1962.

Unusually, the main station building was at rail level. From there, passengers used a foot crossing over the passing loop and running line to reach the single platform.

== Modern use ==
The station building, opposite platform canopy, platform and waiting shelter survive. The station was used as a garden centre for many years before falling to disuse. After a few years of abandonment, it is now a residence. The up yard and much of the adjacent line was turned into a housing estate.

Preceding station	Disused railways	Following station
Tenbury Wells; Line and station closed	Great Western Railway; Tenbury and Bewdley Railway	Neen Sollars; Line and station closed
