= Neen Sollars railway station =

Former railway station in Shropshire, England

Neen Sollars
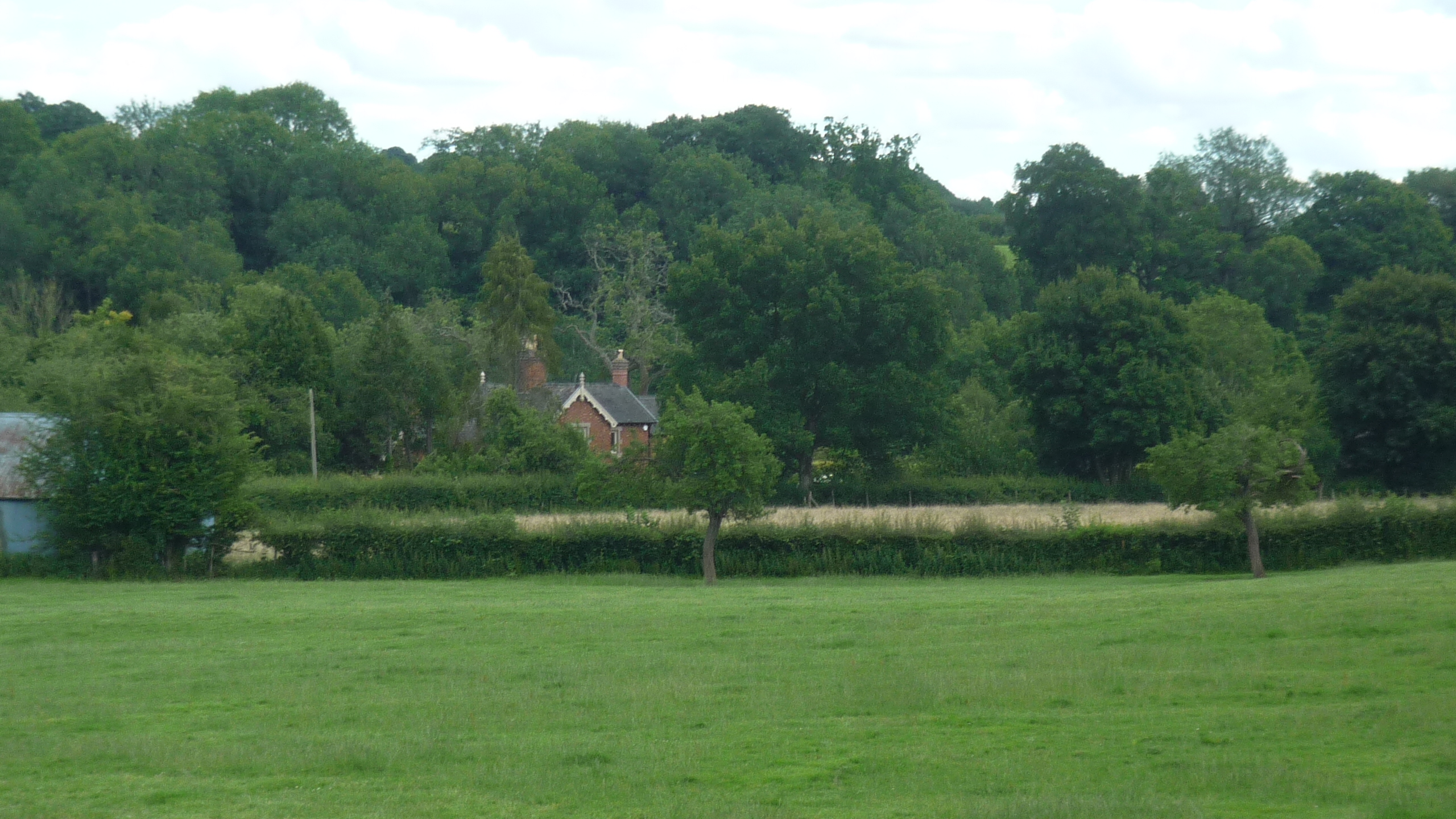
- Neen Sollars railway station viewed from the closest publicly accessible point. Its distinctive wood detailing can be seen

General information
- Location: Neen Sollars, Shropshire; England
- Coordinates: 52.3452°N 2.4978°W
- Grid reference: SO660720
- Platforms: 2

Other information
- Status: Disused

History
- Original company: Tenbury and Bewdley Railway
- Pre-grouping: Great Western Railway
- Post-grouping: Great Western Railway

Key dates
- 1864: Opened
- 1962: Closed
Location

Neen Sollars railway station was a station on the Tenbury & Bewdley railway in Neen Sollars, Shropshire, England. The station opened on 13 August 1864. A second staggered platform was opened in 1878, reached via a board crossing. This platform was taken out of use on 22 August 1954, the same date on which the station's signal box closed. The station became unstaffed in July 1961 and closed for passenger use on 1 August 1962, although goods traffic continued until January 1964.

The station building survives, in the intervening years between closure and the present day, much of its distinctive character had been lost as a result of many of its original 1864 William Clarke architectural features having been removed, however, it has been restored faithfully to its original state and now once again appears as a GWR railway station.

Preceding station	Disused railways	Following station
Newnham Bridge; Line and station closed	Great Western Railway; Tenbury and Bewdley Railway	Cleobury Mortimer; Line and station closed
