= Listed buildings in Richard's Castle (Shropshire) =

Richard's Castle (Shropshire) is a civil parish in Shropshire, England. It contains 30 listed buildings that are recorded in the National Heritage List for England. Of these, one is listed at Grade I, the highest of the three grades, two are at Grade II*, the middle grade, and the others are at Grade II, the lowest grade. The parish lies to the northeast of the village of Richard's Castle. It contains the villages of Overton and Woofferton and smaller settlements, and is otherwise rural. Most of the listed buildings in the parish are houses, cottages, farmhouses and farm buildings, the earliest of which are timber framed. There are two country houses that are listed, together with associated structures. The other listed buildings include a public house, an aqueduct, a bridge, a former toll house, two mileposts, and a church.

== Key ==
| Grade | Criteria |
|---|---|
| I | Buildings of exceptional interest, sometimes considered to be internationally important |
| II* | Particularly important buildings of more than special interest |
| II | Buildings of national importance and special interest |

== Buildings ==
| Name and location | Photograph | Date | Notes | Grade |
|---|---|---|---|---|
| Barn north of Woofferton Court Farmhouse; 52.31386°N 2.70446°W | — | Mid to late 15th century | The barn is timber framed with weatherboarding on a stone plinth, and has a tile roof. There are three bays, and a single-bay extension to the north. The barn contains double opposing doors, and another doorway to the west. | II |
| The Barracks and The Barracks Cottage; 52.31486°N 2.70688°W | — | 16th century | A house that was extended in the 18th and 19th centuries, restored in 1993, and divided into two dwellings. The early part is timber framed with rendered infill on a stone plinth, the later parts are in painted brick, and the roofs are tiled. The building consists of a five-bay range, a cross-wing at the south, and an extension to the east. There is a lean-to porch, the windows are casements, and in the cross-wing are two gabled dormers. | II |
| 16 and 17 Overton; 52.34364°N 2.72840°W | — | Late 16th century | A pair of houses that were extended in the 18th century and remodelled in the 19th century. They are timber framed on a plinth, the alterations are in brick and concrete, and the roofs are tiled. There are two storeys and four bays. On the front are four two-storey oriel windows on moulded brackets with flanking pilasters. The other windows are casements, and there are gabled half-dormers. | II |
| Pool House; 52.32310°N 2.74104°W | — | Late 16th century | The house was later altered and extended. The early part is timber framed with rendered infill on a stone plinth, the later parts are in stone, and the roof is tiled. There are two storeys, and the upper floor is jettied with a bressumer. There is a gabled porch, and bay windows, and the other windows are casements. | II |
| Batchcott Farmhouse; 52.33534°N 2.74695°W | — | 17th century | The farmhouse was later extended. The original part is timber framed on a stone plinth, the later parts are in stone, and the roof is tiled. There is a single storey and an attic, a two-bay range, a later cross-wing, and single-storey service wings. The windows are casements, and there are gabled eaves half-dormers. | II |
| Farm buildings, Hucksbarn Farm; 52.35292°N 2.72362°W | — | 17th century | The farm buildings were built between the 17th and the 20th centuries, and form three ranges around a courtyard. They consist of stables with a hayloft, a cowhouse with a dovecote, barns, a cowhouse, a shelter shed, and a granary. The earlier buildings are timber framed with weatherboarding, and the later buildings are in stone or brick. The roofs are tiled. | II |
| Woodcroft; 52.33758°N 2.74440°W | — | 17th century | The house was extended in the 18th century. The original part is timber framed with plaster infill on a plinth of stone and concrete, the later parts are in brick, and the roof is tiled. There are two storeys and three bays. In the centre is a gabled porch, and the windows are casements. | II |
| Mitnell Farmhouse; 52.32729°N 2.73563°W | — | 1674 | The farmhouse, later a private house, was extended in the 20th century. It is in stone with a tile roof, and has four bays, and a single-storey extension to the right. On the front is a gabled open porch, the windows on the front are casements, and at the rear they are mullioned. | II |
| Moor Park; 52.33829°N 2.73349°W | | Early 18th century | A country house, later a school, it was extensively remodelled in 1874–76, and is in Queen Anne style. It is built in brick and terracotta with facing in red stone, and has giant Doric pilasters, modillion eaves, and hipped tile roofs with shaped gables and ball finials. There are two storeys and attics, and a front of 13 bays. The central porch has round-headed openings, a Doric entablature, a balustrade, and a pediment with a coat of arms in the tympanum. | II |
| Stable wing, The Lodge; 52.34565°N 2.73550°W | — | Mid 18th century (probable) | The stable block is in red brick with dentilled eaves, and a roof of tile and slate. There are two storeys, and it consists of a main range of seven bays, a rear extension to the right, and a rear parallel range. In the centre is a round-arched carriage entrance above which is a clock face, a balustrade, and an octagonal cupola with a bell and a weathervane. In the ground floor are round-arched doorways flanked by segmental-headed windows. The windows are casements. | II |
| The Old Rectory; 52.33467°N 2.74162°W | — | Mid 18th century | The rectory, later a private house, is in brick with a slate roof, and has two storeys and an attic. It consists of two parallel gabled blocks, each with five bays, and with the central bays projecting. The doorway is Venetian in style, and above it is a Venetian window and a lunette. Elsewhere are sash windows, canted bay windows, more lunettes, and French windows. The gables have bargeboards. | II* |
| Cartshed and stable southwest of Woofferton Court Farmhouse; 52.31332°N 2.70453°W | — | Mid 18th century | The farm buildings were extended later in the century. They are in red brick on a stone plinth with a tile roof. Originally a four-bay cowshed with a granary above, a two-bay stable was added with a loft above. The buildings contain various doorways and windows, a pitching hole, and external steps leaving to the granary door. | II |
| Cartshed and stable west of Woofferton Court Farmhouse; 52.31367°N 2.70488°W | — | Mid 18th century | The former cartshed and stable are partly timber framed with weatherboarding and partly in brick on a stone plinth, and have a tile roof. The cartshed has four bays, and the stable has two bay with a loft above. | II |
| Overton; 52.34405°N 2.73305°W | — | Late 18th century | A house that was later extended, it is in stone and brick, and has dentilled eaves and a tile roof. The house consists of two parallel ranges, with extensions on the sides, and a service block at the rear. The main block has three storeys and three bays, there is a two-storey one-bay extension to the left, and a five-bay range at the rear. In the centre is a doorway that is flanked by bay windows. The windows on the front are sashes with stone lintels and keystones, and in the rear range the windows are casements. | II |
| Salwey Arms Public House and Post Office Box; 52.31224°N 2.70568°W | | Late 18th century | The public house was extended to the left and the rear in the 19th and 20th centuries, and is in brick with slate roofs. The main block has three storeys and three bays. In the centre is a doorway with pilasters, a semicircular fanlight and a pedimental hood, and the windows are sashes with segmental heads. In the wall is a 19th-century Post Office box. | II |
| Woofferton Court Farmhouse; 52.31349°N 2.70430°W | — | Late 18th century | The farmhouse is in stone and brick with deep eaves, and a slate roof with gables and bargeboards. There are two storeys and a basement, a front range with three bays, rear gabled extensions, and a rear parallel range. On the front is a gabled porch, the windows are sashes with segmental heads, and in the right return is a canted bay window. | II |
| The Lodge; 52.34542°N 2.73526°W | — | 1783 (probable) | A country house with an earlier core, it is in stone with a channelled rusticated plinth, corner pilasters, storey bands, a cornice, a parapet, and a part-hipped slate roof. There are two storeys, an attic and a basement. The entrance front has five bays, the middle three bays projecting and containing a Doric porch with four columns, and an entablature with a triglyph and paterae frieze and a balustrade. Above it is a window with console brackets and a swagged frieze, over which the parapet sweeps up, containing sash windows and with ball finials. The outer bays contain sash windows with moulded architraves, and on the sides are canted bay windows. | II* |
| Teme Aqueduct; 52.31519°N 2.68020°W | | 1789 | The aqueduct was designed by Thomas Dadford to carry the Stourport to Kington section of the Leominster Canal (now disused) over the River Teme. It is in stone with brick at the heads of the arches, and consisted of four segmental arches, one of which has fallen. The aqueduct has voussoirs, a brick parapet, and stone cutwaters. | II |
| Cold Bath House; 52.34593°N 2.73861°W | — | Late 18th to early 19th century | The bath house is in stone with a coped parapet, it is built against a natural bank, and has three bays. The central doorway and the flanking windows have round heads and pendant keystones. Inside is an entrance lobby, a changing room on the left, and steps leading down to a plunge bath. | II |
| Gosford Bridge; 52.31111°N 2.68515°W | | Early 19th century | The bridge carries the A456 road over Gosford Brook. It is in sandstone and consists of a single segmental arch. The bridge has voussoirs, a keystone, and a cambered parapet with sandstone coping. | II |
| Milepost at NGR SO 5099 7305; 52.35324°N 2.72115°W | — | Early 19th century | The milepost is on the east side of the B4361 road. It is in cast iron, and has angled plates and a sloping connecting top plate. The top plate is inscribed "RICHARDS CASTLE PARISH", and the other plates indicate the distances in miles to Tenbury Wells, Leominster, and to Ludlow. | II |
| Milepost at NGR SO 4945 7105; 52.33528°N 2.74312°W | — | Early 19th century | The milepost is on the west side of the B4361 road. It is in cast iron, and has angled plates and a sloping connecting top plate. The top plate is inscribed "RICHARDS CASTLE PARISH", and the other plates indicate the distances in miles to Leominster and to Ludlow. | II |
| Policeman's Corner; 52.34903°N 2.72155°W | | Early 19th century | The former toll house is in stone with a hipped slate roof. There are two storeys, and an octagonal plan, a rear wing, and an outshut. The house contains casement windows with hood moulds, a toll tablet, and gables with plain bargeboards. | II |
| Gates, piers and walls, The Lodge; 52.34604°N 2.72644°W | | Early 19th century | At the entrance to the drive is a carriage entrance flanked by two pedestrian entrances. They have four stone piers, each with a moulded chamfered plinth, a plain entablature, a cornice, and a pyramidal cap. The carriageway and pedestrian gates are in cast iron, and attached to the outer piers are swept retaining stone walls with a chamfered plinth and plain coping. | II |
| Rectory Farmhouse; 52.33419°N 2.74278°W | — | 1828 | The rectory, later a private house, is in stone with some brick at the rear, and with a slate roof. There are two storeys, and it consists of a main range, a cross-wing on the right, and a wing at the rear. In the centre is an open porch with a flat hood and ornamental cresting, and above it is an initialled and dated tablet. To the left is a canted bay window, and the other windows are casements with Tudor-style hood moulds. The gables have pierced bargeboards and pendants. | II |
| Lodge to The Lodge; 52.34607°N 2.72625°W | | 19th century | The lodge is in stone with an eaves cornice and a hipped slate roof. There is a single storey, and a cruciform plan. On the front is projecting porch and three casement windows. | II |
| Clock House, Moor Park; 52.33958°N 2.73099°W | — | c. 1870 | Originally a stable block, it is in red brick with corbelled eaves and tile roofs. There are two storeys, a central range of four bays, and projecting single-bay wings at each end, and at the left is a lower two-storey range. In the centre is an ornamental gable containing a clock face with a hood mould. To the right is a doorway, and to the left is an elliptical arch. Most of the windows are multi-pane casements. | II |
| Gates and piers, Moor Park; 52.34347°N 2.73377°W | — | c. 1870 | Near the entrance to the drive to the house is a carriage entrance flanked by pedestrian entrances. The four gate piers are in brick and sandstone, and each pier has inset courses, a dentilled moulded cornice, a frieze, a cap with pediments, a tapering pedestal, and a ball finial. Between them are iron gates. | II |
| Lodge, Moor Park; 52.34319°N 2.73397°W | | c. 1870 | The lodge is in red brick with rendered eaves, a tile roof with hipped cross-roofs, and tall chimney stacks. There is one storey and an attic, a cruciform plan, and a later single-storey gabled extension on the right. In the centre is a porch with an ornate open screen above the door, and this is flanked by mullioned and transomed windows with pediments. The other windows are casements, and at the rear are two hipped dormers. | II |
| All Saints Church; 52.33171°N 2.74358°W | | 1892 | The church, designed by Richard Norman Shaw, is in Grinshill sandstone and has a tile roof. It consists of a nave, a south aisle, a north porch, a chancel with north and south vestries, and a southwest tower incorporating a south porch. The tower has three stages, diagonal buttresses, a stair turret to the west, an embattled parapet with corner pinnacles, and a pyramidal roof. The east and west windows are in Perpendicular style, and the others are in Decorated style. | I |
