= Woofferton transmitting station =

Transmitter station in Shropshire, England

Woofferton
- Location within Shropshire
- Location: Woofferton, Ludlow, Shropshire
- Coordinates: 52.3098°N 2.7204°W
- Grid reference: SO5088868250

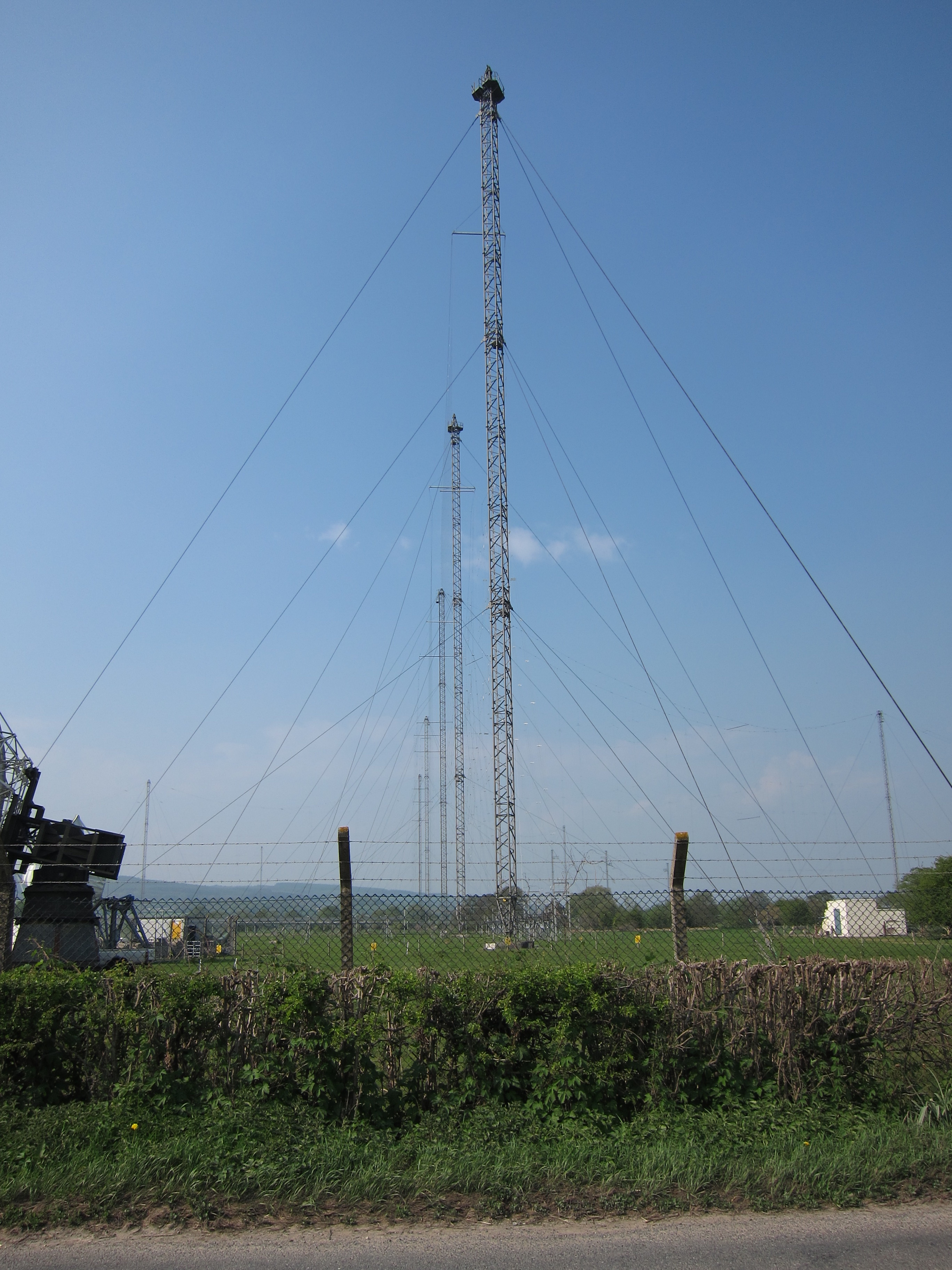
Shortwave radio station, Woofferton

The Woofferton transmitting station is owned and operated by Encompass Digital Media, as one of the BBC's assets which were handed over as part of the privatization of World Service distribution and transmission in 1997. It is the last remaining UK shortwave broadcasting site, located at Woofferton, south of Ludlow, Shropshire, England. The large site spreads across into neighbouring Herefordshire.

The station was originally built by the BBC during World War II to house additional shortwave (HF) broadcasting transmitters. When it officially started broadcasting on 17 October 1943 it had six 50 kW RCA transmitters, obtained by lend-lease. The site has been modernised many times over the years and is now DRM (Digital Radio Mondiale) capable providing daily digital radio programmes. Woofferton is used to broadcast shortwave radio programmes on HF 4 MHz – 26 MHz to Europe, Russia, Africa, the Middle East and South Asia for BBC World Service, KBS World Radio, Radio Farda, among other international broadcasters. The site is also used for satellite communications and monitoring.

== Construction ==
The site was built by J. L. Eve Construction during the Second World War, for short-wave transmissions across Europe.

== Cold War era ==
During the Cold War, the station was equipped with six Marconi BD272 250 kW shortwave transmitters. Much of the capacity was leased by the BBC to the Voice of America (VoA) in order to enhance the latter's coverage in the Eastern Bloc. It provided a stronger shortwave broadcast signal into the Eastern Bloc than any other western shortwave broadcast transmitter during the years of Soviet jamming.

== Privatisation ==
All the BBC's transmitting facilities were privatised in the 1990s. The shortwave sites were sold to Merlin Communications, which was acquired by VT Group plc trading under the name VT Communications until acquired by Babcock International Group in March 2010. Subsequently, Babcock's Media Services was acquired by global technology services company Encompass Digital Media in September 2018.

== Transmitters ==
Woofferton Transmitting Station currently has ten HF transmitters. There are 3 × Riz 250 kW (installed 2007–2008), 1 × Riz 500 kW (installed 2006), 4 × 300 kW Marconi B6124s (installed 1980) and 2 × 250 kW Marconi BD272s (installed 1963). The Riz transmitters are Digital Radio Mondiale capable and transmit digital programmes on a daily basis for BBC World Service, Voice of America, and KBS. It also had a 300-watt mediumwave (MW) transmitter for BBC Hereford and Worcester (formerly used by BBC Radio Shropshire), as well as a 1 kW VHF FM transmitter for local Ludlow commercial station Sunshine Radio.

== Services available ==
Analogue radio (FM VHF)

Frequency	kW	Service
105.9 MHz	1	Sunshine Radio

Analogue radio (AM medium wave)

Frequency	kW	Service
1584 kHz	0.5	BBC Hereford and Worcester (ceased transmitting)
