= Tenbury Railway =

UK railway company

The Tenbury Railway was a standard gauge railway that connected Tenbury in Worcestershire, England, with the nearby main line at Woofferton. It opened in 1861. An independent railway company, the Tenbury and Bewdley Railway continued to Bewdley in Worcestershire, opening in 1864. The route formed by the two railways was sometimes referred to as the Wyre Forest line or simply the Tenbury Line.

The Tenbury Railway never achieved great commercial success, and the decline in dependence on railways for local transport in the 1950s resulted in a steep fall-off in use of the line. The line closed completely in 1961, except that Tenbury station was served by a school passenger service from the Bewdley direction for a year, then closing; a goods service from Bewdley to Tenbury closed in 1964, and the former railway had no further railway activity.

== Early proposals ==
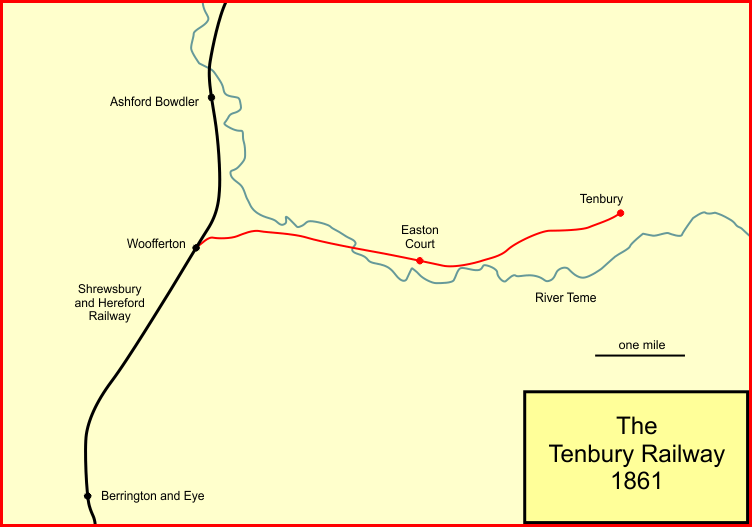
The Tenbury Railway

The Shrewsbury and Hereford Railway opened its standard gauge line throughout on 6 December 1852. It had a station at Woofferton, and Tenbury Wells (Note: The township had been called Tenbury Wells since 1840, but the railway was slow to adopt that usage.) was a little over five miles distant. It became evident that communities directly served by a railway prospered, and those not so connected declined, and business interests in Tenbury realised that their town was at a disadvantage.

Tenbury Railway Act 1859
- Act of Parliament
- Parliament of the United Kingdom
- Long title: An Act for making a Railway from the Woofferton Station of the Shrewsbury and Hereford Railway in the County of Hereford to a Point near Tenbury in the County of Worcester; and for other Purposes.
- Citation: 22 & 23 Vict. c. xvi

Dates
- Royal assent: 21 July 1859

William Norris was a local man and his energies were directed at this stage into getting a branch line to Tenbury built. Plans were drawn up and deposited in October 1858 under the title of 'Woofferton and Tenbury Railway' (the 'Woofferton' prefix quickly being dropped). A Parliamentary Bill for a branch line from Woofferton to Tenbury went to the 1859 session. Notwithstanding some discussion about whether an extension to Bewdley was immediately desirable, the Tenbury Railway Act 1859 (22 & 23 Vict. c. xvi) obtained royal assent on 21 July 1859. Authorised capital was £30,000, of which the Shrewsbury and Hereford Railway might subscribe £5,000. The S&HR assisted by selling lands, including the defunct Leominster Canal, and much of the Tenbury Railway route used some of the alignment of the canal.

During the construction period, further negotiations with the Shrewsbury and Hereford Railway took place, resulting in the larger company agreeing to work the line for £500 per annum plus 40% of the balance of receipts.

== Construction and opening ==
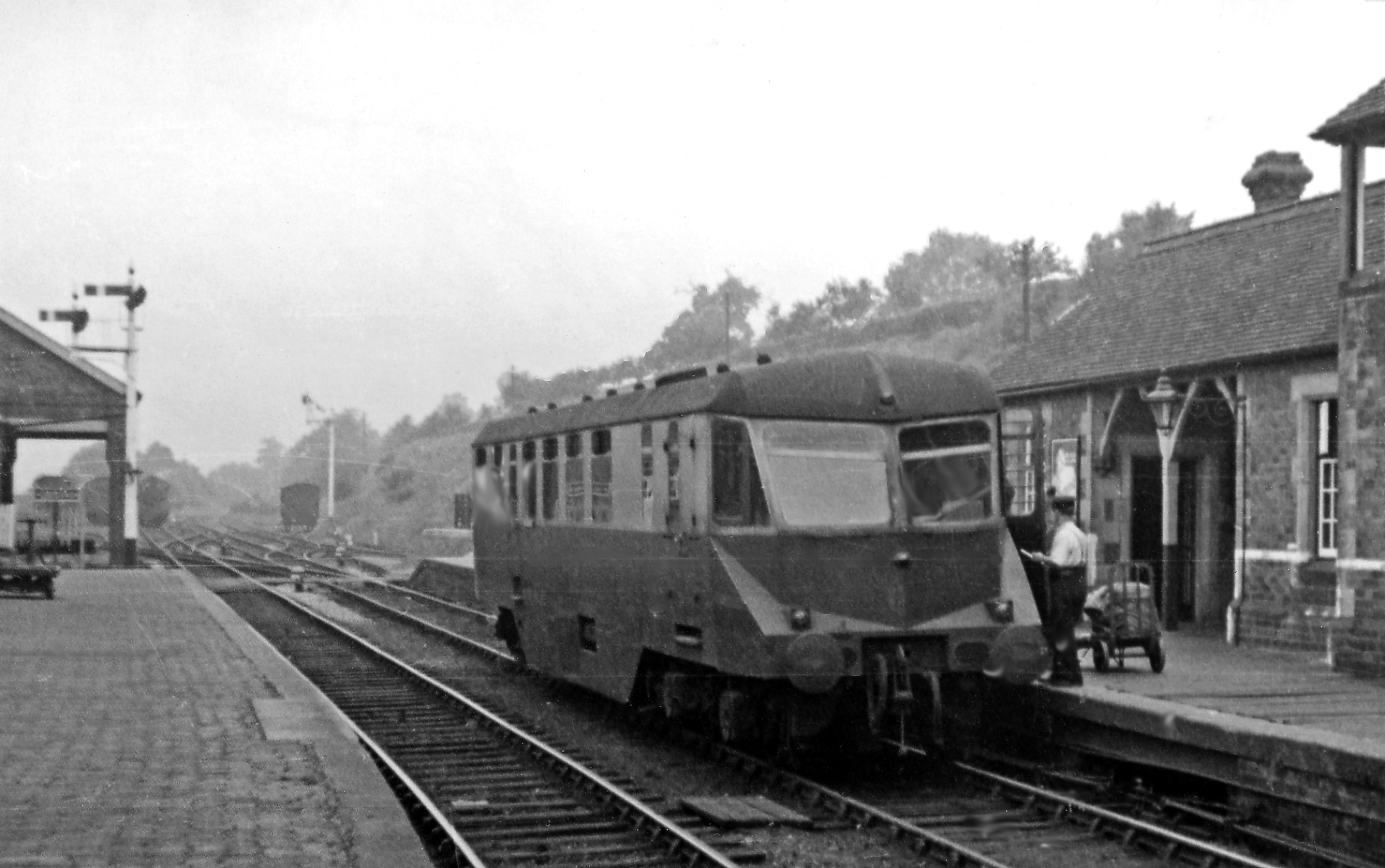
A GWR diesel railcar at Tenbury Wells Station

David Wylie, assistant engineer to the Shrewsbury and Hereford Railway was appointed engineer and Brassey and Field were appointed contractors. The line did not take long to construct, and Colonel Yolland of the Board of Trade inspected the line on 27 July 1861 with a view to authorising passenger traffic. He approved the opening, but required a full double junction to be provided at Woofferton: only the southbound line was connected; and the signals there were inadequate.

The railway opened on 1 August 1861; there were five trains each way daily; the railway contractor Thomas Brassey worked the line, as he was working the S&HR main line at the time..

The Tenbury station was actually at Burford, the seat of Lord Northwick, and on the north side of the River Teme. The town of Tenbury is on the south side of the River Teme, which is spanned by an ornate road bridge. The county boundary is in the centre of the river, and whilst Tenbury Wells is in Worcestershire, the railway station was in Shropshire.

== Tenbury and Bewdley Railway ==
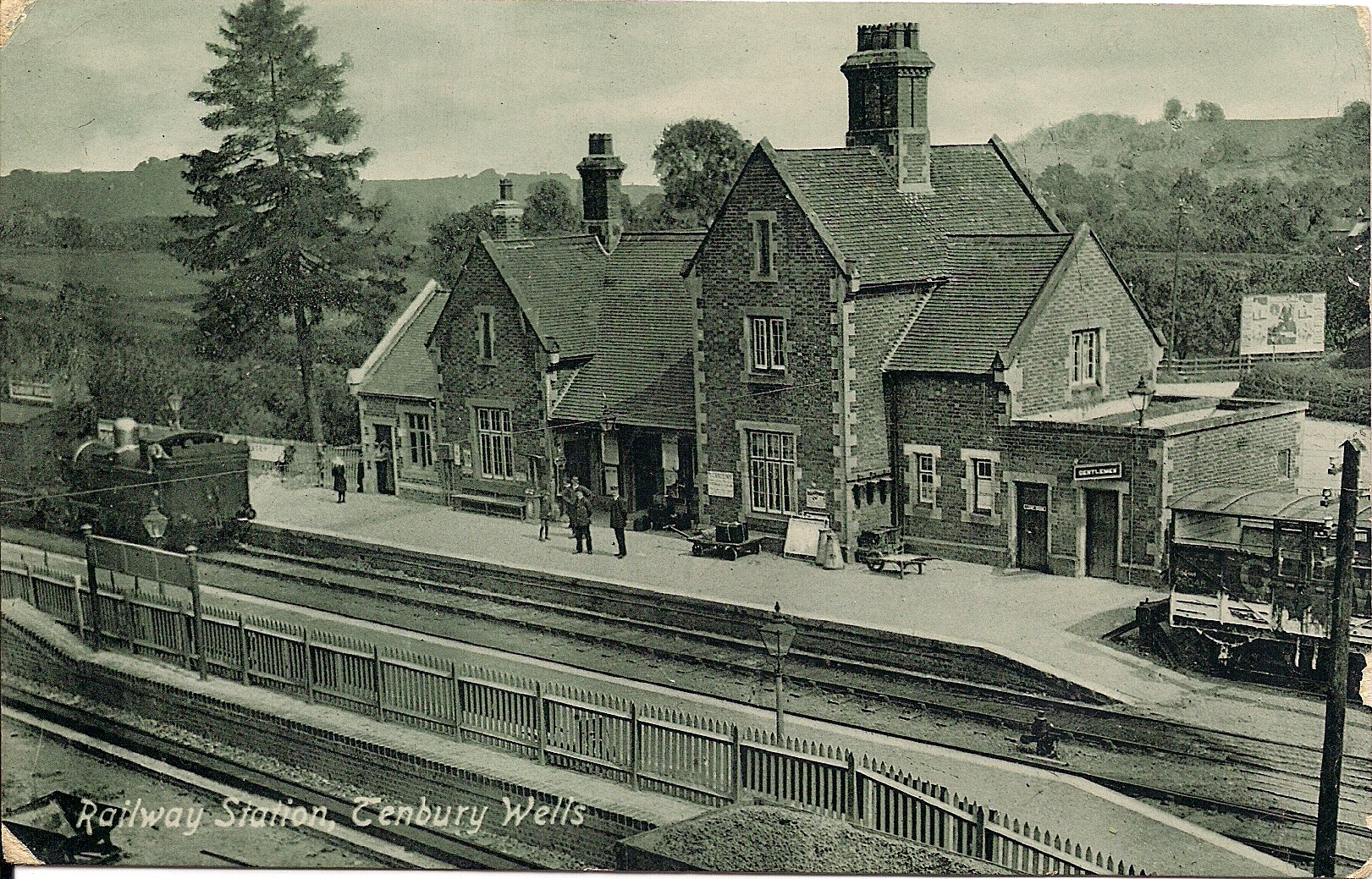
Tenbury Wells railway station

When the Tenbury line was under construction, there was already enthusiasm to extend the line to Bewdley. The Tenbury and Bewdley Railway obtained the Royal Assent on 3 July 1860; it was to run from Tenbury to the Severn Valley Railway at Bewdley.

== Amalgamations ==
From 1 July 1862 the Shrewsbury and Hereford Railway was leased jointly, 50% by the London and North Western Railway and 50% by the Great Western Railway and the West Midland Railway together. The following year the GWR and the West Midland themselves amalgamated, so that the main line at Woofferton was joint between the GWR and the LNWR. The Tenbury Railway was transferred to joint line status, so that from 1 July 1862 it was leased to the two other companies jointly. Thomas Brassey handed over the working of the line to the LNWR, who worked the line on behalf of the joint lessees.

== Opening of the Bewdley line ==
The Tenbury and Bewdley Railway opened fully on 13 August 1864. It used the Tenbury Railway station at Tenbury, where it formed an end-on junction.

== Absorbed by the LNWR and GWR ==
From 1 January 1869, the Tenbury Railway was acquired by the LNWR and GWR jointly, by Act of 1 December 1868. (Note: Grant says this was on 1 July 1871.)

== Bewdley loop ==
The railway network at Bewdley connected southwards towards Droitwich Spa, but the Bewdley Curve or Bewdley Loop, giving direct running north-east towards Kidderminster, opened on 1 June 1878.

== Train service ==
The passenger train service indicated in the Bradshaw's Guide varied little over the years. In 1895 there were four trains daily (not Sundays) between Bewdley and Woofferton, with an additional two on the Tenbury to Woofferton section. By 1910 this had changed to five and four respectively, remaining similar from 1922 to 1960.

== Railway organisation ==
At the beginning of 1923 most of the railways of Great Britain were grouped, by Government order, into one or other of four new railways; the process is referred to as the "grouping", following the Railways Act 1921. The Great Western Railway amalgamated with other lines but retained its identity; the LNWR was a constituent of a new company, the London, Midland and Scottish Railway.

From 1 March 1932 the Shrewsbury office of the GWR had taken over the routine management of the S&HR line and the Tenbury branch.

At nationalisation in 1948, the Tenbury line was allocated jointly to the London Midland Region of British Railways, as successor to the LMS, and the Western Region as successor to the GWR. Joint status in common ownership proved to be of doubtful value, and in September 1948 that situation was rationalised and the whole line came under the control of the Western Region.

== Decline ==
The rural nature of the area served by the line meant that as soon as reliable road transport for goods and passengers became available, use of the railway declined. The decline was steep and after nationalisation it was plain that the losses were unsustainable.

The former Tenbury Railway line was to be completely closed, except that a basic residual train service from Kidderminster would continue to run to and from Tenbury Wells station, so that the station continued in basic use. One passenger train ran in each direction, chiefly in connection with school pupils' journeys, was to operate for a year from 31 July 1961 on an experimental basis.

The experiment was not thought to be successful, and passenger operation, and use of the Tenbury Wells station, ceased on 1 August 1962. A very basic goods service continued to Tenbury, but this too was withdrawn on 6 January 1964, and all railway activity on the former Tenbury Railway ceased.

== Station list ==
- Woofferton; on S&HR main line; opened 6 December 1853; closed 31 July 1961;
- Easton Court; opened 1 August 1861; closed 31 July 1961;
- Tenbury; opened 1 August 1861; renamed Tenbury Wells 1912; closed 31 July 1961. (Note: Christiansen says "The GWR called it simply Tenbury in public timetables, but Tenbury Wells (which was also the LNWR designation) in working timetables.")

== Bibliography ==
- Beddoes, Keith; Smith, William H (1995). The Tenbury and Bewdley Railway. Didcot: Wild Swan Publications. ISBN 1 874103 27 5.
