= Leominster Canal =

Canal in England, now defunct

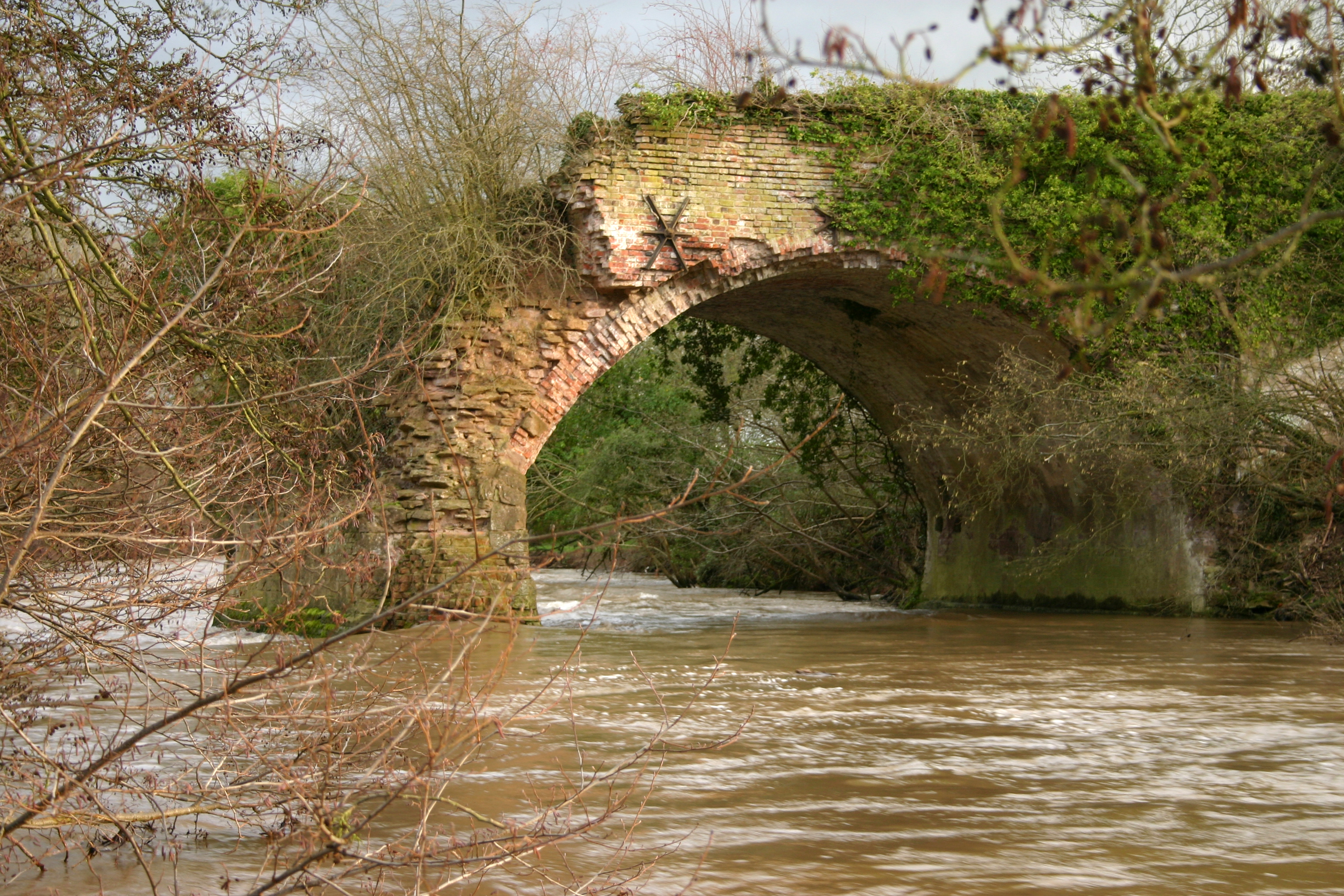
- Aqueduct over the river Teme at Little Hereford
- Interactive map of Leominster Canal

Specifications
- Locks: 16
- Status: Abandoned, partially built over by railway

History
- Original owner: Leominster Canal Proprietors
- Principal engineer: Thomas Dadford jr
- Date of act: 1791
- Date of first use: 1794
- Date completed: 1796 (Leominster to Marbrook)
- Date closed: 1858

Geography
- Start point: Leominster (Planned from Kington)
- End point: Marbrook (Planned to Stourport)

The Leominster Canal was an English canal which ran for just over 18 miles from Mamble to Leominster through 16 locks and a number of tunnels, some of which suffered engineering problems even before the canal opened. Originally, the canal was part of a much more ambitious plan to run 46 miles from Stourport to Kington.

== History ==
=== Construction ===
Following the opening of the Staffordshire and Worcestershire Canal in 1772, which linked the industrial Midlands to the River Severn at Stourport, the engineer Robert Whitworth proposed a canal to link Stourport to Hereford, passing through Pensax and Leominster in 1777. Meetings were held at Leominster and Tenbury Wells in 1789, at which it was decided to survey possible routes from Leominster to Stourport. Thomas Dadford, Jr. carried out the survey, and presented a plan to a meeting in December 1789 for a 31-mile (50 km) canal, costing £83,000, with estimated receipts of £4,300 per year. Three tunnels would be required, at Putnal Field, Southnet and Pensax.

Leominster Canal Act 1791
- Act of Parliament
- Parliament of Great Britain
- Long title: An Act for making and maintaining a Navigable Canal from Kington, in the County of Hereford, by or through Leominster, to join the River Severn near Stourport Bridge, in the County of Worcester.
- Citation: 31 Geo. 3. c. 69
- Territorial extent: Great Britain

Dates
- Royal assent: 13 May 1791
- Commencement: 10 August 1790 (Note: Start of session.)
Other legislation
Amended by	Leominster Canal Act 1803; Leominster Canal Sale Act 1847
Relates to	Leominster Canal Act 1795; Leominster Canal Act 1796

Status: Amended

Text of statute as originally enacted

The Aqueduct over the River Rea, north of the village of Newnham Bridge, Parish of Knighton on Teme

Despite the low estimated returns, a meeting in January 1790 decided to proceed with Dadford's canal. A further meeting was held in Kington in April, and there were calls to build a connecting canal to the town. The two schemes became one, and the total length of the canal would be 46 miles (74 km). From Kington, locks would raise the level of the canal by 48 feet (15 m), and then it would fall by 496 feet (151 m) to reach the River Severn. The lack of major towns or industries did not seem to worry the proposers, and the Leominster Canal Act 1791 (31 Geo. 3. c. 69) was obtained on 13 May 1791, which allowed the Proprietors to raise £150,000, with another £40,000 if necessary.

Dadford was appointed as Engineer, a position which he held until 1795, although he only devoted one-quarter of his time to the Leominster Canal, as he performed the same role for the Monmouthshire Canal and was contracted to them for the remaining three-quarters of his time. Work began soon after his appointment, and by October 1794, the section from Woofferton near Tenbury to Marlbrook near Mamble was open for traffic.

The following year saw most of the section from Leominster to Woofferton completed, while beyond Marlbrook the 1,254-yard (1,147 m) Southnet tunnel was finished and work started on an aqueduct over the River Lugg at Kingsland. Around £90,000 had been spent to reach this stage. There were problems with the Southnet tunnel, part of which collapsed in 1795. The Proprietors sought the advice of John Rennie, who criticised Dadford's work. He estimated that £20,000 would be required to rectify the existing works from Southnet to Leominster, and that another £135,937 would be needed to complete the project.

Undaunted, the proprietors applied for a second act of Parliament, the Leominster Canal Act 1795 (36 Geo. 3. c. 70), which they obtained on 26 April 1796, authorising them to raise or borrow a further £180,000. The 330-yard (300 m) tunnel at Putnall Fields, which had proved very difficult to construct, was completed in July 1796, completing the route to Leominster, and creating a working canal which was 18.5 miles (29.8 km) long. On 1 June 1797, a ceremonial cut was made on the banks of the River Severn, where the canal was eventually planned to join it, but only £62,582 had been raised under the terms of the second act of Parliament, and with some £25,000 owing, all work ceased.

Leominster Canal Act 1803
- Act of Parliament
- Parliament of the United Kingdom
- Long title: An Act for enabling the Company of Proprietors of the Leominster Canal to raise Money to discharge their Debts, and to complete the Canal, and for explaining and amending the Acts for making and maintaining the said Canal, and for granting to the said Company further and other Powers.
- Citation: 43 Geo. 3. c. cxli
- Territorial extent: United Kingdom

Dates
- Royal assent: 11 August 1803
- Commencement: 11 August 1803 (Note: The Acts of Parliament (Commencement) Act 1793.)
Other legislation
Amends	Leominster Canal Act 1791; Leominster Canal Act 1795; Leominster Canal Act 1796
Amended by	Leominster Canal Act 1826; Leominster Canal Sale Act 1847

Status: Amended

Text of statute as originally enacted

In 1803, the proprietors sought the advice of John Hodgkinson, as to how the canal could be completed. As a railway engineer, Hodgkinson recommended that railways should be built at either end of the existing section of canal, to connect to Kington and Stourport. Although another act of Parliament, the Leominster Canal Act 1803 (43 Geo. 3. c. cxli), was obtained, no construction work took place. Nine years later, they again approached Hodgkinson, and this time he suggested that they should abandon the authorised route to Stourport and extend the canal on a new alignment to the River Severn at Worcester. Nothing came of this plan, either.

=== Operation ===
In January 1794 the canal opened from Marlbrook to Woofferton and seven boatloads of coal were transported from the Mamble collieries on the first day. Engineering difficulties delayed the opening of Putnall Tunnel (south of Woofferton) until 1796. By the end of that year an 18.5 miles (29.8 km) stretch of the canal was open between Marlbrook and Leominster and on the first day 14 boatloads of coal arrived in Leominster. Coal from the Mamble collieries was brought down the hill on tramways to Southnet wharf, where it was loaded onto barges and transported to Leominster.

For the next 60 years, the canal carried coal to Leominster, enabling the Mamble collieries to prosper. However the traffic from Mamble Colliery was not sufficient to run the canal at a profit, so the owners were constantly seeking to extend it eastwards to meet the River Severn, although this never materialised.

=== Decline ===
The canal never paid a dividend. What little money was collected was mostly paid for tolls on the transport of coal. In 1858, after sustained pressure by the canal company, the Shrewsbury and Hereford Railway paid £12,000 for the canal, which valued each £100 share at £16, and drained it soon after to sell the land. Part of the route was subsequently used for the Tenbury and Bewdley Railway that connected Woofferton to Bewdley via Tenbury Wells station, which was actually in Burford, Shropshire, not Tenbury Wells.

== Remains ==
Although the canal has been closed for over 150 years, there are some remains left, including an aqueduct over the River Rea, and parts of a three-arched aqueduct over the River Teme. The centre arch of the latter was destroyed as part of an explosives exercise during the Second World War, but the remains became a Grade II listed structure in 2000. The Rea aqueduct consisted of a single brick span of 45 feet (13.7 m) with a brick-lined trough to carry the canal over it. It was thought to be the largest brick span at the time of its construction, and like the Teme aqueduct, it was Grade II listed in 2000. It has become a right of way across the River Rea, but the footpath was closed in 2014 following a partial collapse of the canal trough. The Friends of the Leominster Canal exists to raise awareness of the waterway and holds visits to the canal and associated features.

== Points of interest ==
Point	Coordinates (Links to map resources)	OS Grid Ref	Notes
Stourport	52.3419°N 2.2965°W	SO798715	proposed terminus
Wharf House, Southnet	52.3308°N 2.4877°W	SO668704	
Rea aqueduct	52.3298°N 2.5134°W	SO651703	
Railway cutting near Newnham	52.3248°N 2.5196°W	SO646697	Newnham tunnel?
Railway near Tenbury	52.3190°N 2.5844°W	SO602691	Followed line of canal
Teme aqueduct	52.3153°N 2.6807°W	SO536687	
Route through Woofferton	52.3158°N 2.7107°W	SO520684	locks nearby
Putnall Tunnel	52.2925°N 2.7342°W	SO500663	South portal
Stockton locks	52.2451°N 2.7255°W	SO505610	approximate
Leominster	52.2338°N 2.7298°W	SO502597	Location uncertain
Kington	52.2081°N 3.0174°W	SO305571	proposed terminus

== See also ==
- Canals of Great Britain
- History of the British canal system

== Bibliography ==
- Hadfield, Charles (1967). The Canals of South Wales and the Border. David and Charles. ISBN 978-0-7153-4027-1.
- Priestley, Joseph (1831). "Historical Account of the Navigable Rivers, Canals, and Railways, of Great Britain". Archived from the original on 4 March 2016.
- Skempton, Sir Alec; et al. (2002). A Biographical Dictionary of Civil Engineers in Great Britain and Ireland: Vol 2: 1830 to 1890. Thomas Telford. ISBN 978-0-7277-3504-1.
