= Woofferton =

Village in Shropshire, England

Coordinates: 52.311°N 2.705°W

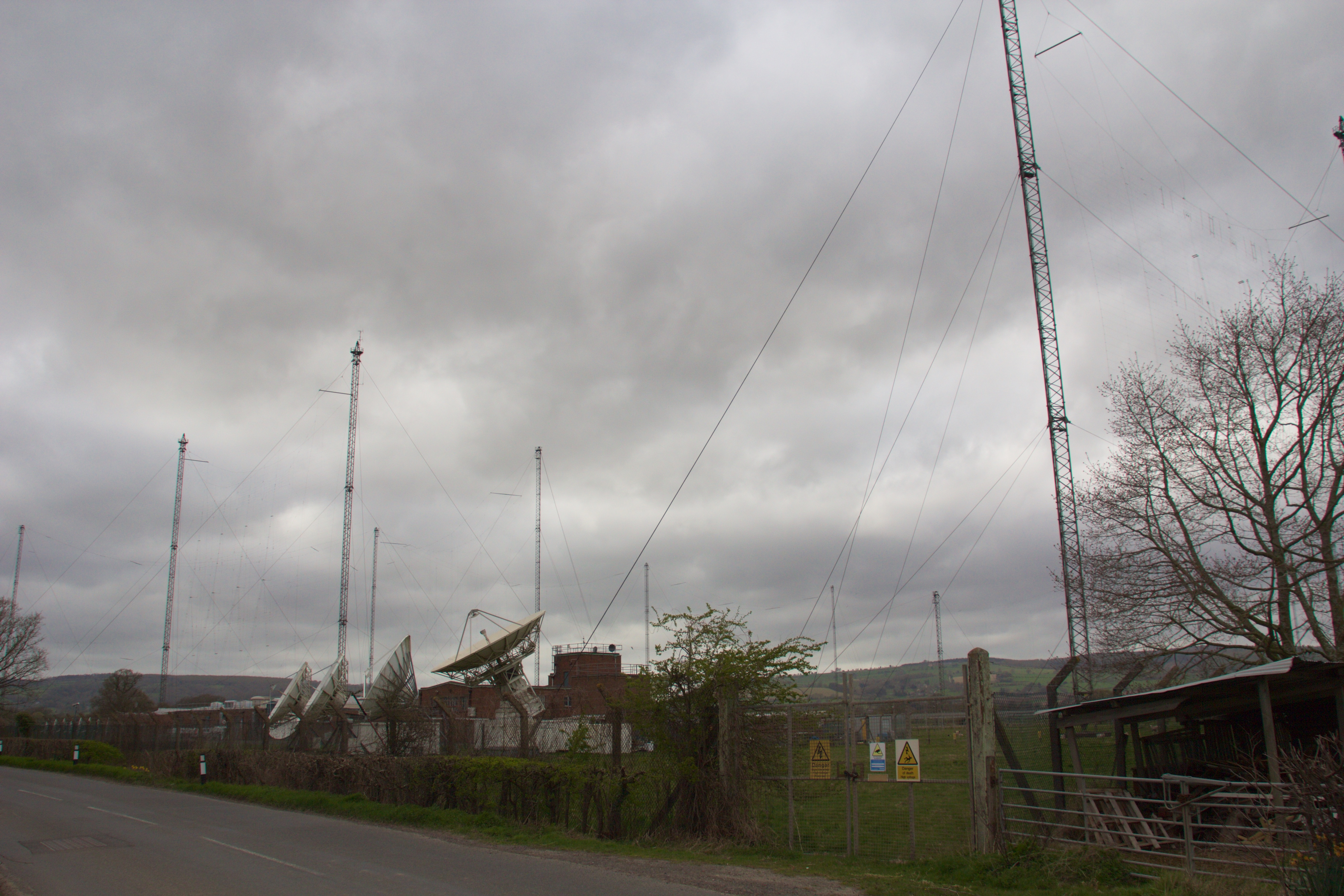
- Woofferton transmitting station

- Location within Shropshire
- OS grid reference: SO520684
- Civil parish: Richard's Castle
- Unitary authority: Shropshire
- Ceremonial county: Shropshire
- Region: West Midlands
- Country: England
- Sovereign state: United Kingdom
- Post town: LUDLOW
- Postcode district: SY8
- Dialling code: 01584
- Police: West Mercia
- Fire: Shropshire
- Ambulance: West Midlands
- UK Parliament: Ludlow

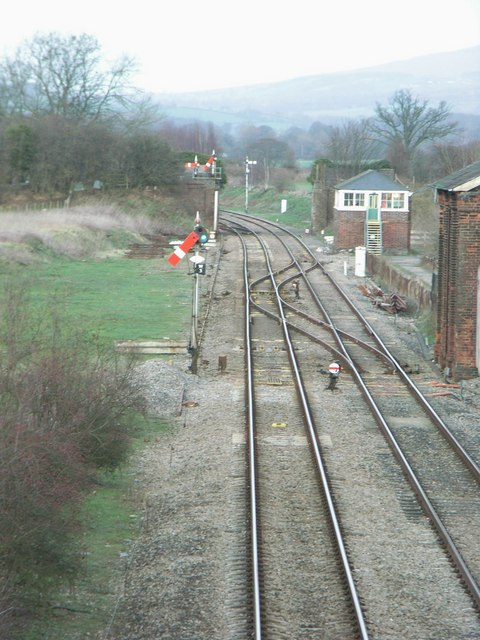
Site of Woofferton railway station (disused)

Woofferton is a village to the south of Ludlow, in Shropshire, England. It is one of Shropshire's most southerly villages and lies on the border with Herefordshire. It is part of the civil parish of Richard's Castle. The larger Herefordshire village of Brimfield is just over the border to the south.

== Transport ==
Woofferton is at the crossroads of the A49 Ludlow-Leominster road (north-south), the A456 road that strikes eastwards and the B4362 (westwards). It was formerly the site of Woofferton railway station (on the Shrewsbury and Hereford Railway) and Woofferton Junction which served the (now closed) Tenbury & Bewdley Railway.

The Welsh Marches Line runs through the currently closed station, with Transport for Wales running on the section without intermediate stations between Leominster and Ludlow.

== Places of interest ==
It is best known for the Woofferton transmitting station (a notable feature of the area's landscape), a Shell Service station and a Travelodge. The public house there - the "Salwey Arms" - is the most southerly in the county.

== See also ==
- Listed buildings in Richard's Castle (Shropshire)
