= Shrewsbury and Hereford Railway =

Railway line in England

The Shrewsbury and Hereford Railway was an English railway company that built a standard gauge line between those places. It opened its main line in 1853 (173 years ago).

Its natural ally seemed to be the Great Western Railway. With other lines it formed a route between the mineral resources of South Wales and the industries of the north-west of England, and this attracted the interest of the London and North Western Railway, which sought access to South Wales. The GWR and the LNWR jointly leased the S&HR line in 1862, later jointly acquiring ownership of it, in 1871. LNWR mineral traffic developed, and after the opening of the Severn Tunnel in 1886, the line became an important main line for traffic from the south-west of England to the north-west.

With the decline in local passenger and goods traffic in the 1950s many intermediate stations closed, but the main line continues in important use at the present day.

== Origins ==
Shrewsbury and Hereford Railway Act 1846
- Act of Parliament
- Parliament of the United Kingdom
- Long title: An Act for making a Railway from Shrewsbury to Hereford, to be called "The Shrewsbury and Hereford Railway."
- Citation: 9 & 10 Vict. c. cccxxv

Dates
- Royal assent: 3 August 1846

Other legislation
- Repealed by: Shrewsbury and Hereford Railway Act 1856

Status: Repealed

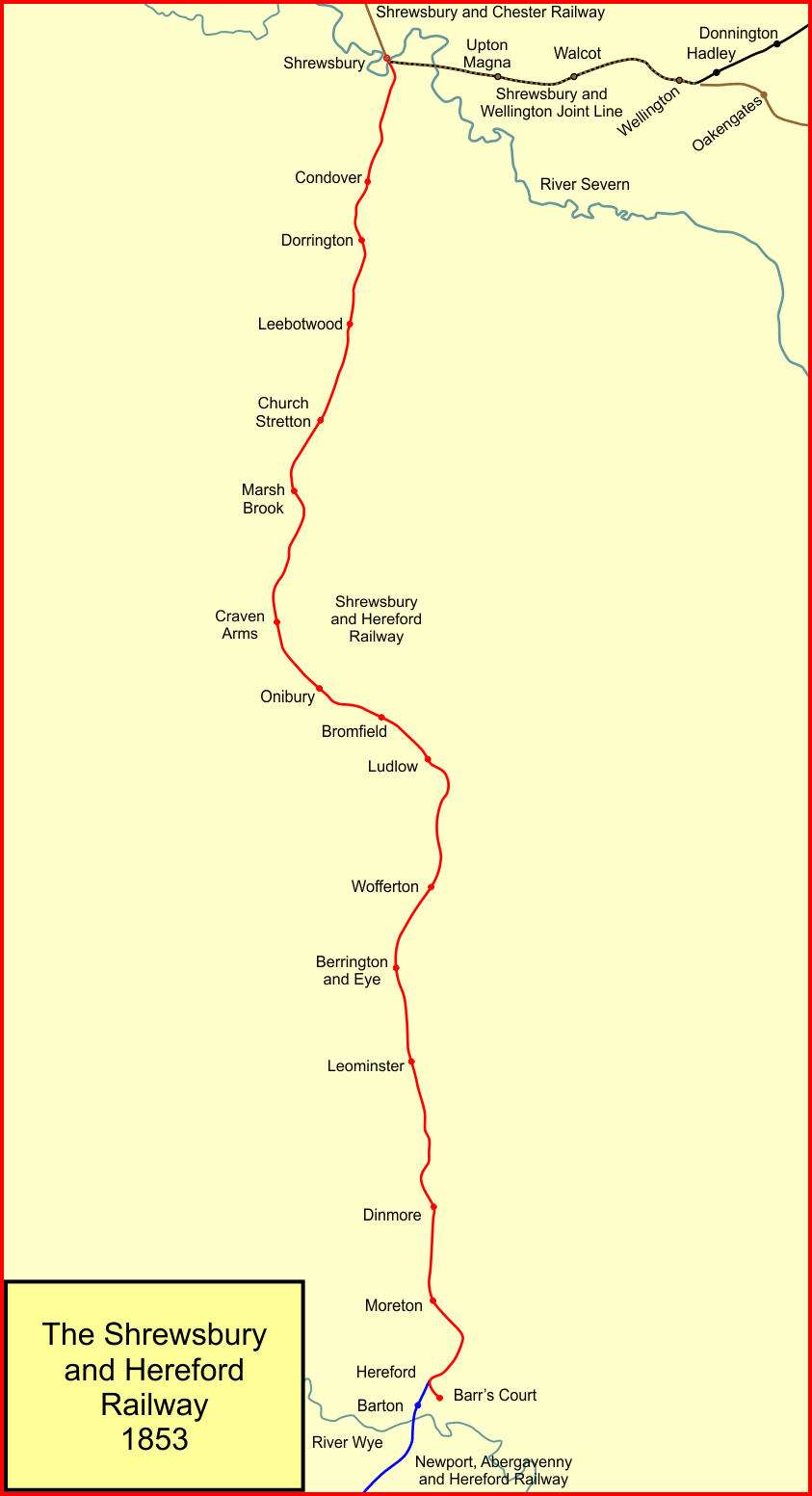
The Shrewsbury and Hereford Railway

On 3 August 1846, 16 railway bills were passed in Parliament; one of these was the Shrewsbury and Hereford Railway Act 1846 (9 & 10 Vict. c. cccxxv) for the Shrewsbury and Hereford Railway, with authorised capital of £800,000. Another was for the Newport, Abergavenny and Hereford Railway, which was to take over the Hereford Railway and modernise it.

The Hereford Railway had been opened in 1829, and with the Llanvihangel Railway and the Grosmont Railway, it formed a 26-mile (42 km) route to the Brecknock and Abergavenny Canal. Those railways were in fact plateways, using L-shaped tram plates and horse traction.

The intention of the S&HR promoters was to form, with other lines, a through route between the manufacturing districts of the north west of England and the mining districts of South Wales and Bristol.

Although the broad gauge allies of the Great Western Railway had expressed an interest, the S&HR was to be a standard gauge line, and the promoters would "on no account permit a breach of gauge between the North and South". There was a clear inclination towards the London and North Western Railway, which at that time was seeking access to the South Wales industrial area. It would be 50 miles (80 km) in length.

== Construction ==
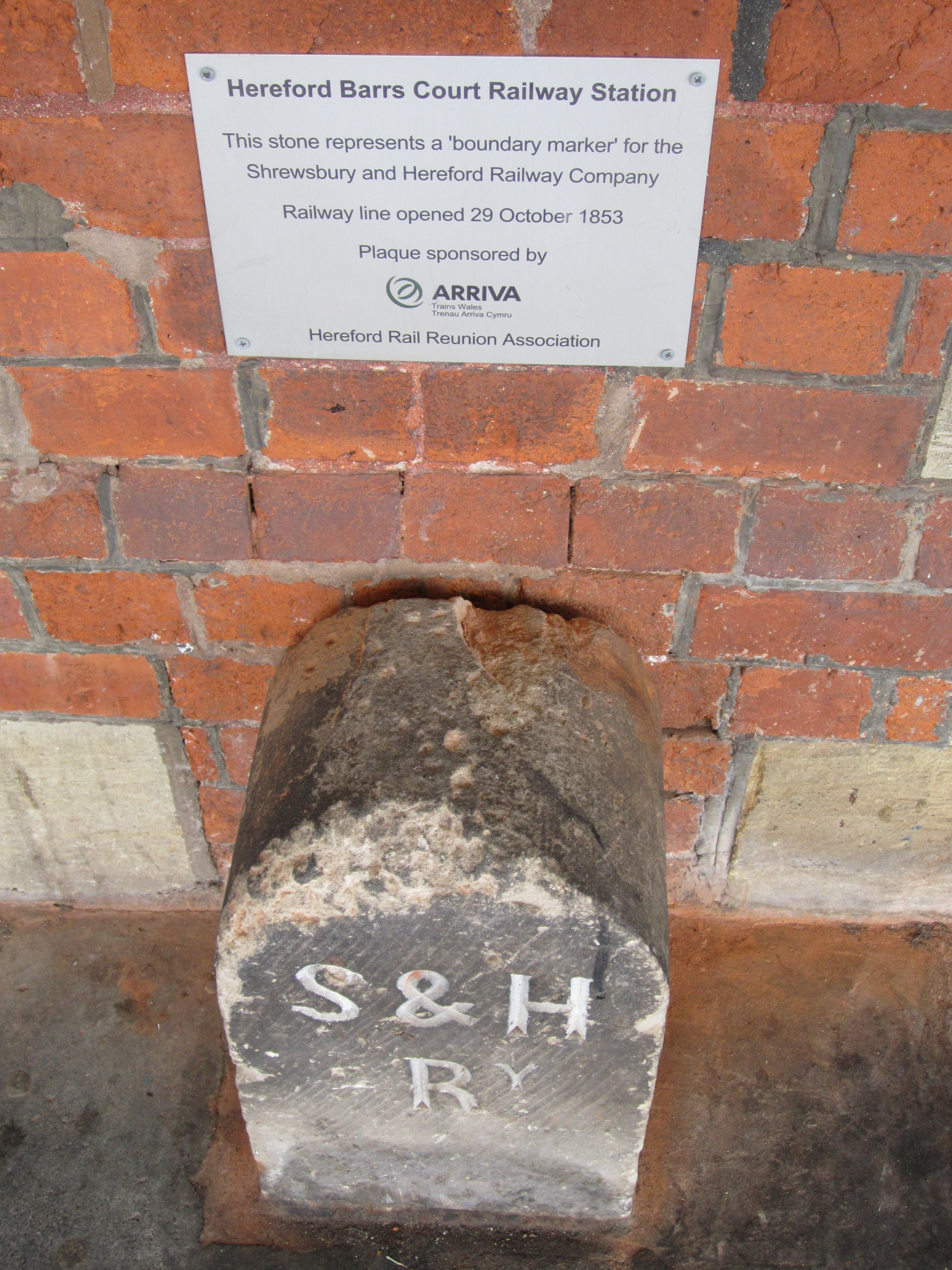
A preserved boundary marker for the S&H at Hereford station in 2011

The engineer for the construction of the line was Henry Robertson.

1846 was a peak year for authorising railway schemes: there were 435 railway bills in the session as a whole. A financial slump followed, and it became impossible to get money for railway projects, and the directors were unable to proceed. In 1848 and 1849 efforts were made to reduce the estimated cost of construction so as to be able to make some progress. A single track line, and use of the Leominster Canal bed for the formation of the railway might bring the cost down to £480,000.

Shrewsbury and Hereford Railway Amendment Act 1850
- Act of Parliament
- Parliament of the United Kingdom
- Long title: An Act to amend the Act relating to the Shrewsbury and Hereford Railway Company.
- Citation: 13 & 14 Vict. c. xxvi

Dates
- Royal assent: 25 June 1850

Text of statute as originally enacted

In fact the time limit for construction set by Parliament expired and new powers were obtained in the Shrewsbury and Hereford Railway Amendment Act 1850 (13 & 14 Vict. c. xxvi). By this time, money had become easier to obtain, and a contract was let to Thomas Brassey for £345,822. The bridges would be made for a double line, but Dinmore Hill Tunnel would be a single line bore. The Shrewsbury station was to be built jointly with other lines: the Shrewsbury and Birmingham Railway, the Shrewsbury and Chester Railway, and the Shropshire Union Railway.

The days of austerity seemed to have passed, and the Shrewsbury station was of an elaborate character in the Tudor Gothic style. The station was ready and in use by the S&BR and the Shropshire Union Railway joint line (from Wellington) on 1 June 1849.

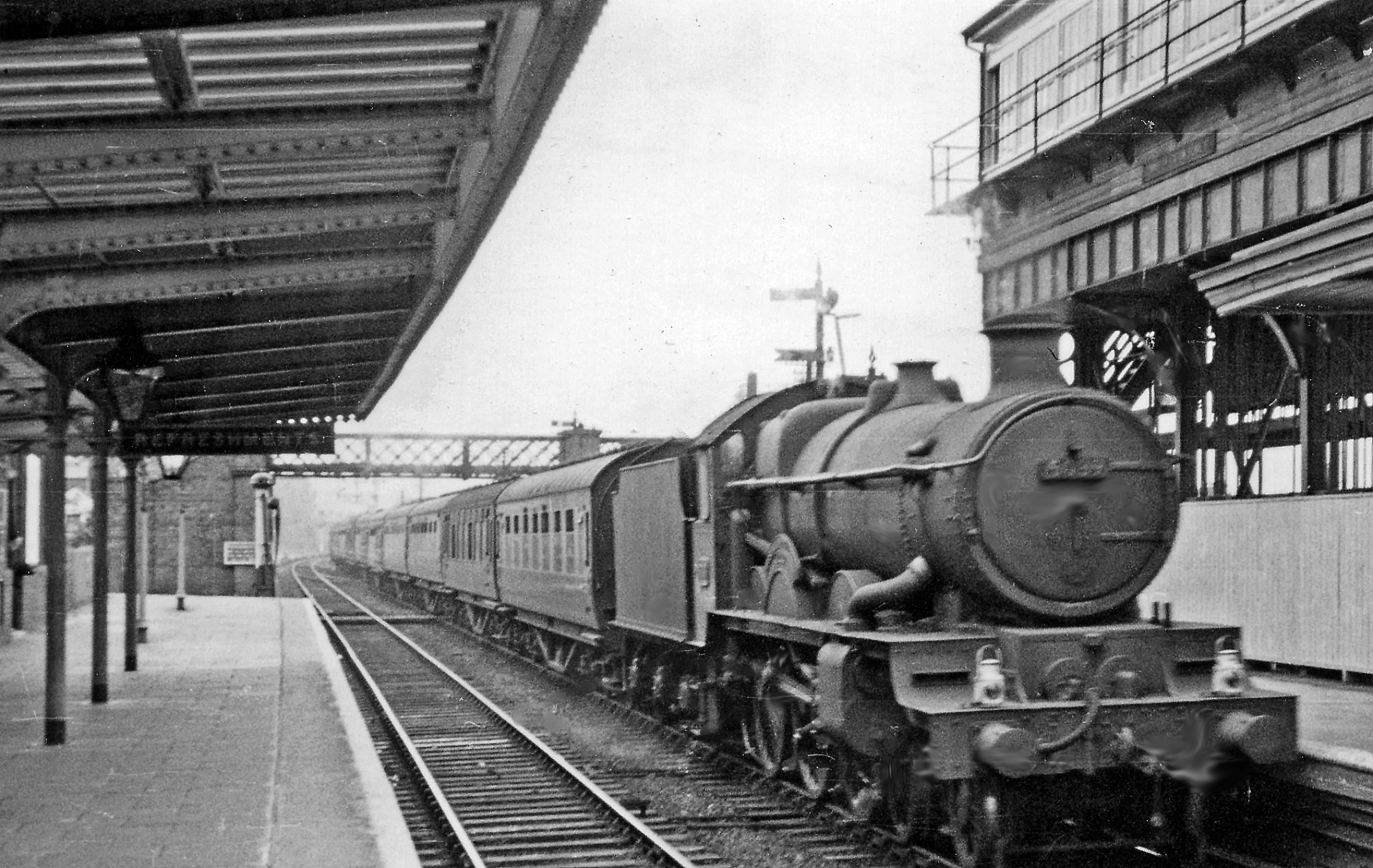
Leominster railway station

The first part of the S&HR line was opened as a single line from Shrewsbury to Ludlow on 20 April 1852, and it was worked by Thomas Brassey, the contractor for the construction. The remainder was ready and opened throughout to the Barrs Court station at Hereford on 6 December 1853. A mile of single line from what became Barr's Court Junction to Barton station at Hereford, connecting in to the NA&HR line, was not opened until 14 days later due to a lack of proper signals at the junction.

The Barr's Court station was constructed jointly with the Hereford, Ross and Gloucester Railway; for some time the station was in effect two terminal stations, the S&H entering and leaving at the north end only. The HR&GR was a broad gauge line.

Shrewsbury and Hereford Railway (Leasing) Act 1854
- Act of Parliament
- Parliament of the United Kingdom
- Long title: An Act to enable the Shrewsbury and Hereford Railway Company to lease their Undertaking.
- Citation: 17 & 18 Vict. c. clxxiv

Dates
- Royal assent: 24 July 1854

Text of statute as originally enacted

Brassey worked the line at his own risk, paying 3.5% on the cost. From 1 July 1853 this was changed to a lease for nine years; a lease to Brassey was authorised by the Shrewsbury and Hereford Railway (Leasing) Act 1854 (17 & 18 Vict. c. clxxiv). During the final four years of the lease Brassey was to pay the company 4% and half of surplus profits. The income from Brassey's contract enabled the company to pay 6% dividends on ordinary shares.

== Alliances and rivalry ==
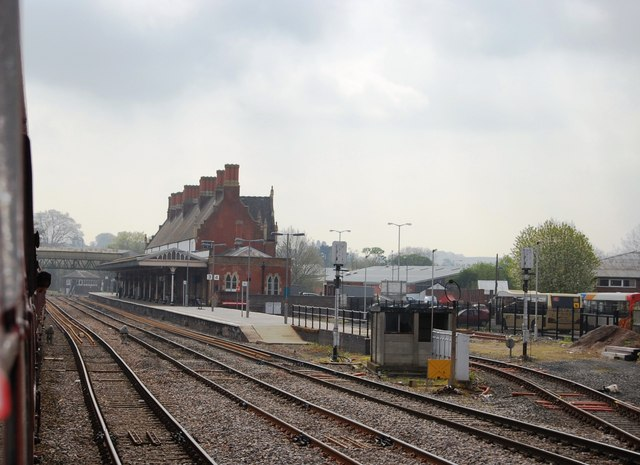
From a train approaching Hereford station

At Hereford, the Hereford Ross and Gloucester Railway was nearing completion; it was a broad gauge line engineered by Isambard Kingdom Brunel; there was also the Newport, Abergavenny and Hereford line; this had originally established friendly relations with the S&HR, but now that it was nearing completion of its construction, it was delaying finalising any formal agreement for arrangements at Hereford until it was clear that the LNWR would reach Hereford from Worcester.

In 1860 the West Midland Railway was formed; the constituent company was the Oxford, Worcester and Wolverhampton Railway: the Newport, Abergavenny and Hereford Railway and the Worcester and Hereford Railway were considered to be absorbed by it, the combined company changing its name to the West Midland Railway. The Shrewsbury and Hereford Railway was given running powers over the former NA&HR lines, and the West Midland company had running powers over the S&HR lines.

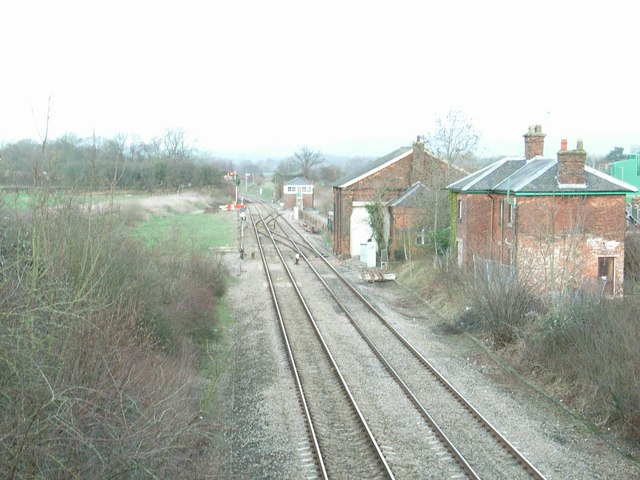
The site of the closed Woofferton station

The S&HR was dismayed by the increasing domination of the district of the Great Western Railway, which it feared would use its power to harm the S&HR. The little company opened discussions with the LNWR, which sought access to South Wales. The LNWR at once offered to lease the line on good terms, at 6%, but in a spirit of openness asked that the GWR be invited to join in the arrangement. The GWR reacted violently against the proposal. The S&HR had running powers over the NA&HR, and any lease of the S&HR by the LNWR would give the LNWR those running powers, and therefore access to South Wales, something the GWR hoped to avoid at all costs. The LNWR therefore submitted a bill to authorise the lease of the S&HR in its name alone, but allowing for the GWR to share in the lease if it changed its view. Although this was a decent offer, the GWR fought strenuously in Parliament against the proposal, but lost thoroughly in committee. When it was clear that the game was up, the GWR agreed to share in the lease with the LNWR.

Shrewsbury and Hereford Railway (Leasing) Act 1862
- Act of Parliament
- Parliament of the United Kingdom
- Long title: An Act to enable the Shrewsbury and Hereford Railway Company to lease their Undertaking, to acquire additional Lands; and for other Purposes.
- Citation: 25 & 26 Vict. c. cxcviii

Dates
- Royal assent: 29 July 1862

Text of statute as originally enacted

From 1 July 1862 the S&HR was leased jointly, half by the LNWR and half by the GWR and West Midland Railway together. This was authorised by the Shrewsbury and Hereford Railway (Leasing) Act 1862 (25 & 26 Vict. c. cxcviii). Although the West Midland Railway was to amalgamate with the GWR, this had not yet been given effect.

== The Hereford Curve ==
The S&HR had used Barr's Court station from the outset, and the Newport, Abergavenny and Hereford Railway used the separate Barton station, and through running from there on to the S&HR was possible. Barr's Court station was considered to be much superior, and a connection line south of Hereford was conceived, to enable through running from the NA&HR into Barr's Court. This was known as the Hereford Curve, and it opened for goods traffic on 23 July 1866, and to passengers on 1 August 1866. Through passenger trains from Newport to Shrewsbury could now use Barr's Court station without reversal.

== Doubling the line ==
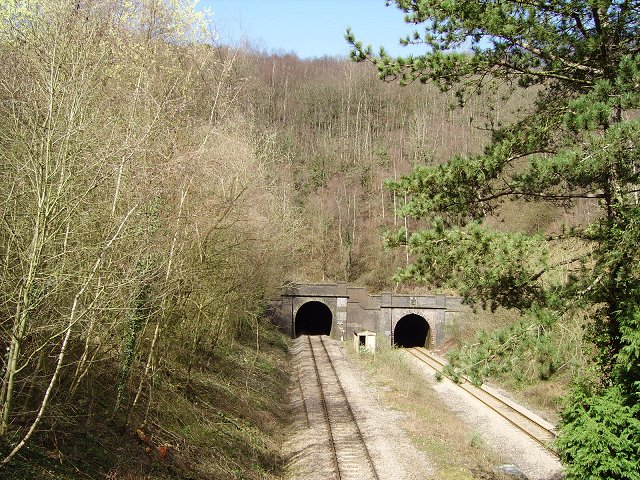
Dinmore Hill Tunnels after doubling

The line had originally been double track from Shrewsbury to Ludlow, and the remainder single. The latter part of the line was doubled in 1893. The tunnel at Dinmore had been constructed as a single bore, and a second bore was driven to enable the doubling.

== North and West Line ==
So-called North and West passenger express trains were introduced, running from the north-west of England via Crewe or Chester to Bristol and the south-west of England, using the S&HR line.

Pearson wrote in 1932:

It was not until 1888 that the "North and West" expresses of the London and North Western and Great Western Railways were introduced, coincidentally with the opening of the Severn Tunnel, the Shrewsbury and Hereford line, thus attaining for the first time the dignity of a main line of first-rank importance...

== Acquisition by the LNWR and GWR ==
The Shrewsbury and Hereford Railway had been leased jointly by the LNWR and the GWR jointly. From time to time those companies pressed for actual acquisition of the line, and this was finally agreed to. The London and North-western Railway (Additional Powers) Act 1870 (33 & 34 Vict. c. cxii) authorised it: from 1 August 1870 the line was the joint property of the LNWR and GWR. Under the act, whilst the railway was directly vested in the LNWR and GWR, the Shrewsbury and Hereford Railway Company continued in existence to pay 6% dividends to the shareholders. (Note: Rake correctly states that the lessees (the LNWR and the GWR) jointly acquired the undertaking of the Shrewsbury and Hereford Railway. Grant does not refer to this and says that "the Company remained independent until the Grouping", but none of the following, which trace the immediate aftermath of 1923, refers to this: D. C. Robinson, Railway Amalgamation in Great Britain, 1923, table IV; Nock, History of the Great Western Railway, 1923 to 1947; Semmens, A History of the Great Western Railway: 1: Consolidation, 1923 to 1929, table 2; Wragg, LMS Handbook: the London Midland and Scottish Railway, 1923 to 1947.)

== Passenger train service ==
The passenger service recorded in Bradshaw in 1895 is not heavy; there were four express trains marked "North and West Express", as well as four semi-fast trains, one of them marked "L&NW train". There were five stopping trains. The North and West Expresses generally divided and combined at Pontypool, with a portion for the South Wales main line and a portion for Bristol. On Sundays there were one night-time "North and West Express", one L&NW train and one stopping train.

Semmens wrote:

On the North-to-West route... there were six southbound [express] trains every week-day in 1922. All except one of these were timed to take 67 minutes over the fifty and three-quarter miles to Hereford... By 1939 the number of through services on ordinary week-days had decreased by one, but there were no less than thirteen on a Saturday, plus another four to Cardiff...

By 1960 the summer Saturday service had grown in intensity, in addition to the routine service. There were seven southbound Friday night trains: Manchester to Newquay, Manchester to Paignton, Manchester to Penzance, Manchester to Paignton, Liverpool and Manchester to Penzance, Glasgow to Plymouth, and Liverpool and Manchester to Cardiff. There were thirteen long-distance day trains.

After the Beeching reforms cross-country services to the south-west of England were redirected to all run via Birmingham New Street, where they could pick up a larger amount of traffic, and the usage of the old Shrewsbury & Hereford railway declined.

== Branches ==
The S&HR had two branch lines.

=== Tenbury Railway ===
A line from Woofferton to Tenbury Wells opened in 1861; it was five miles (8 km) long. It closed in 1961.

=== Ludlow and Clee Hill Railway ===
Ludlow and Clee Hill Railway Act 1861
- Act of Parliament
- Parliament of the United Kingdom
- Long title: An Act for making a Railway to be called "The Ludlow and Clee Hill Railway," and for other Purposes.
- Citation: 24 & 25 Vict. c. clxxxvii

Dates
- Royal assent: 22 July 1861

A mineral line from Ludlow to Bitterley opened on 24 August 1864; it too was five miles (8 km) long. From Bitterley a cable-worked incline one and a quarter miles (2 km) long ascended Titterstone Clee Hill to a summit at Titterstone Quarry where there was a valuable granite deposit. The Bitterley branch never had a passenger service.

== Location list ==
=== Main line ===
- Shrewsbury; joint station; opened for Shrewsbury and Chester Railway 1 June 1849; still open;
- Condover; opened 21 April 1852; closed 9 June 1958;
- Dorrington; opened 21 April 1852; closed 9 June 1958;
- Leebotwood; opened 21 April 1852; closed 9 June 1958;
- All Stretton Halt; opened 29 February 1936; closed 4 January 1943; reopened 6 May 1946; closed 9 June 1958;
- Church Stretton; opened 21 April 1852; relocated 23 May 1914; still open;
- Little Stretton Halt; opened 18 April 1935; closed 4 January 1943; reopened 6 May 1946; closed 9 June 1958;
- Marshbrook; opened 21 April 1852; closed 9 June 1958;
- Marsh Farm Junction; convergence of Wellington to Craven Arms Railway (Wenlock Railway): GWR 1867 - 1951;
- Wistanstow Halt; opened 7 May 1934; closed 11 June 1956;
- Bishops Castle Junction; convergence of Bishops Castle Railway 1865 – 1935;
- Craven Arms; opened 21 April 1852; still open;
- Central Wales Junction; divergence of the Central Wales Line 1860 -;
- Onibury; opened 21 April 1852; closed 9 June 1958;
- Bromfield; opened 21 April 1852; regular services closed 9 June 1958; completely closed 1965;
- Ludlow; opened 21 April 1852; still open; convergence of Ludlow and Clee Hill Joint Line 1864 – 1962;
- Ashford Bowdler; opened December 1854; closed 1 November 1855;
- Woofferton; opened 6 December 1853; closed 31 July 1961;convergence of Tenbury Railway Joint 1864 – 1961;
- Berrington and Eye; opened 6 December 1853; closed 9 June 1958;
- Kington Junction; convergence of Leominster and Kington Railway 1857 – 1964;
- Leominster; opened 6 December 1853; still open; divergence of Bromyard branch GWR; 1884 – 1952;
- Ford Bridge; opened September 1854; closed 5 April 1954;
- Dinmore; opened 6 December 1853; closed 9 June 1958;
- Moreton-on-Lugg; opened 6 December 1853; closed 9 June 1958;
- Shelwick Junction; convergence of Worcester and Hereford Railway 1861 – ;
- Barrs Court Junction; divergence of NA&H line;
- Brecon Curve Junction; convergence of line from Barton;
- Hereford [Barrs Court]; opened 6 December 1853; still open.

== Gradients ==
The northern part of the line was not easy for enginemen in the days of steam. The summit was just south of Church Stretton. Leaving Shrewsbury there is a climb of thirteen miles (21 km) to the summit, with gradients up to 1 in 100. Approaching from the south, the climb is about the same length, with gradients up to 1 in 92 and a punishing final two miles (3.2 km) at 1 in 112.
