= Tenbury and Bewdley Railway =

Dismantled English railway

Tenbury and Bewdley railway
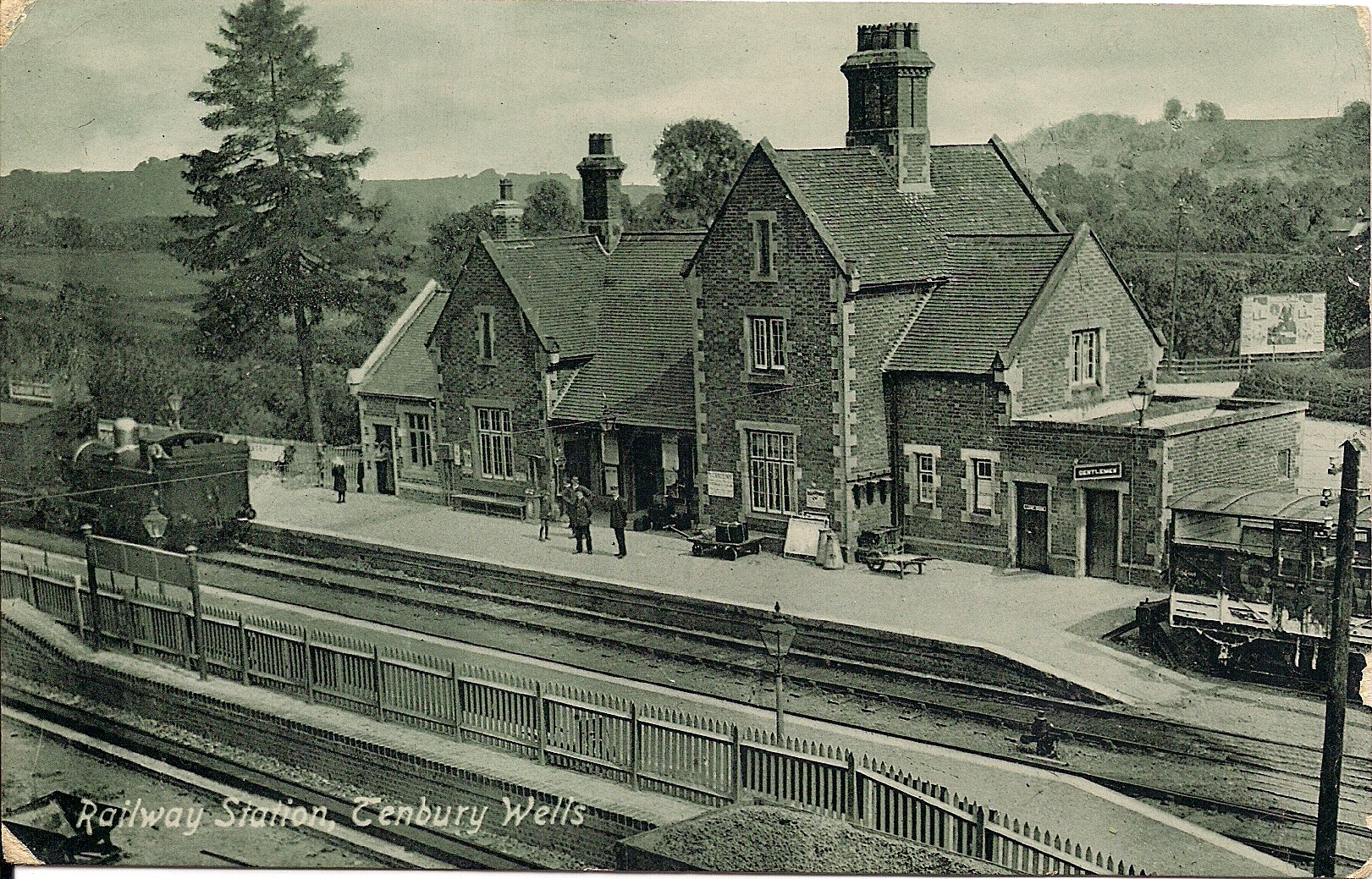
- Tenbury Wells railway station in 1916

Overview
- Other name: Wyre Forest line or Tenbury Line
- Status: Dismantled
- Locale: Worcestershire and Shropshire
- Termini: Bewdley; Tenbury Wells
- Former connections: Severn Valley railway, Cleobury Mortimer and Ditton Priors light railway, Tenbury railway.
- Stations: 6

Service
- Operator(s): West Midland Railway, then the Great Western Railway, then British Railways

History
- Opened: 13 August 1864
- Closed: 8 May 1965

Technical
- Line length: 15 mi (24 km)
- Number of tracks: Single track.
- Track gauge: 4 ft 8 1/2 in (1,435 mm) standard gauge
- Signalling: Train staff system, then token.

The Tenbury and Bewdley Railway (T&B) was an English railway company that built its single-track standard-gauge line from Bewdley to Tenbury Wells between 1860 and 1864. The line connected the Severn Valley Railway at Bewdley with the Tenbury Railway at Tenbury, which continued to Woofferton. The Tenbury and Bewdley railway and the Tenbury railway were sometimes collectively referred to as the Wyre Forest line or simply the Tenbury Line. The railway was operated from opening by the West Midland Railway, then by the Great Western Railway, then by British Railways until closure.

The line closed to passenger trains in 1962 and to goods traffic in 1965; the tracks, sleepers and some infrastructure were subsequently dismantled and removed in 1966 after 101 years of operation. There is now no railway activity on most of the former line, but its trackbed is still extant in sections, particularly where it forms part of National Cycle Route 45 through the Wyre Forest.

== Conception ==
The Shrewsbury and Hereford Railway opened its line on 6 December 1852. Tenbury was a little over five miles from Woofferton station, which opened on that line at the same time, and a branch line was planned between the two: it opened on 1 August 1861 as the Tenbury Railway. While the branch line between Woofferton and Tenbury was under construction, there was enthusiasm to extend the line from Tenbury to Bewdley, where it would connect with the then-under-construction Severn Valley Railway. There were two immediate problems, gathering enough money to pay the parliamentary deposit, and heading off the suspected hostility of the Shrewsbury and Hereford Railway. The former was resolved by getting a £9,600 bank loan.

Tenbury and Bewdley Railway Act 1860
- Act of Parliament
- Parliament of the United Kingdom
- Long title: An Act for making a Railway from Tenbury in the County of Worcester to the Severn Valley Railway near Bewdley in the County of Worcester.
- Citation: 23 & 24 Vict. c. cxxviii

Dates
- Royal assent: 3 July 1860

The bill for the proposed Tenbury and Bewdley Railway went to Parliament in the 1860 session; the S&HR did indeed oppose it, but their opposition was overcome, and the Tenbury and Bewdley Railway Act 1860 (23 & 24 Vict. c. cxxviii) was given royal assent on 3 July 1860; capital was to be £120,000. The line would run from a junction with the Tenbury Railway, at Tenbury, to a junction with the Severn Valley Railway at Bewdley, as planned. Around this time, the Shrewsbury and Hereford Railway amalgamated with others to form the West Midland Railway, which would later operate the Tenbury and Bewdley.

== Construction and railway politics ==
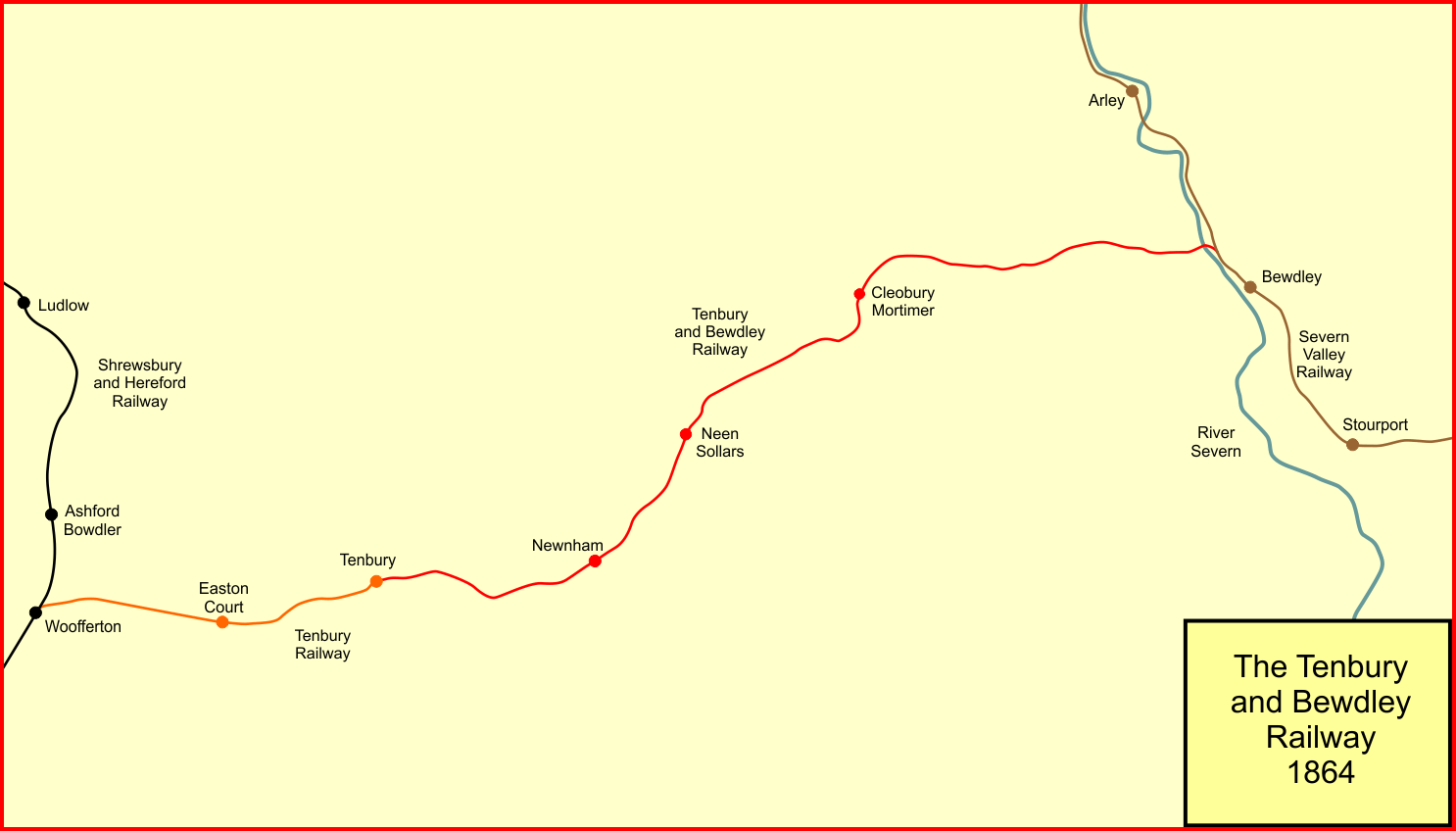
The Tenbury and Bewdley Railway (illustrated in red to the right) and Tenbury Railway (illustrated in orange to the left). The minor station of Wyre Forest is not included in this diagram. It is located between Bewdley and Cleobury Mortimer.

David Wylie was appointed engineer in July 1860 and Brassey and Field were appointed contractors in August 1960, the same parties already being engaged in construction of the Tenbury Railway at the time. A working arrangement with the West Midland Railway was concluded, by which the Tenbury and Bewdley Railway Company would receive 40% of gross receipts, after payment of interest on the borrowings. However the company was unable to raise the money to pay its contractor for the construction, and there was a protracted delay. Eventually in October 1861 instructions were given to commence work. In September 1862 the Shareholders were informed that arrangements had been made to lease the line to the West Midland Railway, giving a dividend of 4% after the first three years.

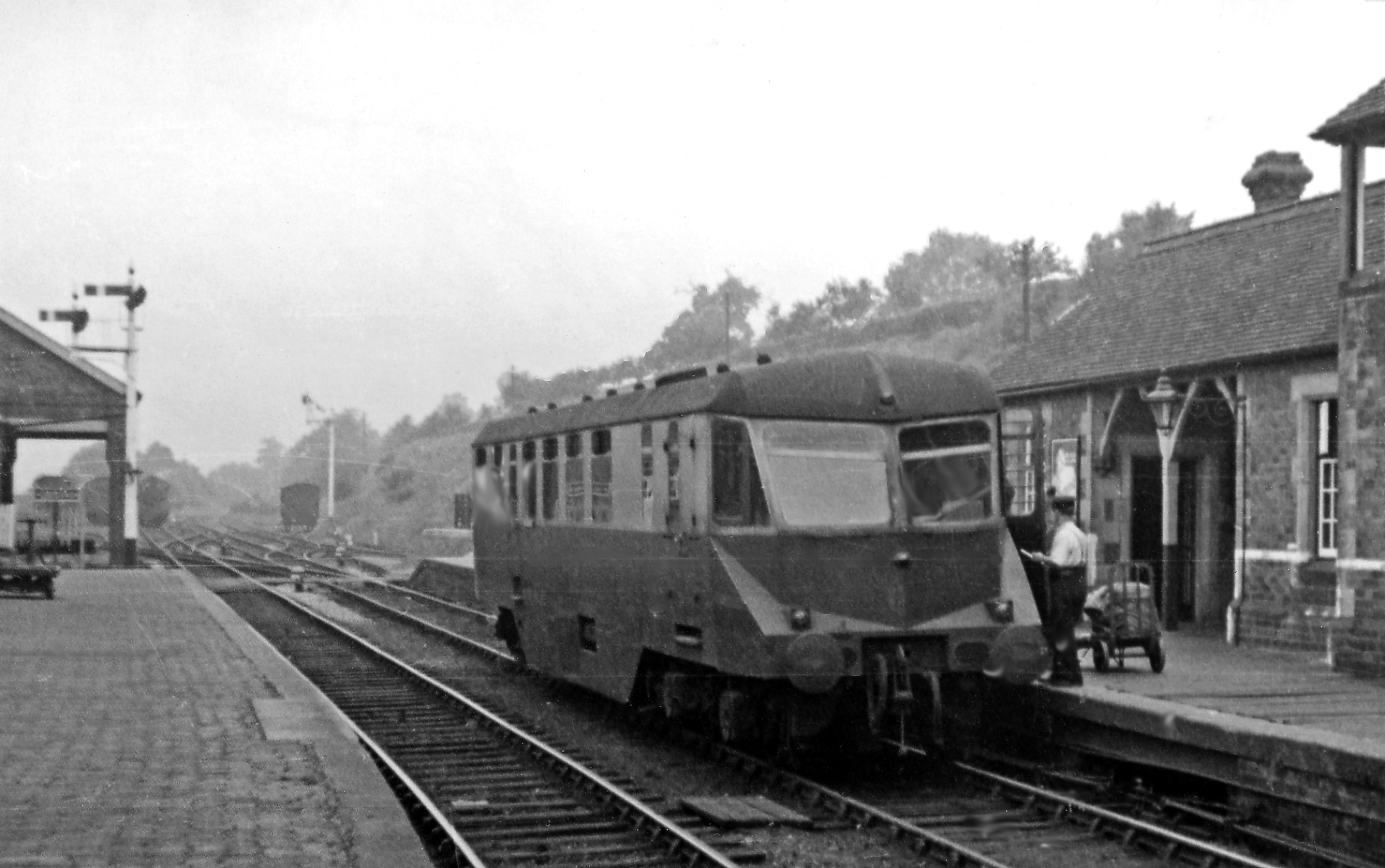
Tenbury Wells Station, with ex-Great Western Diesel railcar in 1949

The main line at Woofferton (the former Shrewsbury and Hereford Railway) had by then been leased jointly to the London and North Western Railway (50%) and the Great Western Railway and the West Midland Railway (together 50%). The Tenbury branch was carried into the joint line status; the lease took effect on 1 July 1862, while construction was progressing on the Tenbury and Bewdley. David Wylie died unexpectedly in early 1863, with his role being assumed by his former assistant William Clarke.

=== Opening ===
After the completion of construction, just as the line was being readied to open in June 1864, a serious landslip in Prizeley cutting took place, and the planned opening had to be postponed. The earthwork was stabilised, and a ceremonial opening took place a month later on 4 August 1864, although the line had not yet been approved for passenger operation. This would occur on 9 August 1864, when Captain Tyler of the Board of Trade visited the line and gave his consent to the opening of the line for passenger trains. The line opened fully on 13 August 1864. (Note: Probably another ceremonial opening, followed by a public opening on 14 August 1864.)

=== Bewdley to Kidderminster loop line ===
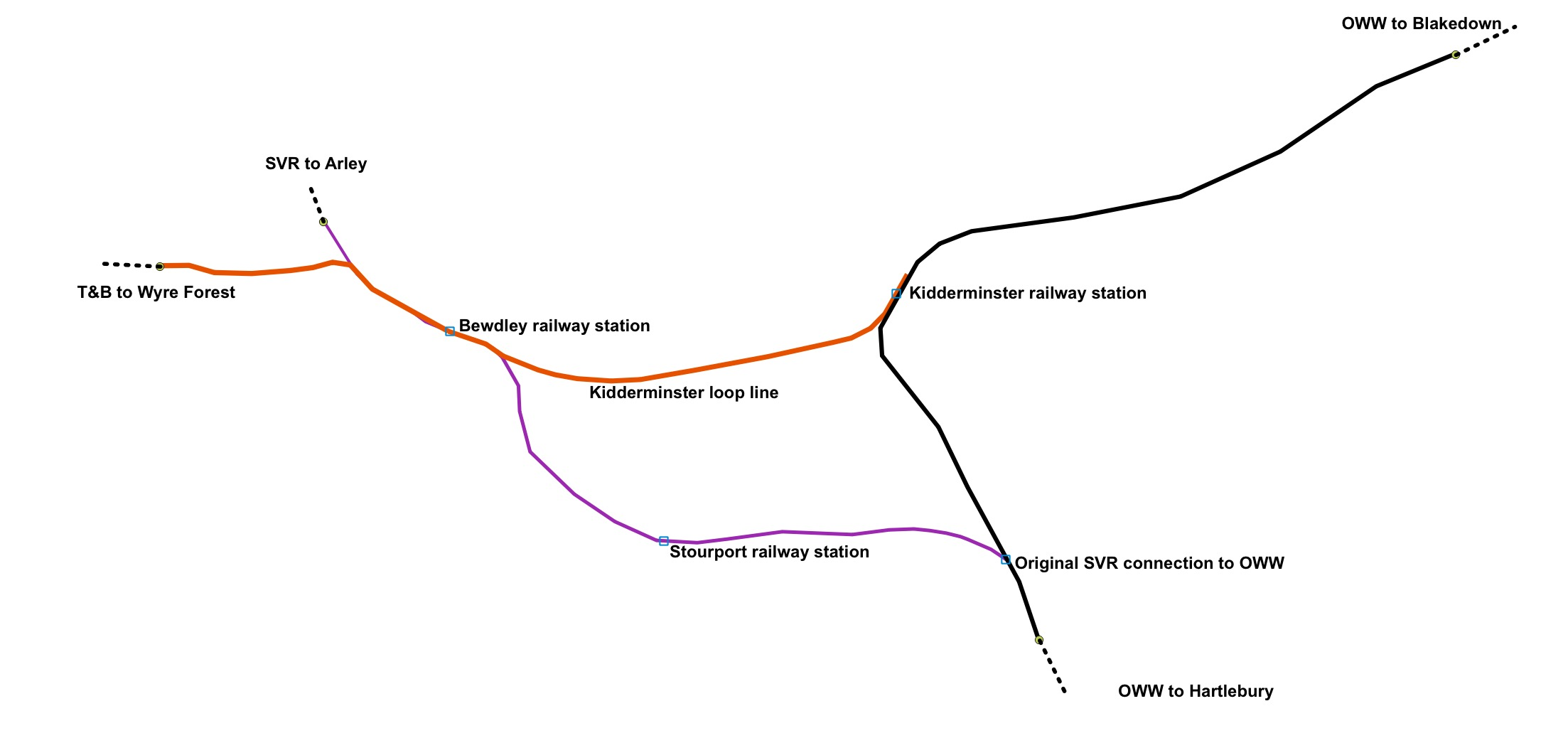
The Kidderminster loop line and continued T&B (depicted in orange) and its connections to the surrounding railways (SVR in purple, OWW in black)

After the Tenbury and Bewdley railway was completed, there were lots of passengers travelling between stations on the line and Birmingham. The route to Birmingham, which included a portion of the Severn Valley Railway, connected to the line to Birmingham (The Oxford Worcester and Wolverhampton railway (OWW)) at a point near Hartlebury station. This was a roundabout way, as the distance between the SVR and the OWW to Birmingham was shorter between Bewdley and Kidderminster, and if a line was built, these trains would no longer be required to reverse at Hartlebury, simplifying operations. The travel time between the Tenbury and Bewdley line and Birmingham could therefore be reduced if a relatively small railway of three miles was constructed between Bewdley and Kidderminster. This was referred to as the Bewdley Curve, Bewdley Loop, Kidderminster loop or Kidderminster loop line. After much hesitation by the GWR due to high costs and their ongoing amalgamation with the West Midland Railway, the line was eventually opened on 1 June 1878 and enabled trains from the Tenbury direction to run direct towards Kidderminster, for Birmingham. This line is now preserved as part of the modern day Severn Valley Railway, despite being constructed 16 years after the rest of the preserved line.

=== Transfer to the GWR ===
From 1 January 1869, the lease of the Tenbury branch was converted to outright ownership by the LNWR and GWR, under an agreement of 1 December 1868. A year after this, The Tenbury and Bewdley Railway company was transferred to the ownership of the Great Western Railway from 1 February 1870.

== Operation ==
The passenger train service on the line varied little over the 101 years in which the line was operational. In 1895, there were four trains daily (apart from Sundays) between Bewdley and Woofferton, with an additional two on the Tenbury to Woofferton section. By 1910 this had changed to five and four respectively, remaining similar from 1922 to 1962, when the line was closed to passengers.

=== Route ===
From Bewdley, the line ran north on a single-track line alongside the Severn Valley Railway for a distance of about a mile, before diverging to the west to cross the River Severn using Dowles Bridge (52.3855°N 2.3249°W). It then followed the valley of Dowles Brook through the Wyre Forest until Wyre Forest station. The site of the first passing loop after Bewdley was at Cleobury Mortimer, where connection to the Cleobury Mortimer and Ditton Priors Light Railway could be made. The next station was Neen Sollars, a mirror of Cleobury Mortimer station when built. After this, Newnham Bridge. Between Newnham Bridge and Woofferton, the railway was partially built along the bed of the disused Leominster Canal, and crossed the River Teme by way of a bridge north of the earlier canal aqueduct. The T&B then joined the Welsh Marches line at Woofferton railway station, where its trains usually terminated in the bay platform then present.

=== Freight ===
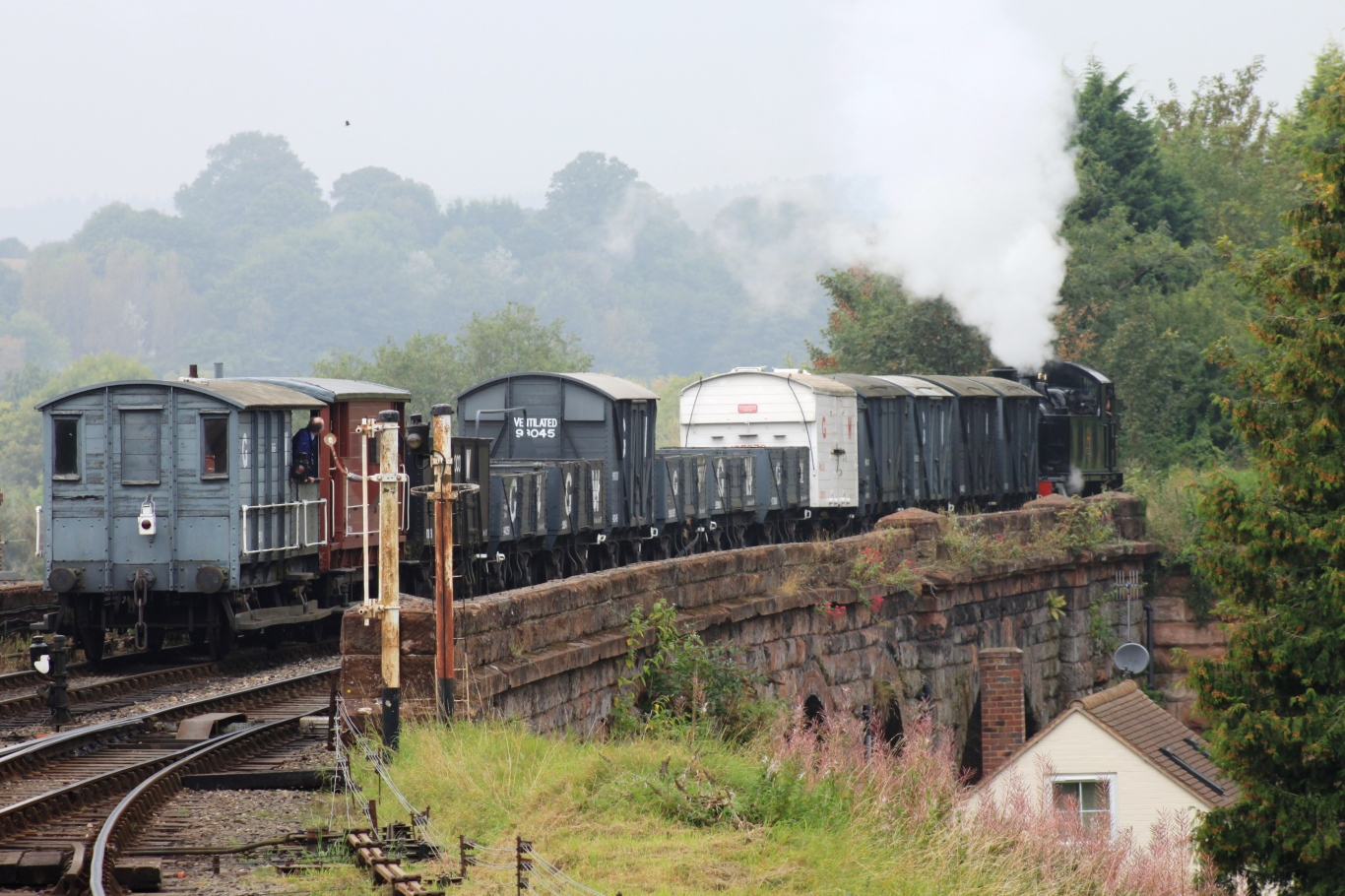
A demonstration freight train on the connecting Severn Valley Railway. Freight on the Tenbury and Bewdley would have appeared very similar to this when traveling on the line.

For most of its operating life, freight was the primary source of revenue on the Tenbury and Bewdley.

Freight on the line was primarily agricultural, and therefore could be highly seasonal. Large amounts of traffic were generated by hop and cherry farming out of Newnham Bridge and Tenbury Wells, as the harvest was transported by rail across the country. Both stations maintained large goods yards and covered storage sheds for that purpose. The cattle market at Tenbury also created traffic for the railway, as such, cattle were a large source of freight on the line, especially in the late 1800s. After 1941, military traffic was also present on the railway following the opening of RNAD Ditton Priors, usually traveling across the T&B from Bewdley to Cleobury Mortimer crossing onto the branch to Ditton Priors where the depot was located.

=== Operating companies ===
From opening in 1864, the Tenbury and Bewdley was operated by the West Midland Railway, which amalgamated with the Great Western Railway in 1869. Hence, the Tenbury and Bewdley Railway was operated by the GWR from 1869 until nationalisation in 1948, after which it was operated by British Railways until closure in 1965.

=== Stations ===
Station Name	Opened	Closed	Notes
Tenbury	1 August 1861	1 August 1962	Renamed Tenbury Wells 1912
Newnham	13 August 1864	1 August 1962	Renamed Newnham Bridge 1873
Neen Sollars	13 August 1864	1 August 1962	
Cleobury Mortimer	13 August 1864	1 August 1962	
Wyre Forest	1 June 1869	1 August 1962	
Bewdley	1 February 1862	5 January 1970	Later reopened as part of the Severn Valley Railway heritage line.

== Cleobury Mortimer and Ditton Priors Light Railway ==
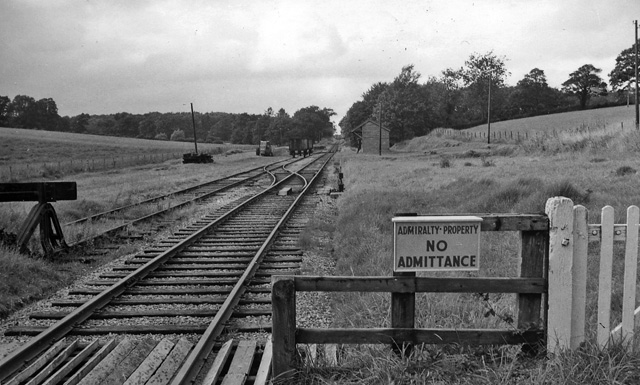
The view northward from Burwarton Halt towards Ditton Priors on the Cleobury Mortimer and Ditton Priors Light Railway.

The Cleobury Mortimer and Ditton Priors Light Railway (CM&DPLR) was authorised under a light railway order, the Cleobury Mortimer and Ditton Priors Light Railway Order 1901, on 23 March 1901. It was to build a line from a junction with the Tenbury and Bewdley Railway at Cleobury Mortimer. After considerable delay, the line was opened to goods traffic on 19 July 1908, passenger trains following on 21 November 1908.

For some years the Cleobury Mortimer and Ditton Priors Railway was simply a rural branch line; its passenger service ceased in 1938 after being unremunerative for most of its existence. The increasing international tension following the Munich crisis of 1938 resulted, among other things, in a search for sites for the storage of naval ordnance. A site at Ditton Priors was considered to be suitable, and preparations were made to construct what became the Royal Naval Armaments Depot, Ditton Priors. It opened in 1940, and the majority of the traffic proceeded to move by rail.

The site eventually extended over a very considerable area. The development brought much goods traffic to the CM&DPLR and therefore the Tenbury and Bewdley railway. At the end of World War II the depot was used for decommissioned armaments. In 1955 the branch line was transferred to the ownership of the Ministry of Defence (Admiralty) for £40,000. In 1960 the CM&DPLR was closed, but the Royal Navy continued to use the depot as a non-rail-connected base until 1965.

== Decline and closure ==
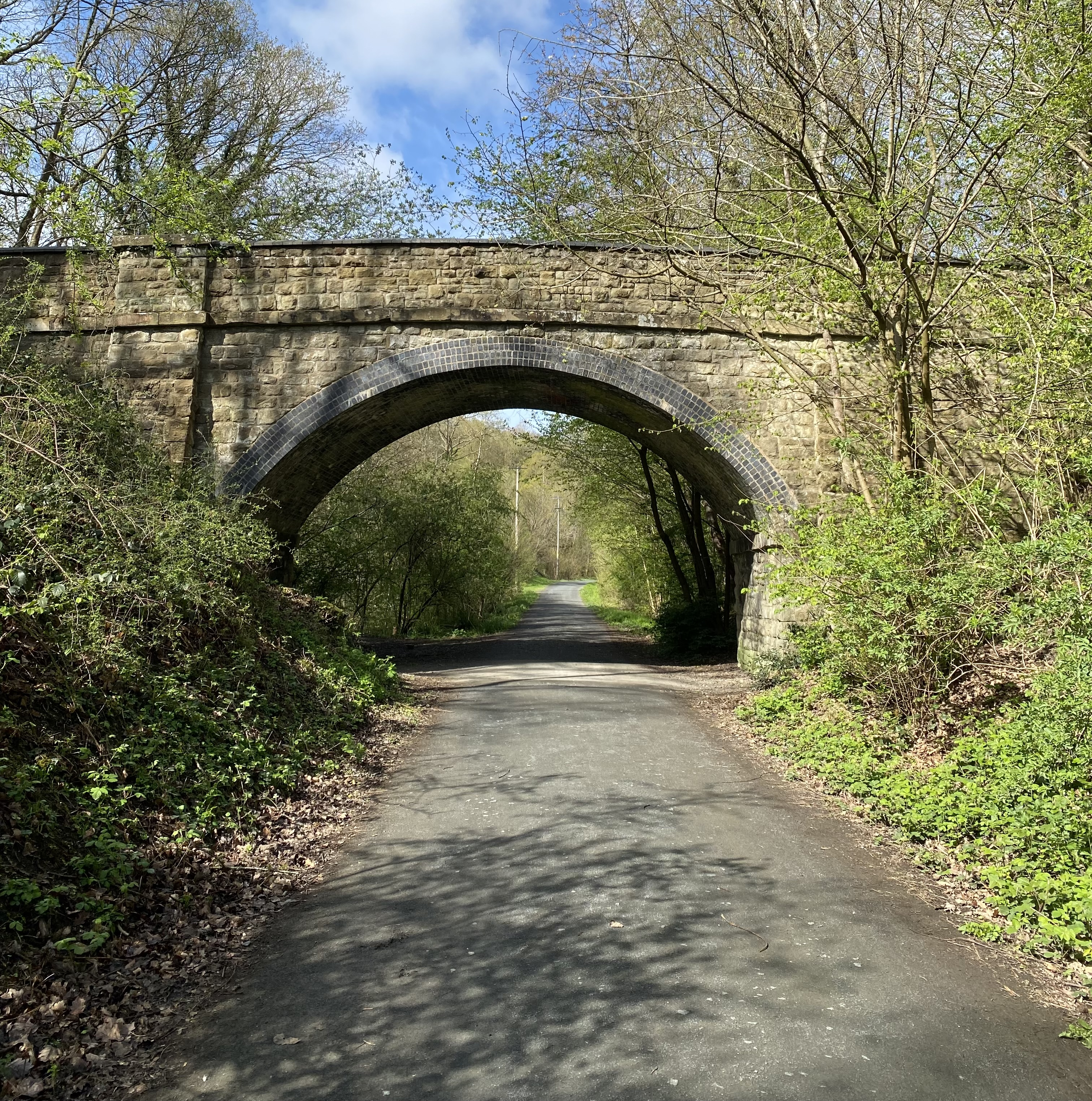
The trackbed of the Tenbury and Bewdley Railway in the Wyre Forest. The bridge pictured was constructed across the railway, but now spans National Cycle Route 45, which occupies this part of the trackbed.

In 1948, after WW2, the then owner/operator of the Tenbury and Bewdley, the GWR, was amalgamated with the other "big four" railway companies to become British Railways, which assumed ownership of the line. Running up to the 1960s, the rural nature of the Tenbury and Bewdley line resulted in a steep decline in passenger and freight business as roads were constructed which duplicated the line and reliable road transport developed. It became plain to British Railways that the line was not making a profit. Due to the financial and political state of British Railways at the time (closing, dismantling and selling the land from lines that did not, by themselves, turn a profit), closure was proposed in 1960. A case was made against the closure concerning the hardship that it would cause to the locals served by it, especially to schoolchildren who relied on the trains, and to one family who relied on the trains to deliver their drinking water.

Despite this, the decision was taken to close the Tenbury line from Tenbury Wells to Woofferton completely from 31 July 1961, severing the Tenbury and Bewdley from its connection with the Shrewsbury to Hereford mainline, and therefore the overall British mainline network at one end. The final train to run along the full length of both the Tenbury and Bewdley railway and the Tenbury branch (from Bewdley to Woofferton) in 1961 carried a headboard that commemorated the 100th anniversary of the line, reading: "Special Last Train 1861-1961". After this closure: one passenger train each way daily would then run from Kidderminster via Bewdley to Tenbury Wells on the then-remaining section of the line for a trial period of one year, at times suitable for the schools. In fact, the experimental service for schoolchildren started during the school holidays. This inauspicious start was followed by minimal use of the trains, leading to the decision being made to discontinue them, closing the entire line to passenger use; the closure took place on 1 August 1962, a Wednesday.

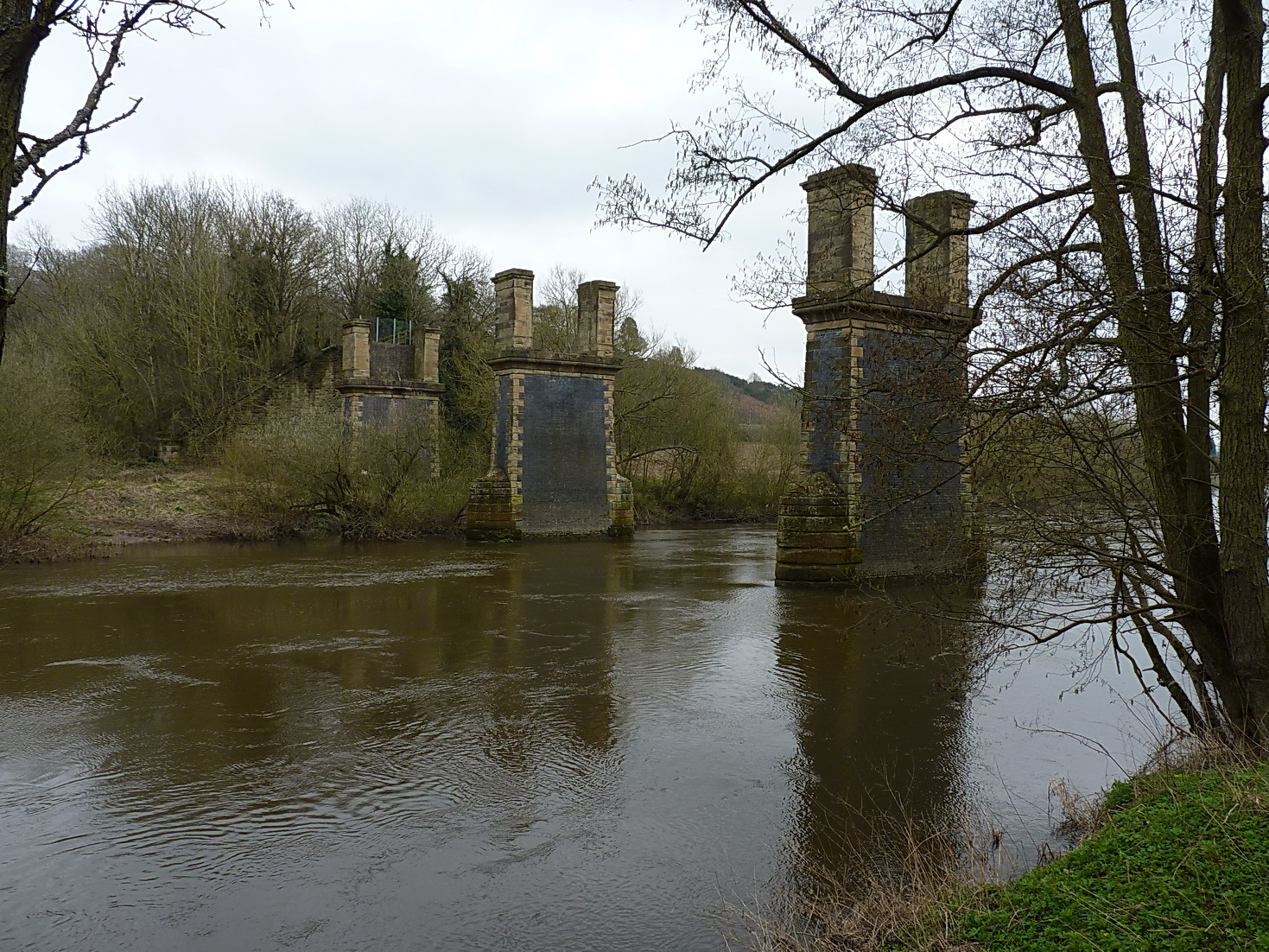
The remains of Dowles Bridge. The rails were supported by iron lattices which spanned the stone columns pictured, the spans were removed on closure of the line.

After closure to passengers, a goods service was retained on the branch along its length between Tenbury and Bewdley. Both passenger and goods traffic were further depleted during this time, as the line now only connected at one end (following the full closure and lifting of the Tenbury Branch on 12 November 1961). The goods service to Tenbury was withdrawn on 6 January 1964. The goods service to Cleobury Mortimer and Ditton Priors continued, due to the presence of RNAD Ditton Priors requiring the line to be used for military traffic. During this time, the remainder of the line (that not being used by the aforementioned military traffic) between Cleobury and Tenbury was used as a very long siding for the storage of over one thousand redundant goods wagons. After the severance of the military depot from the railway, and the removal of the goods wagons, on Good Friday, 16 April 1965, the line between Bewdley and Tenbury was closed and only dismantling traffic continued to use the line. In March 1966, with lifting of all other track completed, the spans of Dowles Bridge were dismantled, despite local outcry, leaving only the supports standing in the River Severn.

=== Current state of the line ===
As of April 2025, much of the Tenbury and Bewdley railway's trackbed is fading back into the countryside, no indication of railway activity is present on much of the line, though some embankments, stations, viaducts and bridges survive. Today, the original branch off of the Severn Valley Railway is used as a siding to a point shortly outside of Bewdley station, though Bewdley station is signalled as if the line were fully intact. The supports of Dowles Bridge remain standing in the River Severn; the trackbed is walkable for a few miles between Dowles Road (shortly after Dowles Bridge) and an edge of the Wyre Forest, as part of the Mercian Way; and the stations of Wyre Forest, Cleobury Mortimer, Neen Sollars and Newnham Bridge are extant as private residences, with Bewdley the only station still seeing railway activity, preserved as part of the Severn Valley Railway. Tenbury Wells railway station was demolished, and the site is now used for various industrial purposes.

== Bibliography ==
- Beddoes, Keith; Smith, William H. (1995). The Tenbury & Bewdley Railway. Wild Swan Publications. ISBN 1-874103-27-5.
