= List of twisted spires =

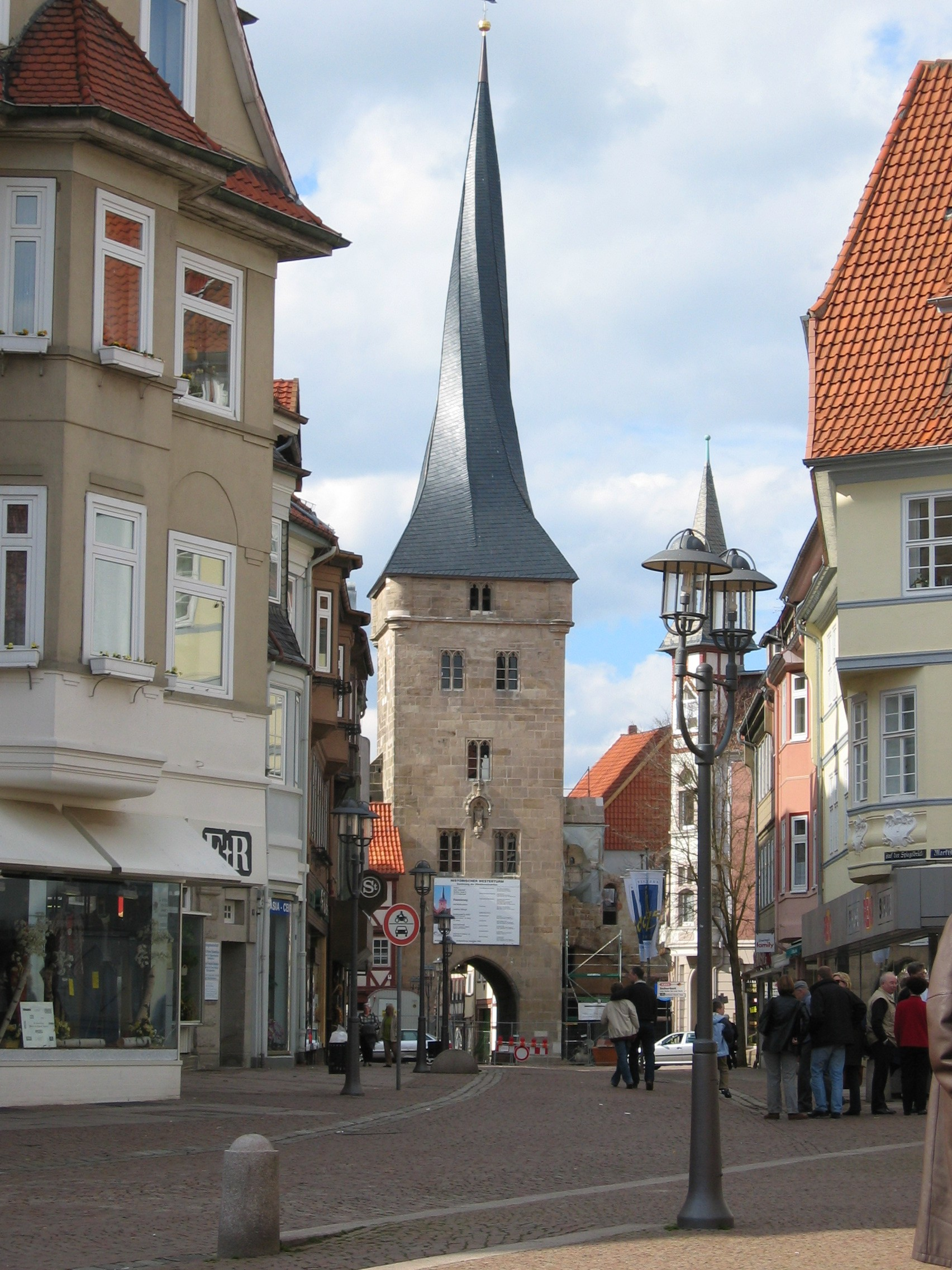
A designed twist in the spire of old western town gate of Duderstadt in Germany

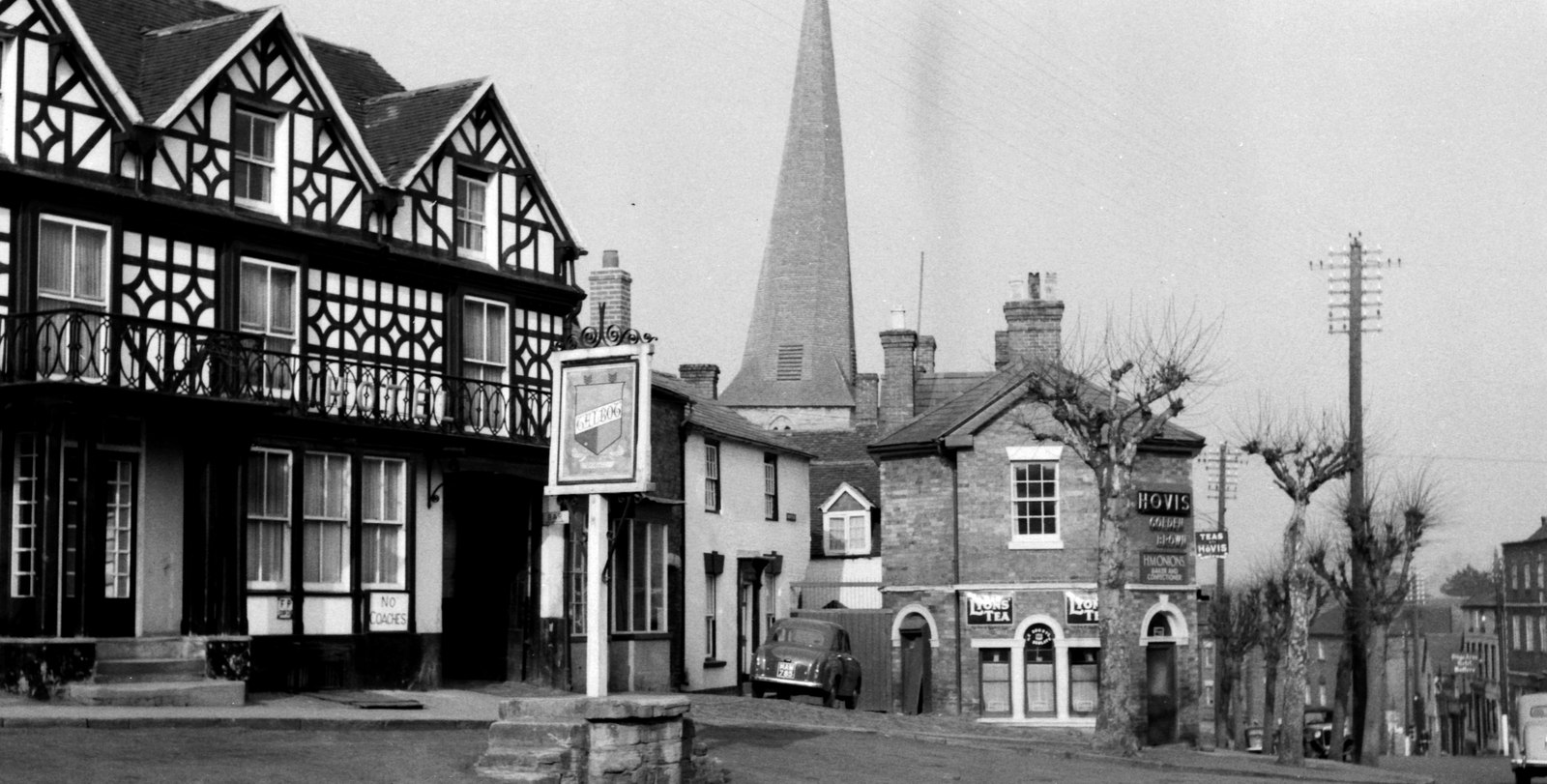
An unintended crooked spire on St Mary's Church in England

A crooked spire (also known as a twisted spire) is a tower that, through accident or design, contains a twist or does not point perfectly straight upwards. There are about a hundred bell towers of this type in Europe.

== Austria ==
- Alpbach, Tyrol – Saint Oswald
- Bad Ischl, Upper Austria – Saint Nicholas
- Mayrhofen, Tyrol – church
- Oetz, Imst – Saints George & Nicholas
- Virgen, Lienz – church
- Wagrain, St. Johann im Pongau District – Saint Rupert
- Zell am Ziller, Schwaz – Saint Guy

== Belgium ==
- Baelen, Liège – Saint Paul
- Herve, Liège Province – Saint John the Baptist
- Jalhay, Liège Province – Saint Michael
- Jodoigne, Walloon Brabant – Chapel of Notre Dame du Marche
- Lierneux, Liège Province – church
- Limbourg, Liège Province – Saint Lambert
- Leernes, Hainaut Province – Saint Martin
- Marchin, Liège Province – parish church
- Polleur, Theux – Saint Jacques
- Roosdaal, Flemish Brabant – 13th century
- Sart-lez-Spa, Jalhay – Saint Lambert
- Verlaine, Liège Province – Saint Remy

== Canada ==
- Clarke's Head, Newfoundland and Labrador – Christ Church

== Denmark ==
- Copenhagen – Stock Exchange
- Copenhagen – Church of Our Saviour

== England ==
- Barnstaple, Devon – St. Peter's church
- Chesterfield, Derbyshire – Church of St Mary and All Saints
- Cleobury Mortimer, Shropshire – St Mary's Church
- Clitheroe, Lancashire – Church of St Mary Magdalene
- Ermington, Devon – Church of St Peter and St Paul
- Ewhurst Green, East Sussex – St James's Church
- Hadleigh, Suffolk – Church of St Mary
- Wolstanton, Staffordshire – St Margaret's Church

== France ==
- Aignay-le-Duc, Côte-d'Or – Saint-Pierre-et-Saint-Paul
- Angiens, Seine-Maritime – church
- Attignat, Ain – Saint Loup
- Aubigny-sur-Nère, Cher – tower
- Auppegard, Seine-Maritime – Church of St. Pierre
- Auxonne, Côte-d'Or – Notre Dame
- Barran, Gers – College of St Jean Baptiste
- Boësses, Loiret – church
- Boulancourt, Seine-et-Marne – Saint Denis
- Bourges, Cher – Bell tower
- Breuvannes-en-Bassigny, Haute-Marne – Saint George
- Bures-en-Bray, Seine-Maritime – Saint Aignan
- Ceyzériat, Ain – Saint Laurent
- Châteauroux, Indre – Lucarne
- Cheffes, Maine-et-Loire – church
- Chemiré-sur-Sarthe, Maine-et-Loire – Church of Saint Jacques
- Courcelles-Chaussy, Lorraine – Tower
- Coussay-les-Bois, Vienne – Saint Martin
- Dinéault, Finistère – Arrow tower
- Distré, Maine-et-Loire – Church of Saint Julien
- Dohis, Aisne – church of the Nativité-de-la-Sainte-Vierge
- Drancy, Seine-Saint-Denis – tower
- Échirolles, Isère – construction on a building
- Étréaupont, Aisne – Saint Martin
- Étoges, Marne – church
- Fontaine-Guérin, Maine-et-Loire – Church of St Martin
- Fougere, Maine-et-Loire – Saint Etienne
- Gigny, Yonne – Saint Leger
- Hectomare, Eure – Saint Taurin
- Houville-la-Branche, Eure-et-Loir – church
- Jarzé, Maine-et-Loire – Saint Cyr et Sainte Julitte
- Javerlhac-et-la-Chapelle-Saint-Robert, Dordogne – Saint Etienne
- Labergement-lès-Seurre, Côte-d'Or – church
- La Tour-d'Auvergne, Auvergne – Saint Pardoux
- Le Vieil-Baugé, Maine-et-Loire – Saint-Symphorien church
- Les Grands-Chézeaux, Haute-Vienne – Lantern on a roof of a house
- Malville, Loire-Atlantique – tower
- Marçon, Pays de la Loire – Church of Notre Dame
- Mervans, Saône-et-Loire – Saint-Maurice
- Meslay-du-Maine, Mayenne – Saint Pierre
- Mouliherne, Maine-et-Loire – Saint Germaine
- Naillat, Limousin – Saint Medard
- Niedermorschwihr, Haut-Rhin – Saint Gall and Saint Weldelin
- Nogent-sur-Vernisson, Loiret – construction on a house
- Nohant-en-Graçay, Cher – Saint Martin
- Offranville, Seine-Maritime – Church of St.Ouen
- Orléans, Loiret – Lantern roof on a house
- Payzac, Dordogne – Church of the Transfigeration
- Plougrescant, Brittany – Saint Gonery
- Pontigné, Maine-et-Loire – St Denis
- Puiseaux, Loiret – Notre Dame
- Québriac, Ille-et-Vilaine – Saint Pierre
- Reugny, Indre-et-Loire – Saint Medard
- Rochechouart, Haute-Vienne – Saint Saviours
- Rodelle, Aveyron – Church of Lagnac
- Saint-Aubin-sur-Gaillon, Eure – Saint Germain
- Saint-Bonnet-de-Four, l'Allier – Saint Bonnet
- Saint-Côme-d'Olt, Aveyron – Saint Come
- Saint-Outrille, Cher – College of Saint-Austrégésile de Saint-Outrille
- Saint-Côme-d'Olt, Aveyron – Church of Saint-Côme-d'Olt
- Saint-Pierre-des-Échaubrognes, Deux-Sèvres – church
- Saint-Viâtre, Loir-et-Cher – Saint Viatre
- Saumur, Maine-et-Loire – Saint Pierre
- Sérignac-sur-Garonne, Lot-et-Garonne – Notre Dame
- Treignac, Corrèze – Chapel of Notre Dame de la Paix
- Troyes, Aube – Saint Remy
- Verchin, Pas-de-Calais – St Omer church
- Vézelise, Meurthe-et-Moselle – Saint Côme et Damien
- Vieil-Baugé, Maine-et-Loire – church
- Vitteaux, Côte-d'Or – Saint Germain

== Germany ==
- Ballstädt, Gotha (district) – church
- Barntrup, North Rhine-Westphalia – church
- Breidenbach, Hesse –
- Burgwedel, Lower Saxony – Saint Pierre
- Delbrück, North Rhine-Westphalia – Saint-Jean-Baptiste
- Duderstadt, Lower Saxony – Town gatehouse
- Düsseldorf, North Rhine-Westphalia – St Lambertus
- Grötzingen, Karlsruhe – Evangelical church
1. Hardthausen am Kocher, Baden-Wuerttemberg – Protestant Church Gochsen
- Hattingen, North Rhine-Westphalia – Saint-Georges
- Kaisersesch, Rhineland-Palatinate – Saint Pancrase
- Lage, Lippe – Saint Peter & Saint Paul
- Lemgo, Lippe – Saint Nicholas
- Lüneburg, Lower Saxony – St John's Church
- Mayen, Rhineland-Palatinate – Church of St Clemens
- Mülheim, North Rhine-Westphalia – Saint Pierre
- Münzenberg, Hesse – church
- Neuwied, Rhineland-Palatinate – Sainte Marguerite
- Northeim, Lower Saxony – Saint Sixt
- Oberwesel, Rhineland-Palatinate – Notre Dame
- Ochsenfurt, Lower Franconia – Maria Schnee
- Porta Westfalica, Minden-Lübbecke – church
- Sandstedt, Lower Saxony – Saint Jean
- Stolzenau, Lower Saxony – Saint Jacques
- Uslar, Lower Saxony – Saint Jean

== Italy ==
- Rome – Sant'Ivo alla Sapienza

== Scotland ==
- Cupar, Fife – Church of Cupar Old and St Michael of Tarvit
- Inverness, – Town Steeple

== Switzerland ==
- Davos, Canton of Grisons – Saint Johann
- Muttenz, Basel-Landschaft – Fortified Church of St. Arbogast
- Payerne, Canton of Vaud – Payerne Priory
- Stein am Rhein, Canton of Schaffhausen – St. George

== United States of America ==
- Setauket, New York – Caroline Church of Brookhaven

== Other crooked or twisted spires ==
- Hobsons Brewery, Shropshire, produces a beer named "Twisted Spire".
- Spire Brewery is named for Chesterfield's landmark twisted spire.
- "Crooked Spire" Pubs exist at Chesterfield and Ermington
- Architects have been inspired to create twisted buildings such as the Turning Torso

== See also ==
- List of twisted buildings
- Crooked spire
- Spire
