= St Mary's Church, Cleobury Mortimer =

Coordinates: 52.3792°N 2.4803°W

- Church of St Mary the Virgin
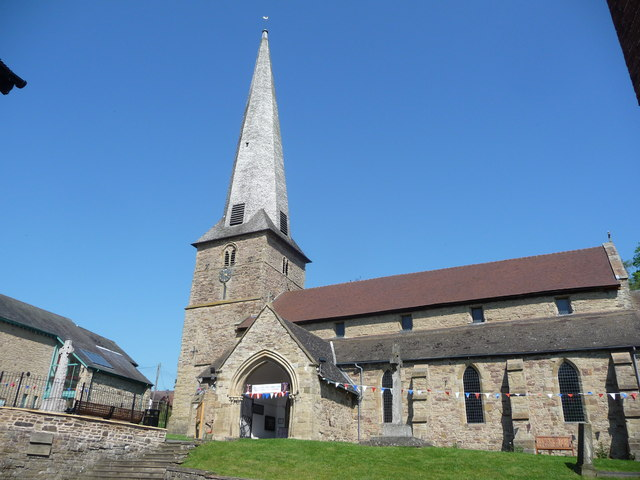
- St Mary's Church, Cleobury Mortimer, from the south

- Location in Shropshire
- OS grid reference: SO 674 758
- Location: Church Street, Cleobury Mortimer, Shropshire
- Country: England
- Denomination: Anglican
- Website: St Mary, Cleobury Mortimer

History
- Status: Parish church

Architecture
- Functional status: Active
- Heritage designation: Grade I
- Designated: 12 November 1954
- Architect(s): Thomas Telford (repairs), George Gilbert Scott (restoration)
- Architectural type: Church
- Style: Norman, Gothic

Specifications
- Materials: Sandstone, tiled roof, shingled spire

Administration
- Province: Canterbury
- Diocese: Hereford
- Archdeaconry: Ludlow
- Deanery: Ludlow
- Parish: Cleobury Mortimer

Clergy
- Rector: Revd William Ashley Buck

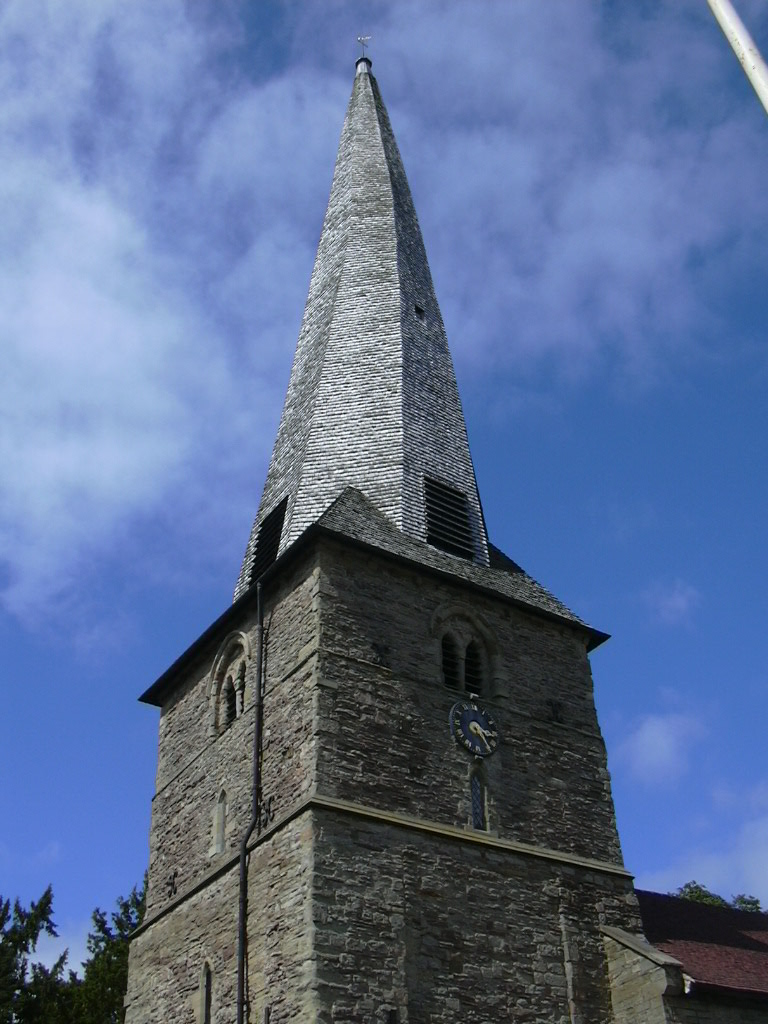
Twisted spire

St Mary's Church is an active Anglican parish church in the deanery of Ludlow, the archdeaconry of Ludlow, and the diocese of Hereford, in Cleobury Mortimer, Shropshire, England. Its benefice is united with those of six local parishes to form the Cleobury Benefice. The church is recorded in the National Heritage List for England as a designated Grade I listed building. It is notable for its shingled twisted spire. (Note: Other churches in England with twisted spires are the Church of St Mary and All Saints, Chesterfield in Derbyshire, and the Church of St Peter and St Paul in Ermington, Devon.)

== History ==
The presence of a priest in Cleobury Mortimer is recorded in the Domesday Book of 1086, and it is likely that there was a Saxon church on the site of the current church, but there are no residual signs of such a church. The earliest structure in the present church is the tower, which dates from the 12th century. The spire was added during the following century. The nave and chancel were built in the 13th century, with the aisles, chantry chapel (Note: The chapel was founded by a Roger Mortimer, thought to be the Roger Mortimer who was executed in 1330.) and porch being added later in that century. The nave and chancel roofs date from the 14th century, and the north vestry from the following century. By the end of the 18th century the south wall was leaning outwards, and was repaired in 1794 by Thomas Telford, who was at the time the county surveyor for Shropshire. The church was restored in 1874–75 by George Gilbert Scott. The restoration included replacing all the windows other than the west window, removing the plaster ceiling to reveal the timber roof, replacing the box pews, removing the three-decker pulpit and the galleries, and stripping the plaster, with its medieval paintings, from the walls. In 1994 the spire was re-shingled, and its attachment to the tower made more secure.

== Architecture ==
=== Exterior ===
St Mary's is constructed in buff sandstone, the roof is tiled and the spire shingled. Its plan consists of a five-bay nave with a clerestory, north and south aisles, a north chapel, a south porch, a chancel, and a west tower. The tower is in four stages, the lower two of which date from the 12th century, and the upper two from the following century. There are lancet windows on all but the east side, and on the south side is also a clock face. The bell openings in the top stage are paired lancets under arches. On the summit of the tower is a shingled broach spire with a "distinctive twist". (Note: It is thought that the twisting has been caused by water entering the spire, and the unseasoned timber within twisting as it dried.) The east window has three lights, and the west window has two. Inside the porch are seats along the walls and a stoup.

=== Interior ===
Inside the church, the tower arch is round-headed. It was originally Norman but spread due to the weight of the tower, and was restored and strengthened as part of Scott's restoration. The chancel arch is pointed, and its capitals are carved with leaves and human heads. The arcades are carried on circular piers. In the north wall of the chancel is a hagioscope. The north chapel contains an elaborate piscina. The nave and chancel roofs are Perpendicular in style.

The east window contains stained glass dated 1875, designed by Harry Burrow, and made by Powell's, depicting The Vision of Piers Plowman. (Note: The poem Piers Plowman is thought to have been written by William Langland, a novitiate of Woodhouse Friary located nearby.) In the south wall of the chancel is a window of 1844 by Thomas Willement depicting the Good Shepherd, and in the south aisle is a window depicting Saints Paul and Timothy, dating from 1888, designed by Henry Holiday and made by Powell's.

In the north chapel are monuments dating from the 18th century. On the north wall is a parish war memorial in the form of a wooden triptych, designed by a then vicar of the parish, with the names of men who died in World War I in the centre panel and those from World War II in the flanking panels. On the opposite wall is a brass tablet to Percy Herbert Jones of the Queen's Westminster Rifles who was killed in action at Armentières in World War I. There is also a brass tablet to Captain William Henry Trow, King's Shropshire Light Infantry, who was killed in action at Kroonstad in South Africa during the Boer War in 1900.

The two-manual pipe organ was made in 1884 by Nicholson, it was rebuilt in 1904, and improved in the 1970s by L.J. Snell. There is a ring of six bells. Five of these were cast in 1757 by Adam Rudhall, and the other in 1925 by Gillett and Johnston.

== External features ==
The wall to the southwest of the churchyard is listed at Grade II. It was largely rebuilt during the widening of Church Street in the 19th century. A stone panel dating from the 12th or 13th century has been inset into the wall; it is defaced but is probably a sheela na gig. In the churchyard is a former cross that has been converted into a sundial. Its medieval shaft is set in a hexagonal socket-stone, and carries a 19th-century octagonal head. The sundial is also listed at Grade II. In a paved surround on the south side of the churchyard, standing above the main street, is the parish war memorial, a rough-cut Celtic cross with a 'sword of sacrifice' cut into it. It is a Grade II listed structure.

== See also ==
- Grade I listed churches in Shropshire
- Listed buildings in Cleobury Mortimer
