= Pinwill sisters =

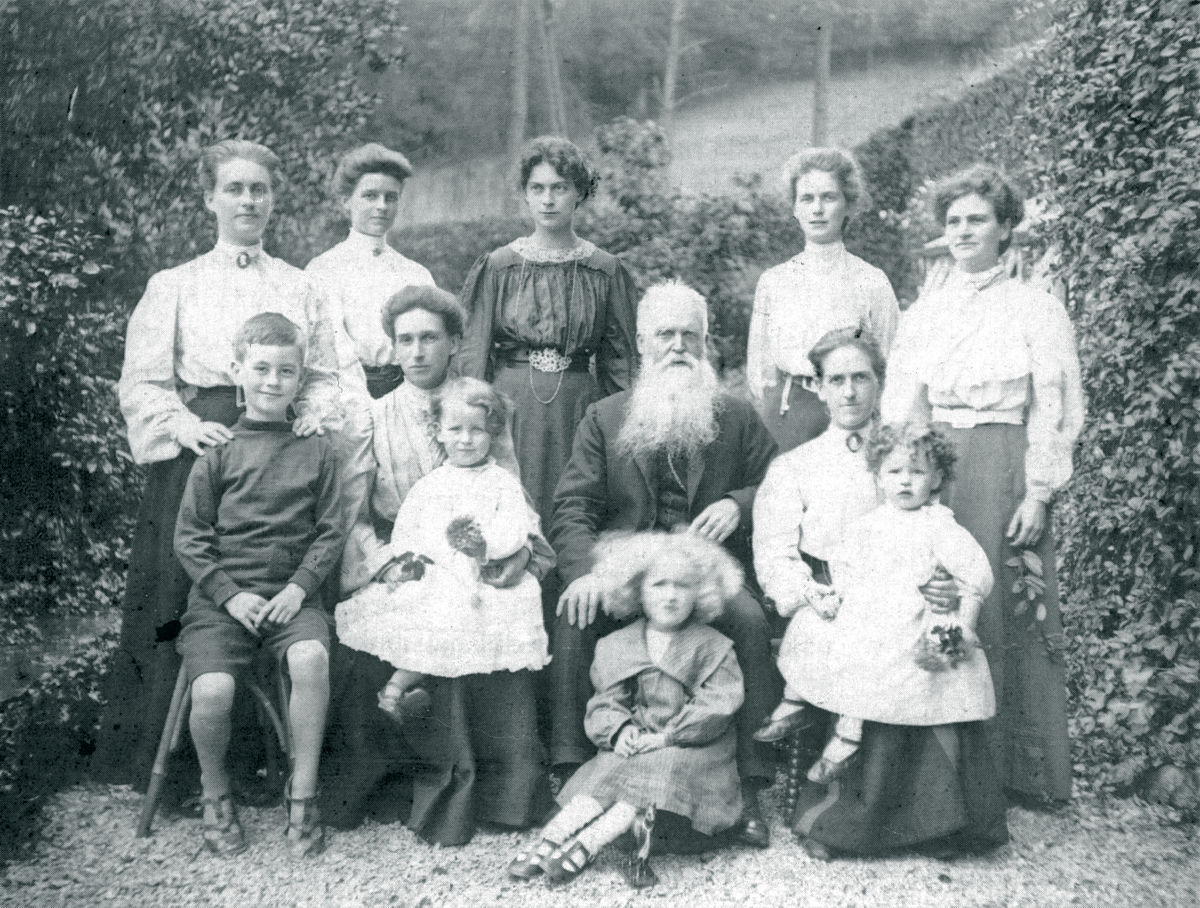
Edmund Pinwill with his daughters and grandchildren (c. 1907)

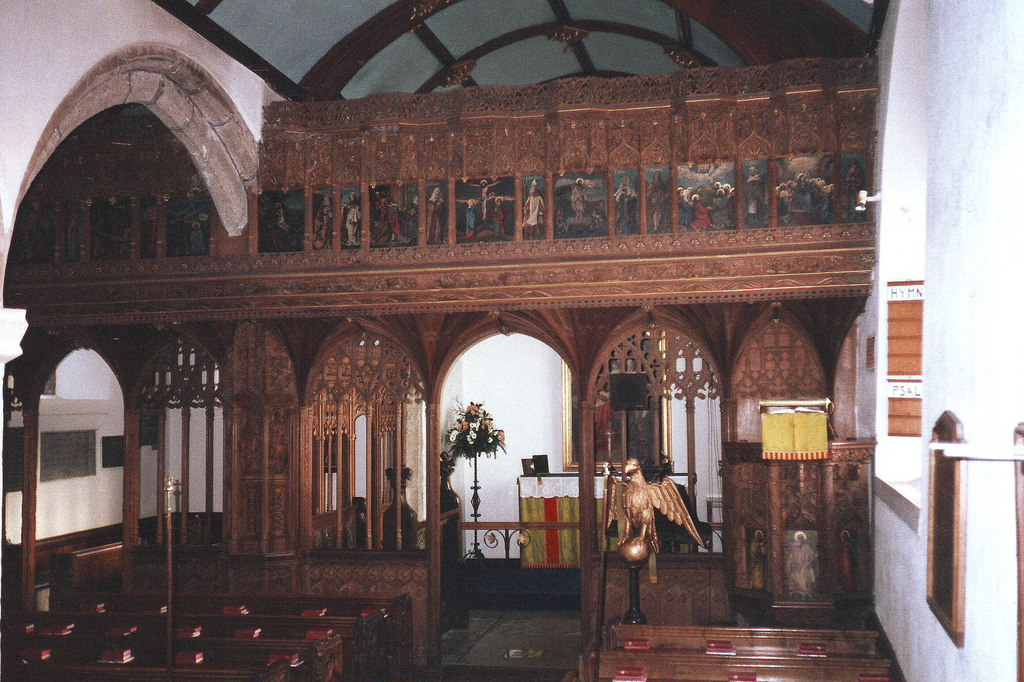
Rood screen in St Peter's Church, Lewtrenchard, carved by the Pinwill sisters

The Pinwill sisters (consisting of Mary (1871–1962), Ethel (1872–1951) and Violet (1874–1957)) were British professional woodcarvers in Devon from 1890 onwards. Although in their era there were women who produced stained glass, sculpture, wood and metalwork for churches, those women were largely unacclaimed and regarded as amateurs. The profession of ecclesiastical wood carving was one entirely carried out by men. The sisters not only became skilled at the craft, but also set up a professional workshop business. Despite the challenges of two world wars, two fires and the departure of two of the sisters, the Pinwill workshop produced innovative ecclesiastical carvings in wood and stone for more than 60 years and for over 180 churches in Devon, and Cornwall and further afield, becoming one of the most successful wood carving businesses in the South-West of England. Their vast body of work, gradually adapting from the complex, intricate designs of the Gothic Revival through to the pared-down, plainer style of twentieth-century Modern, is recognised as being of great skill, flair and worth.

== Early life and training ==
Mary, Ethel and Violet were three of seven daughters born to Elizabeth Annie Greatorex, a musical woman and church organist, after her marriage in 1867 to the Rev. Edmund Pinwill, who became vicar at Ermington, Devon, when she was 28 years old in 1880. The daughters did not attend the local primary school but were home tutored by governesses. Several factors supported the emergence of the Pinwill sisters as professional woodcarvers. During the restoration of their father's church at Ermington, the architect E. H. Sedding often stayed with the Pinwill family and became a long-term family friend. He worked with his uncle J. D. Sedding, who employed a team of masons, builders and carvers for the work. Elizabeth invited the head of the carving team to teach woodcarving to her daughters, the oldest of whom was 13 in 1884, in the evenings, in a workshop set up in a harness room above stables and furnished with benches and tools. The girls' grandfather had been an amateur carver and his books and tools were helpful to them in their studies. It was also considered quite ordinary at that time for young women to learn woodcarving alongside other skills such as sewing, drawing and singing in order that they might be considered more accomplished and thus more marriageable. For Elizabeth, though, marrying off her daughters was not her main concern. She was preparing at least some of them for an alternative to marriage. Of the seven girls, Mary, Ethel and Violet took to the carving lessons and became expert professionals in an era when there was a demand, especially within the Anglo Catholic community, for ecclesiastical artwork in churches.

== Professional ecclesiastical carving ==
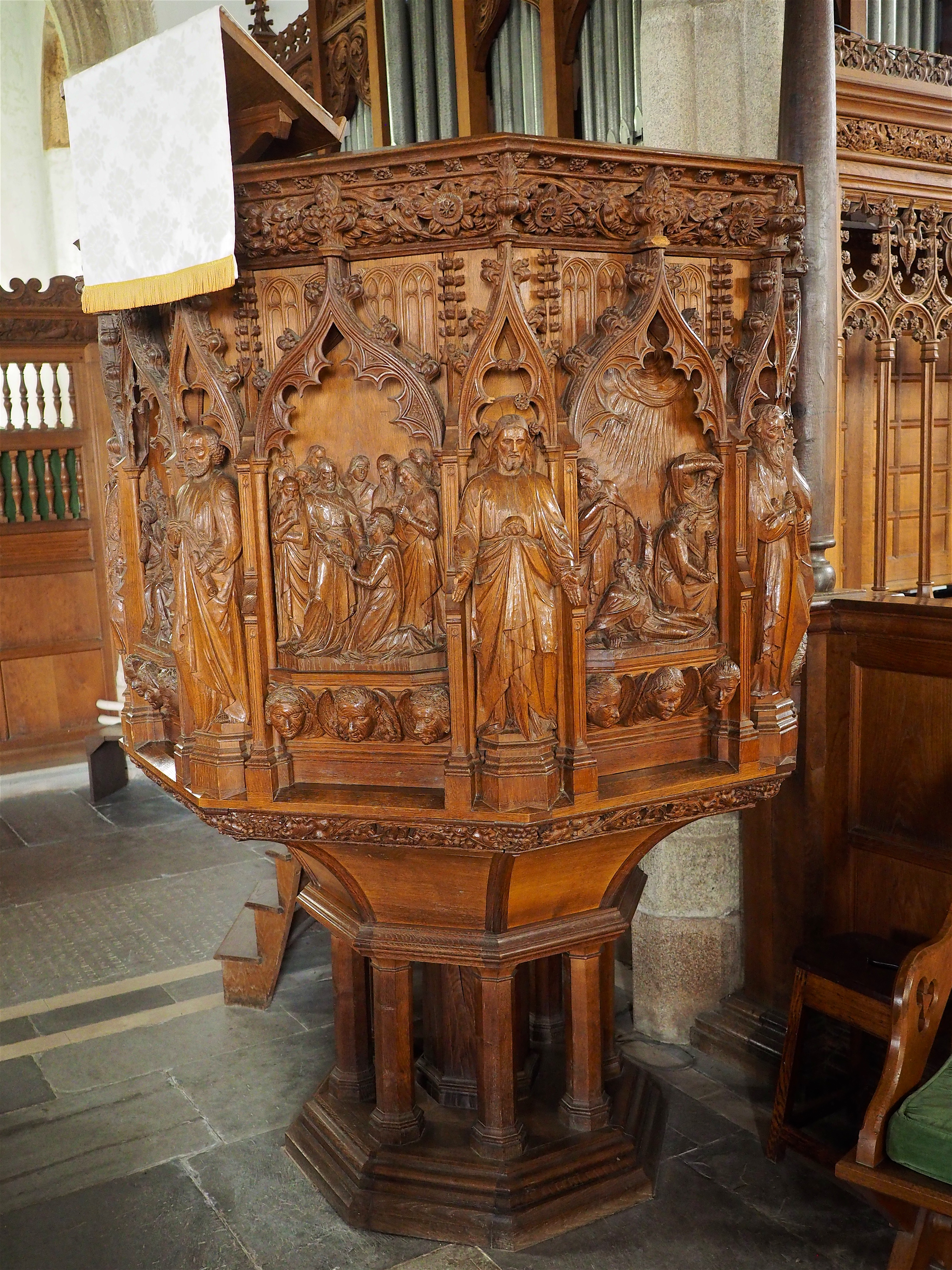
St Peter and St Paul, Ermington's pulpit by the Pinwill sisters

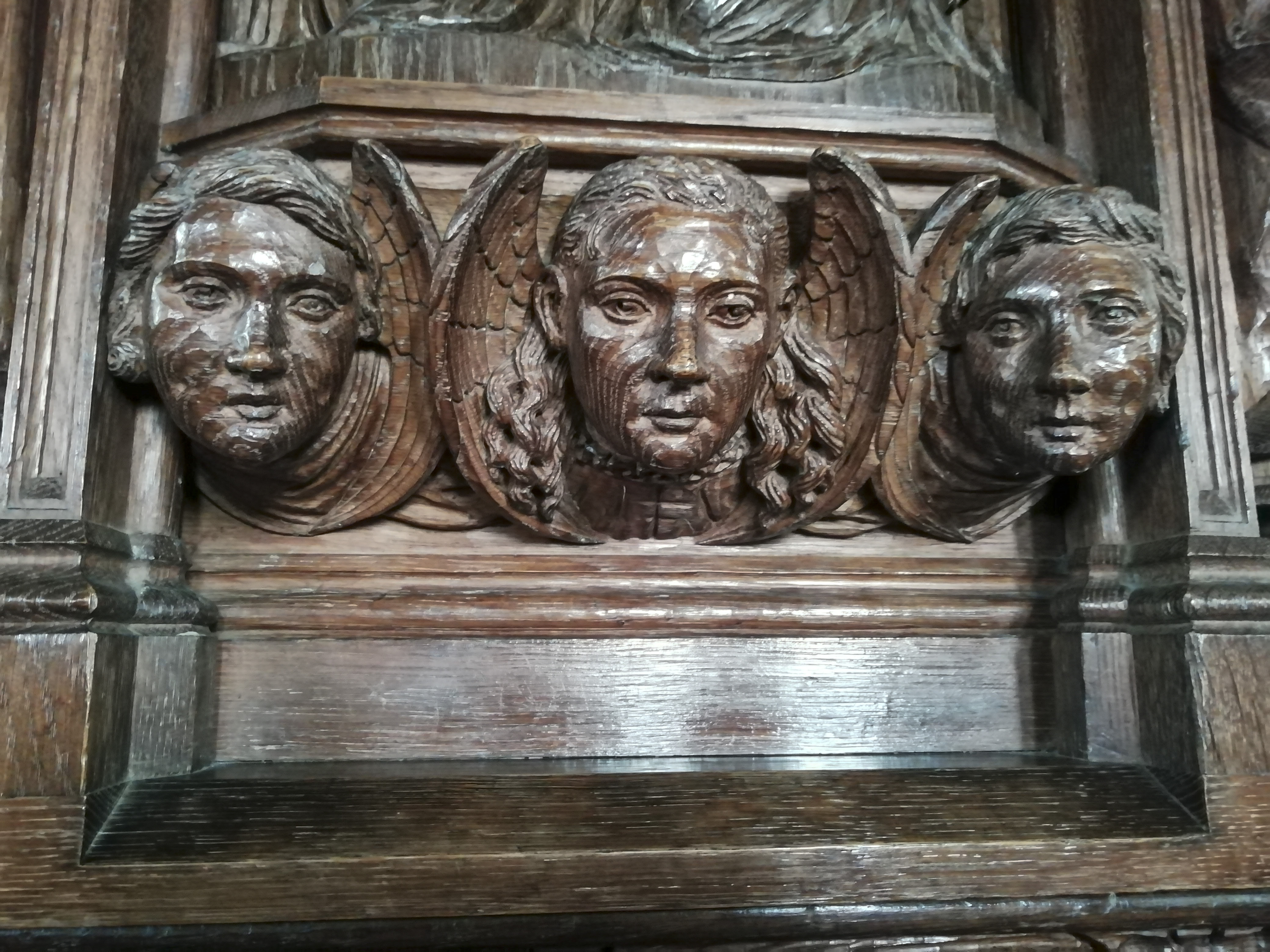
Detail of the carvings of three cherubs on the Ermington pulpit by the three Pinwill sisters

The carving of a pulpit for Ermington church by the three sisters in 1889 received excellent reviews. Their three-panelled reredos showing the Nativity, the Ascension and the Last Supper, designed for the East end of Chilthorne Domer church in Somerset, England, produced in the same year also received outstanding reviews.

By September 1890, Mary had set up a workshop in Plymouth and also offered lessons in carving. Not long afterwards Edmund H. Sedding located the offices of his architectural practice in Plymouth at the same address. Sedding worked in the context of the Arts and Crafts movement, which emphasised localness, the promotion of crafts to the status of art, and which was relatively open to women.

It was their mother's initial idea and she arranged for her daughters to have wood carving lessons. The daughters were encouraged by the training, the positive response to their work and their father in their choice of profession. He was the "head of the household", he would have been the person who filled in the 1891 census where the name and age of each of the three sisters is followed by the occupation listed as, 'Professional carver (wood)'.

Very few women who trained as wood carvers in the late nineteenth century were accepted into established companies, however. It was also extremely rare for women woodcarvers to set up in business for themselves. But this was necessary if the sisters were to compete with other wood carving businesses professionally. The three thus established their own wood carving business called Rashleigh, Pinwill and Co., in 1890. Rashleigh was Mary's middle name, a family surname coming from her father's maternal line. The impression given by the name of the company, which was chosen to hide the fact that the carvers were women, still works today as references to the sisters' work are sometimes found written in modern church guides under "Messrs. Rashleigh and Pinwill", the authors evidently believing the business to have been set up by two men as they had intended.

From 1890 onwards, the company, working both from Plymouth and Ermington, undertook an enormous body of work, from the restoration of ancient chancel screens to the production of new pieces such as pulpits, font covers, reredoses, war memorials, altar rails, bench ends, beams and bosses. Many of the early pieces were commissions designed by Sedding, who then engaged the Pinwill sisters to carry out the wood carving, thus acting as a patron to the sisters. The Sedding-Pinwill collaboration included the transformation of the church of St Carantoc in Crantock, Cornwall in the period 1899–1902 from a "near ruin to a model of Anglo-Catholicism in a rural Cornish setting....in which the synthesis between design and execution was truly seamless."

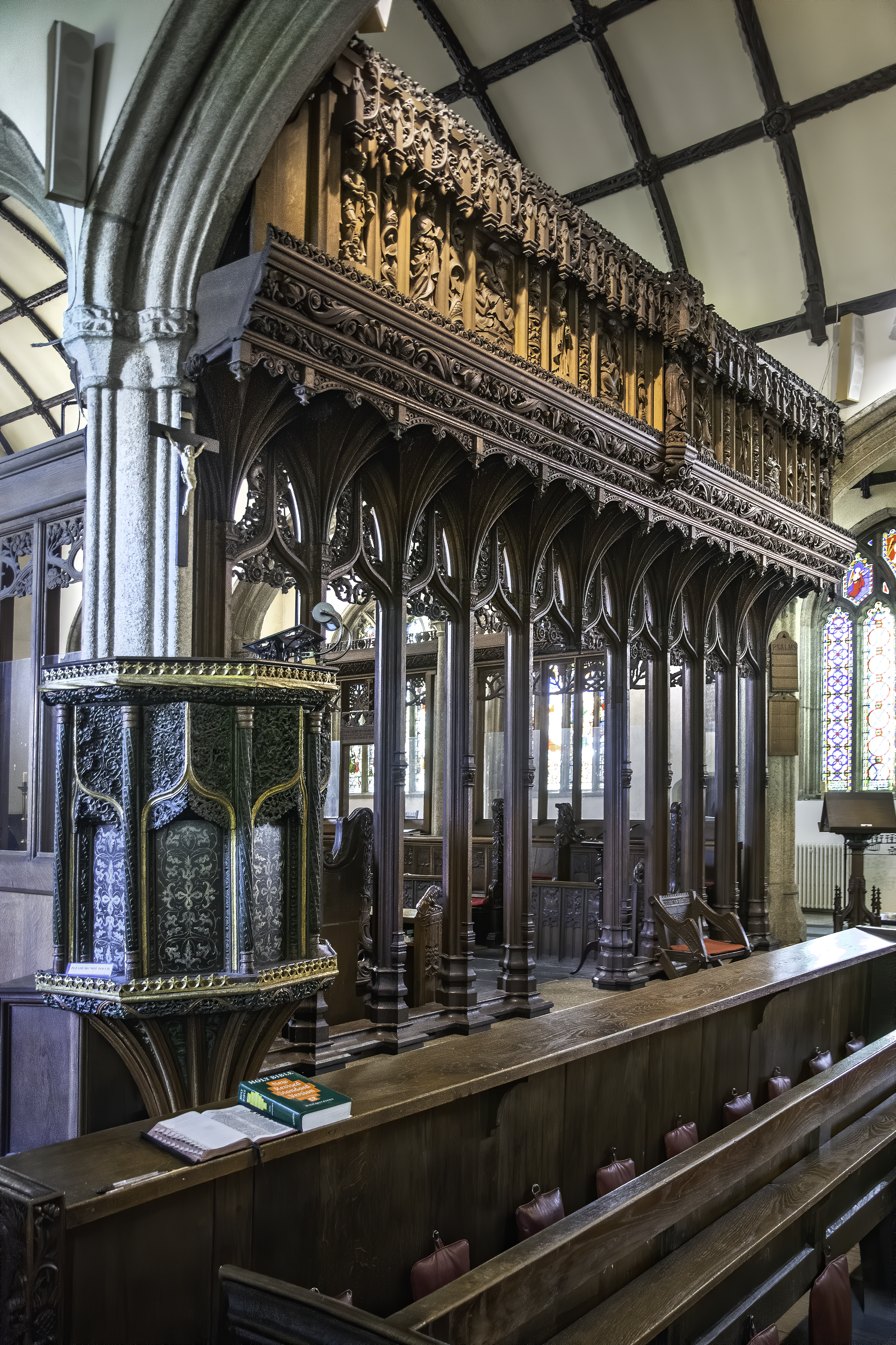
Launceston St Mary Magdalene (16th century) Pulpit and Gothic Rood Screen by the Pinwill sisters

Other examples of the work produced by the workshop are the rood screen at Lewtrenchard, Devon (See photo) and carvings at Morwenstow, Cornwall and at the church of St Laurence, Upminster, London.

== Changes in the Pinwill workshop ==
In 1900, Mary married and as was expected of women of her social standing at the time, gave up paid employment. Ethel and Violet continued to develop their business together. Violet took over Mary's role in Plymouth and in 1901 started teaching men and boys at the Plymouth Technical School's Art School. This gave her access to the good apprentices needed for the many large and small scale projects throughout Devon and Cornwall that Sedding and other architects commissioned and designed and the Pinwill sisters carved.

By 1911, Ethel had set up on her own as a professional woodcarver in Kingston Upon Thames in Surrey, while the 1911 census shows Violet living in Plymouth. An analysis of the census also shows a shift in women's occupations away from teaching and domestic service to more traditionally male forms of employment. There were, for example, some 350 women woodcarvers working throughout England and Wales in that year.

By the outbreak of World War I in 1914, Violet, now the sole proprietor of the business, had gradually changed the company name to V. Pinwill Carver., and was employing 29 men and boys in the company, as carvers and joiners. The number of commissions declined as the war went on and many of her skilled and experienced employees were called up for military service. Violet thus closed the workshop for a time, re-opening afterwards, working on memorials to those killed in the war, as well as other projects.

Between the wars, a period of austerity caused difficulties for the workshop and in 1921, Sedding, the workshop's great supporter and patron, died. Violet was by now, however, very capable of producing her own designs. World War II again caused Violet's employees to enlist but also brought memorial commissions in the post war years.

Violet continued her teaching until at least 1945, as well as large commissions into the 1950s, and was finishing off a life size figure of St Peter for a Lancashire church a few days before her death, aged 82, in 1957.

== Legacy ==
After Violet died, all her assets were sold off. Plans, designs, maquettes, and workshop tools were sold or destroyed, although hundreds of photographs were kept and donated to the Plymouth and West Devon Record Office and others to the Women's Art Library, Goldsmiths University of London. The blitz of Plymouth in World War II led to the destruction of many buildings containing work by the Pinwill company. Nevertheless, there remain today at least 76 churches in Devon and 92 in Cornwall containing ecclesiastical wood carvings by the Pinwill workshop, as well as 20 commissions in 13 other counties, secular and military works, and pieces of furniture made for friends and family, making a tally of some 650 individual items.

== Quotes ==
"Their meticulous repairs, imaginative reinventions and new interpretations delight the eye and make the spirit soar." Peter Beacham OBE 2020.
