= Spire =

Structure on top of a roof, skyscraper or tower

The Burj Khalifa holds the record of the tallest spire in the world, with the height of 244 m (801 ft)

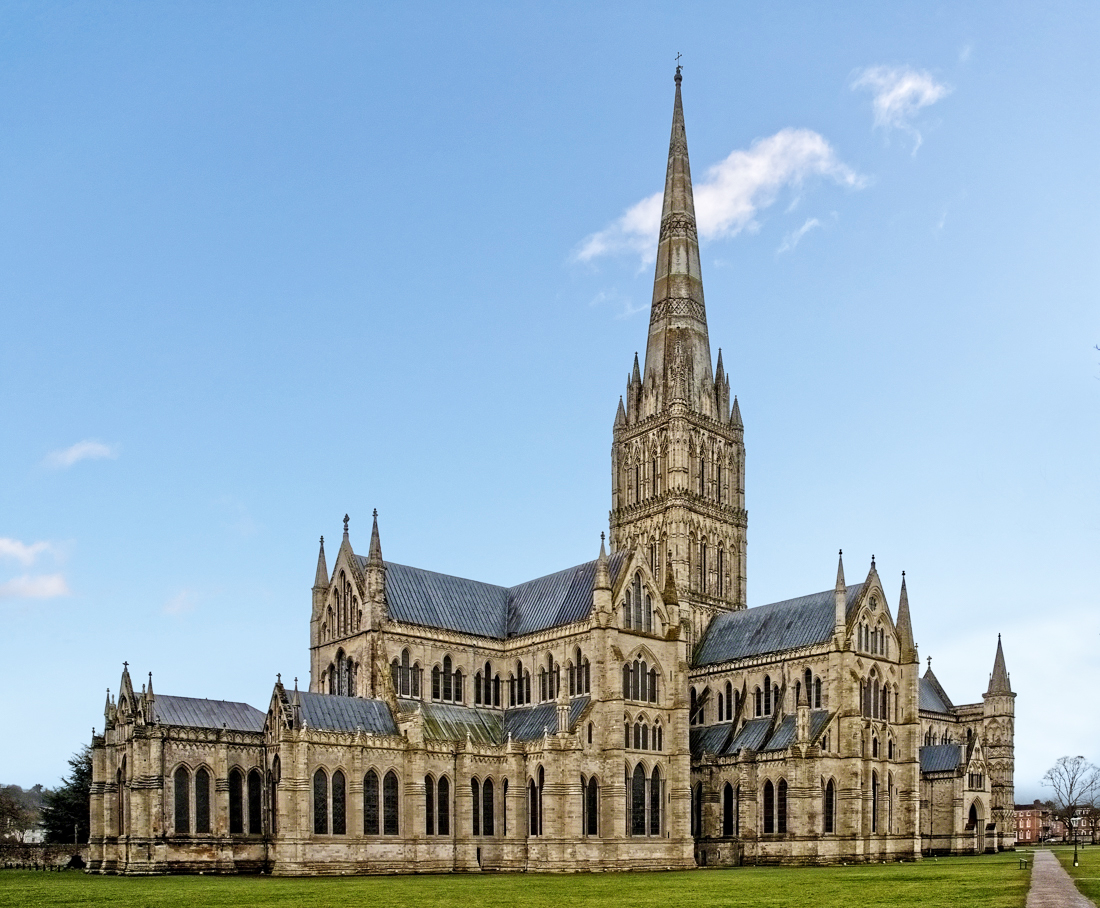
Spire of Salisbury Cathedral (completed 1320), 123 m (404 ft)

A spire is a tall, slender, pointed structure on top of a roof of a building or tower, especially at the summit of church steeples. A spire may have a square, circular, or polygonal plan, with a roughly conical or pyramidal shape. Spires are typically made of stonework or brickwork, or else of timber structures with metal cladding, ceramic tiling, roof shingles, or slates on the exterior.

Since towers supporting spires are usually square, square-plan spires emerge directly from the tower's walls, but octagonal spires are either built above a pyramidal transition section called a broach at the spire's base, or else free spaces around the tower's summit for decorative elements like pinnacles. The former solution is known as a broach spire. Small or short spires are known as spikes, spirelets, or flèches.

== Etymology ==
This sense of the word spire is attested in English since the 1590s, spir having been used in Middle Low German since the 14th century, a form related to the Old English word spir, meaning a sprout, shoot, or stalk of grass.

== Gothic spires ==
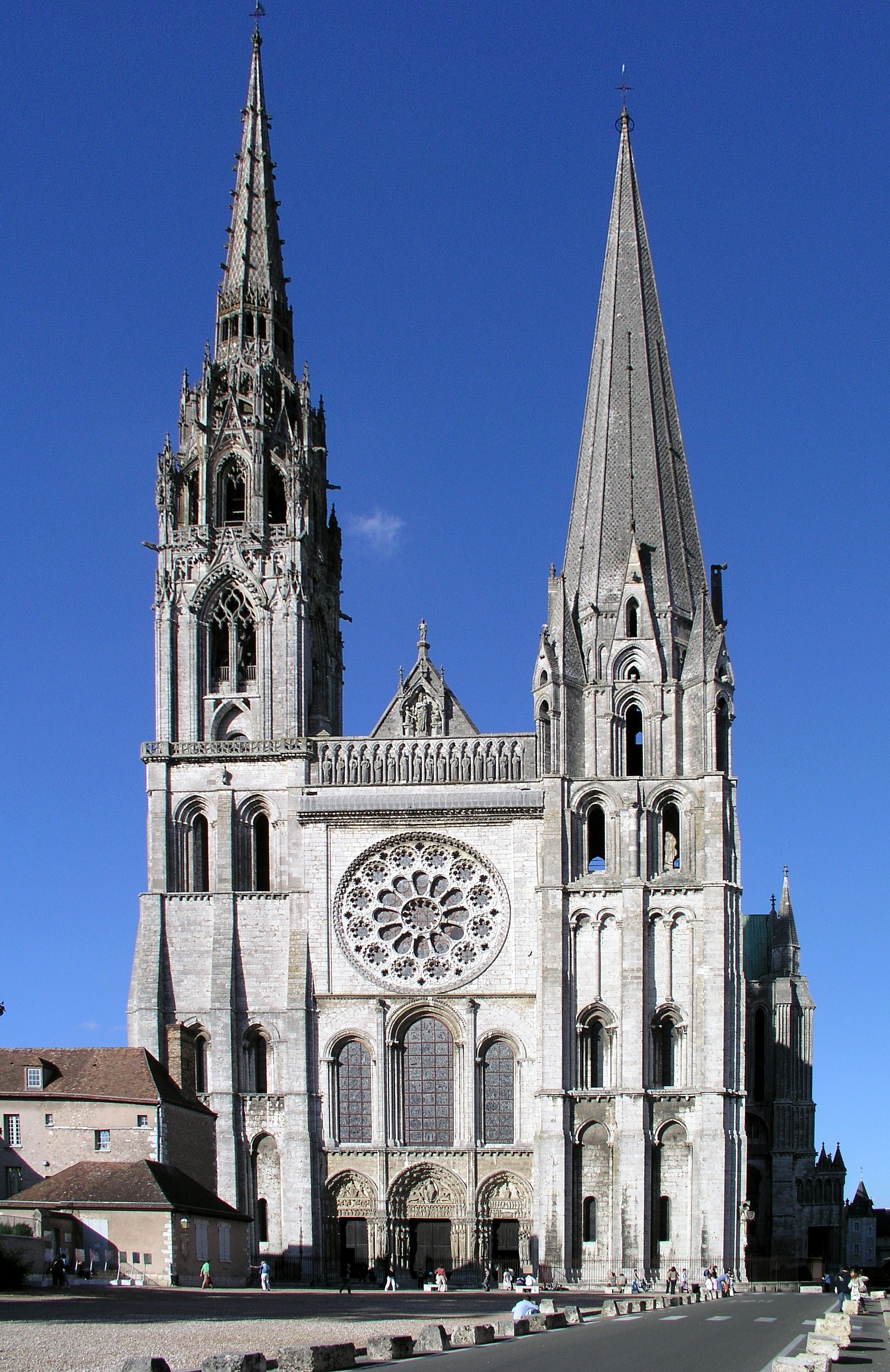
Chartres Cathedral. The Flamboyant Gothic North Tower (finished 1513) (left) and Romanesque South Tower (1144–1150) (right)

The Gothic church spire originated in the 12th century as a simple, four-sided pyramidal structure on top of a church tower. The spire could be constructed of masonry, as at Salisbury Cathedral, or of wood covered with lead, as at Notre-Dame de Paris. Gradually, spires became taller, slimmer, and more complex in form. Triangular sections of masonry, called broaches were added to the sides, at an angle to the faces of the tower, as at St Columba, Cologne. In the 12th and 13th centuries, more ornament was added to the faces of the spires, particularly gabled dormers over the centres of the faces of the towers, as in the southwest tower of Chartres Cathedral. Additional vertical ornament, in the form of slender pinnacles in pyramid shapes, were often placed around the spires, to express the transition between the square base and the octagonal spire.

The spires of the late 13th century achieved great height; one example was Freiburg Minster in Germany, where the gabled lantern and spire reached a height of 385 feet (117 meters). In England, a tall needle spire was sometimes constructed at the edge of tower, with pinnacles at the other corners. The western spires of Lichfield Cathedral are an example.

Spires were particularly fragile in the wind, and a number of English Gothic spires collapsed; notably that of Malmesbury Abbey (1180–1500); Lincoln Cathedral (which had been the tallest in the world) 1349–1549; and Chichester Cathedral (1402–1861). The spire of Salisbury Cathedral, completed in 1320 and 404 feet (123 meters) tall, without the tower, required the addition of buttresses, arches and tie irons to keep it intact. Finally, in 1668 the architect Christopher Wren designed reinforcing beams which halted the deformation of the structure.

Openwork spires were a notable architectural innovation, beginning with the spire at Freiburg Minster, in which the pierced stonework was held together by iron cramps. The openwork spire, represented a radical but logical extension of the Gothic tendency toward a skeletal structure.

== Crown spires ==
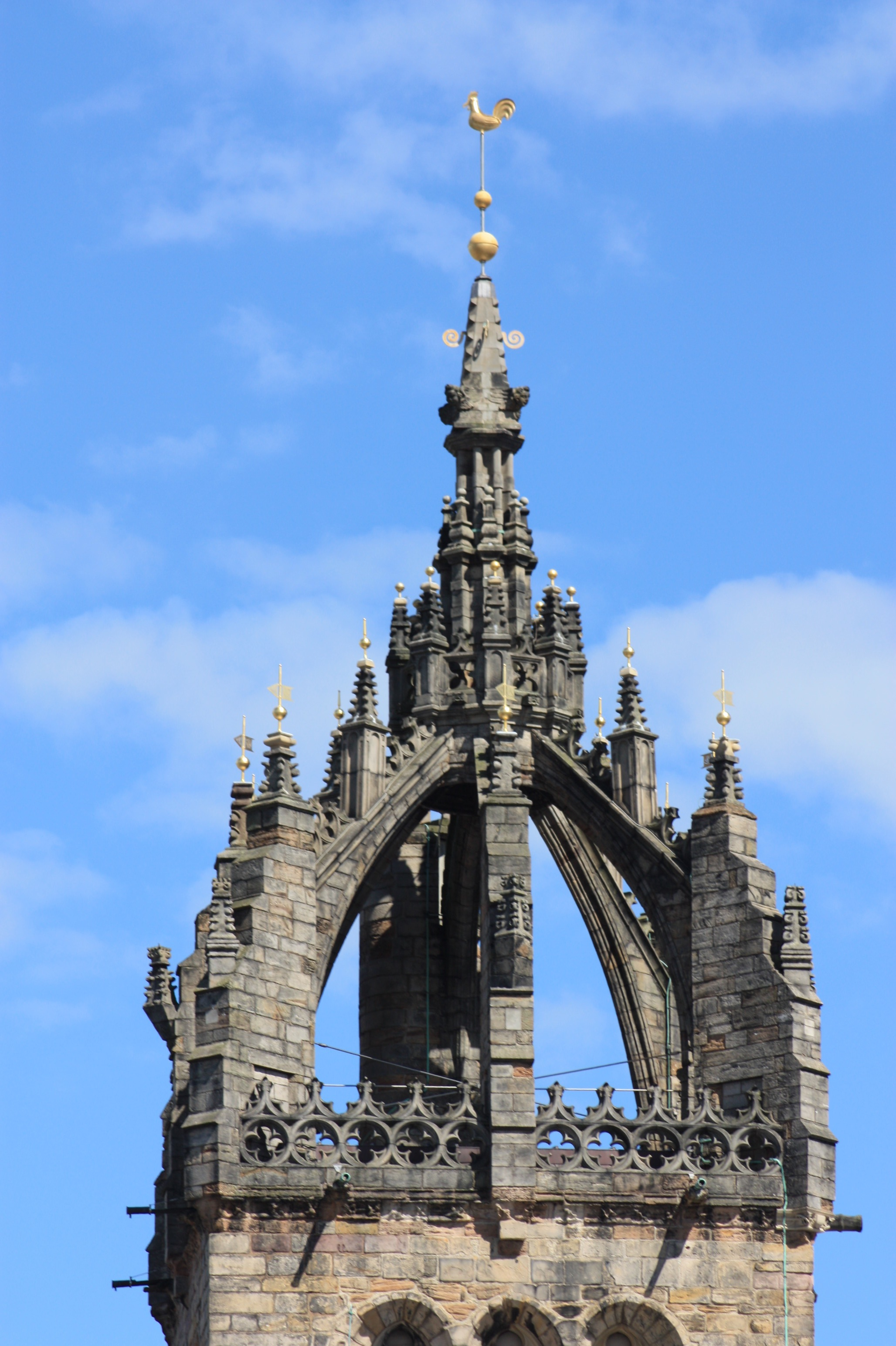
Crown spire on the High Kirk, Edinburgh.

Crown spires have a fully exposed structure of arches not unlike the arches of a medieval European crown. The spire itself is supported by buttress structures.

== Needle-spires and Hertfordshire spikes ==
A needle-spire is a particularly tall and narrow spire emerging from a tower surrounded by a parapet. In general, the term applies to considerably larger and more refined spires than the name Hertfordshire spike.

A Hertfordshire spike is a type of short spire, needle-spire, or flèche ringed with a parapet and found on church-towers in the British Isles.

== Splay-foot ==
The roofs of splay-foot spires open out and flatten off at their base, creating eaves above the tower supporting the spire.

== Flèches ==
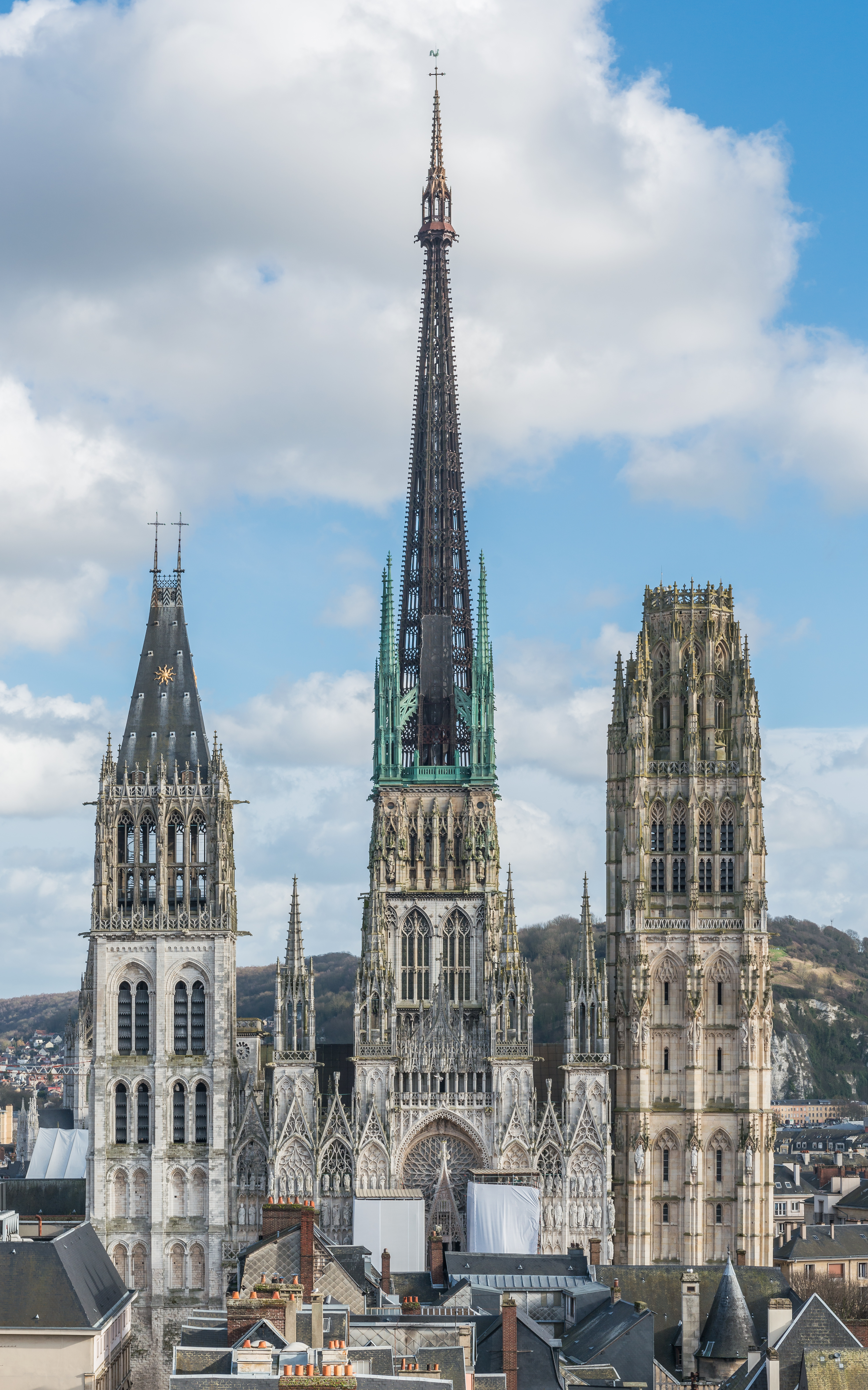
Rouen Cathedral, with 151 m (495 ft) the tallest flèche in France

A flèche (French: flèche, lit. 'arrow') is a name given to spires in Gothic architecture: in French the word is applied to any spire, but in English it has the technical meaning of a spirelet or spike on the rooftop of a building. In particular, the spirelets often built atop the crossings of major churches in mediaeval French Gothic architecture are called flèches.

On the ridge of the roof on top of the crossing (the intersection of the nave and the transepts) of a church, flèches were typically light, delicate, timber-framed constructions with a metallic sheath of lead or copper. They are often richly decorated with architectural and sculptural embellishments: tracery, crockets, and miniature buttresses serve to adorn the flèche.

The most famous flèche was the Neo-Gothic 19th-century design by Eugène Viollet-le-Duc for the Notre-Dame de Paris, 100 feet (30 meters) tall and richly decorated with sculpture. The original flèche of Notre-Dame was built in the 13th century, and removed in 1786, shortly before the French Revolution. The famous replacement by Viollet-le-Duc with an abundance of sculpture was destroyed in the 2019 Notre-Dame de Paris fire. It will be rebuilt in the same form.

== Pinnacles ==
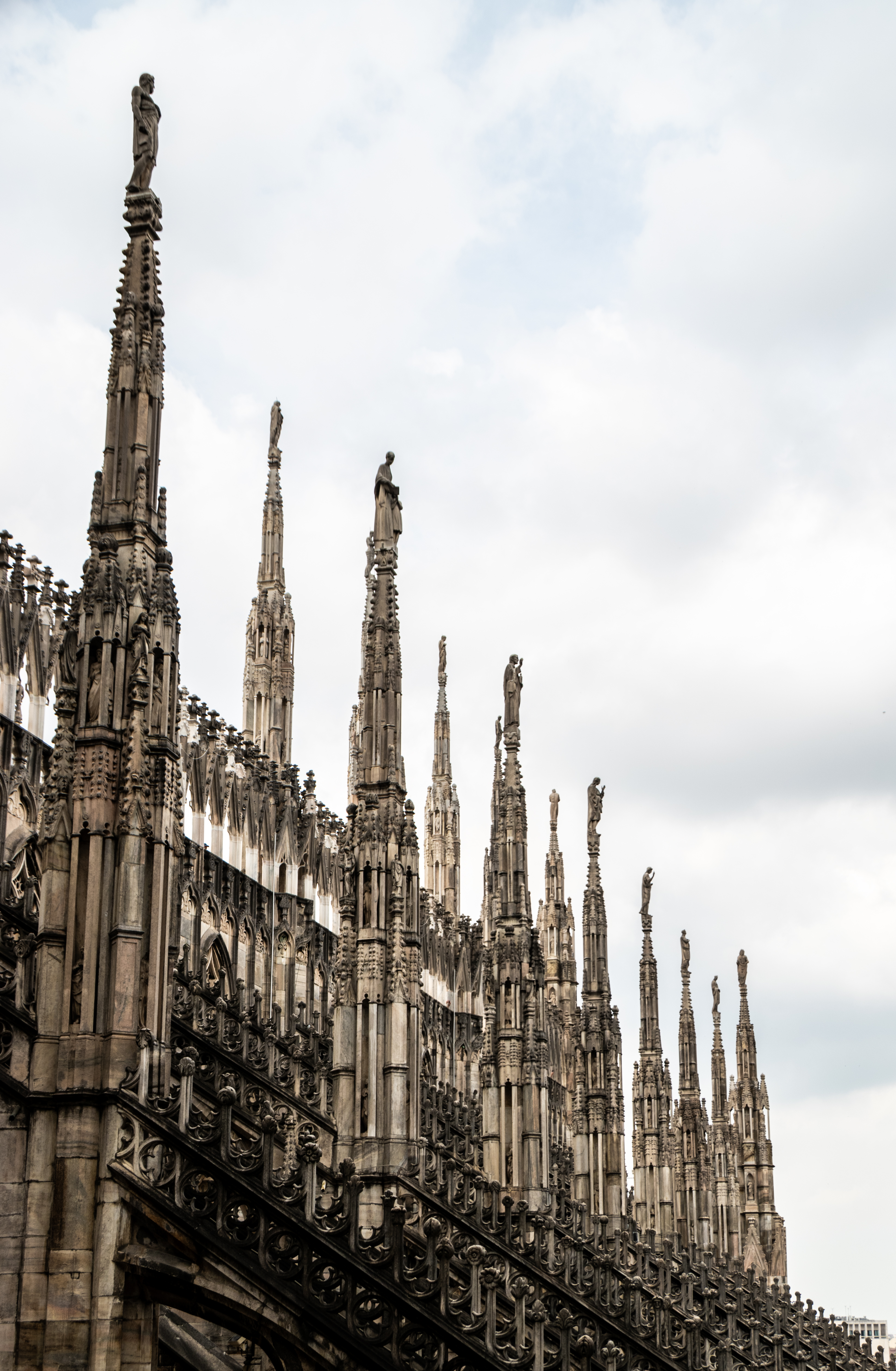
Gothic pinnacles of Milan Cathedral

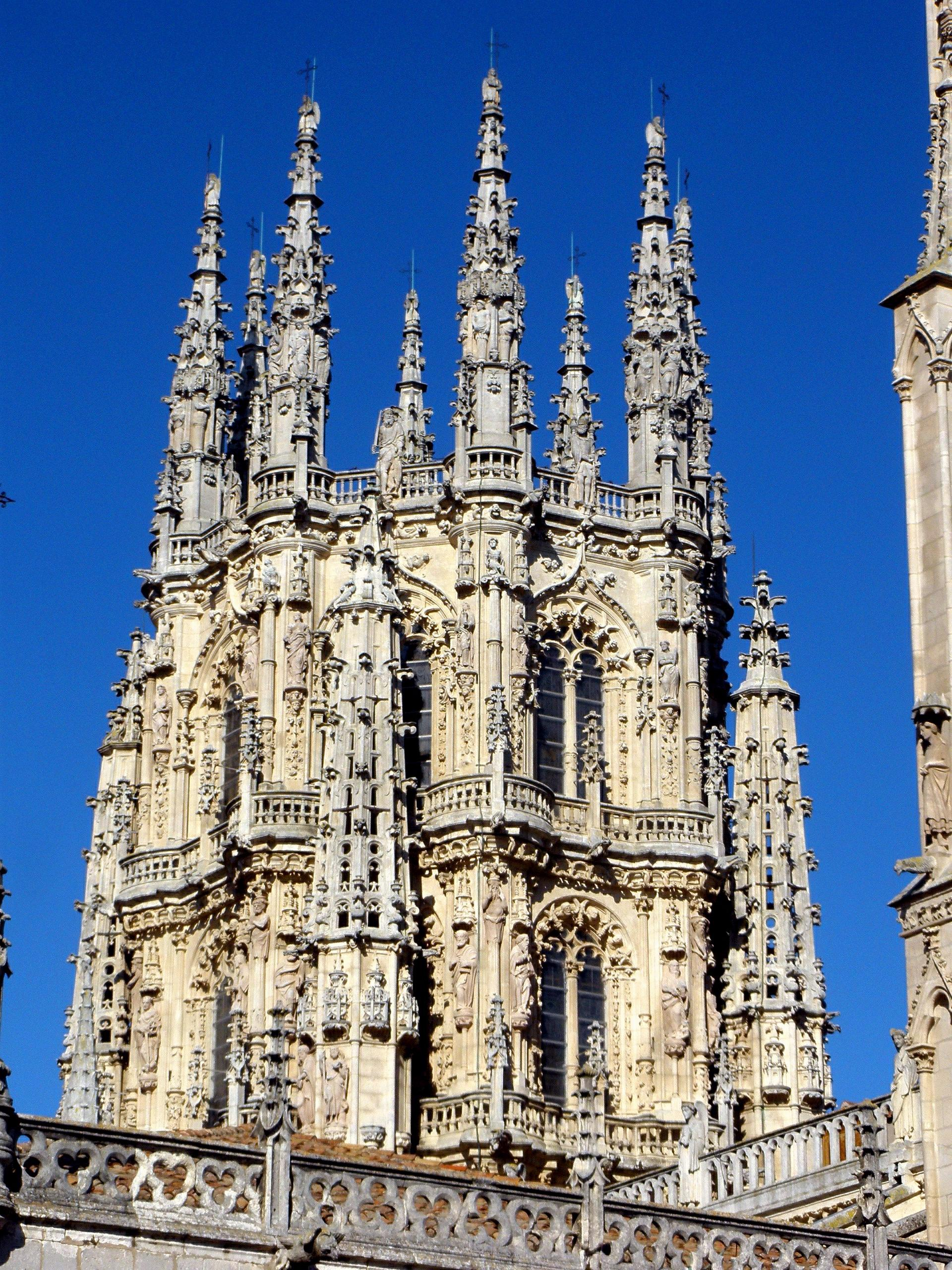
The octagonal tower of Burgos Cathedral (1221–1260), with an array of pinnacles

A pinnacle is a miniature spire that was used both as a decorative and functional element. In early Gothic, as at Notre-Dame de Paris, stone pinnacles were placed atop flying buttresses, to give them additional weight and stability, and to counterbalance the outward thrust from the rib vaults of the nave. As an ornament, they were used to break up the horizontal lines, such as parapets and the roofs of towers. In later Gothic, they were sometimes often clustered together into forests of vertical ornament.

== Traditional types of spires ==
- Conical stone spires: These are usually found on circular towers and turrets, usually of small diameter.
- Masonry spires: These are found on medieval and revival churches and cathedrals, generally with towers that are square in plan. While masonry spires on a tower of small plan may be pyramidal, spires on towers of large plan are generally octagonal. The spire is supported on stone squinches which span the corners of the tower, making an octagonal plan. The spire of Salisbury Cathedral is of this type and is the tallest masonry spire in the world, remaining substantially intact since the 13th century. Other spires of this sort include the south spire of Chartres Cathedral, and the spires of Norwich Cathedral, Chichester Cathedral and Oxford Cathedral.
- Openwork spires: These spires are constructed of a network of stone tracery, which, being considerably lighter than a masonry spire, can be built to greater heights. Many famous tall spires are of this type, including the spires of Ulm Minster (the world's tallest church), Freiburg Minster, Strasbourg Cathedral, Vienna Cathedral, Prague Cathedral, Burgos Cathedral and the twin spires of Cologne Cathedral.
- Complex spires: These are stone spires that combine both masonry and openwork elements. Some such spires were constructed in the Gothic style, such as the north spire of Chartres Cathedral. They became increasingly common in Baroque architecture, and are a feature of Christopher Wren's churches.
- Clad spires: These are constructed with a wooden frame, often standing on a tower of brick or stone construction, but also occurring on wooden towers in countries where wooden buildings are prevalent. They are often clad in metal, such as copper or lead. They may also be tiled or shingled.

Clad spires can take a variety of shapes. These include:

Pyramidal spires, which may be of low profile, rising to a height not much greater than its width, or, more rarely, of high profile.
Rhenish helm: This is a four-sided tower topped with a pyramidal roof. each of the four sides of the roof is rhomboid in form, with the long diagonal running from the apex of roof to one of the corners of the supporting tower; each side of the tower is thus topped with a gable from whose peak a ridge runs to the apex of the roof.
Broach spires: These are octagonal spires sitting on a square tower, with a section of spire rising from each corner of the tower, and bridging the spaces between the corners and four of the sides.
Bell-shaped spires: These spires, sometimes square in plan, occur mostly in Northern, Alpine and Eastern Europe, where they occur alternately with onion-shaped domes.

== Notable spires ==
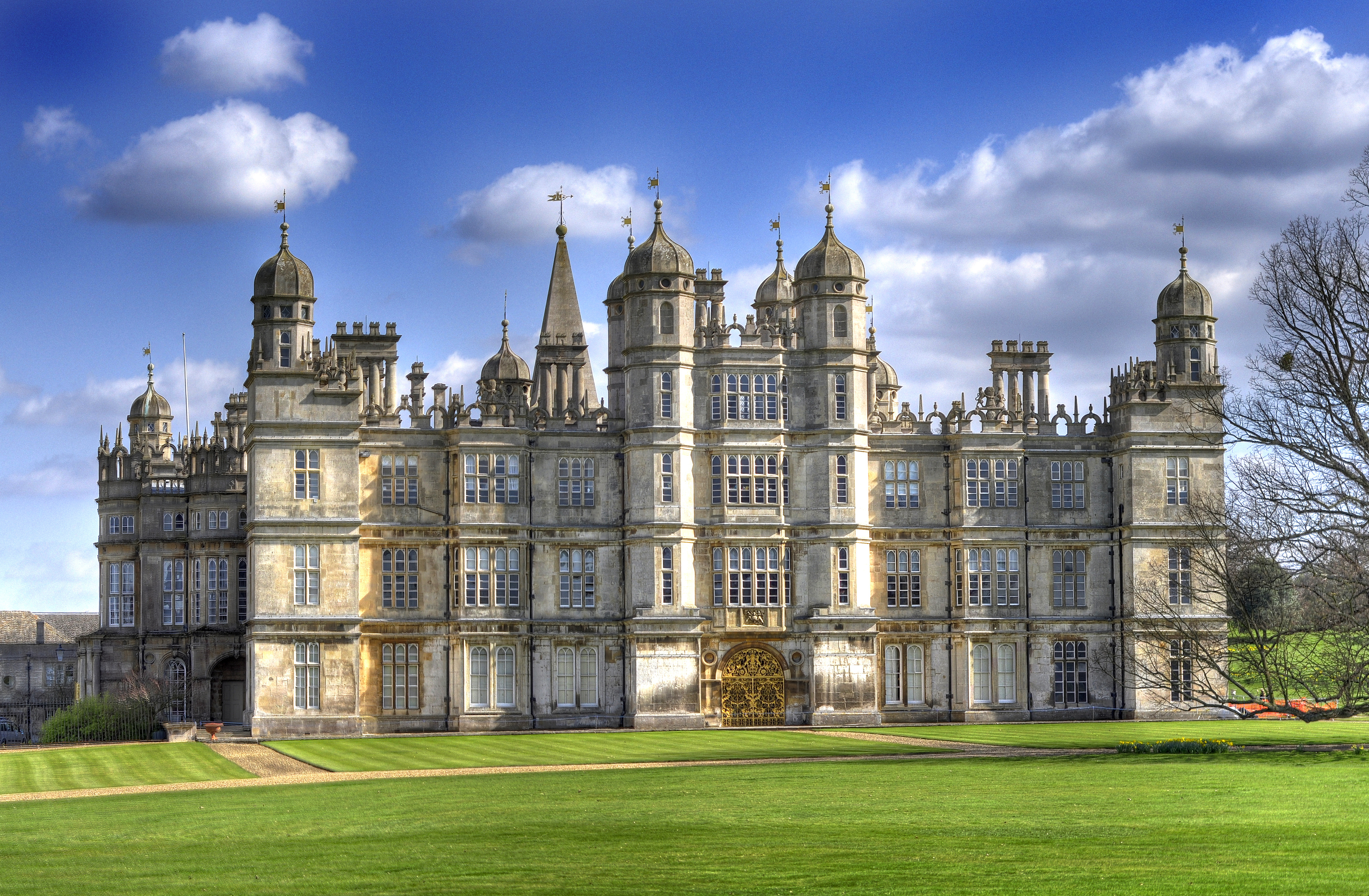
The spire of Burghley House (1555–1587) is an example of a spire on non-religious building.

- Lincoln Cathedral's 525 foot (160 m) high medieval spire on the crossing tower was the tallest building in the world for 238 years (1311–1548) before its collapse. It was the first building to be taller than the Great Pyramid of Giza and nothing taller would be built until the Eiffel Tower was finished in 1889.
- Salisbury Cathedral's 404 foot (123 m) high spire on the crossing tower has been the tallest church spire in the British Isles since the collapse of Lincoln's crossing spire in 1548.
- St Mary's Church, Stralsund's 495 foot (151 m) high spire made it the tallest building in the world after the collapse of Lincoln's crossing spire in 1548 until 1569, when Beauvais Cathedral's tower exceeded it in height. Beauvais's tower collapsed in 1573, after which St Mary's remained the tallest building until 1647, when the spire was destroyed by lightning and subsequently replaced with a lower Baroque dome (excepting 1569–1573)
- Cologne Cathedral's 515 foot (157 m) high spires were built 1248 and 1473, but not completed, and again from 1842, still following faithfully the original plan, until their completions in 1880. The architecture of the spires blends entirely with the tower, making them difficult to separate. The combined tower-spires are 157 meters (515 feet) high. The church is the tallest cathedral anywhere and has the tallest pair of spires.
- St Martin's Church, Landshut, spire whose Brick Gothic tower was finished in 1507, makes it the tallest brick-built church in the world, and the second tallest (unreinforced) brick building anywhere.
- The spire at Burghley House in England, built for Elizabeth I's Lord Chancellor in 1585 is an example of a spire on a non-religious building.
- The 123 metre spire of Antwerp Cathedral is the tallest ecclesiastical structure in the Low Countries.
- The 119 metre pair of spires of Uppsala Cathedral are the tallest in Scandinavia.
- Ulm Minster, a Lutheran church in Germany, has the distinction of having the tallest church tower in Europe, at 161.5 metres or 530 feet. The height was deliberately sought to make it slightly higher than the Catholic Cologne Cathedral.
- The Spire of Notre-Dame de Paris designed by Eugène Viollet-le-Duc was a famous flèche that crowned the crossing ridge of Notre-Dame de Paris between 1859 and 2019.
- The organic skeleton of Antoni Gaudi's spires at the Sagrada Família in Barcelona are a blend of Gothic and Gaudi's particular style. Designed and begun by Gaudi in 1884, they are still being completed in the early 21st century.

== Religious symbolism ==
In Gothic architecture, where the spire is most commonly used, and particularly in Gothic cathedrals and churches it symbolised the heavenly aspirations of churches' builders, as well as offering a visual spectacle of extreme height. It also suggested, by its similarity to a spear point, the power and strength of religion.

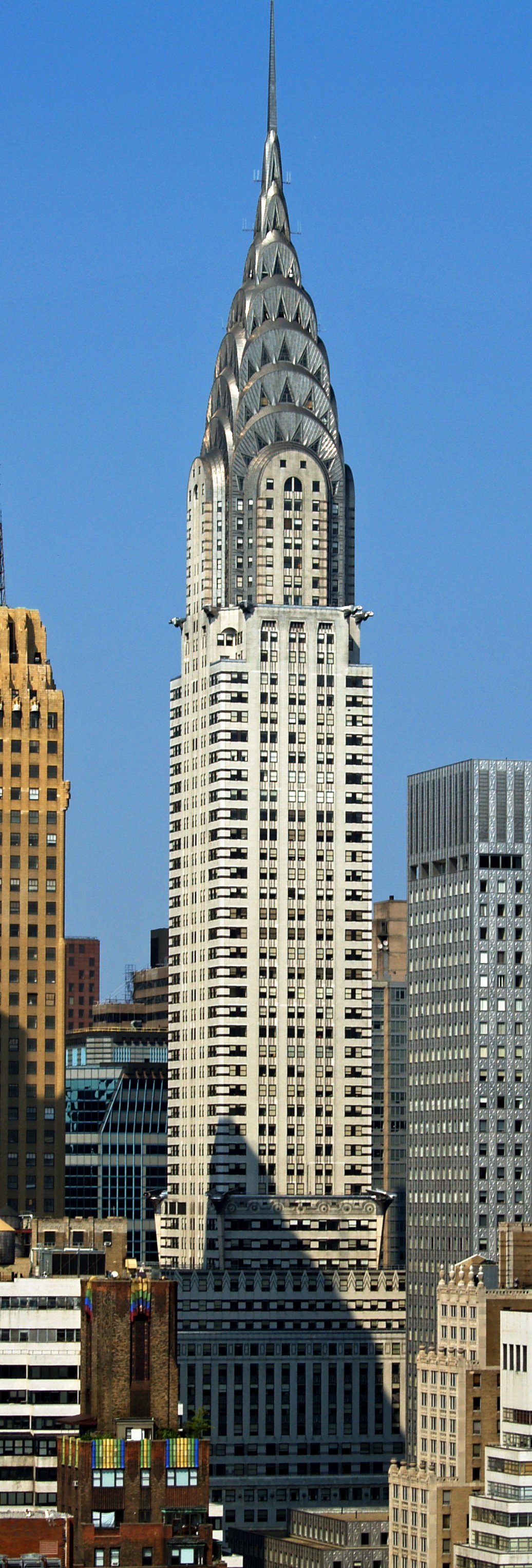
The Chrysler Building was the world-first skyscraper with a spire

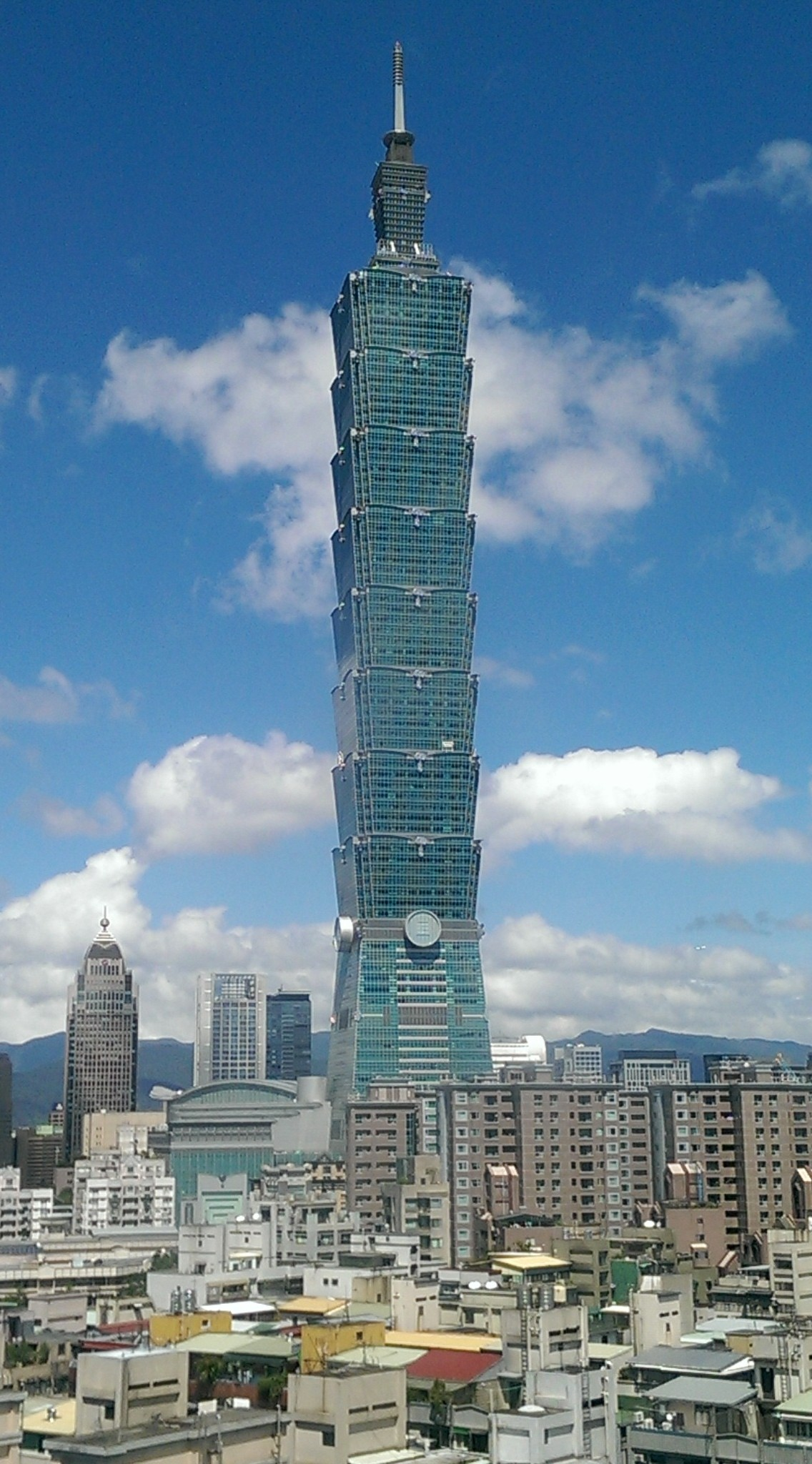
Before the Burj Khalifa, the Taipei 101 had the former tallest spire in the world.

== List of tallest spires (skyscraper) ==
Rank	Name	Spire height	Completed	Country	City
1	Burj Khalifa	244 m (801 ft)	2009	United Arab Emirates	Dubai
2	Merdeka 118	160 m (520 ft)	2021	Malaysia	Kuala Lumpur
3	One World Trade Center	124.3 m (408 ft)	2014	United States	New York City
4	Lakhta Center	101 m (331 ft)	2019	Russia	Saint Petersburg
5	Bank of America Tower	110.8 m (364 ft)	2009	United States	New York City
6	Abraj Al-Bait Clock Tower	71 m (233 ft)	2012	Saudi Arabia	Mecca
7	Landmark 81	65 m (213 ft)	2018	Vietnam	Ho Chi Minh City
8	Autograph Tower	60 m (200 ft)	2022	Indonesia	Jakarta
9	Taipei 101	59 m (194 ft)	2004	Taiwan	Taipei
10	Bank of China Tower	52.4 m (172 ft)	1990	China	Hong Kong
11	Empire State Building	51 m (167 ft)	1931	United States	New York City
12	Petronas Tower 1	50 m (160 ft)	1996	Malaysia	Kuala Lumpur
12	Petronas Tower 2	50 m (160 ft)	1996	Malaysia	Kuala Lumpur
13	Emirates Tower One	43.6 m (143 ft)	2000	United Arab Emirates	Dubai
14	Emirates Tower Two	40 m (130 ft)	2000	United Arab Emirates	Dubai
15	Chrysler Building	37 m (121 ft)	1930	United States	New York City
16	Jin Mao Tower	35 m (115 ft)	1999	China	Shanghai
17	One Vanderbilt	30 m (98 ft)	2020	United States	New York City
18	IPK Kedah Tower	15 m (49 ft)	2012	Malaysia	Alor Setar
18	SADA Tower	15 m (49 ft)	2016	Malaysia	Alor Setar

== See also ==
- Pinnacle
- Flèche
- Crooked spire
- List of twisted spires
- Gothic architecture
- Gothic cathedrals and churches
- Spire of Dublin
