= Ermington =

Ermington can refer to:

- Ermington, Devon, a village in the county of Devon, England
- Ermington, New South Wales, a suburb of Sydney, Australia
  - Ermington House, the residence of Edmund Lockyer in Ermington, Australia
