= Mawley Hall =

Country house in Shropshire, England

Coordinates: 52.3744°N 2.4589°W

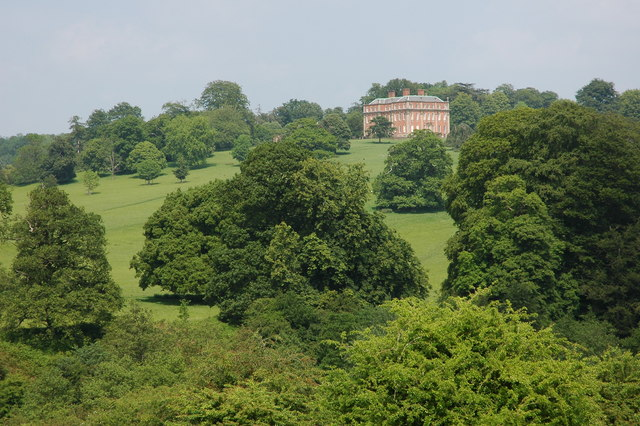
Mawley Hall

Mawley Hall is a privately owned 18th-century country mansion near Cleobury Mortimer, Shropshire, England. It is a Grade I listed building.

The Blount family of Sodington Hall, Mamble, Worcestershire, wealthy coalowners and ironfounders, acquired estates in neighbouring Shropshire. They were prominent Roman Catholics and Walter Blount was created a baronet in 1624 (see Blount baronets). As Royalist supporters and therefore on the losing side during the English Civil War they suffered financial difficulties in the 17th century but their fortunes recovered following the English Restoration of 1660.

In 1730 Sir Edward Blount commissioned Francis Smith of Warwick to design a new mansion house for the estate at Mawley. It is built on a rectangular plan of nine by seven bays with a nine bay three storey entrance front to the north east. The advanced three central bays carry Doric pilasters and pediment. The garden front to the south west is similar in design and decoration with a central entrance approached by a double flight of steps with wrought iron balustrades. The house is particularly noted for its Baroque interiors, plasterwork by Francesco Vassalli and the Adam style dining room.

Lady Elizabeth Blount had married the 9th baronet and she brought up their family here. Afterwards she attracted much attention as an exponent of the flat Earth theory, conducting convincing, but flawed experiments to prove the claim.

The Blounts were in residence until the mid-20th century. In 1962 the house was sold to Anthony Galliers Pratt, who carried out a total restoration, then again in 2018 for £10 million to the hedge-fund billionaire Chris Rokos.

== See also ==
- Grade I listed buildings in Shropshire
- Listed buildings in Cleobury Mortimer
