= Listed buildings in Cleobury Mortimer =

Cleobury Mortimer is a civil parish in Shropshire, England. It contains 77 listed buildings that are recorded in the National Heritage List for England. Of these, two are listed at Grade I, the highest of the three grades, three are at Grade II*, the middle grade, and the others are at Grade II, the lowest grade. The parish contains the market town of Cleobury Mortimer and the surrounding countryside. Most of the listed buildings are in the town, a high proportion of them along its main street named Ludlow Road, then High Street, Church Street, and Lower Street. Most of the listed buildings are houses and associated structures, cottages, shops and public houses, the others including a church and items in the churchyard, former schools, the remains of a wayside cross, a mounting block, a bank, a civic hall, a former toll house, a horse trough and drinking fountain, a war memorial, and two telephone kiosks. Outside the town, the listed buildings include a country house and its stable block, farmhouses, a milestone, and a bridge.

== Key ==
Grade	Criteria
I	Buildings of exceptional interest, sometimes considered to be internationally important
II*	Particularly important buildings of more than special interest
II	Buildings of national importance and special interest

== Buildings ==
Name and location	Photograph	Date	Notes	Grade
St Mary's Church; 52.37914°N 2.48037°W		12th century	Alterations and additions were made to the church until the 15th century, repairs were carried out in 1793 by Thomas Telford, and the church was restored in 1874–75 by George Gilbert Scott. It is built in sandstone with tile roofs. The church consists of a nave with a clerestory, north and south aisles, a north chapel, a south porch, a chancel, and a west steeple. The steeple has a tower with four stages, and a shingled broach spire that has a significant twist.	I
Sundial; 52.37902°N 2.48053°W	—	Medieval	Originally a churchyard cross, it has been remodelled to form a sundial and placed to the south of the tower of St Mary's Church. It is in stone, and the stump of the cross has been set in a hexagonal socket stone with an octagonal sundial on the top.	II
Remains of Wayside Cross; 52.37857°N 2.48204°W	—	Medieval	The weathered remains of the wayside cross are in ashlar stone. They consist of an octagonal slab base, on which is the lower section of the shaft that is about 0.5 metres (1 ft 8 in) high. The remains of the cross are also a Scheduled Monument.	II
Reaside Manor Farmhouse; 52.36430°N 2.47910°W		Late 16th to early 17th century	A manor house, later a private house, it is in stone with a string course and a tile roof. There are two storeys, an attic and a basement, and an H-shaped plan, consisting of a four-bay main range and three-bay cross-wings. On the front is a gabled porch with a pointed arch, a chamfered surround, an armorial panel, and a hood mould, and a doorway with a moulded surround. The windows are mullioned or mullioned and transomed.	II*
6 and 7 Church Street; 52.37883°N 2.48019°W	—	17th century	Shops with living accommodation that were altered in the 19th and 20th centuries, they are rendered and have a tile roof. There are two storeys, a two-bay central range, and two cross-wings. The ground floor contains modern shop fronts. In the central range are two gabled half-dormers, the right wing contains a canted bay window, and in the left wing is a sash window.	II
44 and 45 High Street; 52.37860°N 2.48334°W	—	17th century	A pair of shops with living accommodation above that were refronted in the 19th century. They are in brick with dentil course eaves and a tile roof, one storey and attics. The left shop has a 19th-century shop front with canted windows and a central door, and the shop on the right has a 20th-century shop front. In the attic are four gabled dormers.	II
11 and 12 Lower Street; 52.38106°N 2.47747°W		17th century	A house, extended in the 19th century and divided into two dwellings, the earlier part is timber framed on a plinth of brick and stone, the extensions are in brick and stone, and the roof is tiled. There is one storey and attics, two gables, and an extension at each end. The left house has a small canted bay window, above the door is a projecting canopy, and the windows are casements.	II
23 and 24 Lower Street; 52.38119°N 2.47764°W		17th century	A pair of houses that were refronted in the 19th century, they are rendered at the front, in stone on the side, and have exposed timber framing in the gable. The roof is tiled, there is one storey and attics, and a front of three bays. On the front are two doorways, one with a segmental head, three casement windows, two with segmental heads, and three gabled dormers. Steps with railings lead up to the door on the right.	II
11 and 12 The Hurst; 52.38093°N 2.48003°W	—	17th century	Two houses, later combined into one, in stone with brick dressings, exposed timber framing with brick infill in the left gable, and tile roofs. The left house has two storeys, the right house one storey and an attic. The windows, which are casements, and the doorway have segmental heads, and in the attic of the right house is a gabled dormer.	II
14 The Hurst; 52.38084°N 2.47984°W	—	17th century	A stone house that has a timber framed gable with brick infill, and a tile roof. It has a single storey with an attic, a single bay, and extension in brick and stone to the right. In the front is a doorway, a casement window to the right, and a gabled dormer above.	II
Barn behind 34–37 Lower Street; 52.38126°N 2.47968°W	—	17th century	The barn is partly in stone and partly timber framed on a stone plinth, with some weatherboarding, and has a metal corrugated roof. It has three bays, and in the east gable end are quoins and ventilation slits.	II
King's Arms Hotel; 52.37877°N 2.48037°W		17th century	The hotel was remodelled in the 18th century. It is partly timber framed and partly in brick, on a rendered plinth, with bands, dentil course eaves, and a tile roof. There are three storeys, six bays, and gabled extensions at the rear. In the ground floor is a doorway with pilasters, a fanlight, and a corniced entablature, and to the right is a carriage entrance. In the lower two floors the windows are mullioned and transomed, and in the top floor they are casements. At the rear is exposed timber framing.	II
Royal Fountain Inn; 52.37921°N 2.47958°W		17th century	The public house was altered in the 19th century and extended in the 20th century. It is in brick with dentil course eaves at the front and timber framed at the rear, and has a tile roof. There are two storeys and four bays, the roof stepped up over a segmental-headed carriage entrance on the right. On the front are three box bay windows, a central doorway with a canopy, and another doorway to the left. The windows are casements.	II
Upper Dudnill Farmhouse; 52.36912°N 2.51837°W	—	1672	The farmhouse is partly timber framed with brick and rendered infill, and partly in stone, and has a tile roof. It consists of an original timber framed range of two bays with two storeys and an attic, containing a mullioned window, to the left is a timber framed extension of two bays with one storey and an attic, and containing a casement window and a gabled dormer, and further to the left is a stone extension with a plain doorway and a mullioned window.	II
Mounting block 52.37858°N 2.48174°W		Late 17th or early 18th century (probable)	The mounting block is in stone, and consists of a flat slab on a plinth, with a flight of three stone steps on each side. It is used as the base for the sign of the Talbot Hotel.	II
4 Church Street; 52.37871°N 2.48054°W		1702	A shop and living accommodation in red brick on a rendered plinth, with quoins, a string course, and a hipped tile roof with a coped parapet. There are three storeys and a cellar, five bays, and a central gabled rear wing. In the right part of the ground floor is a 20th-century shop front, and to its left is a segmental-headed entrance. To the left of that is a doorway with pilasters, a fanlight and an entablature. The windows are casements, those in the ground floor under a cornice.	II
2 Church Street; 52.37858°N 2.48091°W		Early 18th century	A shop with living accommodation above, it is in brick and has a slate roof with coped gables. There are three storeys, five bays, and a gabled cross-wing at the rear. In the ground floor is a 19th-century shop front with a central doorway. In the middle floor are five sash windows with keyed lintels. Above them is a moulded modillioned cornice, and in the top floor are two horizontally-sliding sash windows.	II
Manor House; 52.37823°N 2.48293°W		Early 18th century	The manor house, later used for other purposes, is in brick on a moulded plinth, with moulded bands, moulded eaves, and a hipped tile roof. There are two storeys, attics and cellars, and a front of seven bays, the middle three bays projecting slightly. The central doorway has a moulded surround, fluted Doric pilasters, and an entablature with a cornice. The windows are sashes, and in the attic are box dormers. On the left side is a two-storey link to the stable block.	II*
Mawley Town Farmhouse; 52.38289°N 2.46214°W	—	Early 18th century	The farmhouse is in stone with some brick, and has moulded eaves and a tile roof with parapeted gables. There are two storeys and attics, a front of four bays, and a parallel range at the rear with two gabled wings. The windows are 20th-century casements, and in the attic are three gabled dormers.	II
The Vicarage; 52.37864°N 2.48074°W	—	Early 18th century	A vicarage, later a private house, it is in stone on a chamfered plinth, with moulded eaves, and a tile roof. There are two storeys, an attic and a cellar, a symmetrical front of five bays, and two gabled wings at the rear. The central doorway has fluted Doric pilasters, a round-headed fanlight and a broken pediment. The windows are sashes with moulded surrounds and keystones and in the attic are gabled dormers containing casements.	II*
Mawley Hall; 52.37440°N 2.45886°W		c. 1730	A country house that was restored in 1962. It is in red brick with sandstone dressings and a hipped slate roof. It has three storeys and a basement, a front of nine bays and sides of seven bays. There are giant Roman Doric pilasters at the corners, and flanking the central three bays that have a moulded and dentilled cornice with a parapet above. The doorways have pilasters and broken pediments, and the windows are sashes with keystones and aprons.	I
Coach house, Mawley Hall; 52.37494°N 2.45823°W	—	c. 1730	The coach house is in red brick with stone dressings, quoins, a moulded corniced parapet with urns, and a hipped slate roof. It has two storeys and a front of nine bays, the middle three bays projecting forward and containing a portico. The windows are sashes, and at the rear are pedimented half-dormers. On the roof is an octagonal lantern containing a clock face and with a dome, a gilded ball finial, and a weathervane.	II
Lacon Childe School; 52.38017°N 2.48061°W		1740	The school, later used for other purposes, was extended to the sides in about 1890, and to the rear in about 1900. It is in stone with a cornice, and has a hipped tile roof. There are two storeys and attics, a main range of five bays, flanking recessed wings, a single-storey wing to the left, and ranges to the rear. The central doorway has a rosette architrave, a fascia, and an open pediment with a crest at the apex. The windows are sashes with keyblocks, and there are three gabled dormers. On the roof is an octagonal bell turret with a cupola roof, a ball finial, and a weathervane.	II
3 Barkers Lane; 52.38023°N 2.47875°W	—	18th century	A brick house with dentil course eaves, and a tile roof partly with coped parapeted gables. There are two storeys, and two parallel ranges, the rear range being the longer. The windows are sashes and above the doorway is a bracketed flat hood.	II
19 and 20 High Street; 52.37843°N 2.48195°W	—	18th century	A pair of shops with living accommodation above, originally timber framed and replaced in brick, with a stone coped parapet and a tile roof. There are three storeys and three bays. In the ground floor are two box bay windows with shop doors each under a moulded cornice, and between them is a doorway and a sash window. The upper floors also contain sash windows, all with lintels and raised keyblocks.	II
27 High Street; 52.37872°N 2.48148°W		18th century	A shop, later a house, in brick, partly roughcast, with a tile roof. It has a front range and a larger rear cross-wing, two storeys, and a front of two bays. There is a central doorway and the windows on the front are sashes, those in the ground floor with lintels and keyblocks. The windows at the rear are casements.	II
28 High Street; 52.37869°N 2.48157°W	—	18th century	A shop in brick at the front and stone at the rear, with a roof partly in slate and partly in tiles. It has two storeys and two bays. In the ground floor is a shop front with two box bay windows flanking a doorway, and there is an arched entrance to the right. The upper floor contains casement windows.	II
30a, 30, 31, 31a, 31b and 32 High Street; 52.37863°N 2.48194°W	—	18th century	A pair of houses converted into flats, they are in brick with corbelled dentil course eaves and a tile roof with coped gables. There are two storeys and an attic, a front range and a rear wing on the left. In the ground floor are three canted bay windows, and three doorways. The upper floor contains mullioned and transomed windows with keystones and lattice glazing, and in the attic are five gabled dormers.	II
67, 68 and 69 High Street; 52.37840°N 2.48632°W	—	18th century	A group of three houses. Nos. 68 and 69 face the road, they are in stone, and have one storey and attics. No. 67 is a cross-wing at the rear on the right; it is in brick and has two storeys. The roofs are tiled, and the windows are casements, and there is an extension to the right of No. 68. In the attics are gabled dormers.	II
13 The Hurst; 52.38088°N 2.47993°W	—	18th century	The house, which has an earlier core, is in brick on the front, stone at the rear, and has a parapet and a tile roof, partly hipped. The front has three storeys and one bay, and a doorway with a pilastered surround. The windows on the front are sashes with stone lintels, and projecting keystones with moulded caps, and at the side and rear are casement windows.	II
Stable Block, Manor House; 52.37824°N 2.48265°W	—	18th century	The stable block and coach house have been converted for residential use. The building is in brick on a stone plinth, with bands, a moulded eaves cornice, and a tile roof with coped gables and ball-head finials. It has one storey and an attic, the windows are casements, and in the attic are gabled dormers.	II
The Redfern Hotel; 52.38080°N 2.47807°W		Mid 18th century	A house, later a hotel, it has a brick front and west side, and is in stone at the east side and the rear, with corbelled eaves and a tile roof. There are two storeys and an attic, and a front of three bays. In the centre is a doorway with a pedimented canopy, and the windows are casements with stone lintels and raised keyblocks.	II
1 Church Street; 52.37854°N 2.48105°W	—	Late 18th century	A shop with living accommodation above, it is in brick with a slate roof. There are three storeys, three bays, and the left end is canted. In the ground floor is a modern shop front, and above are sash windows, those in the middle floor with segmental arches. In the canted part of the wall is a plaque.	II
15 Church Street; 52.37883°N 2.48091°W	—	Late 18th century	A house, later a shop, it is in red brick with bands, and has a tile roof with coped gables. There are two storeys and an attic, a front range and a rear wing, and a front of three bays. In the ground floor is a 20th-century shop front, the upper floor contains sash windows with diapering between them, and in the attic is a gabled dormer.	II
16 Church Street; 52.37877°N 2.48106°W	—	Late 18th century	A house, later two shops, it was partly rebuilt in the 19th century. The building is in brick, rendered at the rear, and has a tile roof with a coped rear gable. There are two storeys and attics, a front range and a rear gabled extension, and four bays. In the ground floor are 20th-century shop fronts, the upper floor contains sash windows, and in the attic are two gabled dormers.	II
17 Church Street; 52.37872°N 2.48119°W	—	Late 18th century	A brick house with a band, rendered at the rear, and a tile roof with a coped rear gable. There are two storeys and attics, a front range and a rear gabled extension, and three bays. The central doorway has pilasters, a fanlight, an entablature, and a flat corniced canopy. The windows are sashes, and there is a doorway to an entry on the right with a segmental head.	II
11 and 12 High Street; 52.37842°N 2.48397°W		Late 18th century	A pair of brick houses with moulded eaves and a tile roof. They have two storeys and attics, a front range of two bays, rear gabled wings, and in addition No. 11 has a single-storey rear wing. The doorways have gabled canopies, the windows are sashes with moulded surrounds and keystones, and there are two gabled dormers.	II
14 High Street; 52.37844°N 2.48374°W		Late 18th century	A house, later a shop, in brick with corbelled eaves and a tile roof. There are two storeys and an attic, a front of one bay, and a single-storey rear wing. In the ground floor is a shop front with a bracketed fascia, and a doorway to the left. The upper floor contains a sash window with a raised keyblock, and on the side and at the rear are casement windows.	II
16 High Street; 52.37841°N 2.48242°W		Late 18th century	A shop with living accommodation above, it is in brick with corbelled eaves and a tile roof. There are two storeys and an attic, and a front of two bays. In the ground floor are two shop bay windows flanking a doorway, all under a hipped roof, and to the right is another doorway. The upper floor contains two casement windows with segmental heads, and in the attic are two gabled dormers.	II
25 and 26 High Street; 52.37849°N 2.48124°W	—	Late 18th century	A pair of shops with living accommodation above in brick on a rendered plinth, with dentil course eaves and a tile roof. There are three storeys, an attic and cellar, a front of three bays, and a rear cross-wing. No. 25 has two bays, and in the ground floor is a shop front including a canted bay window, all under a fascia. No. 26 has one narrow bay with a shop door and window in the ground floor. The upper floors contain sash windows with moulded keyblocks.	II
42 High Street; 52.37865°N 2.48313°W	—	Late 18th century	A brick house with dentil eaves and a hipped tile roof. It has three storeys and three bays. The entrance is to the left with a segmental-arched doorway, and the windows are sashes, in the lower two floors with keyed lintels and moulded raised keyblocks.	II
48 High Street; 52.37860°N 2.48364°W	—	Late 18th century	A shop, then a house, rendered at the front, in brick at the rear, with a parapeted front and gables, and a slate roof. There are three storeys, two bays, and a gabled rear extension on the left. In the ground floor are angled bay windows, the middle floor contains sash windows, and in the top floor are casement windows.	II
34–37 Lower Street; 52.38063°N 2.47882°W	—	Late 18th century	A terrace of four houses in brick on a rendered plinth at the front, in stone on the side and rear, with dentil course eaves and a tile roof. There are three storeys and a front of five bays. In the centre is a passageway door with a segmental head, there are five canted bay windows, and the windows are casements, those in the middle floor with segmental heads.	II
Hay Bridge; 52.36008°N 2.52765°W		Late 18th century	The bridge carries a road over Mill Brook. It consists of a single brick span with stone abutments, and has a string course, and stone parapets. The approach retaining walls are splayed and end in piers.	II
Langland House; 52.38052°N 2.47902°W		Late 18th century	A pair of houses in brick at the front and in stone at the sides and rear, with dentil course eaves and a tile roof, partly hipped. There are three storeys, each house has three bays, and there is canted corner and a cross-wing at the left gable end. Each house has a central doorway with Tuscan columns, a fanlight, and an open pediment. Flanking the doorway of the right house are single-storey bow windows, the other windows on the front are sashes, and in the cross-wing they are casements.	II
Milestone; 52.37102°N 2.44343°W	—	Late 18th century	The milestone is on the northeast side of the B4202 road. It is in ashlar stone and has a rectangular section and a rounded head. Its destination plaque is missing.	II
The Bell Inn; 52.38073°N 2.47823°W		Late 18th century	The public house is in stone with corbelled brick eaves on the front, and a tile roof. It has one storey and an attic, and an L-shaped plan, with a main range and a cross-wing at the rear. There are two doorways, one with a canopy, a canted bay window, a casement window, a sash window, and four gabled dormers.	II
36 High Street; 52.37864°N 2.48240°W	—	c. 1800	A shop with living accommodation above in brick with dentil course eaves and a slate roof. There are three storeys and three bays. In the centre of the ground floor is a doorway with a moulded surround, pilasters and a fanlight. To its left is a canted bay window, and to the right is a shop front with box bay windows. The upper floors contain sash windows.	II
8 Church Street; 52.37895°N 2.47993°W	—	Early 19th century	A house and office in red brick with a hipped tile roof. It has three storeys and an L-shaped plan with a two-bay front range and a gabled rear wing. On the front is a 20th-century doorway, and 20th-century windows, those in the lower two storeys with stone lintels and moulded raised keystones. In the right return is a doorway with a fanlight and an open pediment.	II
9 Church Street; 52.37899°N 2.47987°W	—	Early 19th century	A house in red brick at the front and stone at the rear, with a hipped tile roof. It has three storeys and an L-shaped plan with a two-bay front range and a hipped rear wing. On the front is a 20th-century doorway. The ground floor contains sash windows, in the upper floors the windows are modern, and the windows in the lower two storeys have stone lintels and moulded raised keystones.	II
10 Church Street; 52.37905°N 2.47976°W	—	Early 19th century	A brick house with dentil course eaves and a roof of slate at the front and tile at the rear. There are three storeys with a two-bay front range and a rear cross-wing gable. The doorway has a plain surround, to the right is a 20th-century bow window, and at the left is a door to an entry. The other windows are sashes with stone lintels. The rear wing contains 20th-century casement windows.	II
11 and 12 Church Street; 52.37910°N 2.47969°W		Early 19th century	A pair of brick shops with living accommodation, they have dentil course eaves and a roof of slate at the front and tile at the rear. There are three storeys and a two-bay front. No. 11 to the right has a 19th-century shop front with a curved fascia and a door with a fanlight. No. 12 has a bow window with a bowed fascia and fluted architraves. Above the door is a canopy, and the windows in the upper floors are sashes.	II
14 Church Street; 52.37931°N 2.47949°W	—	Early 19th century	A brick house with dentil course eaves and a tile roof. There are two storeys and an attic, and a symmetrical front of three bays. In the centre is a round-headed doorway with a fanlight, and the windows are sashes with segmental-headed lintels.	II
18 Church Street; 52.37868°N 2.48128°W		Early 19th century	A house and a shop in brick with a moulded string course, a slate roof, partly hipped, and gables with bargeboards. There are two storeys and attics, and a front of three bays, canted in the left corner. Most windows are sashes, and there are two Venetian windows. The house has a central doorway, and there is a shop doorway in the corner, both with round heads and keyblocks. To the right of the shop door is a shop front.	II
4 High Street; 52.37820°N 2.48614°W	—	Early 19th century	A stone house with cogged brick eaves and a slate roof. There are two storeys and a symmetrical front of three bays. The central doorway has pilasters and a corniced hood, and the windows are sashes, those in the ground floor having segmental heads.	II
13 High Street; 52.37845°N 2.48384°W	—	Early 19th century	A shop, later a house, in brick with a moulded cornice on brackets, moulded brick eaves, and a slate roof. There are three storeys and two bays. In the ground floor is a shop front with two canted bay windows flanking a doorway, and above them is a corniced canopy. To the left is an arched doorway with a keystone, and above it is an ornamental stuccoed panel decorated with a draped shall. The windows are sashes, those in the middle floor with corniced heads on brackets.	II
17 High Street; 52.37841°N 2.48233°W		Early 19th century	A shop with living accommodation above in brick, rendered at the rear, with dentil course eaves and a slate roof. There are three storeys and two bays. In the ground floor is a box bay window with a shop doorway and another doorway to the right, all under a fascia. The middle floor contains sash window, in the top floor are replacement windows, and at the rear are casement windows and a half-dormer.	II
18 High Street; 52.37841°N 2.48216°W		Early 19th century	A shop with living accommodation above in brick, with dentil course eaves and a tile roof. There are two parallel ranges; the front range has three storeys and four bays, and the rear range has two storeys. In the ground floor is a shop front consisting of three box bay windows, doorways, a small window to the right, and a moulded rendered fascia. In the upper floors are sash windows, those in the middle floor with lintels and moulded keyblocks.	II
21, 22 and 22A High Street; 52.37844°N 2.48178°W	—	Early 19th century	Three shops with living accommodation above in brick, the side gable rendered, with dentil course eaves and a roof slated at the front and tiled at the rear. There are two storeys, three bays, and two rear gabled extensions. No. 21 has a 19th-century shop front with a box bay window, a doorway with pilasters, and a corniced fascia above them. The other shops have 20th-century fronts, and in the upper floor are sash windows.	II
23 High Street; 52.37844°N 2.48154°W		Early 19th century	A shop with living accommodation above in brick on a rendered plinth, with stone at the sides and rear, and a tile roof. There are two storeys and an attic, and a front of three bays. In the ground floor is a canted bay window to the right, and an entrance to the left, all under a fascia. The upper floor contains three sash windows with keyed lintels, in the attic are four gabled dormers, and at the rear are casement windows with segmental arches.	II
40 High Street; 52.37863°N 2.48285°W	—	Early 19th century	A shop, later a house, in rendered brick at the front, in stone at the rear, on a plinth, with a dentil course eaves and a tile roof. There are two storeys and an attic, and four bays. In the ground floor is a doorway on the left and a box bay window on the right. Above are multi-paned windows, and in the attic are two gabled dormers.	II
41 High Street; 52.37862°N 2.48298°W	—	Early 19th century	A house with a core possibly from the 17th century, it is in red brick on a plinth, with bands, a dentil course eaves, and a tile roof with coped gables. There are two storeys and an attic, and a front of two bays. In the ground floor is a central doorway flanked by sash windows, the upper floor contains casement windows, and in the attic are two gabled dormers.	II
Gatepiers to south-east of Assembly Rooms; 52.37892°N 2.48060°W	—	Early 19th century	A pair of sandstone gate piers with chamfered plinths, octagonal shafts, cornices and pyramidal caps. Attached to the north pier are iron railings stretching for 2 metres (6 ft 7 in).	II
Lloyd's Bank; 52.37863°N 2.48269°W	—	Early 19th century	The bank is in rendered brick on a plinth, with string courses and a slate roof that has gables with bargeboards. There are three storeys and three bays. In the ground floor is a central doorway with a moulded surround, pilasters and an entablature. The windows are sashes with moulded architraves.	II
Old Lion Public House; 52.38085°N 2.47845°W		Early 19th century	The public house has a medieval core, it was refronted in the early 19th century, and a gabled cross-wing was added to the right in the late 19th century. It is in red brick, and has cogged eaves and roofs partly of slate and partly of tile. There are two storeys and an attic, and an L-shaped plan, the main range having three bays. In the main range the windows are sashes, and in the gable end are two five-light mullioned and transomed windows. Above the door is a round-headed fanlight.	II
Assembly Rooms, railings and gatepier 52.37894°N 2.48076°W	—	1842	Originally a market hall, it was altered and extended in 1875, and has since been used as a civic hall. It is in stone with blue engineering brick in the extension, and has a slate roof with decorative bargeboards and a fascia. The building has two storeys, with the gable towards the street, and sides of four bays. In the ground floor the openings have pointed heads, and in the upper floor are sash windows, all with hood moulds. In front of it is an octagonal sandstone gate pier with a pyramidal cap joined to the assembly rooms by iron railings.	II
Beaconsfield House; 52.37847°N 2.48138°W	—	Mid 19th century	A shop with living accommodation above with an earlier core. It is rendered with a gabled brick rear wing, and has a tile roof. The building has a plinth, a rusticated ground floor, moulded string courses, a modillion eaves cornice, and a parapet. There are three storeys and four bays. In the right bay is a round-headed doorway with Tuscan pilasters and a fanlight. The windows are sashes; in the ground floor they have raised keyed and stepped lintels, in the middle floor they have plain architraves and corniced heads on console brackets, and in the top floor they have moulded architraves and bracketed sills.	II
Churchyard wall 52.37893°N 2.48041°W	—	Mid 19th century	The wall is in stone, and is mainly a retaining wall. It is to the southwest of St Mary's Church, and runs from the base of the steps to the west towards the Assembly Rooms. Inset into the wall is a panel dating from the 12th or 13th century.	II
Wall and gatepiers, Manor House; 52.37850°N 2.48288°W		19th century	The wall encloses the garden at the front of the house. It is in brick on a chamfered stone plinth with stone coping and railings. There are three openings flanked by gate piers. Each pier has a stone shaft with blue brick infilling, on a moulded chamfered plinth, with a moulded corniced pyramidal cap.	II
Wall northwest of Manor House; 52.37849°N 2.48338°W	—	19th century	Originally the garden wall of the Manor House, it is a tall brick wall with projecting piers and flat stone coping.	II
Talbot Hotel; 52.37865°N 2.48176°W		19th century	The remodelling of a building with a probable 17th-century core. It is timber framed with render at the front painted to resemble timber framing. There are two storeys and attics, a front with four gabled bays, and an extensive rear wing. In the ground floor is a pilastered porch, bay windows, and a carriageway to the right. The first floor has a balcony with cast iron railings, and the windows are sashes.	II
Turnpike Cottage; 52.37834°N 2.48887°W		19th century	A toll house, later a private house, it is in stone with a hipped slate roof. It has a rectangular plan with two canted corners, two storeys, and sides of two bays. The doorway is in one of the canted corners, with a blank panel above. The windows are casements, those in the ground floor with segmental heads.	II
Old School; 52.38080°N 2.48160°W		1863	The school was designed by G. E. Street it was extended in 1893, and has since been converted for residential use. It is in stone, the extension is in brick and the roofs are slated with coped gables and decorative ridge tiles. The plan consists of a main range with a cross-wing at each end and a parallel range to the rear. On the front are three gables in the main range, a larger projecting gable in the left cross-wing, and in front of the right cross-wing is a circular turret with a conical roof.	II
Horse trough and drinking fountain 52.37858°N 2.48198°W		1900	The drinking fountain is in marble, and consists of a cylindrical column with incised bands with a cupola in ashlar stone. On the pavement side is a drinking bowl, and on the road side is an inscription. The trough is on the road side, and is in stone with moulded sides.	II
War memorial 52.37895°N 2.48044°W		c. 1920	The war memorial is in the churchyard of St Mary's Church, to the south of the church. It is in stone and consists of a Celtic cross on a tapering shaft, set on a two-stage plinth. There are inscriptions and the names of those lost in the two World Wars on the lower part of the shaft, on the plinth, and on a plaque in front of the plinth.	II
Telephone kiosk, High Street; 52.37858°N 2.48193°W		1935	A K6 type telephone kiosk, designed by Giles Gilbert Scott. Constructed in cast iron with a square plan and a dome, it has three unperforated crowns in the top panels.	II
Telephone kiosk, Lower Street; 52.38039°N 2.47917°W		1935	A K6 type telephone kiosk, designed by Giles Gilbert Scott. Constructed in cast iron with a square plan and a dome, it has three unperforated crowns in the top panels.	II
