= Sodington Hall =

Country house in Mamble, Worcestershire, England

Coordinates: 52.336°N 2.452°W

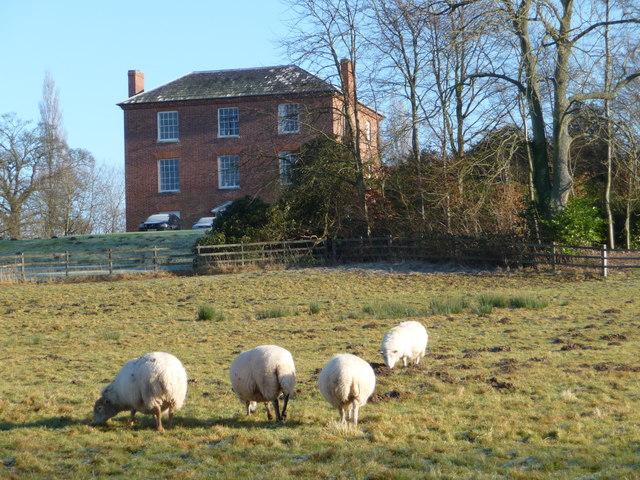
Sodington Hall.

Sodington Hall is an early 19th-century country house in the parish of Mamble in Worcestershire, England. The Grade II listed building was described by Nikolaus Pevsner as "neat and modest" and by James Lees-Milne in the Shell Worcestershire Guide as a "red brick dolls house".

It sits on the site of a Schedule A monument with a Grade II listed bridge in the grounds surrounded by a moat and stands elevated and secluded yet with far reaching views over border countryside to the Welsh mountains.

The site is believed to date back to a Roman fortification at around AD 418. The earliest modern records of Sodington describe it as a fortified house with four drawbridges over its moat, held by Sir Richard de Sodington in the mid 13th Century, when it passed by marriage to the Blounts – a Norman dynasty renowned for their loyalty to the Crown and their robust attitude towards negotiations with the Welsh.

For nearly 400 years Sodington remained the principal seat of one of England’s most prominent families – Sir Walter Blount even appears as a leading character in Shakespeare’s Henry IV. Then, in approximately 1646, it was burnt by Parliamentary forces, in reprisal for the refusal by Sir Walter Blount, 1st Baronet (1594-1654) to grant them access to his weapons forge. He was sent to the Tower of London. The estate of Sodington was confiscated by Parliament in 1652 but was returned intact on the Restoration of the monarchy in 1660. Local legend holds that the Yew tree close to the house was planted in 1662 to commemorate the visit of King Charles II to Sodington. The present house was built in 1806-7 and it was while excavating its foundations that the evidence of Roman settlement was discovered in the form of a Roman pavement and a beautifully engineered water pipe of interlocking ceramic sections leading from the spring at Clows Top. Sodington Hall remained a seat of the Blount family until 1958, when it was sold to Richard Jensen, the manufacturer of the Jensen Interceptor motor car at West Bromwich. The original moat surrounds the house today, crossed by listed Late Georgian bridges. The site within the moat is a Scheduled Ancient Monument.

The manor of Sodington came to the Blount family (later Blount baronets) in the 14th century when Walter Blount married the heiress Johanna de Sodington. The manor house occupied a moated site and was said to have four drawbridges. The Blounts were Roman Catholics and strongly supported the Crown during the Civil War and their house was badly damaged by Parliamentary forces. Sir Walter Blount Bt was imprisoned by Parliament in 1645. His estate was sequestered and was only recovered by his family after the English Restoration.

The Blounts then lived at nearby Mawley, Shropshire where Sir Edward Blount, a wealthy coal owner and iron master, built a substantial mansion, Mawley Hall, in about 1730. The Sodington manor house was demolished in about 1807 and was replaced on the same site by the present brick built plain Georgian style, three storeyed, three bayed house. The house has undergone various changes over the years with two wings to the rear, one having been removed in the early 20th century and subsequently rebuilt. The Hall is undergoing a slow and detailed restoration after having been empty for many years. The house sits high up on an old fortified site.

Sodington Hall attracted media attention when the American actor Tom Cruise expressed interest in buying it.
