= Church of St Peter and St Paul, Ermington =

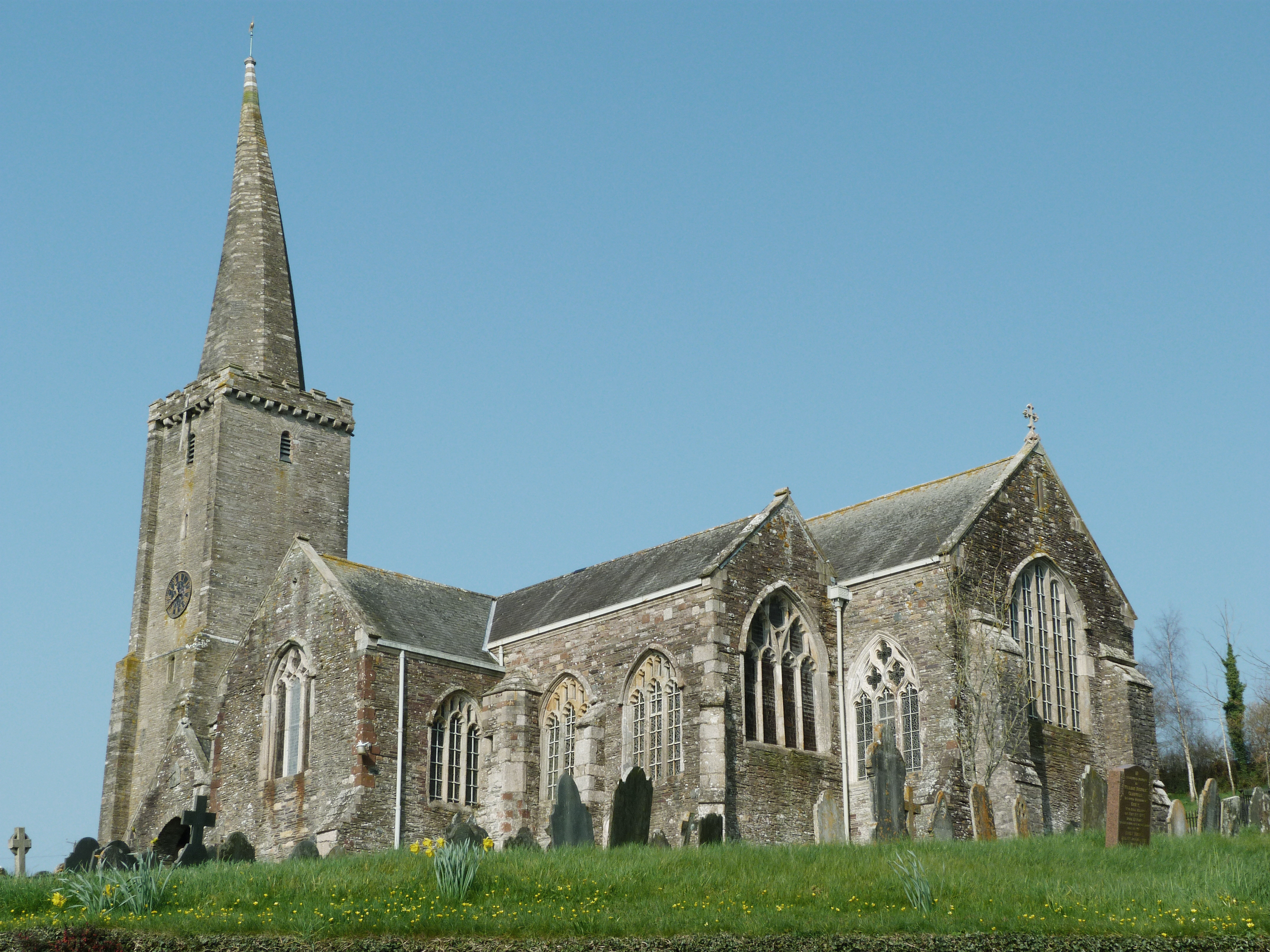
- Church of St Peter and St Paul, Ermington

- 50.363130729696884°N 3.9152517158958604°W
- OS grid reference: SX6383553219
- Country: England
- Denomination: Church of England
- Website: www.achurchnearyou.co

History
- Status: Operational
- Dedication: St Peter and St Paul

Architecture
- Heritage designation: Grade I listed
- Architect: J. D. Sedding
- Style: Gothic and Gothic Revival
- Years built: 11th, 13th, 14th, 15th, & 19th century

Administration
- Province: Canterbury
- Diocese: Exeter
- Parish: Ermington

Clergy
- Vicar: Revd David Sayle

The Church of St Peter and St Paul in Ermington, Devon, is a parish church in the Church of England. It has a crooked spire and is Grade I listed.

== Building ==
The church was mostly built across the 13th, 14th, and 15th centuries, with some features surviving from the 11th century Norman church, mainly in the stonework between the porch and the tower. The architecture is broadly English Perpendicular Gothic. Extensive Victorian restorations were carried out by the Arts and Crafts architect J. D. Sedding in 1889, funded by the Mildmays of Flete.

The south door to the church was constructed in the 15th century and features a massive moulded granite four-centred arch.

The crooked spire was built in the early 14th century and rebuilt in the 1850s retaining the original twist.

Inside, the church features a number of woodcarvings by Violet Pinwill dating from 1890 to 1945.

== Current day ==
Services are held every Sunday.
