= Mamble =

Village in Worcestershire, England

Coordinates: 52.3407°N 2.4566°W

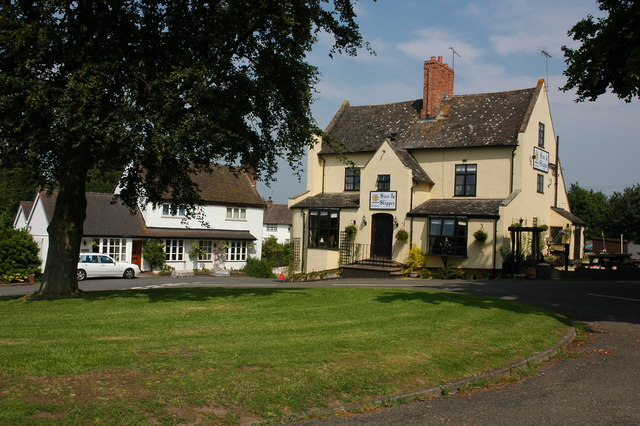
- Sun and Slipper, Mamble

- Location within Worcestershire
- Population: 284
- OS grid reference: SO689714
- Civil parish: Mamble
- District: Malvern Hills
- Shire county: Worcestershire
- Region: West Midlands
- Country: England
- Sovereign state: United Kingdom
- Post town: KIDDERMINSTER
- Postcode district: DY14
- Police: West Mercia
- Fire: Hereford and Worcester
- Ambulance: West Midlands
- UK Parliament: West Worcestershire

Mamble is a village and civil parish in the Malvern Hills District in the county of Worcestershire, England. It is located on the A456 between Bewdley and Tenbury Wells. Notable buildings include the 13th century sandstone church and the nearby 17th century Sun & Slipper Inn. The civil parish population was 284 at the 2021 census.

== History ==
The name Mamble possibly derives from the Old English mammehyll meaning 'breast shaped hill'.

Roman remains have been found in the area at Sodington Hall, and at the time of the Domesday Book the settlement was known as Mamele. In subsequent years Mamble parish was in the lower division of Doddingtree Hundred. The parish church of St John Baptist dates from about 1200 and has a wooden bell turret. The brick-built side chapel of the Blount family, formerly from Sodington Hall, was added in the 16th century but was unroofed in the mid-20th century and is now in ruins.

Although agriculture was always a major industry for the local inhabitants, coal mining was also important from the second half of the 18th century onwards, and the last local pits to the south-east of the village remained in operation until 1944. In the 1790s the Leominster Canal was opened in the area, which allowed coal to be brought down from the colliery by tramway and carried to Tenbury Wells and Herefordshire, but the canal was unprofitable and was closed in 1859.

There was once a greyhound coursing club in the village in the mid-19th century when races were run for a silver cup. Mamble is chiefly remembered today as the title of a 1915 poem by John Drinkwater speculating about what lay at the end of a turning that he never took:

The finger-post says Mamble,
and that is all I know,
of the narrow road to Mamble.
