= Crooked spire =

Type of tower

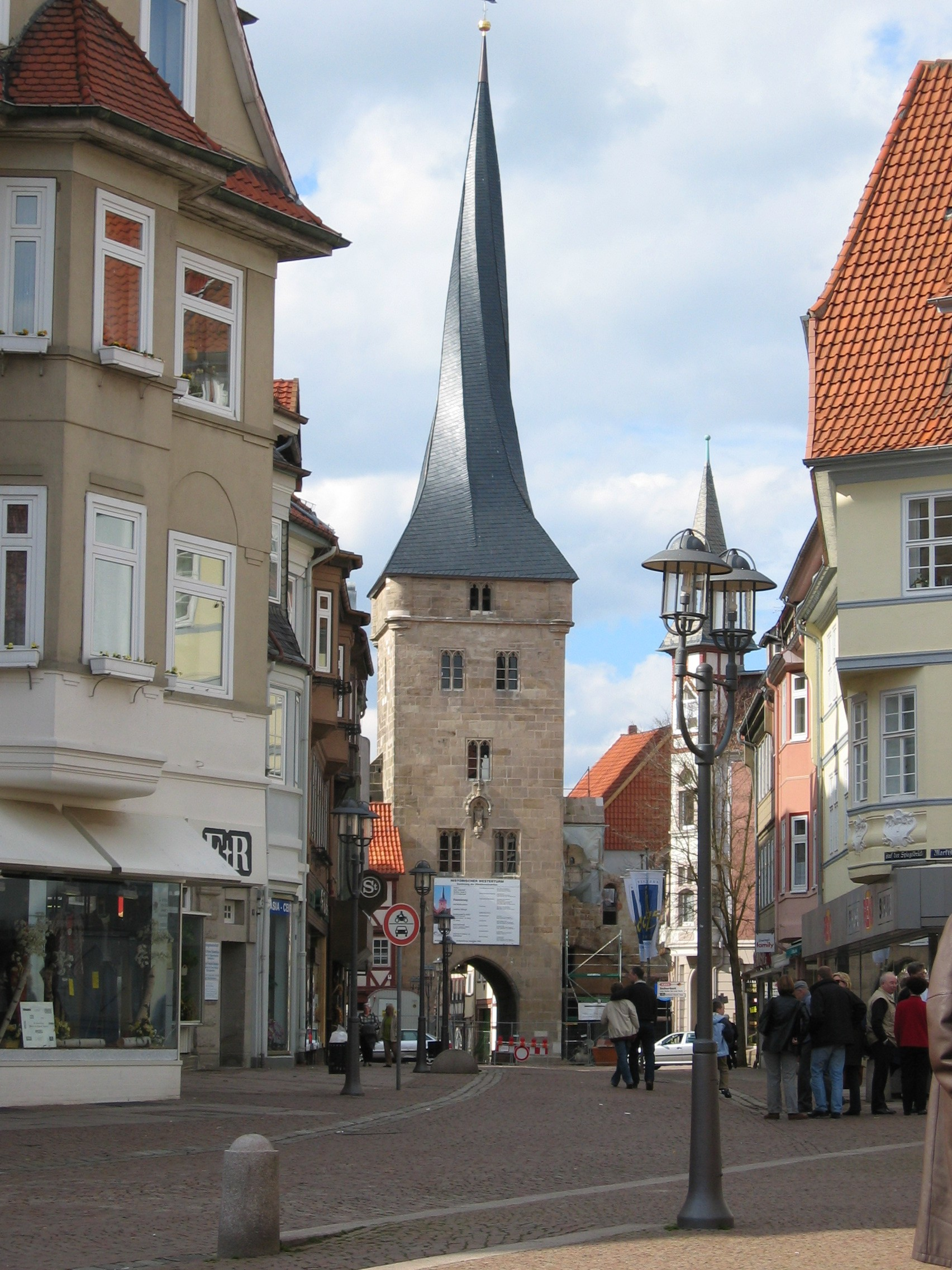
The old western town gate of Duderstadt in Germany.

A crooked spire, (also known as a twisted spire) is a tower showing a twist and/or a deviation from the vertical. A church tower usually consists of a square stone tower topped with a pyramidal wooden structure, the spire is usually cladded with slates or lead to protect the wood. Through accident or design the spire may contain a twist, or it may not point perfectly straight upwards. Some however have been built or rebuilt with a deliberate twist, generally as a design choice.

There are about a hundred bell towers of this type in Europe.

== Reasons for spires to twist and bend ==
Twisting can be caused by internal or external forces. Internal conditions, such as green or unseasoned wood, can cause some twisting until after about 50 years when fully seasoned. Also the weight of any lead used in construction can cause the wood to twist. Dry wood will shrink, causing further movement.

External forces, such as water ingress that causes rot, can cause partial collapse, resulting in tilting. Heat from the sun on one side can also cause movement. Earthquakes have also occasionally caused twisting. Subsidence can cause leaning. Strong winds have been blamed at times, but there is little evidence to back this up. Finally, weak design can be at fault, for instance with a lack of cross-bracing, resulting in the ability of the tower to move.

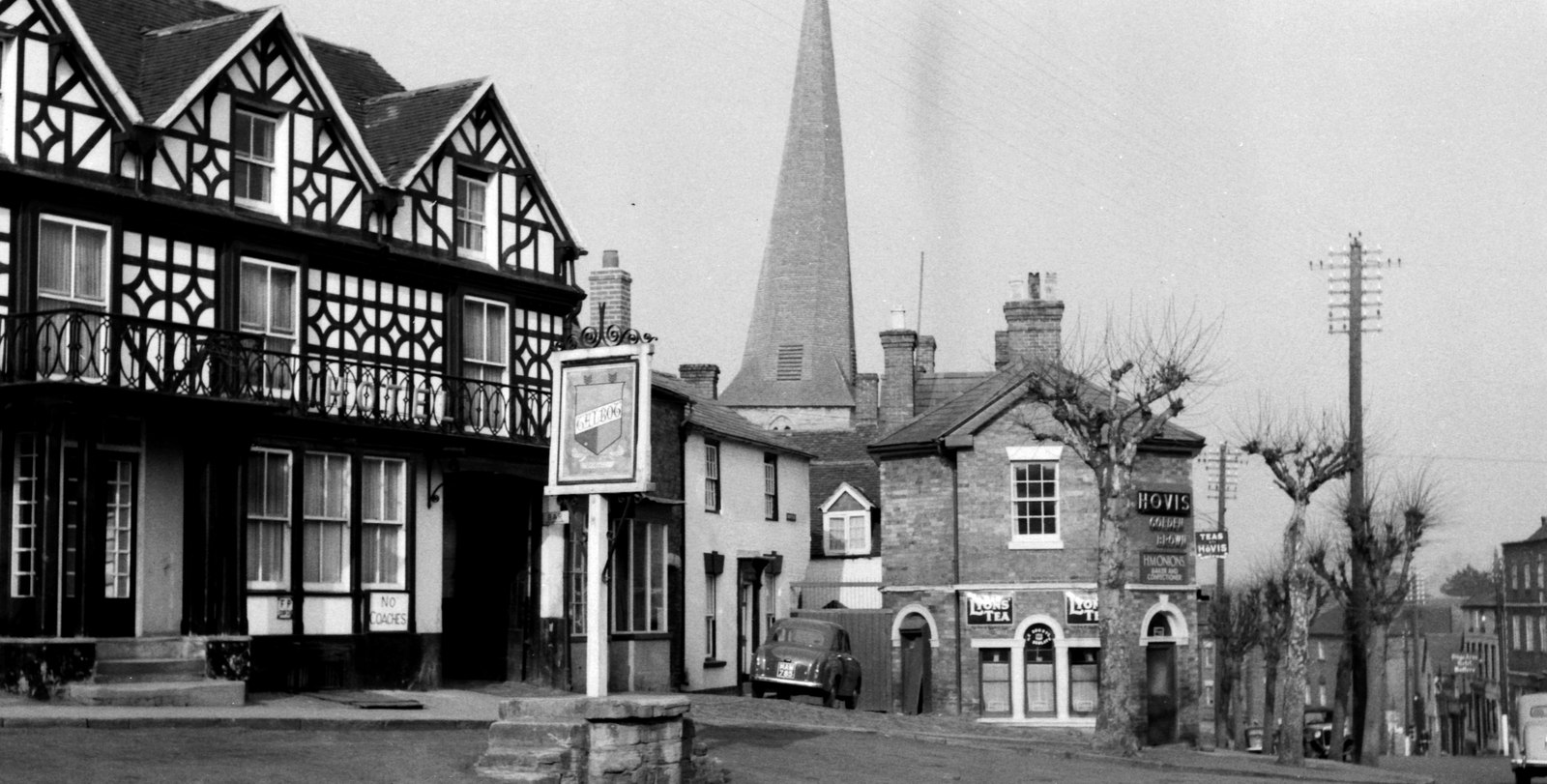
The crooked spire of St Mary's Church in Cleobury Mortimer.
