= Ermington, Devon =

Village in Devon, England

Coordinates: 50.361020°N 3.917140°W

Ermington
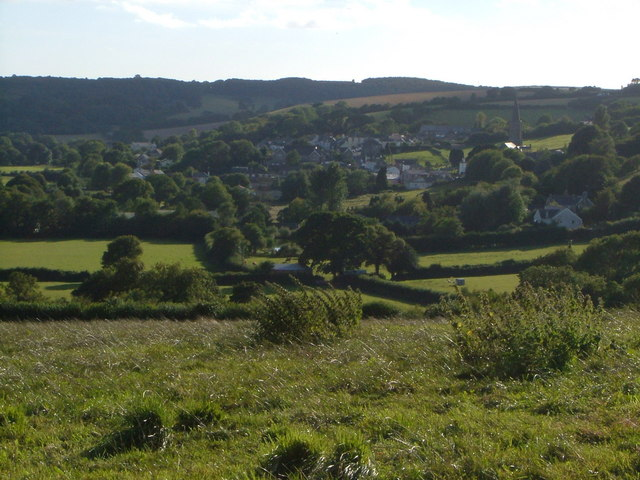
- Ermington as seen from West Strode Cross

- Location within Devon
- Population: 824 (2011)
- OS grid reference: SX637531
  - London: 183 mi (295 km)
- Civil parish: Ermington
- District: South Hams
- Shire county: Devon
- Region: South West
- Country: England
- Sovereign state: United Kingdom
- Post town: IVYBRIDGE
- Postcode district: PL21
- Dialling code: 01548
- Police: Devon and Cornwall
- Fire: Devon and Somerset
- Ambulance: South Western
- UK Parliament: South West Devon
- Website: Community page website

Ermington is a village and civil parish located approximately 2 miles (3.2 km) south of the town of Ivybridge in the county of Devon, England. The village is in the South Hams district and falls under the electoral ward of Ermington & Ugborough. It is twinned with the commune of Clécy, in Normandy, France and had a parish population of 824 at the 2011 census. It is known well for its crooked church spire, which a pub has been named after. It was home to Edmund Lockyer, who went to Australia and named a town, Ermington, in New South Wales.

== Etymology ==
Ermington takes its name from the River Erme, along with the Old English place-name elements -ing- and tůn ("estate, enclosure"). Thus it once meant "settlement on the River Erme". The name is first attested in the Domesday Book of 1086.

Near the boundary of the parish there is a place called Penquit (pronounced, at least in the 1930s, ['pænkɪt]), whose name is one of relatively few in English to derive from Common Brittonic, perhaps being in continuous use since the time of the kingdom of Dumnonia. The name Penquit is first attested in 1238, as Pencoyt; it derives from the words that survive in modern Welsh as penn ("head, top, summit, end") and coed ("wood"). Thus it once meant "end of the wood".

== History ==
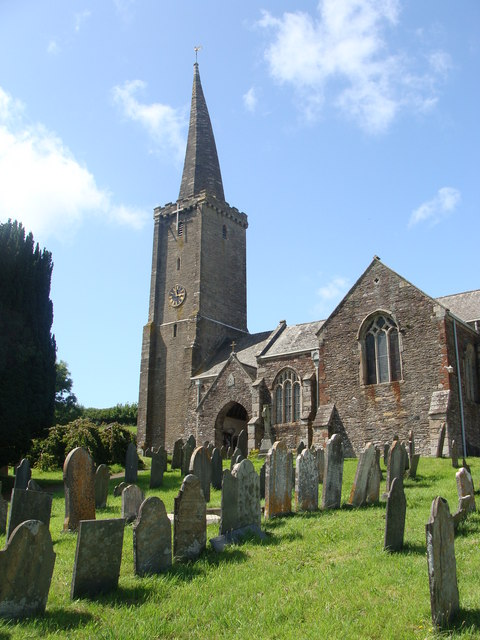
Church of St Peter and St Paul, Ermington; the crooked spire is apparent

Ermington appears in the Domesday Book as a royal manor. By 1270 the manor house of Strashleigh was the home of the Strashleigh family, also written Stretchleigh, until the heiress Christina Stretchleigh in 1560 married Sir Christopher Chudleigh, grandfather of the adventurer Sir John Chudleigh. Nearby Strode was inhabited by the Strode family from 1238 and probably earlier. Although, since the 15th century, their principal residence has been in Plympton. In the 14th century, its church, named after Saint Peter, was constructed and was later enlarged in the 15th century.

== Education ==
Ermington's only school is Ermington Community Primary School. It is a state-funded primary school (ages 5–11) following the National Curriculum. The school was first opened in 1879 and has been extended in 1997 and a double classroom was also extended in 1999. The school uniform colours are navy and grey, it has about 150 students, who are transferred to Ivybridge Community College, located about 2 miles (3.2 km) north, for secondary education at the end of year 6. Ermington Primary School is one of only four primary schools in the county of Devon to achieve 100% pass rates (level four and above according to the National Curriculum) in English, Maths and Science at the end of year 6 National Curriculum assessment "SATs". The village also has a small pre-school located within the primary school's grounds.

== Twin towns – sister cities ==
Ermington is twinned with:

- Clécy, France since 1980
