= St Mary's Church, Neen Savage =

Coordinates: 52.39303°N 2.48008°W

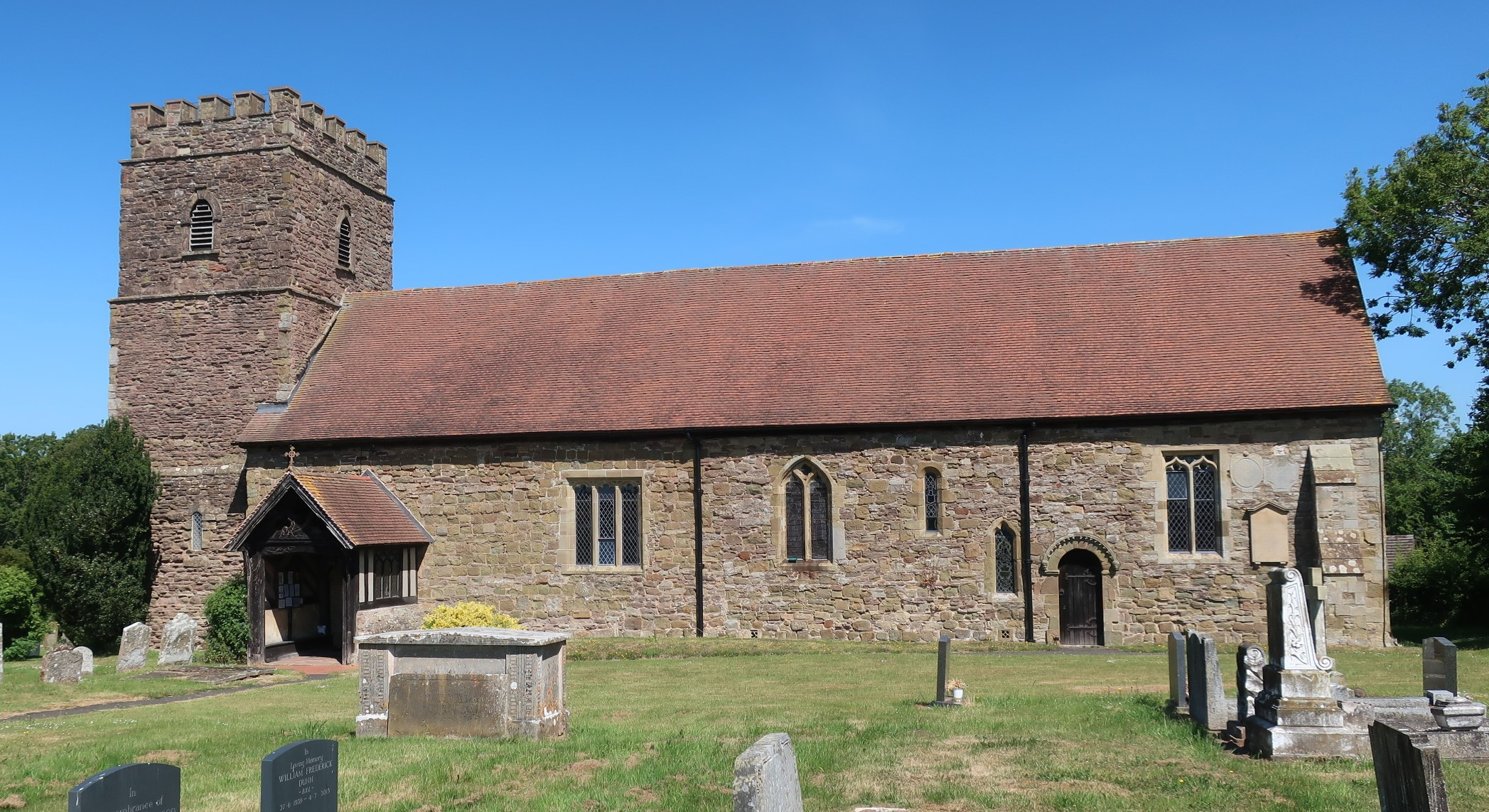
- St Mary's Church, Neen Savage, south front

- Location within Shropshire
- OS grid reference: SO 674 774
- Location: Neen Savage, Shropshire
- Country: England
- Denomination: Anglican
- Website: St Mary, Neen Savage

History
- Status: Parish church
- Founder: Hugh de Mortimer
- Dedication: Saint Mary
- Dedicated: Mary, Mother of Jesus
- Consecrated: Before 1179

Architecture
- Functional status: Active
- Heritage designation: Grade II*
- Designated: 9 November 1970
- Architectural type: Church
- Style: Norman

Administration
- Diocese: Hereford
- Archdeaconry: Ludlow
- Deanery: Ludlow
- Parish: Neen Savage

The Church of St. Mary is a Church of England parish church at Neen Savage in the Rea Valley, at the southern end of the English County of Shropshire. Pevsner describes St. Mary's as a complete Norman church with a long nave and a fine East triplet window. The building is Grade 2* listed.

== History ==
The present church on this site was built by Hugh de Mortimer just before 1179 and dedicated to St. Mary, a popular Norman dedication. However, the church stands inside an oval enclosure that is older than the present building and the Normans may have reused an existing site that was already sacred. Hugh built his church of local stone in three rapid phases. These happened so close together that most church experts say we might as well regard it as being built ‘all as one’. For some reason, they gave it an exceptionally long nave, and like all churches at the time it was rendered and whitewashed to protect the stone and make it appear ‘luminious’.

In 1179 this gleaming white church was gifted to Wigmore Abbey, who added what Pevsner describes as a 'fine E Triplet' and a priest's door with 'hoodmould of crocus-blossom type'. This is a late 12th century design also seen at St. Mary's Shrewsbury. Apart from some later tinkering with the windows and a Tudor porch, St. Mary's remains largely unchanged from this Norman original.

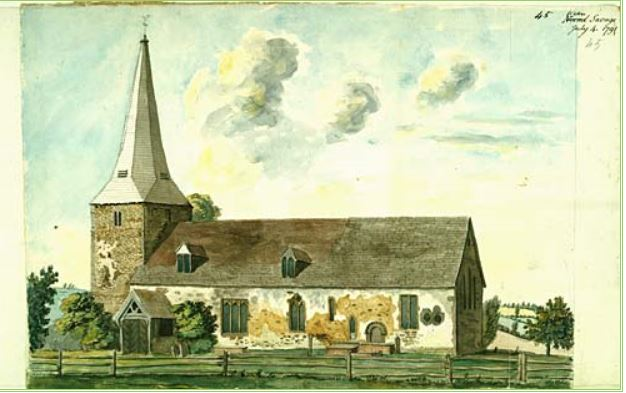
Photo of a watercolour showing St. Mary's spire. It was painted by te Rev Edward Williams and is dated 4 Jul 1791

In the 13th century wool wealth funded the addition of a timber spire to St. Mary's. It was one of a number that sprouted in the surrounding area, though they were not common elsewhere. At the time, wool from the Welsh Marches was the most prized in Europe. The Neen Savage spire met a dramatic end. Struck by lightning on 19 July 1825, it burnt down. The Rev. William Otter, vicar of the neighbouring parish of Kinlet wrote in his parish register: ‘July 19 - A tempest in the neighbourhood of Tenbury and Cleobury Mortimer. The electric fluid struck an Oak Tree at Kinlet and killed 5 sheep under it. Set fire to the wooden steeple of Neen Savage Church melting the Bells and threatening the destruction of the entire edifice.’

== Victorian Restoration ==
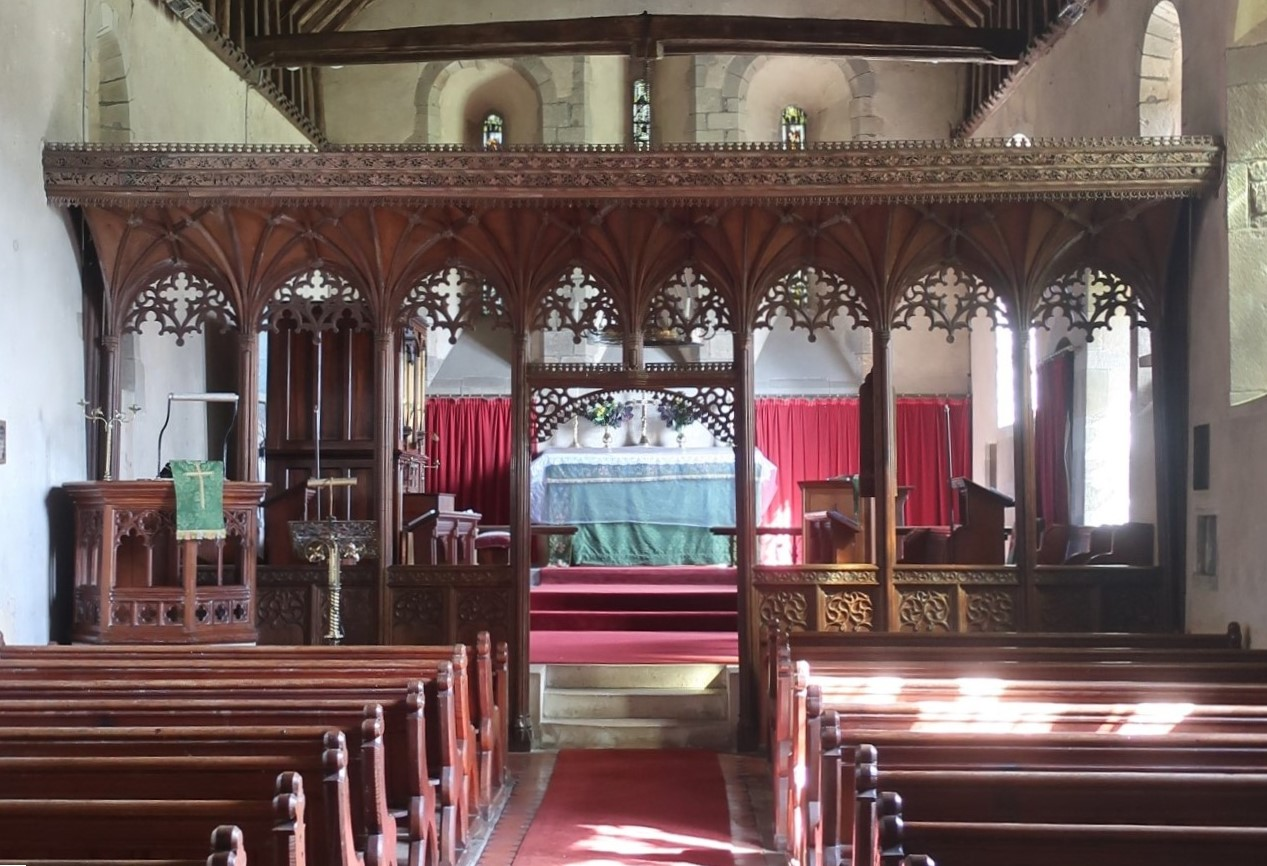
St. Mary's Church, Neen Savage, 16th century screen

With the disappearance of the steeple the building once again appeared largely as the Normans intended, although in common with most early churches the white render was removed from the walls during a Victorian Restoration. This restoration was masterminded by London Architect Sir Thomas Gordon, and the church's fine 16th century screen, which on the night of the fire had been ‘broken into pieces by persons who came to extinguish the flames’, was repaired and put back where it belonged.

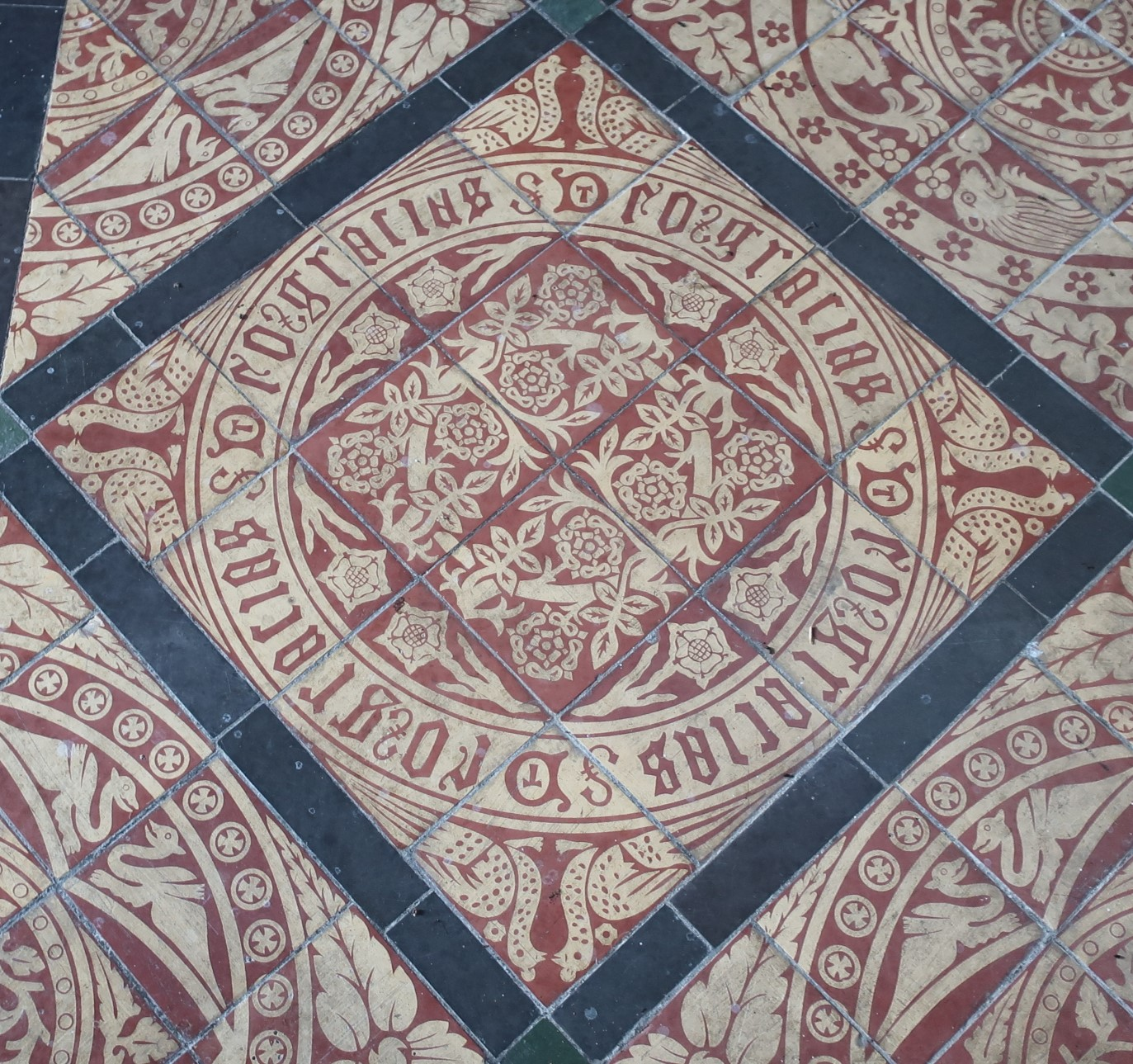
Godwin tiles, replicas of those in the finest medieval pavement in Wales

Architect Gordon laid a replica medieval tile pavement by Godwin of Lugwardine in the chancel. Godwin's tiles are replicas of those in the Presbytery pavement at St. David's Cathedral, the finest surviving Medieval pavement in Wales, on which he worked with Gilbert Scott for whom he was the 'tilemaker of choice'. The tiles feature medieval beasts, foliage and Latin texts.

The bells that melted in the fire were replaced by a new pair, a large tenor with a fine tone and a small Sanctus bell, cast by Rudhall of Gloucester in 1829. The organ is a rare instrument: only twelve of its type were ever made. It was built by Joseph W. Walker of London in 1853.

Dendrochronology dating in 2015 indicated felling dates for the roof timbers of AD 1412–1449, and for the porch of AD 1547–72.

== See also ==
- Listed buildings in Neen Savage
- Grade II* listed buildings in Shropshire
