= Listed buildings in Kinlet =

Kinlet is a civil parish in Shropshire, England. It contains 16 listed buildings that are recorded in the National Heritage List for England. Of these, two are listed at Grade I, the highest of the three grades, one is at Grade II*, the middle grade, and the others are at Grade II, the lowest grade. The parish contains the village of Kinlet and the surrounding countryside; all the listed buildings are scattered around the countryside. These consist of a 12th-century church and a cross base in the churchyard, a former country house and associated structures, smaller houses, farmhouses and cottages, and four milestones.

== Key ==
Grade	Criteria
I	Buildings of exceptional interest, sometimes considered to be internationally important
II*	Particularly important buildings of more than special interest
II	Buildings of national importance and special interest

== Buildings ==
Name and location	Photograph	Date	Notes	Grade
St John's Church; 52.42652°N 2.42694°W		12th century	The north aisle was added later in the 12th century, the south aisle and the tower in the 13th century, the chancel was rebuilt and the transepts were added in about 1320, the upper parts of the tower and the clerestory date from about 1500, and the church was restored by John Oldrid Scott in 1892–93. The church is built in stone with a timber framed clerestory, and consists of a nave, north and south narrow lean-to aisles, a south porch, north and south transepts, a chancel, and a west tower. The tower has lancet windows, a plain parapet, and a pyramidal roof. The east window has five lights.	I
Churchyard cross 52.42628°N 2.42689°W		Late medieval	The surviving base of the cross in the churchyard of St John's Church is in stone and has a square plan. It has four gables, each containing a kneeling recess of differing depth.	II
Earnwood; 52.42166°N 2.38784°W	—	17th century	The house was later altered and extended. The early part is timber framed, the later parts are in brick, the house is partly roughcast, and the roof is tiled. Part of it has two storeys, the other part has one storey and attics, and the house has a roughly U-shaped plan with projecting gabled wings. The windows are casements, and there are gabled dormers.	II
Hall Farm Cottages; 52.41173°N 2.39679°W	—	17th century	The cottages have been combined into one house. It has a timber framed core, encased or rebuilt in stone and brick, and a tile roof. There is one storey and an attic, the windows are casements, and there are gabled dormers.	II
Manor Holding; 52.39107°N 2.39678°W	—	17th century	The cottage was extended in the 19th century, it is timber framed with brick infill, and the roof is tiled. There are two storeys and two bays, and a single-storey extension to the right. The doorway has a moulded surround, and the windows are casements.	II
Silligrove; 52.39338°N 2.41967°W	—	17th century	A timber framed farmhouse with cruck construction, brick nogging and a tile roof. There are two storeys, and the windows are casements. Three cruck trusses have survived, one of which is exposed on the side facing the road.	II
Upper House Cottage; 52.41357°N 2.42564°W	—	17th century	The house consists of a gabled timber framed range with two bays, a brick range at right angles, and a lower extension with a projecting porch beyond that. The house has one storey and attics, and the extension has one storey. The windows are casements, and there are gabled dormers.	II
Birch Farm House; 52.42511°N 2.39315°W		Early 18th century	The farmhouse is in dark red brick with stone dressings, rusticated quoins, bands, and a hipped tile roof. There are two storeys and an attic, a front of seven bays, two bays on the sides, and a lower rear wing. Above the doorway is a bracketed hood, and the windows are sashes with stone surrounds and keyblocks.	II*
Gate piers, Birch Farm; 52.42515°N 2.39340°W		Early 18th century	The gate piers flank the entrance of the drive to the farmhouse. They are in rusticated ashlar stone, and are surmounted by pineapple finials.	II
Kinlet Hall; 52.42784°N 2.43035°W		1729	A country house in Georgian style designed by Francis Smith of Warwick. It is in red brick with stone dressings, hipped roofs, and a symmetrical front. The main block has three storeys and sides of seven bays, angle pilasters, a cornice above the middle floor, and a parapet. On each sides are office wings with two storeys and four bays, joined to the main block by screen walls, and outside these are gabled stable blocks. In the centre of the main block is a doorway with fluted Doric pilasters and a segmental pediment. The windows are sashes with moulded architraves and keystones.	I
Walled garden, Kinlet Hall; 52.42623°N 2.42880°W	—	Mid 18th century	The walls surround an approximately rectangular area to the southeast of the hall and to the west of St John's Church, and incorporate an earlier churchyard wall. The wall is in red brick and some limestone with sandstone copings. There is a spur to the southeast, buttresses on the north and east walls, and two entrances with wooden doors.	II
Meaton; 52.39736°N 2.42311°W		18th century	A stone farmhouse, the front rendered, with quoins and a hipped tile roof. There are three storeys and a symmetrical front of three bays. The central doorway has a moulded surround and a pediment, and the windows are casements with segmental heads.	II
Milestone at SO705794; 52.41289°N 2.43433°W	—	18th century	The milestone is on the north side of a minor road. It is in limestone and has an arched head. The milestone carries a rectangular cast iron plaque inscribed with the distance in miles to Bewdley.	II
Milestone at SO749782; 52.40157°N 2.37089°W	—	Mid to late 18th century	The milestone is on the north side of the B4194 road. It is in sandstone and has a curved head. The milestone carries a cast iron plaque inscribed with the distance in miles to Bewdley.	II
Milestone at SO720828; 52.44260°N 2.41364°W	—	Mid to late 18th century	The milestone is on the west side of the B4363 road. It is in sandstone and has a curved head. The milestone carries a cast iron plaque inscribed with the distances in miles to Bridgnorth and to Cleobury Mortimer.	II
Milestone at SO690779; 52.40893°N 2.44057°W	—	Mid to late 18th century	The milestone is on the west side of the B4363 road. It is in sandstone and has a curved head. The milestone carries a cast iron plaque inscribed with the distances in miles to Bridgnorth and to Cleobury Mortimer.	II
