= Kinlet Hall =

Grade I listed building in Shropshire, United Kingdom

Coordinates: 52.4278°N 2.4303°W

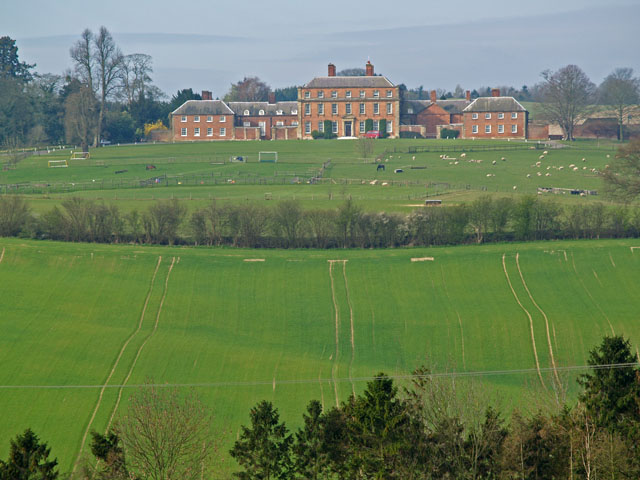
Kinlet Hall

Kinlet Hall is an 18th-century, 33,609 square feet (3,122 m^{2}) English country house at Kinlet, Shropshire, England, now occupied by an independent day and residential school. It is a Grade I listed building and its design was inspired by Villa Pisani, Montagnana.

The manor of Kinlet was held by the Brampton and Cornwall families until it passed via his maternal ancestors to Humphrey Blount (of the Sodington Hall family), who was High Sheriff of Shropshire in 1461. It later passed to Rowland Lakyn (or Lacon), High Sheriff in 1571, through the female line and subsequently by the marriage of a Lacon daughter and heiress who married Sir William Childe.

The old manor house was replaced in 1727–1729 by William Lacon Childe, who commissioned architect Francis Smith of Warwick to create the present Palladian style mansion. The brick-built, east-facing, three-storey, seven-bayed central block is flanked by single-storey wings and two smaller detached two-storey blocks; the block to the north originally housed stables and the block to the south the kitchens.

The Childe family were resident at Kinlet Hall until the 20th century. During World War II, the house was occupied by the United States Army and afterwards acquired by Moffats Independent School.

In June 2020, Kinlet Hall was placed for sale for £3.5 million.

A Great Western Railway Hall class locomotive No. 4936 is named Kinlet Hall.

== See also ==
- Grade I listed buildings in Shropshire
- Listed buildings in Kinlet
