= Edward Northey =

Edward Northey may refer to:

- Edward Northey (barrister) (1652–1723), British barrister, Attorney General for England and Wales
- Edward Northey (priest) (1755–1828), Canon of Windsor
- Edward Northey (British Army officer) (1868–1953), British general and Governor of Kenya
