= Kinlet =

Village in Shropshire, England

Coordinates: 52.416°N 2.416°W

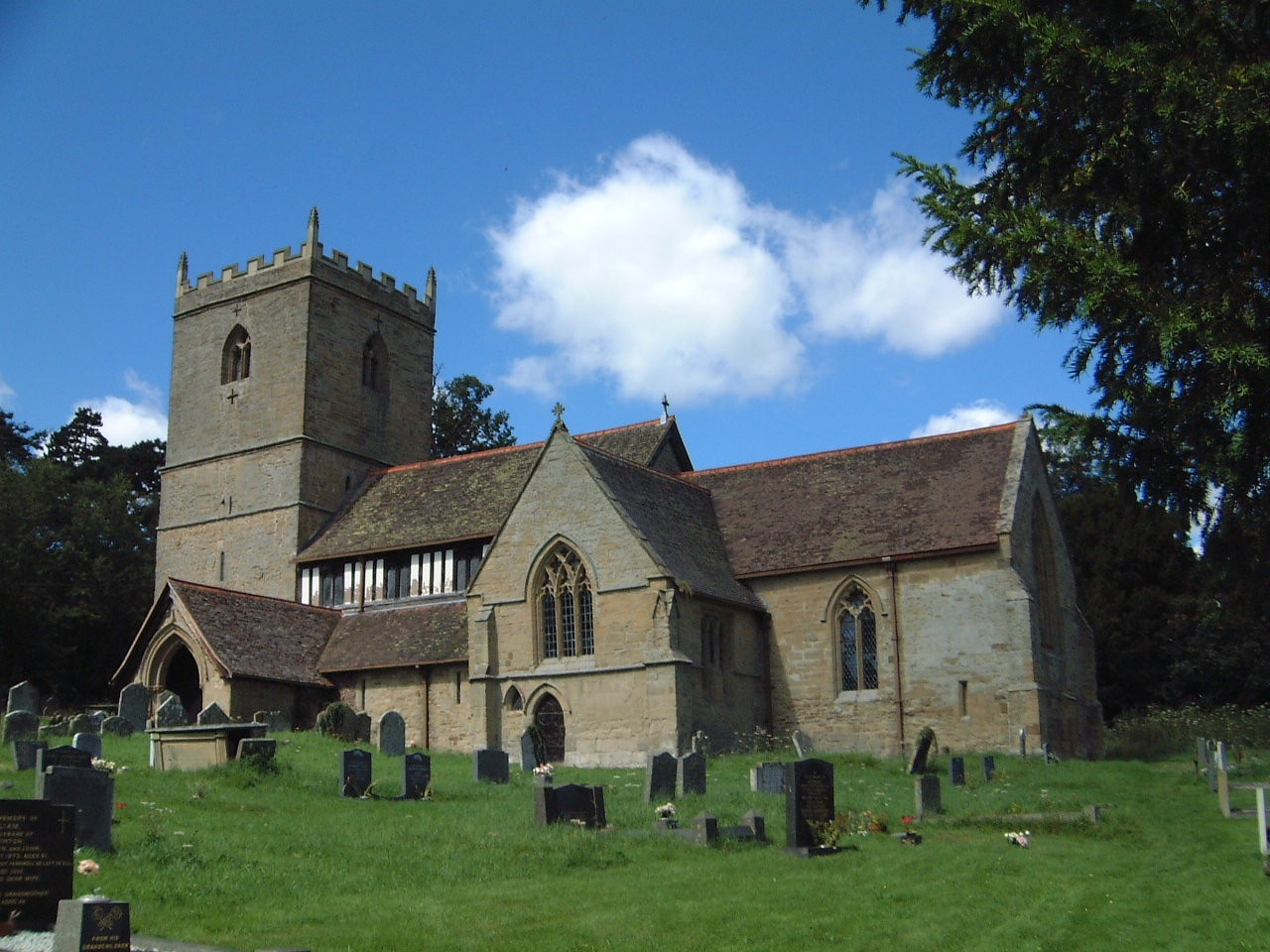
- St John's Church, Kinlet

- Location within Shropshire
- Population: 901 (2011 census).
- OS grid reference: SO716799
  - London: 117mi (187km)
- Civil parish: Kinlet
- Unitary authority: Shropshire
- Ceremonial county: Shropshire
- Region: West Midlands
- Country: England
- Sovereign state: United Kingdom
- Post town: Bewdley
- Postcode district: DY12
- Dialling code: 01299
- Police: West Mercia
- Fire: Shropshire
- Ambulance: West Midlands
- UK Parliament: Ludlow

Kinlet is a small village and civil parish in the south-east of the county of Shropshire, England. The parish is on the northern edge of the Wyre Forest and incorporates the hamlets of Kinlet Village, Button Bridge and Button Oak. Kinlet is located 18 miles (29 km) south of Telford, the main town in Shropshire and 23 miles (37 km) west of Birmingham.

The village is located in the centre of the parish. Its parish has a population of 680 according to the 2001 census, The land within the parish totals 8,164 acres (3,304 ha; 12.756 sq mi). increasing to 901 at the 2011 census. There is little in terms of employment in the parish, with residents travelling to nearby towns and cities.

== History ==
The name Kinlet, a combination of kin (royal) and lett (district), comes from the time of Queen Edith of Wessex, wife of Edward the Confessor, who held the knoll at Kinlet. The earliest known human activity was the scatter of flints near Catsley in the centre of the parish, south of Kinlet village. The parish as it is today, was once two smaller parishes, Kinlet in the north and Earnwood in the south.

Queen Edith had inherited Kinlet and Cleobury Mortimer from the late Edward the Confessor, at the time of the Domesday Book. Kinlet was then given to Ranulph de Mortimer, who subsequently passed it down to his son, Hugh de Mortimer. The Mortimers were passionate about hunting and used Earnwood as a private hunting ground. The Mortimers were succeeded by Bryan de Brampton in 1176. The De Bramptons gave significant gifts of land in Kinlet to Wigmore Abbey and other religious institutes. This was intended to encourage woodland clearance and increase production.

Kinlet was passed through the Cornwalls, to Sir John Cornwall on the death of his father, Sir Brian Cornwall in 1391. His only surviving daughter, Elizabeth, inherited Kinlet in 1414, before marrying Sir William Lichefeld. Sir William Lichefeld held Kinlet until his death in 1446, Kinlet was then passed down to Isabel, sister of Sir John Cornwall and second wife of Sir John Blount II. Sir John Blount II had a son with Isabel, also named John. John inherited Kinlet after his father's death. The estate was passed onto Humphery Blount (grandson of Sir John Blount and his marriage with Isabel) in 1453.

Sir George Blount inherited Kinlet in 1531, on the death of his father, John. In 1581, Sir George Blount gave Kinlet to Rowland Lacon, son of his eldest sister Agnes, married to Sir Richard Lacon, instead of his only surviving child, Dorothy. At his death, Rowland Lacon was succeeded by his son, Sir Francis Lacon, who married Jane, daughter of the Viscount of Montague in 1589.

The marriage of Ann Lacon to Sir William Childe in 1640, bought the Childe family to Shropshire. Their eldest son, Sir Lacon Childe, was left the lordship at Kinlet and Cleobury Mortimer, whilst their younger two sons, Thomas and William, were left the manor of Earnwood. After the death of Sir Lacon Childe, Kinlet was held by his nephew, William Lacon Childe. He rebuilt Kinlet Hall in 1729. The surrounding village is likely to have been cleared at this time, with the building of the village school in its current location, establishing this as the centre of the village. He also earned substantial revenue from the Kinlet estate. This included sales of produce, bark and rent payments. His daughter inherited Kinlet and married Charles Baldwyn. In 1919, much of the Kinlet estate was put up for sale.

== The village ==
The centre of the village is located at the meeting of the roads, B4363 and B4194. In the centre of the village there is a primary school. Kinlet C of E Primary school caters for children aged between 4 and 11 years old.

There is also an independent, residential school to the north-west of the village, Moffats School, which is for children aged between 4 and 13 years old and has been based in Kinlet Hall since the end of the Second World War. Older pupils travel to the Lacon Childe School in Cleobury Mortimer.

There are two public houses in the parish, The Eagle and Serpent in village of Kinlet and the Button Oak Inn in the village of Button Oak. There is also a village hall and a residential care home.

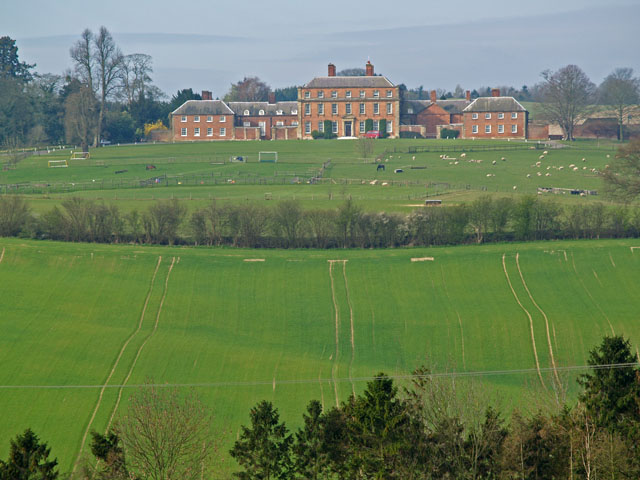
Kinlet Hall – Now The Moffatt School

== Churches ==
There are two churches in the parish.

St. John the Baptist church is the Anglican parish church located along the drive to Kinlet Hall. The church is a stone structure built by the Normans and is Grade I listed by English Heritage. Within the church there are standing monuments to Sir George Blount and his wife, Constantia, dated 1581. There are also tombs for Sir Humphrey Blount and his wife, Elizabeth and Sir John Blount and his wife, Catherine. The church was restored in 1892 by John Oldrid Scott who later designed the memorial to Major Charles Baldwyn Childe (killed in Boer War 1900).

St Andrew's Church in Button Oak is also an Anglican church. It was built in the 19th century as a mission church for people working in the Wyre Forest.

== Demography ==
The population of Kinlet was 602 at the time of the first census in 1801. The population fell slowly over the next seventy years, reaching a low of 431 at the 1871 census. After this, the population of Kinlet rose sharply, reaching 558 in the 1891 census. The early 20th Century saw the population stabilise until World War II. There was no census in 1941 because of World War II. The population increased from 494 in the 1951 census to 549 in the 1971 census. There is very little employment in the area, with people travelling to nearby towns such as Cleobury Mortimer and Highley. The last shop and post office in the village closed in the 1980s. The census which was carried out in 2001 showed Kinlet to have a population of 680. Population data between 1801 and 1961 is from Vision of Britain and Histpop.

Population of Kinlet
Year	1801	1811	1821	1831	1841	1851	1861	1871	1881	1891
Population	602	527	552	532	480	447	442	431	432	558
Year	1901	1911	1921	1931	1941	1951	1961	1971	1981	1991
Population	539	536	501	475	n/a	494	501	549	n/a	n/a
Year	2001									
Population	680									

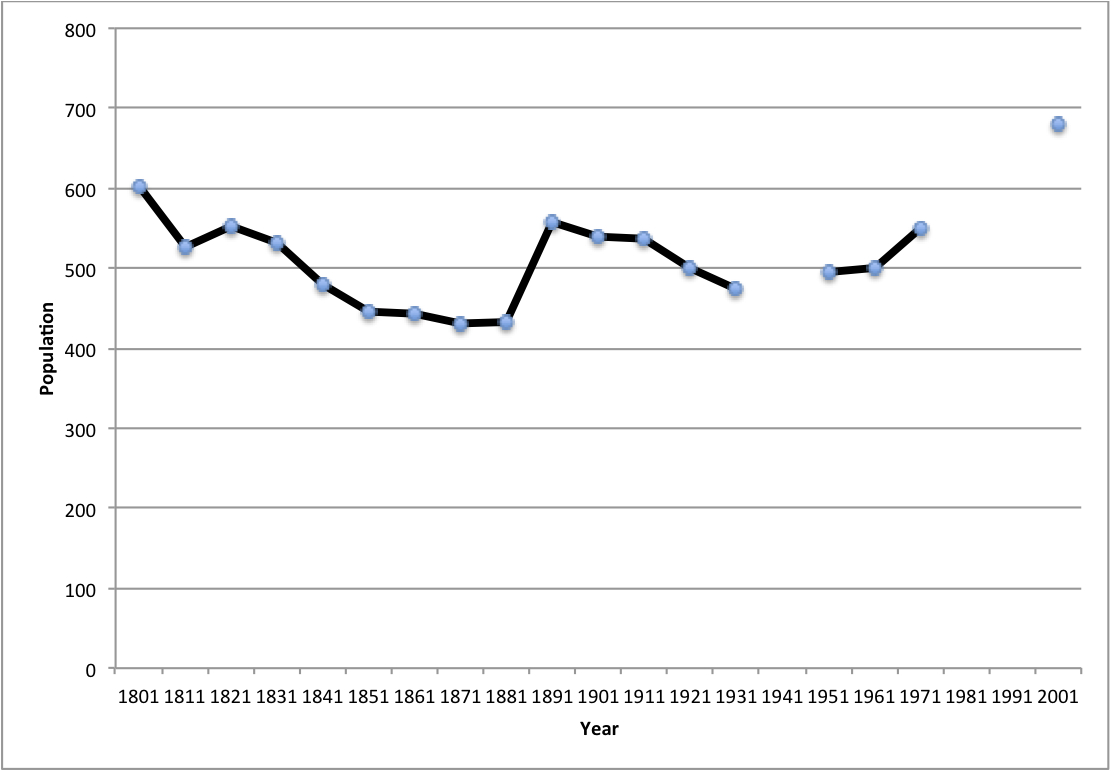
Kinlet Population Between 1801 and 2001

The Census of 1831 showed that the majority of people were employed in the agriculture sector, surveying males aged over 20. Agricultural labourers were the most common occupation with 90, followed by retail and handicrafts with 16. Little had changed by the census of 1881 with 102 males and one female employed in agriculture. Females were also surveyed, with 74 classified as having an unknown occupation.

== Transport ==
There is a bus service through the village, operated by Central Buses.

== Notable people ==
- Elizabeth Blount (c.1498-1540), mistress of Henry VIII, was daughter of Sir John Blount of Kinlet.
- John Rea (died 1681), horticulturalist, kept nursery garden at Kinlet at time of his death.
- John Brickdale Blakeway (1765–1826), topographer, was Vicar of Kinlet 1800–1816.
- William Bruere Otter (1805–1876), ultimately Archdeacon of Lewes, was Vicar of Kinlet 1837–1847.
- Professor Peter Bullock (1937 in Kinlet-2008), soil scientist and a member of the IPCC.

== See also ==
- Listed buildings in Kinlet
