= Castle Toot =

Ruined medieval motte castle in Shropshire, England

Coordinates: 52.38200°N 2.47008°W

Castle Toot, or Cleobury Castle, was a motte castle by the River Rea in the town of Cleobury Mortimer, Shropshire. It is a scheduled monument, first listed in 1951.

The castle was built in the early 12th century and owned by the Mortimer family. Hugh de Mortimer rebelled against Henry II and as a result the castle was destroyed in 1155.

The site consists of a motte situated on a natural promontory on the east side of the River Rea. It is surrounded by a dry moat on three sides, but the fourth is a steep drop into the river. The entrance is in the northeast corner of the motte. Fragments of the walls and the remains of a gatehouse were visible at the end of the 18th century. In 1911, stones forming the base of a causeway or bridge were observed. The current house that is situated on the property was built in the 1950s.

The earthworks remain largely intact. Towards the end of the 18th century, some stonework of the entrance and causeway to the castle was visible, but has now presumably been buried or dismantled. There have been no archaeological finds at the site, despite excavations for building works being made in recent years.
