= Listed buildings in Neen Sollars =

Neen Sollars is a civil parish in Shropshire, England. It contains 17 listed buildings that are recorded in the National Heritage List for England. Of these, one is at Grade II*, the middle of the three grades, and the others are at Grade II, the lowest grade. The parish contains the village of Neen Sollars and the surrounding countryside. Most of the listed buildings are in or near the village, and these consist of a church and memorials in the churchyard, and houses, cottages and farmhouses, many of which are timber framed. To the south of the parish are three more listed buildings, one a house, and the other two that were formerly associated with the Leominster Canal, an aqueduct and the original headquarters of the canal company.

== Key ==
Grade	Criteria
II*	Particularly important buildings of more than special interest
II	Buildings of national importance and special interest

== Buildings ==
Name and location	Photograph	Date	Notes	Grade
All Saints Church; 52.34748°N 2.50056°W		Early to mid 14th century	The church was restored in 1856–57 by William Butterfield who rebuilt the chancel. It is built in stone and has tiled roofs with ornamental ridges. The church has a cruciform plan consisting of a nave with a south porch, north and south transepts, a chancel, and a tower at the crossing. The tower has lancet windows, a pyramidal roof, and a shingled broach spire with lucarnes.	II*
Reaside Farmhouse; 52.35564°N 2.49304°W	—	16th century	The farmhouse is timber framed with brick and rendered infill and a tile roof. It is partly in one storey with an attic, and partly in two storeys, with a front of three bays, and later extensions. There is a porch wing with a chamfered bressumer, the windows are casements, and there are two gabled dormers on the front and three flat-roofed dormers at the rear.	II
Haughton; 52.34841°N 2.49892°W	—	Early 17th century	A farmhouse, later a private house, it was altered and extended in the 19th century. The original part is timber framed with brick infill, partly rendered, and the roof is tiled. The extensions have slate roofs and gables with bargeboards and finials. The house has an L-shaped plan, with a main range of two storeys and an attic and three bays, a single-bay cross-wing at the rear, and infilling in the angle. There is a gabled porch, the windows are casements, on the front is a bay window, and to the right is a conservatory.	II
High House Farmhouse; 52.34828°N 2.49758°W		Early 17th century	The farmhouse, which has an earlier wing and was altered later, is timber framed with rendered infill on a rendered plinth, and has a gabled tile roof, hipped to the right. There are two storeys, a three-bay main range, an earlier two-bay cross-wing on the right, and a rear 20th-century lean-to extension. The windows are casements.	II
Old Smithy Cottage; 52.34784°N 2.49900°W		Early 17th century	The house, at one time a toll house and a smithy, was extended in the 20th century. It is timber framed with rendered infill on a brick plinth, and with a tile roof. There is a single storey and an attic, a front of two bays, a single-storey extension on the left, and a single-story and a two-storey extension at the rear. The windows are casements, and there is a gabled dormer.	II
Church Cottage; 52.34758°N 2.49944°W		17th century	The house is partly timber framed with brick infill, and partly in brick painted to resemble timber framing, and the roof is tiled. There are two storeys, three bays, and a later single-storey brick extension. The windows are casements, and the doorways are in the gable ends.	II
Fern Cottage; 52.34853°N 2.49625°W	—	17th century	The house was altered and extended in the 20th century. The original part is timber framed with brick infill, partly rendered, on a stone plinth, the extension is rendered and painted to resemble timber framing, and the roof is tiled. The house has an L-shaped plan, consisting of a main range with two storeys and an attic, and two bays, and cross-wing extensions at the rear with one storey and attics. The windows are casements, and on the front is a bow window.	IIs
Hill Top Farmhouse; 52.34816°N 2.50396°W	—	17th century	The farmhouse was remodelled in the 18th century and a parallel rear wing was added in the 20th century. The main part of the house is in red brick and the roofs are tiled with two coped gables at the front. There are two storeys and an attic and four bays. The central doorway has a moulded surround with pilasters, a blocked semicircular fanlight, and an open pediment. The windows are casements with lintels and keyblocks, and the windows in the attic have round heads. On the right is a single-storey timber framed wing, and there is a later extension wing on the left.	IIs
Rea Bridge Cottage; 52.34796°N 2.49494°W	—	17th century	The house, which was extended in the 20th century, is timber framed with brick infill, partly rendered, on a stone plinth, the extension is rendered and painted to resemble timber framing, and the roof is tiled. It has one storey and an attic, a bay front, and later extensions. The windows are casements.	IIs
Dower House; 52.33171°N 2.49915°W	—	Late 17th to early 18th century	A brick house on a brick plinth with stone capping, storey bands, a dentil eaves cornice at the rear, and a tile roof with coped parapeted gables. There are two storeys and an attic, four bays, and a rear lean-to extension. There is a central lean-to porch with a round-headed entrance, and the windows are casements.	IIs
Mantle memorial 52.34749°N 2.50024°W	—	Early to mid 18th century	The memorial is in the churchyard of All Saints Church, and is to the memory of Joseph Mantle and bis wife. It is an ashlar headstone and has a double raised curved upper edge. There is a twin inscription with a raised foliate ornament.	II
Memorial south of the nave 52.34730°N 2.50056°W	—	18th century	The memorial is in the churchyard of All Saints Church, and is to the memory of members of the Pooler and Giles families. It is a pedestal tomb in stone, and has a moulded plinth. The lid has an octagonal ogee-shaped raised centre on plain slab with a cornice, and plain inscribed panels.	II
Wall memorial 52.34744°N 2.50035°W	—	Late 18th century	The memorial is in the churchyard of All Saints Church, and is to the memory of members of the Wall family. It is a pedestal tomb with a two-stage plinth, inscribed panels, and a shallow pyramidal lid with a cornice and a frieze.	II
Memorial south of the south transept 52.34738°N 2.50044°W	—	c. 1785	The memorial is in the churchyard of All Saints Church, and is to the memory of a member of the Marlton family. It is an ashlar slab tomb, and consists of an inscribed slab with moulded edges on a brick plinth.	II
Rea Aqueduct; 52.32972°N 2.51327°W		1793–94	The aqueduct was designed by Thomas Dadford Jr. to carry the Leominster Canal, now disused, over the River Rea, and later used for a footpath. It is in brick and consists of a single segmental arch with a span of 13.7 metres (45 ft) and a brick-lined trough for the canal. It has a stone keystone, a brick parapet, and brick abutments with stone quoins.	II
Wharf House; 52.33096°N 2.48778°W	—	c. 1799	A house, originally the headquarters of the Kington and Leominster Canal Company and later extended, in red brick with a dentil eaves course and a tile roof. There are two storeys and cellars, and a two-bay front, with a full height bow window and a semi-conical roof. The windows are sash window, and in the cellar are segmental arched openings that originally admitted boats. To the left is a 20th-century single-storey extension, also with a bow window, and a two-storey extension to the right.	II
Neen Sollars Bridge; 52.34826°N 2.49504°W		Early 19th century	The bridge carries a road over the River Rea. It is in brick, and has two arches each with a span of 5.5 metres (18 ft), and a central buttress. The string course, cutwater and abutments are in stone.	II
