= Button Oak =

Coordinates: 52.39907°N 2.36423°W

- Civil parish: Kinlet
- Unitary authority: Shropshire
- Ceremonial county: Shropshire
- Region: West Midlands
- Country: England
- Sovereign state: United Kingdom
- Post town: Bewdley
- Postcode district: DY12
- Dialling code: 01299
- Police: West Mercia
- Fire: Shropshire
- Ambulance: West Midlands
- UK Parliament: Ludlow

Button Oak is a small village in the English county of Shropshire, England. It is 3 miles north west of Bewdley.

Button Oak is very similar to nearby village Kinlet, in whose civil parish it lies, and Button Bridge which are also small residential areas. Nearby attractions include the Wyre Forest bike track and nature walk, where wildlife like deer, squirrels and birds can be seen and even a rocket fuel testing facility owned by Roxel buried deep in the woods.

== Amenities ==
The village has an Anglican church, dedicated to St Andrew, built in the 19th century as a mission church for people working in the Wyre Forest. There is also a pub a few yards away from the church, and a caravan site situated behind residents' houses.

== Transport ==
There is a bus service through the village, operated by Central Buses. The number 125 bus service operates Mondays to Saturdays, from Bridgnorth to Stourbridge.

Taxi companies from Kidderminster also cover the Button Oak area.
