= Simon Evans =

Simon Evans may refer to:

- Simon Evans (comedian) (born 1965), English comedian
- Simon Evans (writer) (1895–1950), English writer
- Simon Evans (racing driver) (born 1990), New Zealand racing driver
- Simon Evans (director) (born 1983), English theatre and television director, writer, and actor
