= Cleobury Mortimer railway station =

Former railway station in Shropshire, England

Cleobury Mortimer
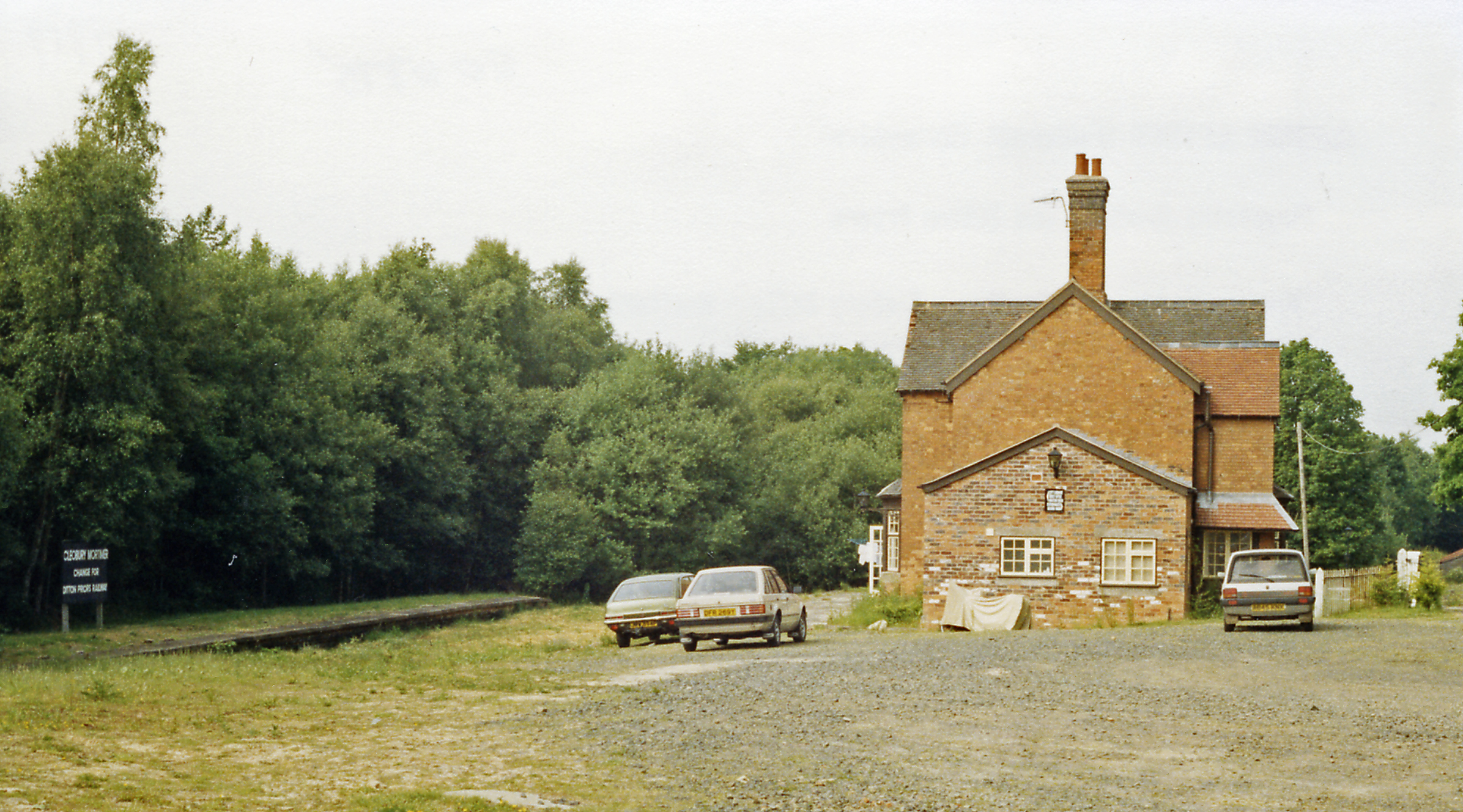

General information
- Location: Cleobury Mortimer, Shropshire; England
- Coordinates: 52.3758°N 2.4405°W
- Grid reference: SO702754
- Platforms: 2

Other information
- Status: Disused

History
- Original company: Tenbury and Bewdley Railway
- Pre-grouping: Great Western Railway
- Post-grouping: Great Western Railway

Key dates
- 13 August 1864: Opened
- 1 August 1962: Closed
Location

Cleobury Mortimer railway station was a station in Cleobury Mortimer, Shropshire, England. The station was opened in 1864 and closed in 1962. Station buildings are still standing although they have been split into housing. The platforms exist in the undergrowth with a steel yard build to the west.

| Preceding station | Disused railways | Following station |
|---|---|---|
| Cleobury Town Halt; Line and station closed | Great Western Railway; Cleobury Mortimer and Ditton Priors Light Railway | Terminus |
| Neen Sollars; Line and station closed | Great Western Railway; Tenbury and Bewdley Railway | Wyre Forest; Line and station closed |
