= Edward Northey (priest) =

Edward Northey's legacy as Canon of Windsor

Edward Northey (1755 – 18 February 1828) was a Canon of Windsor from 1797 to 1828.

== Career ==
He was educated at Corpus Christi College, Cambridge.

He was appointed:

- Vicar of Kinlet, Shropshire
- Vicar of Cleobury Mortimer, Shropshire
- Vicar of Urchfont, Wiltshire, 1800
- Vicar of Nether Stowey, Somerset 1801
- Vicar of Edlesborough, Buckinghamshire 1807–1841
- Rector of West Ilsley, Berkshire 1820–1826

He was appointed to the seventh stall in St George's Chapel, Windsor Castle in 1797, and held the stall until 1828. He was buried in the chapel on 27 February 1828.
