= Jack Price (athlete) =

British long-distance runner

Personal information
- Nationality: British (English)
- Born: 10 May 1884 Neen Savage, Shropshire, England
- Died: 2 December 1965 (aged 81) Stourbridge, Worcestershire, England

Sport
- Sport: Athletics
- Event: Long-distance
- Club: Small Heath Harriers

Jack Price (10 May 1884 – 2 December 1965) was a British long-distance runner who competed at the 1908 Summer Olympics.

== Biography ==
Price began his athletics career in racewalking and won the 1904 Halesowen to Kidderminster race. He began to race cross country and was selected by the England team for the 1906 International Cross Country Championship.

After winning the Midland Olympic Marathon Trial, Price represented Great Britain at the 1908 Summer Olympics in London, where he competed in the men's marathon event but failed to finish. He did however lead the race until pulling out at the 14 miles point due to the heat.

Price turned professional and on his debut in 1910 won the prestigious Powderhall Marathon and also set world record for 15 miles.

His career effectively ended due to World War I, during which he fought in France with the Royal Garrison Artillery. In 1922, he helped to form the Halesowen Athletic Club, and later coached Eddie Webster.
