= Cleobury Town Halt railway station =

Former railway station in England

Cleobury Town Halt

General information
- Location: Cleobury Mortimer, Shropshire; England
- Coordinates: 52.3898°N 2.4714°W
- Grid reference: SO680769

Other information
- Status: Disused

History
- Original company: Cleobury Mortimer and Ditton Priors Light Railway
- Pre-grouping: Cleobury Mortimer and Ditton Priors Light Railway
- Post-grouping: Great Western Railway

Key dates
- 21 November 1908: Opened
- 26 September 1938: Closed
Location

Cleobury Town Halt railway station was a station in Cleobury Mortimer, Shropshire, England. The station was opened in 1908 and closed in 1938.

Preceding station	Disused railways	Following station
Chilton Siding; Line and station closed	Great Western Railway; Cleobury Mortimer and Ditton Priors Light Railway	Cleobury Mortimer; Line and station closed
