= Listed buildings in Neen Savage =

Neen Savage is a civil parish in Shropshire, England. It contains 17 listed buildings that are recorded in the National Heritage List for England. Of these, two are at Grade II*, the middle of the three grades, and the others are at Grade II, the lowest grade. The parish contains the village of Neen Savage and the surrounding countryside. The oldest listed building is the church, which originated in the 12th century. Most of the other listed buildings are houses, cottages, farm houses and farm buildings, the earliest of which are timber framed. The other listed buildings are a vicarage and a war memorial.

== Key ==
Grade	Criteria
II*	Particularly important buildings of more than special interest
II	Buildings of national importance and special interest

== Buildings ==
Name and location	Photograph	Date	Notes	Grade
St Mary's Church; 52.39307°N 2.48003°W		12th century	The top of the tower was replaced following a fire in 1825, and the church was restored in 1881–84. The church is built in stone, and consists of a nave and chancel in one cell, a south porch, and a west tower. The tower has tall pointed windows and an embattled parapet, some norman windows have survived in the body of the church, and the east window has three lights. The porch is timber framed, and the round-headed priest's door has a decorated hood mould.	II*
Musbatch Farmhouse; 52.39032°N 2.48358°W	—	16th century (probable	The farmhouse was extended in the 17th and 19th centuries. It is timber framed on a stone plinth with brick infill, the right return side is in limestone, part of the rear wall and the extension are in brick, and the roof is tiled. There is one storey and an attic, the original part has three bays, and the one-bay extension is slightly recessed on the left. The windows are casements, and there are three gabled dormers. At the rear a former cowshed has been incorporated into the house.	II
Detton Hall; 52.41319°N 2.49068°W	—	c. 1600	A farmhouse, mainly timber framed, with some stone, red brick dressings, and a tile roof. There are two storeys and an attic, and an H-shaped plan, consisting of a hall range and two cross-wings, giving a front of four bays; there is also a dairy with a granary above, and a lean-to Some of the timber framing is clad with corrugated iron and shingles. Some of the windows are casements and others are cross-windows.	II*
Burrow Cottage; 52.41037°N 2.46127°W	—	Late 16th to early 17th century	The cottage was later extended. The original part is timber framed and faced in stone, the extension is in stone, and the roof is thatched. There is a single storey and an attic, and four bays. In the centre is a porch with a thatched roof, most of the windows are casements, and there are two eyebrow dormers.	II
Reaside Farmhouse; 52.40520°N 2.48385°W	—	Late 16th to early 17th century	The original part of the farmhouse is timber framed with plaster infill, it was extended in about 1800 in limestone with dentilled eaves and a rendered front, and in the 19th century a brick extension was added to the east. The farmhouse has tiled roofs, and an irregular L-shaped plan. The south range has two storeys and two bays, and the east range has one storey and an attic and two bays. The windows are casements and there are two full dormers.	II
Stepple Hall; 52.39878°N 2.50088°W	—	Early 17th century	The house was extended in the late 18th century. The original part is timber framed with brick infill, the later part is in brick, and the roof is tiled. The earlier part has two storeys and casement windows, and the later part has three storeys, four bays, and sash windows, those in the lower two floors with keyblocks. On the front is a porch and a doorway with a fanlight and a pediment. On the right is a low wing with a canted bay window.	II
Cart shed, Stepple Hall; 52.39925°N 2.50128°W	—	1646	The cart shed is in stone with a tile roof. It is open on the east side, and has tall plain stone pillars.	II
Detton Mill House; 52.41042°N 2.49625°W	—	17th century	The miller's house was altered and extended in the 19th and 20th centuries. It is timber framed with rendered infill, the extension and a gable wall are in brick, and the roof is tiled. There are two storeys and an attic, and the house consists of a single-bay hall with a later two-bay cross-wing, and an extension to the east. The upper floor of the gable of the cross-wing is jettied with a moulded bressumer on carved brackets, and below it is a timber canted oriel window with a richly moulded sill. The other windows are casements.	II
Lower Elcott; 52.40072°N 2.47279°W	—	17th century	The farmhouse is partly timber framed, partly in stone and partly in brick, and has a tile roof. There are two storeys, three bays, and the windows are casements.	II
Lower Neen Farm House; 52.39204°N 2.47886°W	—	17th century	The farmhouse is partly timber framed, partly in stone and partly in brick, and has a tile roof. There are two storeys and an attic, and the windows are casements.	II
Nethercott; 52.40470°N 2.47656°W	—	17th century	A timber framed house, partly encased or rebuilt in stone and brick and exposed at the rear, and with a tile roof. There are two storeys and an attic and an irregular plan. Some windows are casements, others are sashes, and there is a barn attached on the right.	II
Nethercott Cottage; 52.40449°N 2.47709°W	—	17th century	The cottage was later altered. Originally timber framed, it has been partly encased or rebuilt in brick and stone, with some exposed timber framing at the rear and in the right gable end. The roof is tiled, there are two storeys, and the windows are casements.	II
Overwood Farm House; 52.41416°N 2.46851°W	—	17th century	The farmhouse is partly timber framed, partly in brick, and partly rendered, and has a tile roof. There are two storeys and an attic, and a front of five bays, with projecting wings. The windows are casements, and there are two gabled dormers.	II
Stone House; 52.39189°N 2.49552°W	—	17th century	The house is in stone with a tile roof. There are two storeys and attics, a front of four bays, the outer bays gabled and projecting, and a right wing. The windows are casements, and there are two flat-roofed dormers.	II
Wall Town Farm House; 52.40215°N 2.45288°W	—	18th century (probable)	The farmhouse is rendered and has a tile roof. There are two storeys and an attic, and three bays. On the front is a small gabled porch, and the windows are casements with segmental heads.	II
The Vicarage; 52.39348°N 2.47875°W	—	Early 19th century	The vicarage is in rendered brick, with an eaves cornice and a tile roof. There are two storeys, an irregular plan, and a front of five bays. On the front is a porch with Doric pilasters, above the door is a fanlight, and the windows are sashes.	II
War memorial 52.39300°N 2.47955°W		c. 1920	The memorial is in the churchyard of St Mary's Church. It is in stone, and consists of a plain Latin cross on stepped plinth and a square base. On the base are inscriptions and the names of those lost in the two World Wars.	II
