= Roland Lacon =

16th-century English politician

Roland Lacon (ca. 1537 – 3 November 1608), of Willey and Kinlet, Shropshire, was an English politician during the reign of Elizabeth I.

Lacon was a Member of Parliament for Much Wenlock in 1559.
