= Wyre Forest railway station =

Former railway station in Worcestershire, England

Wyre Forest

General information
- Location: North of Far Forest, Worcestershire; England
- Coordinates: 52.3813°N 2.4035°W
- Grid reference: SO726759
- Platforms: 1

Other information
- Status: Disused

History
- Original company: Tenbury and Bewdley Railway
- Pre-grouping: Great Western Railway
- Post-grouping: Great Western Railway

Key dates
- 1869: Opened
- 1962: Closed
Location

Wyre Forest railway station was a station to the north of Far Forest, Worcestershire, England. The station which served the Wyre Forest was opened in 1869 and closed in 1962.

Although the station was situated on the Tenbury and Bewdley Railway which opened on 1 August 1864, the construction of Wyre Forest Station required the consent of the Office of Woods and Forests. As a result the station did not open until 1 June 1869. The station closed to passenger traffic along with the rest of the Wyre Forest Line on 1 August 1962.

Preceding station	Disused railways	Following station
Cleobury Mortimer; Line and station closed	Great Western Railway; Tenbury and Bewdley Railway	Bewdley; Line closed, station open
