= Richard Jones (cricketer, born 1916) =

English cricketer

Personal information
- Full name: Richard Henry Jones
- Born: 3 November 1916; Redditch, Worcestershire, England
- Died: 14 July 2004 (aged 87); Cleobury Mortimer, Shropshire, England
- Batting: Left-handed
- Bowling: Right-arm medium

Domestic team information
- Years: Team
- 1946: Warwickshire

Career statistics
Competition	First-class
Matches	1
Runs scored	32
Batting average	16.00
100s/50s	–/–
Top score	23
Balls bowled	66
Wickets	–
Bowling average	–
5 wickets in innings	–
10 wickets in match	–
Best bowling	–
Catches/stumpings	1/–
- Source: Cricinfo, 23 December 2011

Richard Henry Jones (3 November 1916 – 14 July 2004) was an English cricketer. Jones was a left-handed batsman who bowled right-arm medium pace. He was born at Redditch, Worcestershire. He was known later in life as Richard Henry Cartwright-Jones.

Jones made a single first-class appearance for Warwickshire against Somerset at Edgbaston in the 1946 County Championship. Opening the bowling in Somerset's first-innings, he bowled eight wicketless overs, though conceded just 12 runs from them. He opened the batting in Warwickshire's first-innings and was dismissed for 9 runs by Johnny Lawrence, while in Somerset's second-innings he again opened the bowling, bowling three wicketless overs which cost 15 runs. He scored 23 runs in Warwickshire's second-innings, before he was dismissed by Arthur Wellard, with Warwickshire winning by 2 wickets.

He died at Cleobury Mortimer, Shropshire on 14 July 2004.
