= Neen Sollars =

Village in Shropshire, England

Coordinates: 52.347°N 2.498°W

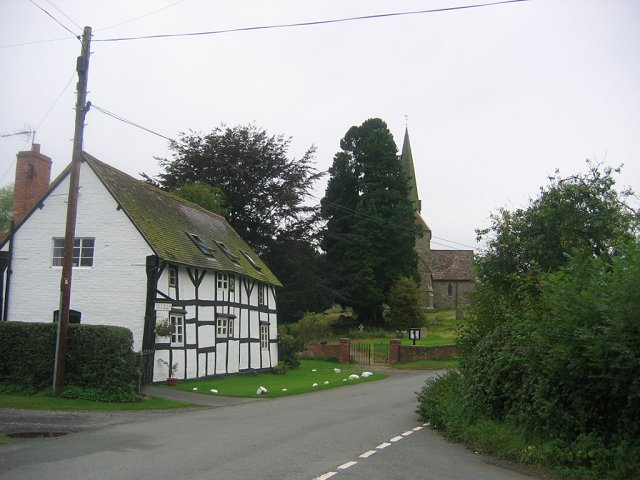
- Neen Sollars

- Location within Shropshire
- Population: 252 (2011)
- OS grid reference: SO660722
- Civil parish: Neen Sollars
- Unitary authority: Shropshire
- Ceremonial county: Shropshire
- Region: West Midlands
- Country: England
- Sovereign state: United Kingdom
- Post town: Kidderminster
- Postcode district: DY14
- Dialling code: 01299
- Police: West Mercia
- Fire: Shropshire
- Ambulance: West Midlands
- UK Parliament: Ludlow

Neen Sollars is a village and civil parish in south east Shropshire, England.

It is situated close to the border with Worcestershire, three miles south of the small market town of Cleobury Mortimer. Other large local centres of population include Ludlow, situated 12 miles to the west, which has an estimated population of 10,500 and Kidderminster, located 12.5 miles to the north east in the county of Worcestershire, which has a population of over 55,000.

The River Rea, which was historically known as the River Neen, flows by the village. The area surrounding Neen Sollars is pretty hilly, with maps showing several hills such as Neens Hill to the south and Birch Hill to the north. It is estimated that Neen Sollars lies between approximately 70 and 100 metres above sea level.

The village of Neen Sollars was formerly known as Neen Baldwin until about the year 1200. The new name came about from the merging of two family names, Baldwin le Poer and De Solers, when Elena and Eustacia Baldwin were married to members of the Sollars family.

== Amenities ==
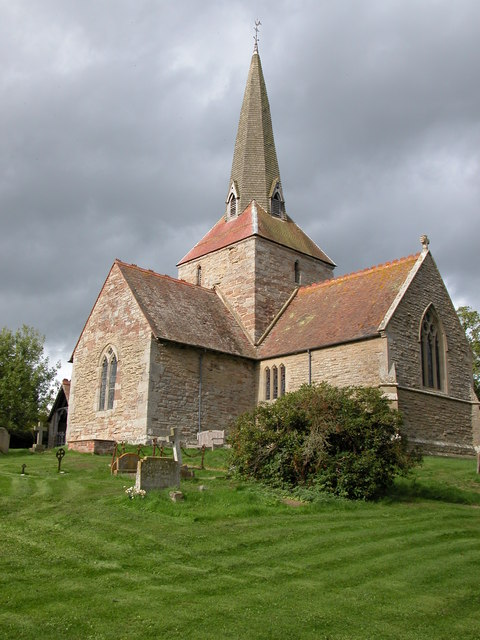
A photograph of All Saints church

There is a popular public house, the Live and Let Live, which serves food and real ale, it is from the 13th century. There is a Church of England church located within the village called All Saints. There is also a phone box in the village.

There was once a school situated within the village that served the children of Neen Sollars and the neighbouring village Milson. Entering the 20th century the villages were thriving agriculturally and the school had in excess of 60 children. However, when the advancements in farming techniques and technologies displaced many residents, the local populations diminished and the school closed in 1951. The closest primary school serving the village is three miles north in the small town of Cleobury Mortimer.

Neen Sollars railway station closed in 1962 and the railway has been lifted. The nearest centre for bus and train services is situated in the town of Ludlow.

== History & Families ==
Neen Sollars has roots dating from the time of the Saxons. Perhaps the earliest recorded mention of Neen Sollars in English literature is in The Domesday Book in 1086. The first recorded owner of large estates in Shropshire, in particular the manor of All Saints located amongst the villages of Neen Sollars and neighbouring Milson, was Siward the Saxon. According to the Domesday Book he appears to have held it from Osbern fitzRichard in the time of 1086. It was Osbern's grandson Osbern fitzHugh who gave Neen to the Baldwin family. When two of the three Baldwin daughters married members of the De Solars family the village was then formally known as Neen Sollars. The De Solars family also owned land in Herefordshire including Sutton Frene near Hereford. In 1327 nineteen inhabitants were assessed for the King's Subsidy, which noted that "nearly all of whom were distinctly well-to-do". One of the men assessed to be the most wealthy, was John Corbet who held Merebrook and Tetneshull (now known as Tetshill).

== Agriculture ==
The village is very much based around agriculture and has been for many centuries. This can be proven by looking at a quote transcribed from The National Gazetteer of Great Britain and Ireland, dating from 1868, that states Neen Sollars as being "wholly agricultural". The geology of the area is also described as being chiefly clay with a gravel subsoil. The farming industry has been a main sector of employment for the residents with the 1801 census showing that over 50% of the village's occupants were employed in agricultural activities. There are still several farms located within the parish of Neen Sollars.

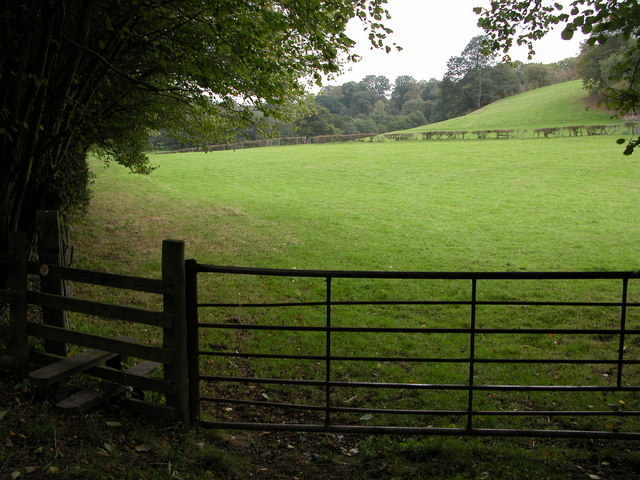
A photograph showing farmland situated in the parish of Neen Sollars

== Population Change ==
The population of the village has never been particularly high but it has fluctuated over the centuries. This is not an uncommon occurrence amongst small villages of this type. Dating from the 1801 census the population was recorded at 197. By the time the 1841 census came around the population had increased to 250. In John Marius Wilson's Imperial Gazetteer of England and Wales, published between 1870 and 1872, the population was counted as 189. The overall trend has recently been a slow and steady decline in the number of residents living in the village. The most likely explanation for the decrease in population is the advances in farm technologies. Many jobs were lost when machinery was introduced more widely causing some people to leave in search of work.

== See also ==
- Listed buildings in Neen Sollars
