= Simon Evans (writer) =

Welsh writer (1895–1940)

- Born: 10 August 1895; Hirnant, Montgomeryshire, Wales
- Died: 9 August 1940 (aged 44); Birmingham, England
- Education: Ruskin College
- Occupations: Writer, radio broadcaster, postman
- Spouse: Doris Aldridge (1938–1940; his death)
- Writing career
- Notable works: Round About the Crooked Steeple, Applegarth

Simon Evans (10 August 1895 – 9 August 1940), a postman with the GPO (now Royal Mail) for much of his short life, also developed a reputation in the 1930s as a writer and broadcaster on country life, particularly in and around rural South Shropshire. He had five books published by Heath Cranton Ltd within a seven-year span (1931–38) before his death in 1940. In recent years a selection of extracts from four of his books has been published, and other memorials created, including plaques in Cleobury Mortimer, where he lived for 14 years, and a 28-km walk based on his postal round stretching from Cleobury Mortimer deep into the South Shropshire countryside.

== Early life ==
Simon Evans was born at Tyn-y-Fedw, a farm between the villages of Pen-y-Bont-Fawr and Hirnant in Montgomeryshire, Wales, not far from Lake Vyrnwy, a reservoir supplying water to Liverpool. His father, Ellis Evans, was a farmer, but the family farm was too poor to support a growing number of sons, so Ellis and his family left Wales for Birkenhead on Merseyside around 1907. Simon, tall for his age, and speaking with a strong Welsh accent, did not have an easy time at school, but did owe his love of literature to an influential teacher. When he left school, he worked for the General Post Office as a messenger boy and postman.

== War service ==
On the outbreak of the First World War, Evans joined the 16th Battalion of the Cheshire Regiment, and was ultimately promoted Sergeant by age 20. He spent much of the next five years in trench warfare, an experience which left him mentally and physically scarred. He was wounded and invalided back to England at least once, and finally wounded in both legs and gassed in the summer of 1918. Although he regained use of his legs, resisting advice to have them amputated, his chest was left permanently damaged.

== Life after WWI ==
Evans returned to Merseyside after an operation on his wounded legs, but found himself unable to settle down to the life of an urban postman. Gas damage to his lungs meant he still had to spend time in convalescent homes, and on one occasion was advised to take a walking holiday before returning to his work as a postman. This holiday he took in or near Cleobury Mortimer, and there he found a postman willing to exchange a rural postal round for Simon's urban one. With some difficulty, an exchange was arranged, and Evans took up work in Cleobury Mortimer in 1926.

== Cleobury Mortimer ==
His new life in Cleobury Mortimer suited him perfectly. He later claimed that as a country postman he knew many more people than he had known when working in a town. At the time, the GPO provided rural walking postmen with shelter huts at the further point of their rounds, and Evans took full advantage of his, turning it into a place where he could read, write, and even spend the nights when off duty. In 1928, he won a scholarship offered by the Union of Post Office Workers to enroll on a correspondence course in English at Ruskin College, Oxford. This was to prove a turning point in his career, as it opened the door to literature, and led to his becoming a published writer and a broadcaster.

Evans' settling in Cleobury created a new focus for his family, and he was later joined by his mother and several siblings, probably after the death of his father. However, no descendants of this family now reside in the town.

== Literary work ==
Starting as a writer of short articles, largely about rural life as experienced by a country postman, Evans soon caught the attention of the BBC and became a regular contributor to programmes on the Midland Service. His broadcasts were heard by Shannie, the daughter of the publisher Heath Cranton who suggested to her father that Evans' work would be worth publishing in book form. A meeting between Cranton, Evans, and Rev. Rope (one of Cranton's existing authors) was arranged, and this resulted in the publication of Evans' first book on 20 March 1931. This was a collection of short items, most of which had already appeared in print or on the air. It was followed by his second book the following year, and three more in the next few years. His first book, Round About the Crooked Steeple, was the most successful, and the only one to be reprinted, the first reprint being dated 9 April 1931, only 20 days after the first impression. Throughout the 1930s, not only did Evans continue to work as a postman, but he also continued to write for periodicals, mostly local, but also occasionally for national weekly magazines and even daily newspapers. He often re-wrote or re-worked earlier pieces, and re-submitted these for publication elsewhere. A particular idea or anecdote, therefore, might appear in several publications, might also be broadcast on the BBC, and finally end up in one of his books. Four of his books were largely collections of articles which had already been published and broadcast pieces, but one, Applegarth (published 1936), was a full-length novel, and one which was so constructed as to admit of a sequel, should the opportunity arise.

Although sometimes referred to as a poet, Evans wrote little poetry, though frequently quoted poems by others in his books. His biographer, Mark Baldwin, has argued that Evans was more of a craftsman than an imaginative writer.

== Marriage and death ==
His frequent visits to the BBC studio in Birmingham brought Evans into contact, through a letter she had written him in 1937 asking if he was a genuine postman, with a professional singer and entertainer, Doris Aldridge; she was working at the time in children's radio as "Aunty Doris". They were married in 1938, and lived in a house in Cleobury Mortimer, built to their own design.

Less than two years later, Evans, who had given up his postal work in 1939, was badly affected by his recurring lung trouble, resulting most likely from the mustard gassing he suffered in the First World War, and died in Selly Oak Hospital in Birmingham on 9 August 1940, the day before what would have been his 45th birthday. He was cremated at nearby Lodge Hill Cemetery and his ashes scattered on Abdon Burf on Brown Clee Hill. There were no children of the marriage, and his widow soon left Cleobury Mortimer to pursue her professional career. She never remarried, and died in 2006.
