= Lacon Childe School =

Location
- Love Lane; Cleobury Mortimer; Shropshire, DY14 8PE; England; 52.3801°N 2.4847°W

Information
- Type: Academy
- Motto: More Than Just A School
- Established: 1735
- Local authority: Shropshire Council
- Department for Education URN: 141451 Tables
- Ofsted: Reports
- Headteacher: Nicola Stanfield
- Gender: Mixed
- Age: 11 to 16
- Enrolment: 556
- Capacity: 540
- Houses: Clee, Mortimer, Stretton, Wrekin
- Colour
- Website: www.lacon-childe.org.uk

Lacon Childe School is a mixed secondary school for 11 to 16 year olds, located in Cleobury Mortimer in the English county of Shropshire.

Previously a community school administered by Shropshire Council, Lacon Childe School converted to academy status in October 2014. The school continues to coordinate with Shropshire Council for admissions.

Lacon Childe School offers GCSEs, Cambridge Nationals, NVQs and ASDAN awards as programmes of study for pupils.

== Legacy building ==
The school was founded by former Shropshire Member of Parliament William Lacon Childe in 1740, and the remains of the old school building on Church Street are now a listed building. It is dated 1740 but there are multiple late nineteenth century and later extensions, and additions. It is of stone rubble construction with an ashlar facade and cornice. The hipped plain-tiled roof carries plain brick ridge stacks. It has a simple rectangular plan with late century set-back flanking wings and extensive 20th century ranges to rear. The central doorcase with rosette architrave, is surmounted by fascia and broken pediment with apex crest. An octagonal open wood bell turret has a cupola roof with ball finial and weather-vane.

To left side is single-storey stone gabled flanking wing of around 1890, known as the Baldwyn-Childe Dining Hall. Its doorcase fascia inscription reads: "Sir Lacon William Childe of Kinlet, Knight, by his will endowed this school, the building was erected in 1740".

The school was re-founded 1835 as a free school for 20 boarders with house for headmaster. It became a private school in 1890, and was sold to Local Education Authority in 1935.

== Description ==
The current school is a converter academy in the Shropshire Gateway Academies Trust catering for students from 11 years to 16 years old. There is capacity for 540 children but there are 556 on the roll. Ofsted visited the school in 2024 and found that is "Requires Improvement".

The school is sited on Love Lane, bordering on open country away from the legacy building. In 2001 the school became a specialist sports college and a joint use sports centre, Cleobury Mortimer Sports Centre, was built on its grounds. The centre's facilities include a fitness suite, a sports hall, a floodlit astroturf and courts.

== Academics ==
In order to fulfill the requirements of the National Curriculum students in years 7 to 9 study the core subjects of Maths, English and Science as well as a foreign language. Students have lessons in Music, Art and Drama as well as learning skills in research, technology and computing to support their work across all subjects. Students also learn life skills such as cooking and sewing.

In Key Stage 4, the programme of study consists of core subjects, exam subjects and non exam subjects and a series of options. Students are advised to choose EBacc subjects. Every student follows examination courses in English (Language and Literature), mathematics and science (double award), PE and PSRE, with the option of Computer Science, Geography, History or Triple Award Science. They then choose three GCSE or BTEC subjects from a list of 16.

== Headteachers ==
- 1999–2004: Gill Eatough
- 2004–2013: Allan Gilhooley
- 2013–2022: Darren Reynolds
- 2022–2024: Noah Turner
- 2024–2026: Stuart Weston
- 2026-present: Nicola Stanfield (acting)
