= Neen Savage =

Hamlet in Shropshire, England

Coordinates: 52.394°N 2.479°W

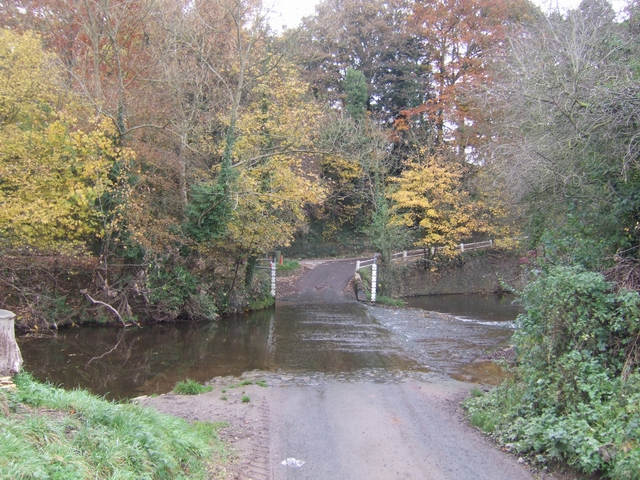
- Ford at Neen Savage

- Location within Shropshire
- OS grid reference: SO674774
- Civil parish: Neen Savage
- Unitary authority: Shropshire
- Ceremonial county: Shropshire
- Region: West Midlands
- Country: England
- Sovereign state: United Kingdom
- Post town: KIDDERMINSTER
- Postcode district: DY14
- Dialling code: 01299
- Police: West Mercia
- Fire: Shropshire
- Ambulance: West Midlands
- UK Parliament: Ludlow

Neen Savage is a civil parish and a village in south east Shropshire, England. It is situated north of the small market town of Cleobury Mortimer. The River Rea, which was historically known as the River Neen, flows past the hamlet, and a notable ford exists.

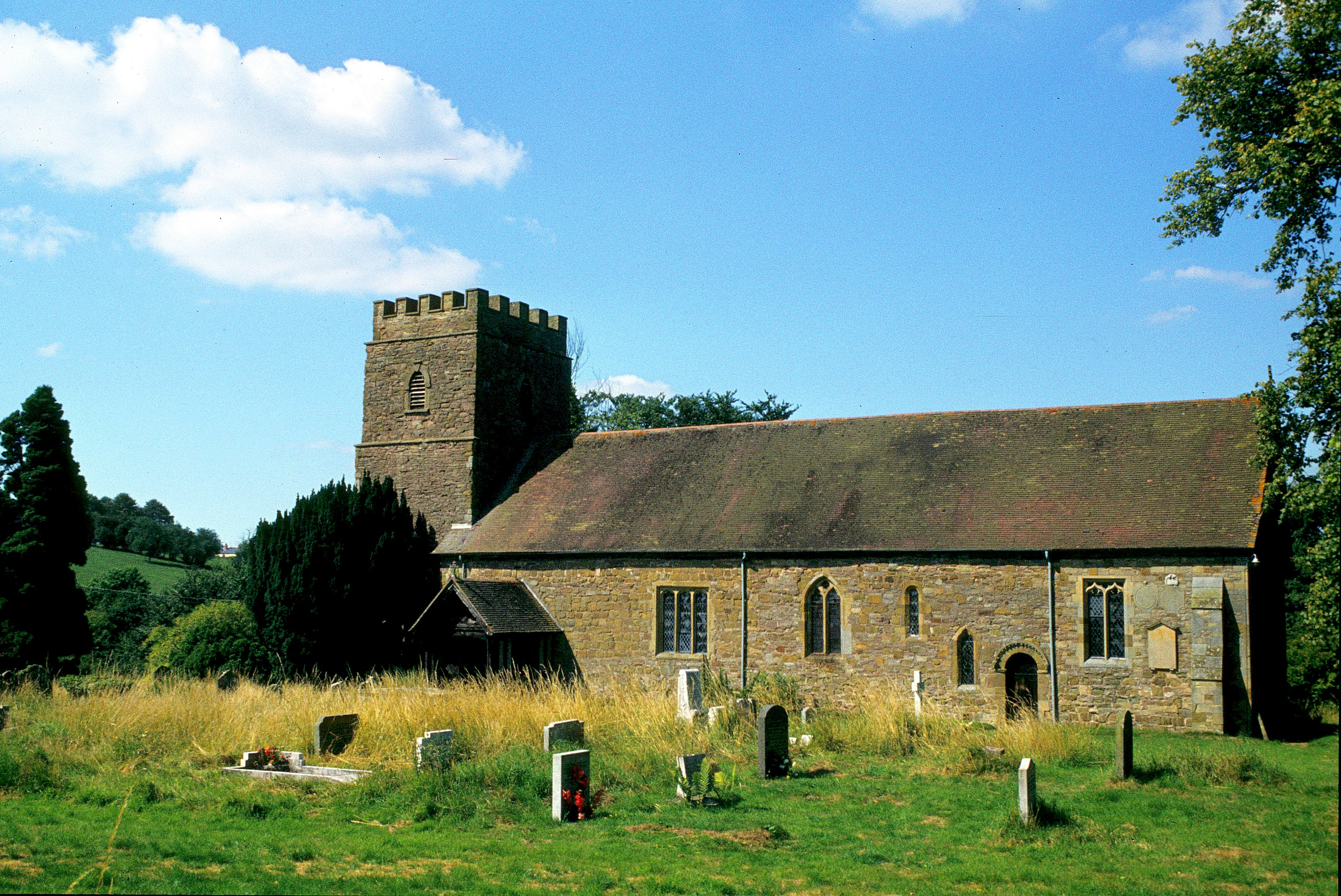
The parish church is a Grade II* listed building.

The village contains a parish church, in whose churchyard stands the local war memorial in form of a square stone cross.

Two early London publishers were born here. Thomas Adams (c1566-1620) was son of a yeoman farmer of Neen Savage, and George Potter (c.1572-1627) was a son of Edward Potter of Musbatch. Musbatch Cottage still stands. Both Thomas and George became members of the Stationers Company and had businesses near St Paul's Cathedral. Also born there was athlete Jack Price (1884–1965), who took part in the 1908 Summer Olympics.

In 2016 the population of Neen Savage was estimated to be just under 300.

== See also ==
- Listed buildings in Neen Savage
