= Gilbert Scott =

Gilbert Scott commonly refers to Sir George Gilbert Scott (1811–1878), a British architect principally known for his church buildings.

Gilbert Scott may also refer to several other British architects:

- George Gilbert Scott, Jr. (1839–1897), son of George Gilbert Scott
- Giles Gilbert Scott (1880–1960), son of George Gilbert Scott, Jr.
- Richard Gilbert Scott (1923–2017), son of Giles Gilbert Scott
- Adrian Gilbert Scott (1882–1963), son of George Gilbert Scott, Jr.
