= Central Buses =

English bus company

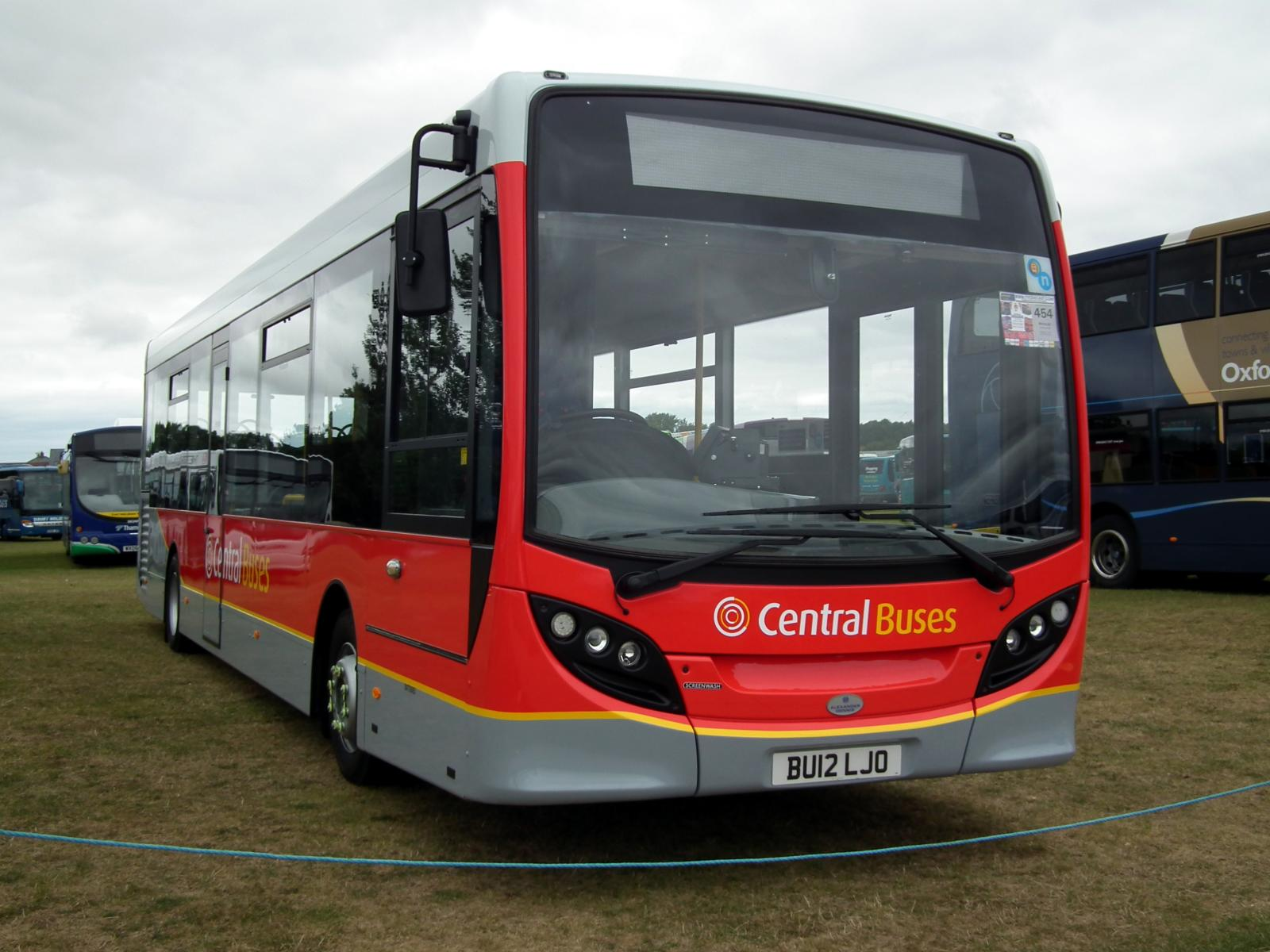
- Alexander Dennis Enviro 200 in September 2012
- Parent: Geoff Cross
- Founded: September 2003
- Defunct: 24 February 2018
- Headquarters: Perry Barr
- Service area: Birmingham; Coventry; Staffordshire; Warwickshire; Worcestershire; Shropshire
- Service type: Bus operator
- Routes: 23 (February 2018)
- Depots: 3
- Fleet: 31 (February 2018)
- Website: www.centralbuses.com

Central Buses was a bus company based in Birmingham, England.

== History ==
Central Buses was founded in September 2003 by 16-year-old Geoff Cross.

Later, a separate arm of the company was created. Centrad was created under the CEN Group brand, which Central Buses also joined. This supplies electronic equipment to the bus industry.

Many of the services operated by Central Buses were operated under contract to Transport for West Midlands. All buses were equipped to use prepaid fare cards.

In February 2018, Central Buses was purchased by Rotala for £1.95 million, with its 23 services and 31 buses taken over by its Diamond West Midlands subsidiary. Operations ceased at the conclusion of services on 24 February 2018.

== Fleet ==
As of February 2018, the fleet consisted of 31 buses. Fleet livery was red and grey.
