= Hugh de Mortimer =

Anglo-Norman nobleman

Hugh de Mortimer (1117 – 26 February 1180/81) was a Norman English medieval lord.

== Lineage ==
Hugh was the son of Hugh de Mortimer. He was lord of Wigmore Castle, Stratfield Mortimer, Cleobury Mortimer and at times, Bridgnorth, Bishop's Castle and Maelienydd.

== Anarchy ==
During the Anarchy of King Stephen's reign, Hugh was an supporter of Stephen until at least 1148. This was because Wigmore Castle had been confiscated from his father by King Henry I. He only seems to have returned to England from his Norman estates in 1137.

== Private Wars ==
Hugh did quarrel violently with his neighbouring lords, most notably with Miles, earl of Hereford, Miles' son Roger, and Josce de Dinan, lord of Ludlow. The latter ambushed Hugh and only released him after the payment of a substantial ransom. During this time, Hugh also took over the royal castle at Bridgnorth.

== Opposition to King Henry II ==
Hugh was one of the barons who objected to Henry II's demand for the return of royal castles in 1155. Henry II launched a campaign in May 1155 against Hugh, simultaneously besieging his three principal castles of Wigmore, Bridgnorth and Cleobury. On 7 July 1155, Hugh formally submitted to Henry II at the Council at Bridgnorth.

== Marriage and children ==
Between 1148 and 1155, Hugh married Maud le Meschin (also known as Maud/Matilde du Bessin), daughter of William Meschin, Lord of Skipton, Yorkshire, and Cecily de Rumilly. Maud (Matilda) was the widow of Philip Belmeis of Tong. Hugh and Maud's son Roger Mortimer of Wigmore succeeded his father as lord of Wigmore. Hugh and Maud had three other sons, Hugh (killed in a tournament), Ralph, and William. The elder Hugh may have died 26 Feb 1180/81 in Cleobury Mortimer, Shropshire, England, and was buried at Wigmore.

== Sources ==
- Gees, Loveday Lewes (2002). Women, Art, and Patronage from Henry III to Edward III, 1216–1377. The Boydell Press. ISBN 9780851158617.
- Lieberman, Max (2010). The Medieval March of Wales: The Creation and Perception of a Frontier, 1066–1283. Cambridge University Press. ISBN 9781139486897.
- Warren, W. L. (1973). Henry II. University of California Press. ISBN 0-520-03494-5.
