= River Rea, Shropshire =

River in Shropshire and Worcestershire, England

River Rea River Neen
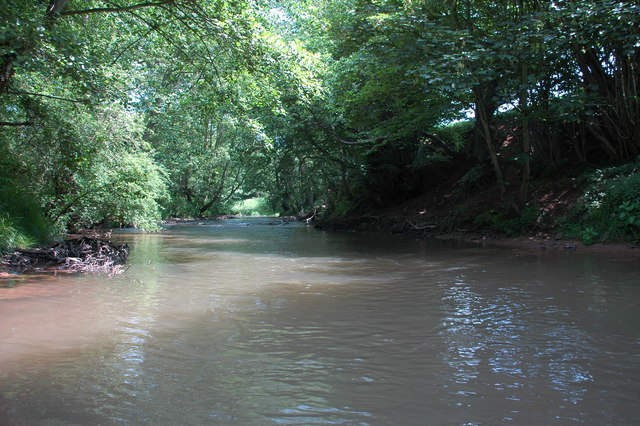
- The Rea near Nineveh

Location
- Country: England
- Counties: Shropshire, Worcestershire

Physical characteristics
- Mouth
  - location: confluence with River Teme

Basin features
- Tributaries
  - right: Pudding Brook, Rowley Brook, Mill Brook

The River Rea is a small river that flows through south east Shropshire, England.

== Course ==
It passes just to the east of the small market town of Cleobury Mortimer and just south of the Hamlet (place) of Neen Savage, before entering the Teme at Newnham Bridge in Worcestershire. Its waters eventually reach the Bristol Channel, via the Severn. The upper stretch of the river is known as the Rea Brook (not to be confused with the Rea Brook which flows from Marton Pool to the River Severn in Shrewsbury). For a short stretch between Cleobury Mortimer and Neen Sollars the river forms part of the Shropshire-Worcestershire border.

It is crossed (at 52.387401°N 2.478847°W) by the Elan aqueduct.

== Etymology ==
The name of the river derives from a root found in many Indo-European languages and means "to run" or "to flow".

The historic or alternative name for the river is the River Neen and there are three settlements along its course which take its name: Neen Sollars, Neenton and Neen Savage. This name appears to come from Brythonic *Nein-, which could mean either washing or snowing.
