= Cleobury Mortimer =

Town in Shropshire, England

Coordinates: 52.3785°N 2.4821°W

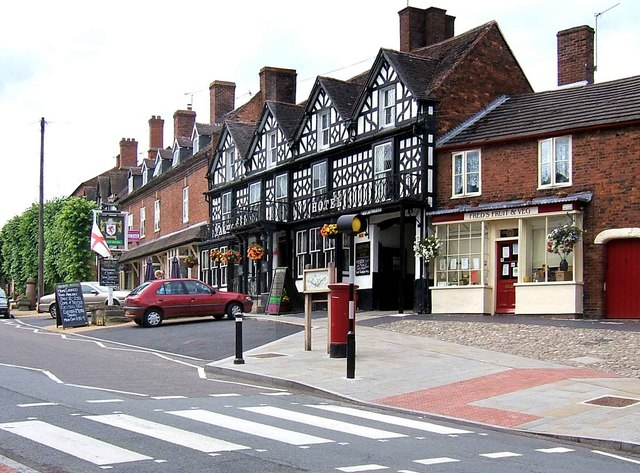
- High Street and the Talbot Hotel

- Location within Shropshire
- Population: 3,036 (2011)
- OS grid reference: SO675758
- Civil parish: Cleobury Mortimer
- Unitary authority: Shropshire
- Ceremonial county: Shropshire
- Region: West Midlands
- Country: England
- Sovereign state: United Kingdom
- Post town: KIDDERMINSTER
- Postcode district: DY14
- Dialling code: 01299
- Police: West Mercia
- Fire: Shropshire
- Ambulance: West Midlands
- UK Parliament: South Shropshire

Cleobury Mortimer (/ˈklɪbri/, KLIH-bree) is a market town and civil parish in southeastern Shropshire, England, which had a population of 3,036 at the 2011 census. It was granted a market charter by King Henry III in 1226.

== History ==
The name is believed to derive from the contraction of the Old English clifu meaning a steep place and bury meaning fortified settlement. Mortimer comes from Ranulph de Mortimer of Normandy to whom the land was granted after the Norman Conquest. He founded the Mortimer dynasty of marcher lords who held power in the Welsh Marches throughout the Middle Ages and were closely involved with power struggles with successive English monarchs and other powerful Lords. Cleobury has a significant entry in the Domesday Book, and the vicinity was the location of at least two castles. Cleobury Castle, which was situated near St Mary's Church, was destroyed in 1155 and only earthworks remain today. Toot Castle was situated on the other side of the River Rea from the town.

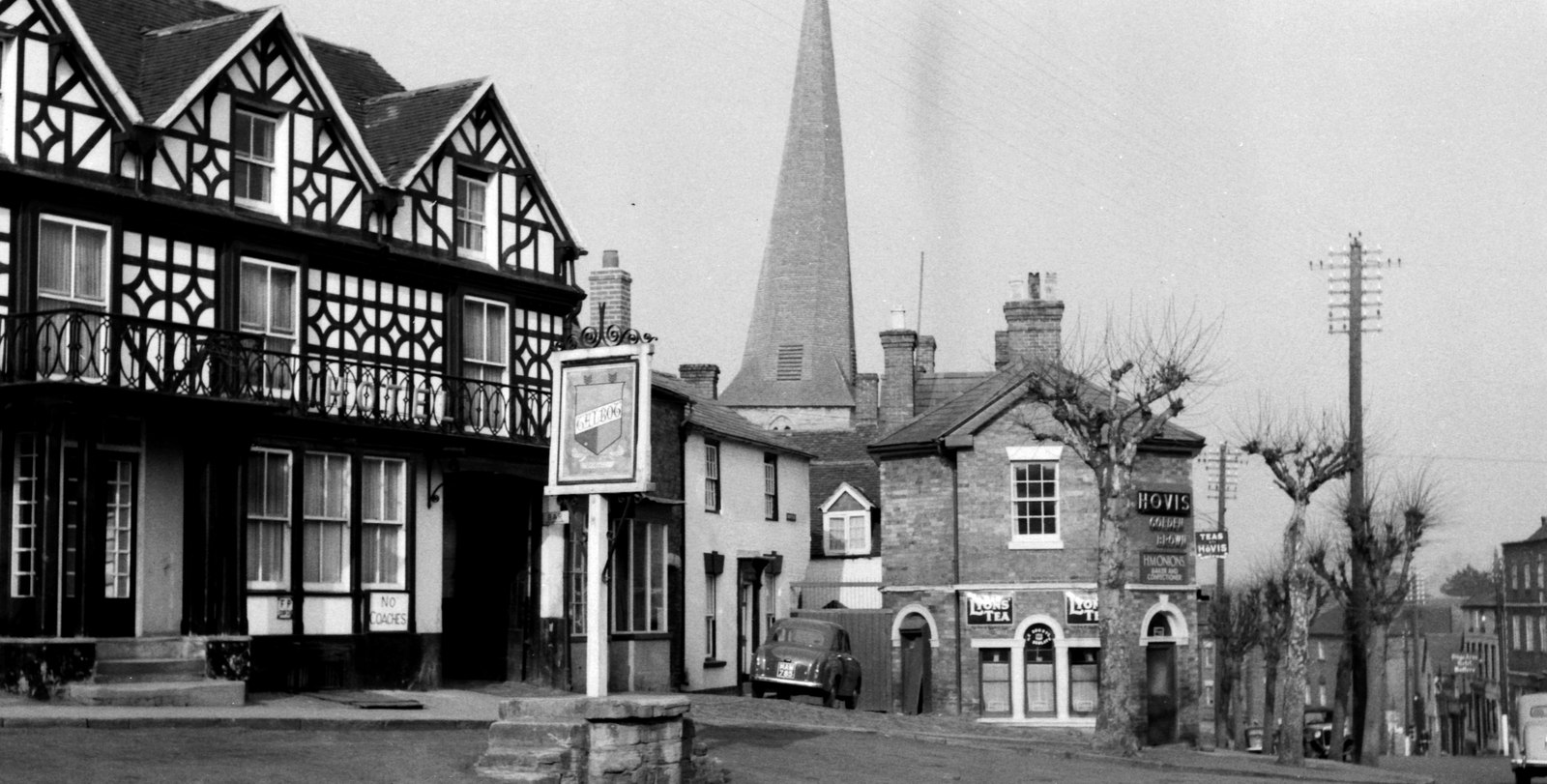
The centre of Cleobury in 1950

The central section of the town was laid out in burgage plots, the lines of which are still evident. With the decline of the marcher lords, and peace along the Welsh border, Cleobury's importance declined during the Middle Ages, leaving it as an undistinguished market town, albeit with a dependent hinterland. In the 16th century, exploitation of local iron ores became important, and when Elizabeth I granted the town to Robert Dudley, Earl of Leicester, his familiarity with modern ironworking technology led to the establishment of an important iron industry, with at least two furnaces (in which iron ore was converted to pig iron) and two water-powered forges (in which pig iron was converted to wrought iron). For a while, Cleobury's iron industry was an important part of the general industrialisation in Shropshire (sometimes claimed as the seat of the Industrial Revolution), and iron from Cleobury's forges was valued as a high-quality material. However, poor transport connections led to the decline of Cleobury's iron industry in the early 19th century, and soon the town reverted to being an agricultural hub, although a large water-powered paper mill survived on the River Rea until a catastrophic fire towards the end of the century. By 1900, the town was an important civic centre, with a railway station, union workhouse, magistrates' court, police station, agricultural college, infants' school and primary school. Since the start of the twentieth century, Cleobury lost many of these facilities, although its population has grown. It thus exemplifies a common pattern for rural settlements, where centralisation and the rise of road transport have seen a decline in the local provision of services, despite a rising population.

Two literary figures have strong connections with Cleobury: William Langland and Simon Evans. Langland, a contemporary of Geoffrey Chaucer, is believed to have been born in the vicinity in the 14th century, and is commemorated in the very fine and intricate (Victorian) East Window of St Mary's Church, as well as in a local road name. Simon Evans is a 20th-century writer, who fought throughout the First World War, and suffered from being gassed. He had been a postman on Merseyside before the war, and after the war sought a rural postal round, to soothe both nerves and body. Cleobury suited him well; here he blossomed, took a correspondence course in English, and became a successful writer and radio broadcaster in the 1930s. Heath Cranton published five of his books, and he married 'Auntie Doris' (Aldridge), a radio performer, but his new life was cut short in 1940, when the effects of the gassing finally caught up with him. His legacy is visible in the naming of a local street, a plaque on the old Post Office, and a dedicated local walk—'The Simon Evans Way'—which the CM Footpath Association has created in recent years.

== Geography ==
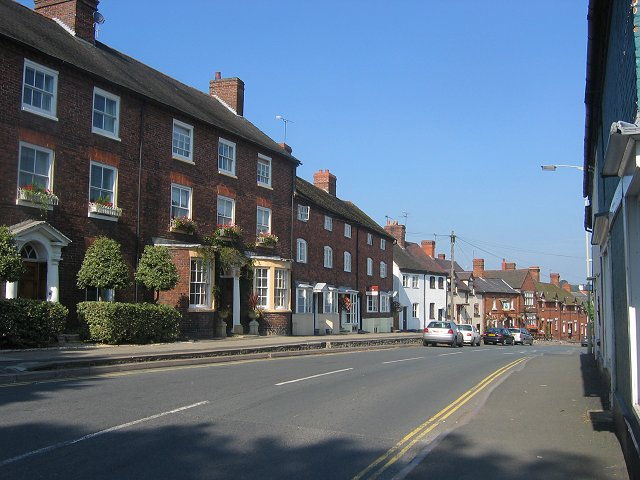
The A4117 as it passes through the town

The River Rea runs to the east of the town, whilst through the town itself is the Pudding (or Burrell) Brook, which flows from west to east before meeting the Rea. The land gradually rises from 110 metres above sea level near to the river, to 150 metres in the west of the town. The Clee Hills, the highest hills in Shropshire, are nearby and the Wyre Forest lies between the town and Bewdley. The border with Worcestershire is a mile to the south.

The A4117 Kidderminster to Ludlow road runs through the centre of the town and crosses the River Rea at New Bridge. The B4363 runs between Cleobury Mortimer (its junction with the A4117 being immediately east of New Bridge) and Bridgnorth. The county town, Shrewsbury, is some 33 miles (53 km) distant by road, making Cleobury the most distant town from Shrewsbury in the county.

Cleobury was formerly served by two now-defunct railways: the Tenbury & Bewdley Railway and the Cleobury Mortimer and Ditton Priors Light Railway. The opening of the latter in 1908 elevated Cleobury Mortimer station (which was located some distance from the town, in the Wyre Forest) to the status of a 'Junction'. A separate station called Cleobury Town Halt existed nearer the town, but only on the Ditton Priors line. Today the nearest railway stations are on the heritage Severn Valley Railway, with the nearest mainline stations at Ludlow and Kidderminster. There is a regular bus service (Diamond Bus 292) that runs between Ludlow and Kidderminster via Cleobury. This was at one time part of a much longer service which operated between Hereford and Birmingham but was divided into separate routes several years ago.

The civil parish of Cleobury Mortimer has no notable settlements, other than the town itself, though it covers a large rural area including part of the Wyre Forest. In 2017, the parish council officially gave notice to Shropshire Council that it would thereafter be styled Cleobury Mortimer Town Council, although it does not elect a mayor.

To the north lie the settlements of Neenton and Neen Savage, and to the south-west lies the small village of Neen Sollars. "Neen" was the name of the River Rea in the past. Further to the north lies Cleobury North, a small village with the same etymological root.

== Governance ==
An electoral ward of the same name exists. This ward stretches mainly to the north and at the 2011 census had a population of 7,226.

== Landmarks and amenities ==
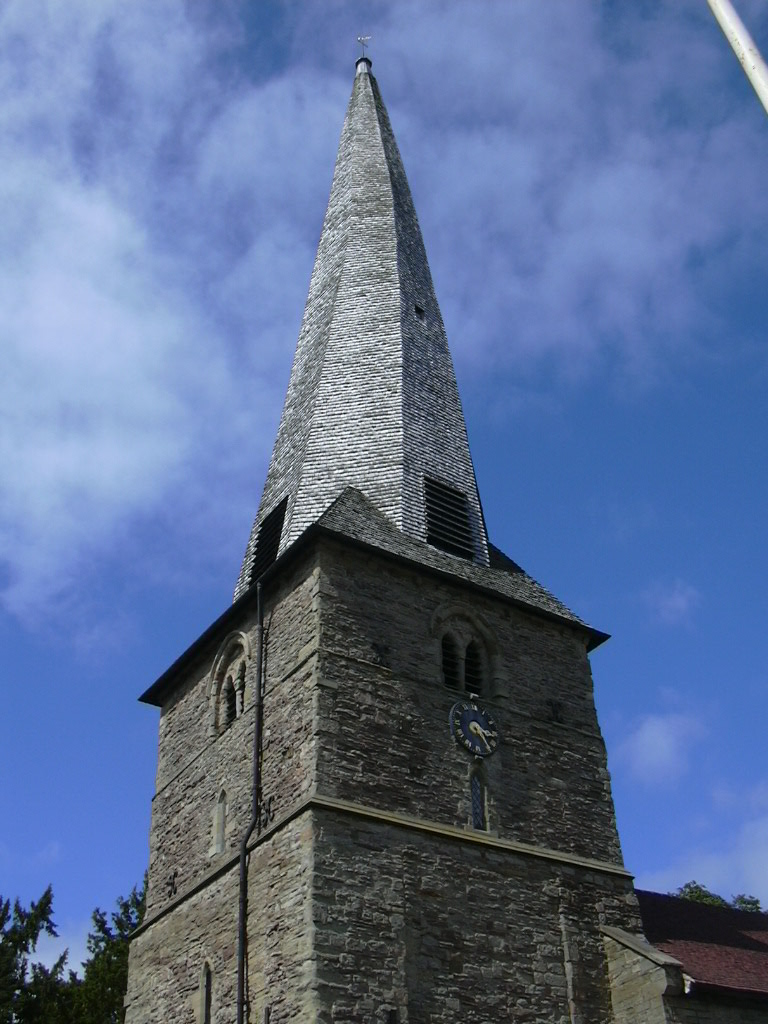
The crooked spire on St Mary's Church

There are a number of landmarks in the town, the most famous of which is the 12th-century St Mary's Church in the town centre, renowned for its crooked spire, the combined result of the warping of its oak timbers, and damp-induced rot where the timber spire sits on the masonry tower. Across the road from the churchyard is The Wells, fed from a local spring and for centuries serving as a public water supply. In 2010, for reasons as yet unexplained, the inflow to The Wells ceased for a while, and has only been intermittent since then. To the west of the church is the recently refurbished Market Hall, which now houses a number of facilities including the Tourist Information Centre.

There are six public houses in the town of Cleobury, with a further one (the Blount Arms) on the A4117 road in the direction of Kidderminster. The town also has a secondary school, Lacon Childe, a primary school, a library, a post office and a fire station; until 2014 it also had a police station.

The town featured in a series of reports by Declan Curry in BBC Breakfast in June 2006. As part of the series, Curry interviewed a number of local residents and business owners to learn more about the rural economy.

== Brewery ==
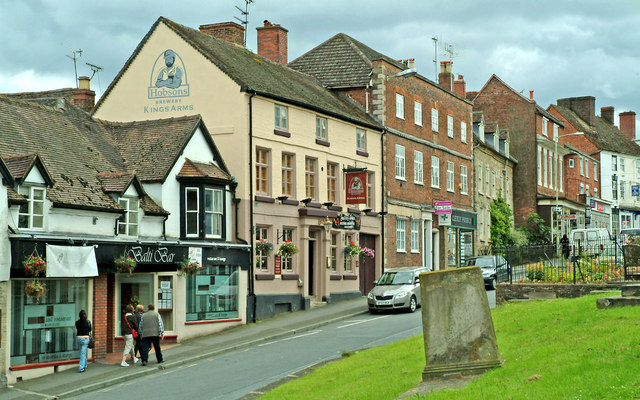
The King's Arms with St Mary's churchyard in the foreground

Hobsons brewery was established in 1993 and moved to its present site at New House Farm, on Tenbury Road approximately 500 metres south-west of the town centre, in 1995. The brewery brews and delivers its beer to public houses within a 50-mile radius, as well as bottle-conditioned ale to shops throughout the UK. Its regular mild, best bitter and strong bitter (Old Henry) ales have won taste awards, and the mild was chosen to be a guest beer in the House of Commons bar in 2008. Hobsons produce a bottle-only mild ale, named in honour of Simon Evans, called Postman's Knock. In 2009, the brewery installed a small wind turbine, which generates around a third of the electricity required by the brewery, and the company use other environmentally sustainable technologies. The King's Arms in the town became the brewery tap in 2007 and was the first pub to receive a delivery of Hobsons beer in 1993. Hobsons also produce two special beers for the local heritage railway, the Severn Valley Railway.

== Media ==
Local news and television programmes are provided by BBC West Midlands and ITV Central. Television signals are received from either the Sutton Coldfield or The WrekinTV transmitters.

Local radio stations are BBC Radio Shropshire, Heart West Midlands, Smooth West Midlands, Hits Radio Black Country & Shropshire, Sunshine Radio, and Greatest Hits Radio Black Country & Shropshire.

The town is served by the local newspaper, Shropshire Star.

== Notable people ==
- Hugh de Mortimer (before 1117–1180/81), Norman English medieval baron and local lord
- Oliver Mathews (c. 1520 – c. 1618), Welsh apothecary and chronicler, owned land and tithings of Cleobury Mortimer 1580–1602
- William Hayley (1683–1715) of Cleobury Mortimer, Church of England priest and dean of Chichester Cathedral
- Edward Northey (1755–1828), Vicar of Cleobury Mortimer and Canon of Windsor 1797–1828
- Thomas Botfield (1762–1843), English metallurgist, geologist, magistrate and deputy-lieutenant of Shropshire, went to school in Cleobury Mortimer.
- Simon Evans (1895–1940), postman with the GPO in Cleobury Mortimer and a writer and broadcaster on country life
- Richard Cartwright-Jones (1916 – 2004 in Cleobury Mortimer), English cricketer, made a first-class appearance for Warwickshire
- John David Brewer (born 1951), English sociologist, academic and author, brought up in Cleobury Mortimer
- Chris Rokos (born 1970), leading hedge fund operator, lives partly in Cleobury Mortimer

== See also ==
- Listed buildings in Cleobury Mortimer
