= Sharples =

Sharples may refer to:

== People ==
- Adam Sharples (born 1954), British executive
- Charlie Sharples (born 1989), English rugby union footballer
- Eliza Sharples (1803–1852), British writer and lecturer on freethought, radical politics and women's rights
- Ellen Sharples (1769–1849), English painter
- George Sharples (1943–2020), English footballer
- James Sharples (disambiguation)
- Jeff Sharples (born 1967), Canada former National Hockey League player
- John Sharples (disambiguation)
- Katrina Sharples, New Zealand biostatistician and violist
- Kayla Sharples (born 1997), American soccer player
- Linda Sharples, British statistician
- Mike Sharples (born 1952), British academic
- Pamela Sharples, Baroness Sharples (1923–2022), wife of Richard Sharples
- Philip M. Sharples (1857–1944), American inventor and industrialist
- Pita Sharples (born 1941), Maori academic and politician
- Richard Sharples (1916–1973), British politician assassinated while Governor of Bermuda
- Robert Sharples (1913–1987), British musical conductor, composer and bandleader
- Robert Sharples (classicist) (1949–2010), English educator and authority on ancient Greek philosophy
- Rolinda Sharples (1793–1838), English painter
- Winston Sharples (1909–1978), American composer known for his work with animated shorts

== Fictional characters ==
- Carrie Sharples, on the television series Alice
- Ena Sharples, on the British soap opera Coronation Street
- Mel Sharples, diner owner and cook in the film Alice Doesn't Live Here Anymore and the television series Alice

== Places ==
- Sharples, Alberta, Canada, a ghost town
- Sharples, Greater Manchester, United Kingdom, a suburb of Bolton
- Sharples, West Virginia, United States, an unincorporated community

== Other uses ==
- Sharples School, a co-educational secondary school in the Sharples area of Bolton in the English county of Greater Manchester

== See also ==
- Sharples Separator Works, a factory complex in West Chester, Pennsylvania, United States, on the National Register of Historic Places
