= James Sharples =

James Sharples may refer to:

- James Sharples (portrait painter) (1751/52–1811), English portrait painter and pastelist
- James Sharples (blacksmith) (1825–1893), English blacksmith and self-taught artist and engraver
- James Sharples (footballer) (1872-1920), English footballer, see List of Manchester City F.C. players (25–99 appearances)
- James Sharples (cricketer) (1890–1969), English cricketer who played for Glamorgan
- Sir James Sharples (police officer), chief constable (1989–1998) of Merseyside Police
- James Sharples (bishop) (1797–1850), Coadjutor Vicar Apostolic of the Lancashire District
