= Joan Buckland =

English estate manager with surviving will (d. 1462)

Joan Buckland ({nne} Gifford; died 1462) was an English landowner and estate manager who held tenements in London, Northamptonshire and Essex, and who engaged in legal battles against royalty and aristocracy in order to collect money owed to her late husband. She is particularly known for her detailed will, which provides an insight into the contents of a fifteenth-century manor and into women’s book ownership.

== Life ==
=== Early and married life ===
Arms of the Worshipful Company of Fishmongers

Joan was born sometime between 1381 and 1395, the eldest daughter of London fishmonger Richard Gifford and his wife Agnes. She had three siblings: Thomas, John and Cecily. They grew up in Distaff Lane, where her parents contributed to the renewal of St Paul’s Cathedral. She was not of age when her father died in 1399. Her mother survived him by 27 years in an independent and active widowhood, making property transactions and owning shops. Thomas became a fishmonger while John and Cecily became a canon and prioress, indicating that the children had some formal education. Joan became landlady of a tenement left to her by her father.

By 1407 Joan had married another fishmonger, Richard Buckland, who was a colleague of Joan’s tenant, John Hill. The marriage benefited Buckland both in terms of Joan’s wealth and her connections in the Worshipful Company of Fishmongers: John Hill helped him get elected as a member there in 1409. Buckland served as victualler of Calais and supplied ships, household items, and exotic animals to Henry V, as well as capturing cargoes of Spanish ships during wartime. They had a daughter, Agnes, who was married to Robert Whittingham (later Sir Robert) by 1420.

Joan’s mother Agnes died in 1427, making Joan executor of her will in preference to her brothers. Joan was responsible for Agnes' religious bequests, including the foundation of a chantry in Oxford, and for Cecily's upkeep. She also inherited property from her brother Thomas when he died in 1435, although this time she refused to act as executor of his will.

=== Estate management and legal activities ===
A bejewelled gold reliquary cross

When Richard Buckland died in 1436, Joan inherited most of his property in London and Northamptonshire. The main properties, where Joan had been joint owner while Richard was alive, were a waterfront tenement with a quay in Wynges Lane, London; the manor of Edgcote in Northamptonshire; and the manor of Copthall in Little Wigborough, Essex. The first executor in his will, Joan was responsible for legal action over her husband’s trading ventures and distributing £200 to the Universities of Oxford and Cambridge.

Joan’s main challenge was to collect money owed to Buckland by the crown for his work in Calais. In 1441 she received £2,790 from the crown, a royal writ noting that 'the said Johane hath be longe tyme gretly occupied, vexed and put to grete coste for the said accomptes.'

In 1456, she sued Sir John Fastolf, the executor of the will of John of Lancaster, duke of Bedford, over a debt of £1070 which Bedford had failed to repay to Buckland. Winning the case, she was awarded damages including a bejewelled gold reliquary cross worth £340 on the grounds that Bedford’s other executors had refused to pay her.

Joan’s legal activities also demonstrate that she was involved with the management of her country estates, including taking a drover to court in 1451 for a debt of £20.

== Will ==
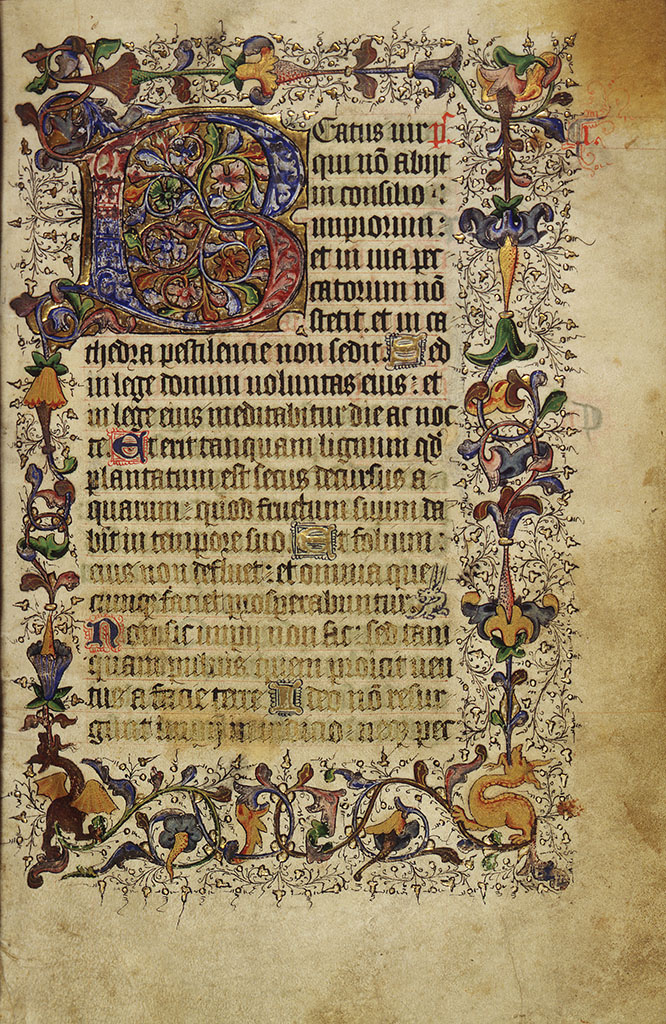
A 15th-century psalter from London

Joan’s will gives a 'vivid' picture of her clothes and household items such as furniture and bed-linen as well as her charitable bequests and donations to the University of Oxford. She had a collection of Latin liturgical texts, including a 'litill psawter' and a theological miscellany now held by the Bodleian Library. Her estate went to her great-granddaughter Margaret Whittingham, who had married Richard Clarell, Richard and Joan Buckland’s former apprentice and close friend.
