= Richard's Castle =

Village in Herefordshire and Shropshire, England

Coordinates: 52.322°N 2.744°W

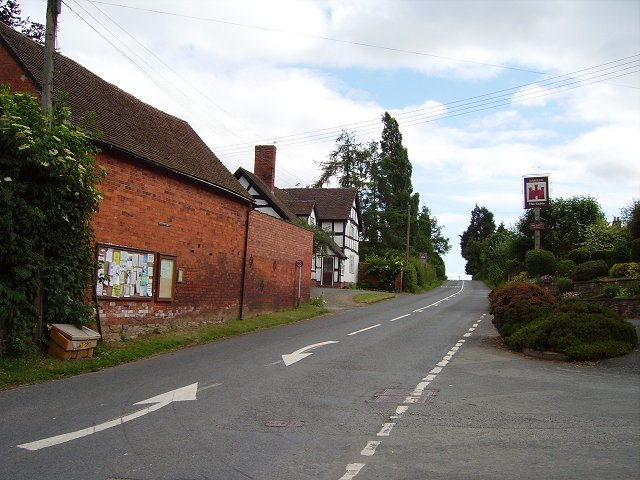
- The B4361 road through the village – the pub is to the right

- Location within Shropshire
- Population: 674 (2011)
- Shropshire: 424
- Herefordshire: 250
- OS grid reference: SO492696
- Civil parish: Richard's Castle
- Unitary authority: Shropshire; Herefordshire
- Ceremonial county: Shropshire; Herefordshire
- Region: West Midlands
- Country: England
- Sovereign state: United Kingdom
- Post town: LUDLOW
- Postcode district: SY8
- Dialling code: 01584
- Police: West Mercia
- Fire: Shropshire
- Ambulance: West Midlands
- UK Parliament: South Shropshire; North Herefordshire

Richard's Castle is a village, castle and two civil parishes on the border of the counties of Herefordshire and Shropshire in England. The Herefordshire part of the parish had a population of 250 at the 2011 census, the Shropshire part, 424.

The village lies on the B4361 road, 5 1/2 miles (8.9 km) south of the historic market town of Ludlow. It is a dispersed settlement, with an older core near the castle, 3/4 mile (1.2 km) to the north-west of the larger main part of the village which is on the B4361. On the B4361 is the village hall, and The Castle Inn traditional public house.

== Castle ==
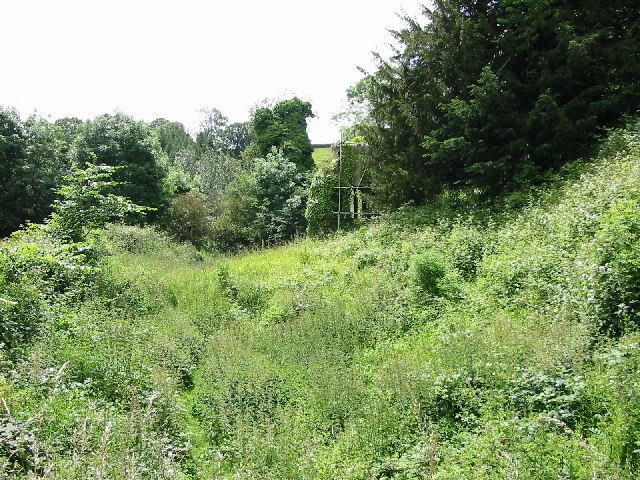
The earthworks of Richard's Castle

Today the fortress is reduced mainly to its earthworks and foundations. A polygonal keep stood on the high motte or mound. This was reached possibly via a semi-circular barbican. The bailey wall still stands twenty feet high in places and there are remains of several towers and an early gatehouse around the perimeter. There, earthwork remains of an outer ward enclose the church (St Bartholomew's) and a borough defence.

=== History ===
Richard Scrob was a Norman knight granted lands by the Saxon King Edward the Confessor before the Norman Conquest, in Herefordshire, Worcestershire and Shropshire as recorded in the Domesday Book of 1086. He built Richard's Castle before 1051. The castle was a motte-and-bailey style construction, one of only three or four castles of this type built before the Norman conquest. Most were built after the conquest. Richard was last mentioned in 1067. His castle passed to his son, Osbern Fitz Richard, who married Nest, the daughter of King Gruffydd ap Llywelyn of Wales and Ealdgytha of Mercia.

Osbern died around 1137 and was succeeded by his grandson, Osbern Fitz Hugh (married to Amice Clifford, a sister of Rosamond Clifford), who died in 1187. Richard's Castle then passed to his marital brother-in-law, Hugh de Say (married to Lucy Clifford), who died in 1190, leaving the barony to his son, another Hugh Say. Thus the castle passed out of the line of descent of Richard Fitz Scrob. In 1196 this Hugh fought at the battle at New Radnor and was probably killed there, his castles eventually passing to Robert de Mortimer of Attleborough. In 1264 his son, Hugh Mortimer, was forced to surrender himself and Richard's Castle to Simon de Montfort, 6th Earl of Leicester. His grandson, the last Hugh Mortimer of Richard's Castle, was poisoned to death by his wife in 1304. The castle then passed to the Talbots, through Richard Talbot's marriage to Joan Mortimer. On 3 December 1329, Joan late the wife of Richard Thalebot, had noted in the Patent Rolls that she planned to leave Richard's Castle to John de Wotton, chaplain, and William Balle of Underlith, in fee simple. The Talbots were still living there in the late 14th century. Sir William de Vaux, High Sheriff of Northamptonshire, died in Richard's Castle in 1460. By the 16th century it was in ruins.

Richard's Castle belonged to the manor of Avretone (Overton), which was recorded in the Domesday Book of 1086 as being entirely part of the hundred of Cutestornes, a hundred of Herefordshire. Around the time of Henry I (1100–1139) the hundreds of Shropshire were greatly reformed and the hundred of Munslow was created; this hundred took in part of the parish of Richard's Castle (including Overton and Woofferton), causing the division of the parish and village between the counties that remains to the present day, as the remainder of the parish became part of the Herefordshire hundred of Wolphy. Whilst the neighbouring parish of Ludford, which had also been divided into Munslow/Shropshire and Wolphy/Herefordshire parts, was unified fully into Shropshire in 1895, no such unification of Richard's Castle occurred.

A market charter had been granted by King John, but this has long fallen into disuse. Markets were held on The Green, which is still a public and open piece of land, situated near the church and castle.

== Geography ==
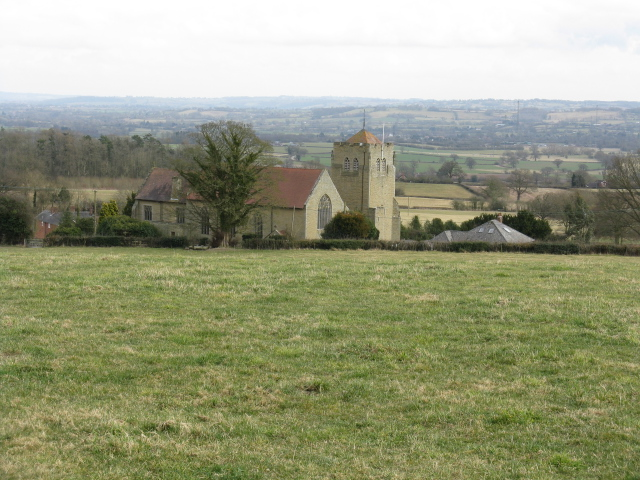
All Saints' Church and the countryside towards Woofferton and the River Teme, viewed from Batchcott

The village lies on the western edge of the Teme valley, with the castle and older part of the village higher in elevation (180 metres (590 ft) above sea level) than the present-day core of the village situated on the B4361 road (at an elevation of 100 metres (330 ft)).

Much of the village lies in Herefordshire, however there are two civil parishes named after Richard's Castle, one on the Herefordshire side of the county border called Richard's Castle (Hereford), and the other called Richard's Castle (Shropshire) (or "Richard's Castle (Salop)" historically). Both have their own parish council, which work together on some issues for the combined Richard's Castle community. The parish councils have the same parish clerk.

The castle ruins, St Bartholomew's Church, the Castle Inn pub,the former Methodist chapel and the Court House Dovecote lie in the Herefordshire half, whilst the Shropshire side includes All Saints' Church, the Village Hall and the former primary school. The Shropshire civil parish includes the villages of Overton and Woofferton, the hamlets of Batchcott and Mitnell, as well as Wheatcommon, Moor Park and McCartneys auction centre. The Herefordshire civil parish includes Haye Park, which forms an almost detached part. Hanway Common is divided between the two parishes, with the county boundary running through it.

The Woofferton transmitting station, a notable feature of the area's landscape, spreads across the county boundary and is located in both of the Richard's Castle civil parishes.

The Welsh Marches Line runs through the currently closed Woofferton railway station with Transport for Wales Rail services calling at Leominster and Ludlow only.

== Religion ==
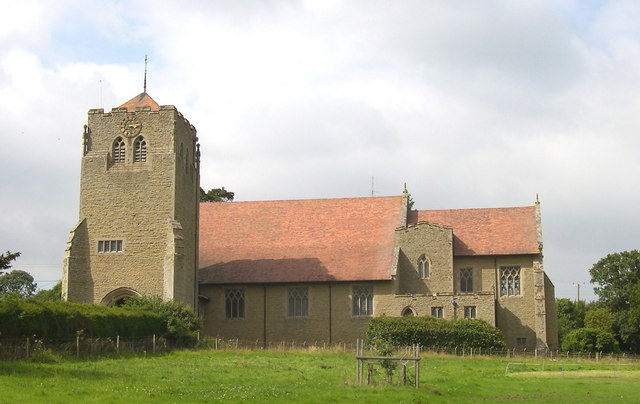
All Saints' Church, Richard's Castle

The original parish church, sited within Herefordshire, was St Bartholomew's Church situated close to and east of the castle. The church was founded by either Richard Fitz Scrobe or his son. The chancel was probably built in 1362. The north transept was probably consecrated in 1351 by Bishop John de Trillek. This was the Chantry Chapel of the local Knights Templar. The south aisle was built between 1310 and 1320. There is a detached bell tower (one of six in the county) that dates from the second half of the 13th century. The church is between it and the castle. There are no openings in the bell tower between it and the castle. (See the Hereford Cathedral Library). The church is now redundant.

The current parish church is All Saints, designed by the notable architect Richard Norman Shaw, and opened in 1892. It is situated north of the village, within Shropshire, in the Batchcott area, by the side of the B4361 road and is a Grade I Listed building. The triptych (1892–3) is a masterpiece by Charles Edgar Buckeridge.

Writer Richard Gifford (1723–1807) was a curate in the parish in the 18th century.

There was also a Primitive Methodist chapel, which is now a dwelling.

== Education ==
Moor Park School is a preparatory school in the Shropshire parish, between the villages of Richard's Castle and Overton.

Richard's Castle once had a primary school, which was adjacent to the present-day village hall.

== Sport ==
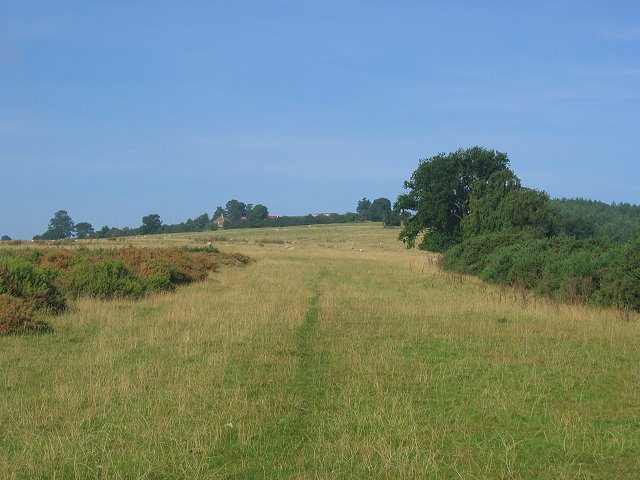
Hanway Common, spanning the county border.

=== Soap Box Derby ===
A motorless car race takes place at Hanway Common in mid-July. The annual event was first held in 2004.

== See also ==
- Listed buildings in Richard's Castle (Shropshire)
