= Listed buildings in Bishop's Castle =

Bishop's Castle is a civil parish in Shropshire, England. It contains 85 listed buildings that are recorded in the National Heritage List for England. Of these, five are listed at Grade II*, the middle of the three grades, and the others are at Grade II, the lowest grade. The parish contains the small market town of Bishop's Castle and the surrounding countryside, and all but three of the listed buildings are in the town. Most of these are houses and other buildings that are basically timber framed dating from the 16th and 17th centuries, and usually encased, refaced or extended later. The other listed buildings include the remains of a castle, a church and items in the churchyard, farmhouses and farm buildings, a hotel and public houses, a shop, a brewery, the town hall, two milestones, and a telephone kiosk.

== Key ==
Grade	Criteria
II*	Particularly important buildings of more than special interest
II	Buildings of national importance and special interest

== Buildings ==
Name and location	Photograph	Date	Notes	Grade
Remains of Castle; 52.49525°N 2.99863°W		c. 1100	What remains of the castle are earthworks and sections of walls between 20 feet (6.1 m) and 3 feet (0.91 m) high, some scattered behind the surrounding houses. The site of the motte has been converted into a bowling green.	II
St John's Church; 52.48953°N 2.99836°W		Medieval	The oldest part of the church is the tower, which was largely rebuilt in the 17th century. The body of the church was rebuilt in 1859–60 in Decorated style. The church is built in limestone with slate roofs, and consists of a nave with a clerestory, north and south aisles, a north porch, transeptal chapels, north and south vestries, a chancel with a polygonal apse, and a west tower. The tower has two stages, a west door, string courses, an octagonal clock face on the north front, a coped embattled parapet, a pyramidal roof, and a weathervane.	II*
25 and 27 Church Street; 52.49175°N 2.99812°W	—	16th century	A house, refaced, rebuilt and extended in the 19th century, and divided into two houses. It is timber framed on a limestone plinth, encased in brick and roughcast, and has a slate roof. There are two storeys, a probable hall to the left, a cross-wing to the right, and a 19th-century extension further to the right. The windows are casements, and in the extension is a doorway with pilasters, a frieze, and a cornice.	II
63 Church Street; 52.49264°N 2.99791°W	—	16th century	A house, later part of a shop, it has been extended and refaced. The original part is timber framed and roughcast, the extensions are in brick, all is stuccoed, and it has a slate roof, hipped to the east. There are two storeys, three bays at right angles to the road, and an extension to the east. Facing the road is a shop front in the ground floor, angled round the corner, and a sash window above. Along the sides are windows, some of which are sashes, some are casements, and there is a half-dormer.	II
25 High Street; 52.49369°N 2.99809°W	—	Mid 16th century	A house, later used for other purposes, it was extended in the 19th century. It is in roughcast timber framing on a limestone plinth with some refacing in brick, and has a roof in slate and stone-slate. The building is at right angles to the road, and has two storeys and five bays. The front facing the road is gabled and has a shop front in the ground floor and a sash window above. Along the north front are three casement windows and a doorway.	II
20 Market Square; 52.49454°N 2.99829°W	—	16th century	The house, at one time incorporating a bakery, was expanded in each of the following three centuries. The older part is timber framed, the later part is in stone, all rendered, and with roofs partly of stone slabs and partly of slate. The older part has two storeys and four bays, the portion to the right has three storeys, a basement, and one bay, and at the rear is a later two-storey block. There are some casement windows, but most windows are sashes.	II
Barn adjoining Hill Ridge; 52.49517°N 2.99699°W	—	16th century	The barn is timber framed, encased in limestone and brick and rendered, and it has a slate roof. The barn contains a casement window, a boarded door, a boarded loft door, and inserted garage doors. Inside is a full cruck truss.	II
The House on Crutches and 41 High Street; 52.49430°N 2.99812°W		16th century	A house that was altered and extended in the 19th century and used for other purposes. It is timber framed with wattle and daub infill, on a limestone plinth, it was partly rebuilt in limestone and rendered, and it has a slate roof. There are two storeys, and two or three bays at right angles to the road. The eastern bay projects over the road, it is supported on two posts, and the upper floor is jettied. There are some sash windows, but most windows are casements.	II*
The Porch House; 52.49404°N 2.99808°W		1564	A house, later a shop, it is timber framed with rendered infill, roughcast on the left, on a limestone plinth, and a slate roof. There have been alterations and additions, including a restoration in the 20th century involving the use of red brick and steel posts. The basic structure has an L-shaped plan, with a hall and a cross-wing to the left, with two storeys, a basement and attic. There are two floors, the upper floor with a continuous jetty, and a single dormer in the roof. The porch has a jettied gable, a bressumer with carved decoration, and inside is a seat. The windows are casements.	II*
58 Church Street; 52.49225°N 2.99773°W	—	Late 16th century	A timber framed house with rendered infill, partly rendered and partly refaced in limestone, and with a slate roof. There are two bays at right angles to the street, and two storeys. The front facing the road has a jettied gable with a moulded bressumer and a carved bracket, and above the ground floor is another moulded bressumer. The front contains an oriel window in the upper floor and casement windows and a doorway in the ground floor.	II
Blunden Hall and Old Hall Cottage; 52.48922°N 2.99504°W	—	Late 16th century (probable)	A house, later extended and divided into two, it is timber framed with plaster infill, a slate-hung gable end, and extensions in rendered limestone with red brick dressings, and in red brick with stone dressings. The house has an H-shaped plan, consisting of a central hall range with three bays flanked by three-bay cross-wings. There are two storeys, and in places the upper floor and the gables are jettied. Most of the windows are casements, and there are also sash windows and segmental-headed cross-windows.	II*
Harp House; 52.49116°N 2.99800°W	—	Late 16th century	The house was partly refaced in the 18th century and extended in the 19th century. It is timber framed with brick nogging in the cross-wing to the left, and with a rendered hall to the right. The cross-wing has one storey and an attic, the hall has two storeys, and the rear extension also has an attic. The roof is in stone-slate and slate, and the upper floor and the gable of the cross-wing are jettied. Most windows are casements, and there are also sash windows, some of them horizontally-sliding. Inside the hall range is a cruck truss.	II
Three Tuns Inn; 52.49459°N 2.99690°W		Late 16th century	A house, later a public house, it is timber framed, rebuilt to the left in limestone and brick and rendered, with a slate roof, hipped to the right. It has an L-shaped plan, probably a two-bay hall and service bay and a two-bay cross-wing. There are two storeys and attics. In the upper floor are a sash window and a casement window, and in the attic are two gabled dormers with slate-hung sides. The ground floor contains a doorway with a bracketed hood, a sash window, and a shop front with a doorway. On the chimney stack in the left return is a plaque commemorating Queen Victoria's Diamond Jubilee.	II
50 and 52 Church Street; 52.49212°N 2.99777°W	—	c. 1600	Two houses that were refaced and extended in the 19th century. They are timber framed and pebbledashed, and have a slate roof. The left part has two storeys and two bays, and there is a later one-bay extension to the right with three storeys over a former carriageway. The windows are casements.	II
54 and 56 Church Street; 52.49217°N 2.99779°W	—	c. 1600	A house that was refaced in the 19th century. It is timber framed and rendered, and has a slate roof. There are two storeys and probably two bays. In the upper floor are two cross-windows, and in the ground floor are two casement windows and two doorways.	II
19–23 High Street; 52.49361°N 2.99804°W	—	c. 1600	Three houses that were altered and refaced in the 19th century. They are timber framed and rendered and have a slate roof. There are two storeys and attics, and on the front are five bays. Nos. 19 and 21 are gabled with shop fronts in the ground floor and sash windows above. No. 23 has a five-light shop window to the right, casement windows in the upper floor, and a sash window in the ground floor.	II
31 High Street; 52.49391°N 2.99808°W	—	c. 1600	A house, later an office, in rendered timber framing with a slate roof. It has three storeys, the upper floors jettied, and two bays. In the ground floor is a 19th-century cast iron shop front that has a recessed central door with a rectangular fanlight, and the windows above are sashes.	II
39 High Street; 52.49426°N 2.99808°W	—	c. 1600	A house, later a shop and a house, in roughcast timber framing with bracketed eaves and a slate roof. It has three storeys, the first floor jettied on the right, and two bays. In the ground floor is a late 19th-century cast iron shop front that has a recessed central door with a rectangular fanlight, and there is a further doorway to the right. In the upper floor are sash windows with moulded surrounds.	II
The Conery; 52.47651°N 2.98143°W	—	c. Early 17th century	The farmhouse was remodelled n the 18th or 19th century. It is timber framed, and in stone and brick, roughcast, and with a slate roof. There is one storey and an attic, and a lean-to outshut to the left. There is one sash window, and the other windows are casements.	II
38 and 40 High Street; 52.49435°N 2.99769°W	—	1629	A house, later a shop and a flat, refaced in the 19th century, stuccoed, and with a slate roof. There is a basement, two storeys and an attic, and four bays. In the ground floor are two shop fronts and a passageway door to the left with a rectangular fanlight and an inscribed lintel. In the upper floor is a sash window in the first bay, a canted bay window in the second bay and cross-windows in the other bays, and in the attic is a dormer.	II
29 Church Street; 52.49183°N 2.99804°W	—	17th century	A house, later a shop, that was refaced in the 19th century. It is in rendered timber framing and has a slate roof. There are two storeys and an attic, a front of two bays, an L-shaped plan, and a one-bay rear extension. In the ground floor is a late 19th-century shop front, and the windows are sashes.	II
43 Church Street; 52.49211°N 2.99797°W	—	17th century (probable)	A house, later an office, that was refaced in the 18th century. It is timber framed and rendered, and has a slate roof. There are three storeys and probably two bays. On the front to the left is a projecting square bay with a shop front and a door to the left with a fanlight. To the right is another doorway with an architrave, a rectangular fanlight and a bracketed hood, and the windows are sashes.	II
47 Church Street; 52.49224°N 2.99800°W	—	17th century	A house and a shop refaced and extended in the 19th century, it is timber framed with brick nogging, stuccoed on the front, and with a slate roof. There are two storeys and two bays, with the upper floor extending over a passageway. The upper floor contains 20th-century casement windows. In the ground floor is a doorway with a pilastered surround and a hood on brackets, to the right is a sash window, and to the right of this is a shop front including a doorway with a pilastered surround, a frieze and a bracketed cornice.	II
53–57 Church Street and Rudge House; 52.49241°N 2.99796°W	—	17th century	Three houses and a shop that were refaced in the 19th century. They are timber framed with brick nogging on a stone plinth, refaced in brick at the front, and with a tile roof. There are two storeys and five bays, with later extensions at the rear. In the upper floor are five sash windows. The ground floor contains three mid-19th-century former shop windows, one with a pilastered surround, and to the right is a late 19th-century shop front with a central recessed door. Between the shop windows to the left are two doorways, one with pilaster strips, a frieze and a cornice-hood, and the other with a pilastered surround.	II
15 and 17 High Street; 52.49345°N 2.99804°W	—	17th century	A pair of shops, later one shop, timber framed, refaced and rebuilt in limestone and brick, and rendered. It has a slate roof, two storeys at the front and three at the rear, and probably two bays. In the upper floor are two sash windows. The ground floor contains an early 19th-century shop front on the left that has a bow window with a frieze and a cornice, and a doorway to the left with panelled pilasters and a bracketed hood. To the right is a later 19th-century shop front with a door on the left, a passageway door on the right, and a bracketed fascia.	II
26 High Street; 52.49405°N 2.99782°W	—	17th century	A house, later a shop, it was partly rebuilt in the 19th century. It is timber framed and roughcast on a limestone plinth, the front is in stuccoed brick, and it has a slate roof, hipped to the left. There are two storeys, a semi-basement, and an attic at the rear, and two bays. In the upper floor are two windows with segmental heads, one a sash window, the other a casement. In the ground floor is a carriageway to the right, and to the left is a shop front with two plate glass windows, a recessed doorway between them, a fascia and a cornice, and to the left is a door with a fanlight.	II
27 High Street; 52.49378°N 2.99808°W	—	Mid 17th century	The house was remodelled in the 19th century. It is rendered, on a plinth, and has a slate roof. There are two storeys and attics, a T-shaped plan, and a three-bay front. In the centre is a doorway with reeded pilasters, a rectangular fanlight, and an open triangular pedimented hood on reeded brackets. The windows are sashes, and in the attic are two gabled dormers.	II
28 High Street, garage and store 52.49397°N 2.99784°W	—	Mid 17th century	A shop, stores and garage, partly timber framed, partly weatherboarded, partly encased in brick, and partly rendered, with roofs of slate and corrugated iron. There is one storey and an attic, with the gable end facing the street, and six bays along the side. Facing the street is a central doorway flanked by shop windows, and above is a casement window.	II
29 High Street; 52.49388°N 2.99808°W	—	17th century	A house, later a shop, refaced and extended to the rear in the 19th century, it is timber framed, extended in limestone, and stuccoed. It has a slate roof, two storeys, probably two bays on the front and a two-bay rear extension. In the upper floor are two sash windows, and in the ground floor is a late 19th-century shop front with a central recessed doorway.	II
37 High Street; 52.49420°N 2.99808°W	—	17th century	A house, later a shop in rendered timber framing with a slate roof. It has two storeys and two bays. In the ground floor is a late 19th-century cast iron shop front that has a recessed central door with a rectangular fanlight, and to the right is another door with a rectangular fanlight. In the upper floor are three sash windows with segmental-arched lights.	II
12 Market Square; 52.49467°N 2.99769°W	—	17th century	A house later used for other purposes, it was refaced in the 19th century. It is timber framed and roughcast, and has a slate roof. There are three storeys, the middle floor slightly jettied, and two bays. In the upper floors are sash windows. The ground floor contains a shop front, a doorway, and a bracketed hood above them.	II
14 Market Square; 52.49462°N 2.99774°W	—	17th century	A house, later a shop, it was refaced in the 19th century. The shop is timber framed and stuccoed, and has a slate roof. There are three storeys, two bays, and the windows are sashes. In the ground floor is a 19th-century shop front with a recessed central doorway flanked by two-light windows that have a pilastered surround, a fascia, and a cornice.	II
5 Salop Street; 52.49468°N 2.99682°W	—	17th century	A house, later a house and shop, it was refaced and extended in the early 19th century. It is partly timber framed and partly in limestone, and is roughcast on a plinth, and has a tile roof. There are two storeys and a semi-basement, and a two-story extension at the rear. In the right part are two cross-windows on each floor, and to the left is a shop front with small-paned window. To the right of this a doorway with an architrave, and a triangular pedimented hood on brackets, and further to the right is boarded basement door. In the extension is a casement window.	II
4 and 6 Welsh Street; 52.49471°N 2.99878°W	—	17th century	A house and former shop, altered and extended in the 19th century. they are timber framed, encased in limestone and stuccoed. The building has a slate roof, there are two storeys, two ranges, and a three-bay front. To the right is a shop window, and the other windows are sashes. There are two doorways, each with a bracketed hood.	II
8 Welsh Street; 52.49475°N 2.99890°W	—	17th century	The house was refaced in the 19th century. It is stuccoed, on a plinth, and has a slate roof. There are two storeys and an attic, and two bays. In the centre is a doorway with a hood on brackets, to the left is a former shop window, to the right is a sash window, and in the upper floor are two casement windows. At the rear are two gabled dormers.	II
23 Welsh Street; 52.49499°N 2.99978°W	—	17th century	The house was remodelled and extended in the 19th century. It is in limestone, partly rendered, on a rendered plinth with a slate roof. There are three storeys and three bays, and a two-storey single-bay extension to the right. In the centre is a gabled porch on sandstone columns, the door has a radial fanlight, and the windows are sashes.	II
Ashton House and 29–43 Welsh Street; 52.49523°N 3.00033°W	—	17th century (probable)	A row of nine cottages, much remodelled in about 1865. They are in rendered timber framing with slate roofs. Each cottage has a gabled half-dormer with decorated bargeboards and a finial, casement windows, and a doorway with pilasters, a frieze and a cornice.	II
Norton House; 52.49040°N 2.99846°W	—	17th century	The house was refaced and underbuilt in the 19th century. It is timber framed, underbuilt in limestone, faced in stucco, and has a slate roof. There are two storeys and three bays. The windows are sashes, and the central doorway has an architrave, a rectangular fanlight, and a bracketed hood.	II
The Black Lion and railings 52.49452°N 2.99869°W		17th century	A house, at one time an inn, it is in stuccoed limestone with a slate roof. There are two storeys and a basement, a T-shaped plan, and three bays, the outer bays gabled. In the centre is a porch with octagonal columns, a frieze and a cornice, and the windows are sashes. In front of the house is an enclosure with iron railings.	II
The Boar's Head Inn; 52.49135°N 2.99795°W		17th century	A house, later a public house, it was refaced in the 19th century and extended in the 20th century. It is timber framed, refaced and partly rebuilt probably in limestone, and stuccoed. The public house has a slate roof, two storeys and basement, and five bays with an outshut at the rear. On the front is a lean-to porch, some of the windows are casements, and others are sashes.	II
The Six Bells and stables 52.49009°N 2.99858°W		17th century	The public house was remodelled in the 19th century. It is timber framed, largely rebuilt in stuccoed limestone, and has a slate roof. There are two storeys and attics, an L-shaped plan, a front of three bays, an extension to the right, and former stables at the rear. The windows are casements with mullions and transoms, and in the attic are three gabled dormers. On the front is a gabled porch.	II
Werneth House and railings 52.49456°N 2.99876°W	—	17th century	The house was remodelled in the 19th century. It is roughcast, and has an L-shaped plan, with a gabled wing projecting on the right. There are two storeys, and the windows in the upper floor are sashes. The porch has octagonal columns carrying a frieze and a cornice, there is a sash window to the right, and a canted bay window in the wing. The area at the front is enclosed by cast iron railings.	II
White Gates; 52.49045°N 2.99808°W	—	Mid to late 17th century	A pair of timber framed cottages, rendered to the left, with limestone end walls and a slate roof. There is one storey and an attic, and probably four bays. No. 10 has a porch with a hipped roof, and in the right return is a canted bay window. The windows are casements with lattice glazing, those in the attic in gabled dormers with slate-hung sides.	II
12 and 14 Church Street; 52.49063°N 2.99809°W	—	Late 17th century	A pair of cottages that were remodelled in the 20th century. They are timber framed and rendered on a brick plinth and have a slate roof. There are two storeys, and probably three bays. The windows are 20th-century casements, and the doorways have bracketed gabled hoods.	II
45 Church Street; 52.49223°N 2.99793°W	—	Late 17th century (probable)	A house, later an office, it was refaced in the 19th century. The building is timber framed, faced in brick, and has a slate roof, three storeys, and one bay. The doorway has a bracketed hood, and the windows are sashes.	II
2 Welsh Street and railings 52.49466°N 2.99863°W	—	Late 17th century	A limestone house with a slate roof, it has an L-shaped plan, two storeys and an attic, a front of three bays, and a rear outshut. The central bay is narrow and rises to a dormer gable containing a casement window. The other windows are sashes. In the centre is a doorway with pilasters and a triangular pedimented hood, and in a gabled wing at the rear is a dovecote. Inside the house are timber framed partitions, and in front is an enclosure with iron railings.	II
Brewery and store 52.49445°N 2.99661°W		Late 17th century	The brewery was enlarged between 1880 and 1888. The store to the left is timber framed with brick nogging on a limestone plinth, it has two storeys, 1½ bays, and a slate roof. The tower brewery to the right is in brick with a slate roof, and has three storeys and an attic. In the gable end is a loft door with a bracketed hoist balcony. There are two windows in the top floor, three in the middle floor, and double doors in the ground floor, all with segmental heads.	II
Church Barn; 52.48942°N 2.99921°W	—	Late 17th century	The barn was later extended. It is timber framed and weatherboarded with extensions at both ends in stone, a slate roof, and a full-length brick lean-to at the rear. There are five bays, on the front facing the road are seven small-paned windows, and in the north gable end is a large 20th-century window.	II
The Malt House; 52.49537°N 3.00021°W	—	Late 17th century	The house was refaced in the 19th century. It is timber framed, roughcast, partly rebuilt in limestone, and has a slate roof. There are three storeys and two bays. In the centre is a doorway with pilasters, and an open triangular pedimented hood on brackets. The windows are sashes, and inside the house is a timber framed partition.	II
The Vicarage; 52.48924°N 2.99888°W	—	Late 17th century	The vicarage was remodelled and extended in the 19th century. It is in brick on a rendered plinth, with a band and a tile roof. There are two storeys and an attic, and seven bays. On the front is a porch with pilasters and hexagonal columns carrying a frieze and a cornice. The windows are sashes, and there are three segmental-headed dormers. At the rear is a 19th-century wing with three gabled dormers.	II
The Castle Hotel; 52.49492°N 2.99802°W		1719	The hotel was extended to the rear later in the 18th century. It is in limestone on a rendered plinth, with bands, a moulded eaves cornice, and a hipped slate roof. It has two storeys, attic and a cellar, an L-shaped plan, and a front of seven bays, the middle three bays projecting under a triangular pedimented gable. Five semicircular steps lead up to a doorway with panelled pilasters, a bracketed moulded hood, and double doors with a rectangular fanlight. Above the doorway is a large painted sign. The windows are sashes with keystones, and in the attic are two hipped dormers.	II
The Old Brick Guest House; 52.49063°N 2.99839°W	—	Early 18th century	The house was remodelled and extended in the 19th century. The original part is in red brick on a limestone plinth, and has a slate roof. There are two storeys and an attic, and three bays. The central doorway has panelled pilasters, and a flat hood on shaped brackets. The extension to the left is slightly recessed, it is roughcast on a stone plinth, and has two storeys and two bays. The windows in both parts are casements.	II
The Old Schoolhouse; 52.49497°N 2.99564°W	—	Early to mid 18th century	The house was refaced and extended in the early 19th century. It is in stuccoed limestone, and has a slate roof, hipped to the right. There are two storeys and an attic, an L-shaped plan, and three bays. The windows are sashes, and in the attic is a flat-topped dormer containing a three-light casement window. The central doorway has panelled pilasters and side-lights, and a radial fanlight.	II
Town Hall; 52.49433°N 2.99795°W		c. 1745–50	The town hall is in red brick on a sandstone plinth, with sandstone dressings and a slate roof, hipped to the south. There are two storeys and a basement. The south front has a rusticated basement, end pilaster strips, a moulded impost band, a moulded cornice, and a triangular pediment. In the ground floor is a round-arched window with a moulded architrave and a keystone, in the top floor is a Venetian window, and in the basement are two circular windows. The sides have five bays, in the ground floor are round-arched windows, and in the top floor are sash windows, all with keystones. On the roof is a wooden cupola that has a square base with clock faces, an octagonal bell stage, with Doric columns, a frieze, a cornice, and an ogee lead cap with a weathervane.	II*
62 Church Street; 52.49236°N 2.99768°W	—	18th century	A house, later a shop, it is in limestone, roughcast at the rear and sides and stuccoed at the front, and it has a slate roof. There two storeys and two bays. To the right of the doorway is an inserted plate glass shop window, and the other windows are sashes. On the right corner is a plate glass shop extension.	II
2 Union Street; 52.49172°N 2.99850°W	—	18th century	The house was refaced in the 19th century. It is timber framed with brick nogging, rendered on the front, and it has a slate roof. There are two storeys and two bays, and a one-storey lean-to at the rear. The windows are casements, and the central doorway has fluted pilasters and a bracketed hood. To the right is a limestone wall.	II
Summerhouse; 52.49172°N 2.99850°W	—	18th century	The summer house is adjacent to the site of the motte of the castle. It is in red brick with a pyramidal stone-slate roof, and has an octagonal plan and one storey. There is a doorway containing double doors, flanked by sash windows.	II
2 Market Square; 52.49488°N 2.99744°W	—	Mid to late 18th century	A house, later a shop and flats, in red brick on a limestone plinth, pebbledashed on the south, with a dentil eaves cornice, and a slate roof, hipped to the right. There are three storeys and three bays. In the ground floor on the south front are two shop fronts with pilastered surrounds flanking a central doorway. The windows are sashes, and on the east front some of the windows are blank.	II
Old Bank House; 52.49496°N 2.99764°W	—	Mid to late 18th century	A red brick house on a limestone plinth, with a hipped slate roof. It has a square plan with three storeys, three bays on each front, and a single-storey rear extension. The doorway has a pilastered surround, a rectangular fanlight, and a triangular pedimented hood on consoles, and the windows are sashes.	II
64 Church Street; 52.49247°N 2.99763°W	—	Late 18th century	The house is in stuccoed limestone with a slate roof. It has three storeys and two bays. The windows are sashes, and the central doorway has panelled pilasters, a frieze, and a bracketed cornice-hood.	II
Group of three pedestal tombs 52.48986°N 2.99883°W	—	Late 18th century	The pedestal tombs are in the churchyard of St John's Church, and are to the memory of members of the Hughes and Home families. They are in sandstone and have moulded capping and large wreathed urn finials.	II
Thomas Memorial; 52.48973°N 2.99819°W	—	Late 18th century	The memorial is in the churchyard of St John's Church, and is to the memory of William Thomas, former town clerk. It is in sandstone and consists of a pedestal tomb with a moulded plinth and cornice, and has pyramidal capping to an egg-shaped wreathed finial.	II
Toldervey tomb 52.48929°N 2.99814°W	—	Late 18th century	The tomb is in the churchyard of St John's Church, and is to the memory of Jane Toldervey. It is a pedestal tomb in sandstone, and has rebated panels, moulded capping, and a wreathed urn finial.	II
Powis Coat of Arms; 52.49489°N 2.99721°W		1781	The coat of arms of the Earl of Powis was originally in the tympanum of the market hall, and was placed on the site of the old market hall when it was demolished in 1951. It is in sandstone and consists of a round-headed blocked arch containing a carving of the coat of arms.	II
1 Bull Street; 52.49497°N 2.99739°W	—	c. 1800	A red brick house with a dentil eaves cornice and a slate roof. There are three storeys and two bays. The doorway has a pilastered surround, a radial fanlight, and an open triangular pediment on fluted brackets, and the windows are sashes.	II
16 and 18 Market Square; 52.49456°N 2.99795°W	—	c. 1800	Two houses, later two shops and flats, the building is in red brick on a plinth, with a dentil eaves cornice, and a roof partly of concrete tiles and partly of corrugated asbestos. There are three storeys and four bays, and the windows are sashes. No. 16 has an early 19th-century shop front with a small-paned bow window and a doorway to the left with pilasters, a frieze. and a moulded cornice. No. 18 has a late 19th-century shop front that has a central doorway with pilasters, a fascia, and a bracketed hood, To the right is a doorway with unfluted half-columns and a flat hood, and to the right of that is a doorway with a segmental head.	II
Wollaston tomb 52.48963°N 2.99872°W	—	c. 1800	The tomb is in the churchyard of St John's Church, and is to the memory of Thomas Wollaston. It is in sandstone, and consists of a chest tomb with shaped corner balusters, incised panels, pilasters, and chamfered corners to the capping.	II
Grave of unknown African; 52.48960°N 2.99764°W	—	1801	The grave is in the churchyard of St John's Church, and is to the memory of an unknown African man. It consists of a rectangular headstone with segmental arch, a foliate design, and an inscription.	II
17 Market Square and outbuilding 52.49443°N 2.99839°W	—	c. 1820	The house is in stuccoed limestone with a hipped slate roof, three storeys, and a basement. On the front is a central doorway with attenuated Greek Doric half-columns, a fanlight, a frieze, and a moulded cornice. There is a sash window in each floor, and a blind window to the left in both upper floors. To the right is the outbuilding in limestone with slate roofs. There are two storeys and two stepped blocks. The left block has three blind windows in the upper floor and a segmental-headed doorway in the ground floor.	II
Malt House, Harp Yard; 52.49100°N 2.99781°W	—	1822	The former brew house is in stone with a brick extension, partly rendered and with a slate roof. The main range has two storeys and an attic, and the extension has 1½ storeys. There are various openings, including casement windows.	II
Drew Memorial; 52.48925°N 2.99801°W	—	1824	The memorial is in the churchyard of St John's Church, and is to the memory of Samuel Drew. It consists of a sandstone chest tomb in Greek Revival style. There is horizontal fluting to the rounded corners and the centre and on the corners are acroteria. The tomb is enclosed on three sides by cast iron railings with spearhead finials.	II
16 and 18 Church Street; 52.49080°N 2.99808°W	—	Early 19th century	A pair of limestone houses faced with brick at the front on a projecting limestone plinth, with a slate roof, hipped to the right. There are three storeys and four bays. The windows are sashes with slightly segmental heads. The doorways have panelled pilasters, friezes, and cornices.	II
Kings Head Inn and outbuildings 52.49204°N 2.99780°W	—	Early 19th century	The public house and outbuildings at the rear are in limestone, the front is rendered, and the roof is slated. There are two storeys, an L-shaped plan, and a front of three bays. The doorway has a plain surround, and an open triangular pedimented hood on shaped brackets, and the windows are sashes with segmental heads.	II
13 and 15 Market Square; 52.49443°N 2.99820°W	—	Early to mid 19th century	A pair of houses with shop fronts, in brick with asbestos slate roofs. They have three storeys with a basement at the rear, and a front of three bays. There are two shop fronts, a doorway to the right, and one on the left in the chamfered corner. Each doorway has a flat hood on scroll brackets, and the windows are sashes.	II
3 Salop Street; 52.49471°N 2.99698°W	—	Early to mid 19th century	A stuccoed house with a slate roof, two storeys and a basement, and two bays. Steps with wrought iron railings lad up to a central doorway that has panelled pilasters, a rectangular fanlight and a cornice. To the right is a basement door, and the windows are sashes.	II
Group of three chest tombs 52.48939°N 2.99791°W	—	Early to mid 19th century	The chest tombs are in the churchyard of St John's Church, and are to the memory of various families. They are in sandstone and have varying designs.	II
Medlicott Memorial; 52.48919°N 2.99792°W	—	1836	The memorial is in the churchyard of St John's Church, and is to the memory of Thomas Medlicott. It is in sandstone, and consists of a pedestal tomb. The tomb has a central cube under a pyramidal cap that is carried on corner columns with foliage capitals.	II
Wall and gateway, St John's Church; 52.48938°N 2.99842°W	—	c. 1860	The wall and gateway incorporate items from the early 13th-century church formerly on the site. The wall is in limestone with sandstone details, and is about 22 metres (72 ft) long and 1.5 metres (4 ft 11 in) high. The re-sited doorway has a moulded pointed arch with three orders of shafts and stiff-leaf capitals. At the other end of the wall is a triple sedilia with moulded shafts and cinquefoiled arches, behind which are re-sited tombstones.	II
11 Market Square; 52.49445°N 2.99805°W	—	Mid to late 19th century	A shop in brick and stone, rendered on the front, with flanking pilasters, a dentilled parapet, and a slate roof. There are three storeys and a basement, and two bays. In the ground floor is a shop front with a central entrance, plate glass windows, pilasters, a fascia, and a cornice, and one carved decorative console on the left. The windows are sashes with moulded architraves, those in the middle floor are tripartite and have a pediment.	II
Former Malthouse; 52.49543°N 3.00033°W	—	Mid to late 19th century	The former malthouse is in limestone with some patching in red brick and a slate roof. It has an L-shaped plan, and three storeys. In the top floor are two-light windows, the middle floor contains a window and a hoist door, and in the ground floor is a window and a doorway to the right. (Note: Street View in June 2009 shows that the building has been converted for residential use.)	II
Milestone, Heblands Cottages; 52.50560°N 3.00017°W	—	Mid to late 19th century	The milestone is on the north side of the B4386 road. It is a white stone on a black base with a rounded top, and contains lettering indicating the distances in miles to "B CASTLE" (Bishop's Castle) and to "MT GOMERY" (Montgomery).	II
Milestone southwest of junction with B4386 road 52.48403°N 2.99908°W	—	Mid to late 19th century	The milestone is on the north side of the A488 road. It is a white stone on a black base with a rounded top, and contains lettering indicating the distances in miles to "B CASTLE" (Bishop's Castle), to Clun, and to Knighton.	II
The Vaults; 52.49427°N 2.99775°W	—	Mid to late 19th century	A house, later a public house, it is in limestone, stuccoed at the front, and with a slate roof. There are two storeys, a basement, an attic, and a front of three bays. In the ground floor are three flat-topped canted bay windows, and a double doorway with pilastered surrounds, fanlights, a frieze and a cornice, and in the upper floor are three sash windows.	II
Coach-house wing 52.49440°N 2.99687°W	—	1880–88	Originally a coach house between the brewery and the Three Tuns Inn, it was later used for other purposes. It is in red brick, the left part of the upper floor is timber framed with brick nogging, and there is a slate roof. There are two storeys and an attic. To the left is a spiral staircase leading to a doorway. To the right is a carriage entrance, double garage doors with a segmental head, a doorway with a segmental-headed fanlight, and in the upper floor are sash windows.	II
Telephone kiosk, High Street; 52.49333°N 2.99785°W	—	1935	A K6 type telephone kiosk, designed by Giles Gilbert Scott. Constructed in cast iron with a square plan and a dome, it has three unperforated crowns in the top panels.	II

== Notes and references ==
=== Sources ===
- Historic England, "Remains of Castle on Castle Site, Bishop's Castle (1054569)", National Heritage List for England
- Historic England, "Church of St. John The Baptist, Bishop's Castle (1367186)", National Heritage List for England
- Historic England, "Nos. 25 and 27 Church Street, Bishop's Castle (1174863)", National Heritage List for England
- Historic England, "No. 63 Church Street, Bishop's Castle (1367191)", National Heritage List for England
- Historic England, "No 25 High Street, Bishop's Castle (1295526)", National Heritage List for England
- Historic England, "No. 20 Market Square, Bishop's Castle (1054516)", National Heritage List for England
- Historic England, "Barn adjoining Hill Ridge to north-east, Bishop's Castle (1174845)", National Heritage List for England
- Historic England, "The House on Crutches and No. 41 High Street, Bishop's Castle (1367214)", National Heritage List for England
- Historic England, "The Porch House, Bishop's Castle (1367213)", National Heritage List for England
- Historic England, "No. 58 Church Street, Bishop's Castle (1295553)", National Heritage List for England
- Historic England, "Blunden Hall and Old Hall Cottage, Bishop's Castle (1054574)", National Heritage List for England
- Historic England, "Harp House, Bishop's Castle (1054583)", National Heritage List for England
- Historic England, "Three Tuns Inn, Bishop's Castle (1175152)", National Heritage List for England
- Historic England, "Nos. 50 and 52 Church Street, Bishop's Castle (1295546)", National Heritage List for England
- Historic England, "Nos. 54 and 56 Church Street, Bishop's Castle (1054584)", National Heritage List for England
- Historic England, "Nos. 19–23 High Street, Bishop's Castle (1054586)", National Heritage List for England
- Historic England, "No. 31 High Street, Bishop's Castle (1054549)", National Heritage List for England
- Historic England, "No. 39 High Street, Bishop's Castle (1054551)", National Heritage List for England
- Historic England, "The Conery, Bishop's Castle (1253331)", National Heritage List for England
- Historic England, "Nos. 38 and 40 High Street, Bishop's Castle (1054554)", National Heritage List for England
- Historic England, "No. 29 Church Street, Bishop's Castle (1054580)", National Heritage List for England
- Historic England, "No. 43 Church Street, Bishop's Castle (1174870)", National Heritage List for England
- Historic England, "No. 47 Church Street, Bishop's Castle (1174883)", National Heritage List for England
- Historic England, "Nos. 53–57 Church Street and Rudge House, Bishop's Castle (1054581)", National Heritage List for England
- Historic England, "Nos. 15 and 17 High Street, Bishop's Castle (1174938)", National Heritage List for England
- Historic England, "No. 26 High Street, Bishop's Castle (1367215)", National Heritage List for England
- Historic England, "No. 27 High Street, Bishop's Castle (1367194)", National Heritage List for England
- Historic England, "No. 28 High Street including stores and garage to rear, Bishop's Castle (1054553)", National Heritage List for England
- Historic England, "No. 29 High Street, Bishop's Castle (1174980)", National Heritage List for England
- Historic England, "No. 37 High Street, Bishop's Castle (1054550)", National Heritage List for England
- Historic England, "No. 12 Market Square, Bishop's Castle (1367218)", National Heritage List for England
- Historic England, "No. 14 Market Square, Bishop's Castle (1295447)", National Heritage List for England
- Historic England, "No. 5 Salop Street, Bishop's Castle (1054558)", National Heritage List for England
- Historic England, "Nos. 4 and 6 Welsh Street, Bishop's Castle (1054561)", National Heritage List for England
- Historic England, "No. 8 Welsh Street, Bishop's Castle (1175279)", National Heritage List for England
- Historic England, "No. 23 Welsh Street, Bishop's Castle (1175229)", National Heritage List for England
- Historic England, "Ashton Cottage, Bishop's Castle (1054560)", National Heritage List for England
- Historic England, "Norton House, Bishop's Castle (1295566)", National Heritage List for England
- Historic England, "The Black Lion and forecourt railings, Bishop's Castle (1295402)", National Heritage List for England
- Historic England, "The Boar's Head Inn, Bishop's Castle (1295544)", National Heritage List for England
- Historic England, "The Six Bells and former stables to rear, Bishop's Castle (1054579)", National Heritage List for England
- Historic England, "Werneth House and forecourt railings, Bishop's Castle (1367220)", National Heritage List for England
- Historic England, "White Gates, Bishop's Castle (1174887)", National Heritage List for England
- Historic England, "Nos. 12 and 14 Church Street, Bishop's Castle (1054582)", National Heritage List for England
- Historic England, "No. 45 Church Street, Bishop's Castle (1367190)", National Heritage List for England
- Historic England, "No. 2 Welsh Street and forecourt railings, Bishop's Castle (1295386)", National Heritage List for England
- Historic England, "Brewery and adjoining store to south-east of the Three Tuns Inn, Bishop's Castle (1175174)", National Heritage List for England
- Historic England, "Church Barn adjacent to the Old Vicarage, Bishop's Castle (1350391)", National Heritage List for England
- Historic England, "The Malt House, Bishop's Castle (1367221)", National Heritage List for England
- Historic England, "The Vicarage, Bishop's Castle (1054571)", National Heritage List for England
- Historic England, "The Castle Hotel, Bishop's Castle (1175109)", National Heritage List for England
- Historic England, "The Old Brick Guest House, Bishop's Castle (1367189)", National Heritage List for England
- Historic England, "Prospect House The Old Schoolhouse, Bishop's Castle (1054577)", National Heritage List for England
- Historic England, "The Town Hall, Bishop's Castle (1054552)", National Heritage List for England
- Historic England, "No. 62 Church Street, Bishop's Castle (1367193)", National Heritage List for England
- Historic England, "No. 2 Union Street, Bishop's Castle (1054559)", National Heritage List for England
- Historic England, "Summerhouse at SO 32335 89126, Bishop's Castle (1054570)", National Heritage List for England
- Historic England, "No. 2 Market Square, Bishop's Castle (1175102)", National Heritage List for England
- Historic England, "Old Bank House, Bishop's Castle (1054556)", National Heritage List for England
- Historic England, "No. 64 Church Street, Bishop's Castle (1054585)", National Heritage List for England
- Historic England, "Group of 3 pedestal tombs to Hughes and Home Families approximately 35 metres to north-west of Tower of Church of St. John the Baptist, Bishop's Castle (1174771)", National Heritage List for England
- Historic England, "Thomas Memorial approximately 17 metres to north of porch of Church of St. John the Baptist, Bishop's Castle (1174819)", National Heritage List for England
- Historic England, "Toldervey tomb approximately 10 metres to south of vestry of Church of St. John the Baptist, Bishop's Castle (1295606)", National Heritage List for England
- Historic England, "Powis Coat of Arms in aedicule on site of demolished Old Market Hall, Bishop's Castle (1054578)", National Heritage List for England
- Historic England, "No. 1 Bull Street, Bishop's Castle (1174835)", National Heritage List for England
- Historic England, "Nos. 16 and 18 Market Square, Bishop's Castle (1054557)", National Heritage List for England
- Historic England, "Wollaston tomb approximately 7 metres to west of tower of Church of St. John the Baptist, Bishop's Castle (1054576)", National Heritage List for England
- Historic England, "Grave of Unknown African 'I.D', North East Side of Church of St. John the Baptist, Bishop's Castle (1392346)", National Heritage List for England
- Historic England, "No. 17 Market Square and outbuilding adjoining to west, Bishop's Castle (1367217)", National Heritage List for England
- Historic England, "Malt House, Harp Yard, Bishop's Castle (1109939)", National Heritage List for England
- Historic England, "Drew Memorial and railed enclosure approximately 12 metres to south of chancel of Church of St. John the Baptist, Bishop's Castle (1367187)", National Heritage List for England
- Historic England, "Nos. 16 and 18 Church Street, Bishop's Castle (1295542)", National Heritage List for England
- Historic England, "Kings Head Inn and outbuildings to rear, Bishop's Castle (1367192)", National Heritage List for England
- Historic England, "Nos. 13 and 15 Market Square, Bishop's Castle (1054555)", National Heritage List for England
- Historic England, "No. 3 Salop Street, Bishop's Castle (1295417)", National Heritage List for England
- Historic England, "Group of 3 chest tombs approximately 3 metres to east of apse of Church of St. John the Baptist, Bishop's Castle (1367188)", National Heritage List for England
- Historic England, "Medlicott Memorial approximately 15 metres to south-east of apse of Church of St. John the Baptist, Bishop's Castle (1174784)", National Heritage List for England
- Historic England, "Wall and gateway approximately 14 metres to south of Chancel of Church of St. John the Baptist, Bishop's Castle (1054575)", National Heritage List for England
- Historic England, "11 Market Square, Bishop's Castle (1470605)", National Heritage List for England
- Historic England, "Former Malthouse adjoining No. 20 Welsh Street to west, Bishop's Castle (1175286)", National Heritage List for England
- Historic England, "Milestone approximately 260 metres to south of Heblands Cottages, Bishop's Castle (1054572)", National Heritage List for England
- Historic England, "Milestone approximately 550 metres south-west of junction of A488 with B4385, Bishop's Castle (1367184)", National Heritage List for England
- Historic England, "The Vaults, Bishop's Castle (1367216)", National Heritage List for England
- Historic England, "Coach-house wing linking Brewery to rear wing of the Three Tuns Inn, Bishop's Castle (1367219)", National Heritage List for England
- Historic England, "K6 telephone kiosk, High Street, Bishop's Castle (1054517)", National Heritage List for England
- Historic England, Listed Buildings
- Newman, John; Pevsner, Nikolaus (2006), Shropshire, The Buildings of England, New Haven and London: Yale University Press, ISBN 0-300-12083-4
