= Moor Park School =

Moor Park

Location
- Richard's Castle; Ludlow, Shropshire, SY8 4DZ; United Kingdom; 52.3385°N 2.7335°W

Information
- Type: Preparatory school Day and boarding
- Motto: Ad Deum qui laetificat juventutem meam
- Religious affiliation: Roman Catholic
- Local authority: Shropshire
- Department for Education URN: 123617 Tables
- Chairman: Andrea Minton Beddoes
- Head: James Duffield
- Gender: Coeducational
- Age: 3 months to 13 years
- Houses: Foster Inchiquin O'Brien Salwey
- Colours: Green and gold
- Publication: Crusts and Crumbs
- Website: http://www.moorpark.org.uk/

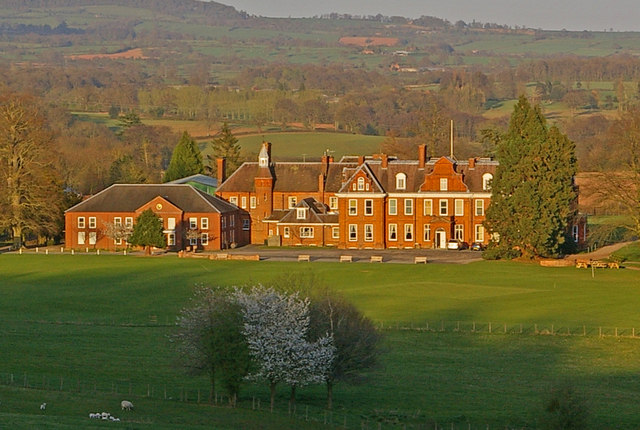

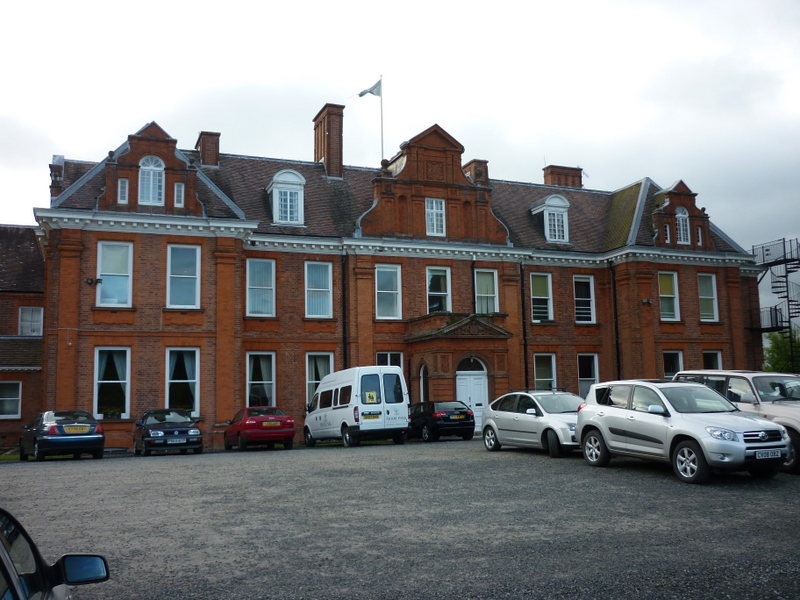

Moor Park school is a coeducational preparatory day and boarding school in the village of Richard's Castle, near Ludlow, England. It educates about 300 children and is located within the Diocese of Shrewsbury.

== History ==
The school was founded in 1964 by Hugh Watts and Derek Henderson (both former first-class cricketers). It was initially an all-boys boarding prep school modeled after the likes of Ludgrove School. Pupils often move on to other nearby public schools and independent schools such as Shrewsbury School, Malvern College, Moreton Hall School and Downside School.

=== Buildings ===
Moor Park is one of a group of country houses in the Ludlow district linked by one family, the Salweys. Haye Park, located in the Mortimer Forest, is the oldest of these buildings and was built by Richard Salwey in the mid-1600s. The Salwey family lived at Moor Park until 1870. Edward VII, then the Prince of Wales, paid the estate a visit with the intention of buying it as a country estate. He eventually settled on Sandringham House in Sandringham, Norfolk due to its proximity to the nation's capital London. Major Johnston Foster bought the estate in 1874 and proceeded to construct a new building around the Queen Anne house, incorporating the latest architectural trends of the day. His eldest daughter Ethel Jane Foster married Irish nobleman Lucius O'Brien, 15th Baron Inchiquin and they spent some time living at Moor Park, but chose to move to Ireland instead. Members of the Salwey and O'Brien families still reside in the area.

From then, Moor Park's tenants were mostly schools. During World War II, Lancing College evacuated to Moor Park from West Sussex to escape impending air raids. One notable Old Lancing from this era is novelist Tom Sharpe. His novel Blott on the Landscape was loosely based on Moor Park and the Foster family. After Lancing College returned to its original site, St Margaret's School was founded at Moor Park by Miss Nugent-Thorpe of the Parents' National Education Union (PNEU), and continued until her retirement in 1962. In 1964 the estate was bought by Hugh Watts and Derek Henderson and became the present-day school.

== Curriculum ==
Moor Park is a co-educational boarding and day school accepting children from 3 months to 13 years of age near Ludlow in Shropshire. Our children are prepared mentally, emotionally and physically to move on with confidence to the full range of schools nationally, many on scholarships in a variety of disciplines. Eton, Harrow, Radley, Shrewsbury as well as the more local schools are regular destinations. The children make full use of 85 acres of beautiful grounds and the whole school is underpinned by a culture of kindness and inclusivity founded on Catholic principles. Due to its location in the Mortimer Forest, Moor Park utilises the forest school approach and embraces its rural surroundings by incorporating outdoor learning into its curriculum.

== Former pupils ==
- Simon Halliday, former English rugby union international.
- Tim Whitmarsh, Regius Professor of Greek at the University of Cambridge.

St Margaret's

- Ann Barr, journalist and writer
