= Derek Henderson =

English cricketer and educator (1926–2019)

Personal information
- Born: 9 March 1926; Bexhill-on-Sea, Sussex, England
- Died: 13 June 2019 (aged 93)
- Batting: Right-handed
- Bowling: Right-arm medium-fast
- Relatives: Steve Henderson (son)

Domestic team information
- Years: Team
- 1949–1950: Oxford University

Career statistics
Competition	First-class
Matches	16
Runs scored	131
Batting average	10.91
100s/50s	–/–
Top score	21*
Balls bowled	2,810
Wickets	34
Bowling average	30.55
5 wickets in innings	–
10 wickets in match	–
Best bowling	4/39
Catches/stumpings	3/–
- Source: Cricinfo, 10 October 2018

Derek Henderson (9 March 1926 – 13 June 2019) was an English first-class cricketer and educator.

Henderson was born at Bexhill-on-Sea in March 1926. After attending St Edward's School, Oxford, he went up to Trinity College, Oxford. He made his debut in first-class cricket for Oxford University in 1949 against Lancashire at Fenner's. He played first-class cricket for the university until 1950, making a total of eleven appearances. Primarily a medium-fast bowler, Henderson took 30 wickets for the university at an average of 25.90, with best figures of 4/39. While at Oxford, he won a Blue in cricket. He also made four appearances in first-class cricket for the Free Foresters from 1951–1954, with all four matches coming against Oxford University.

After graduating from Trinity College, Henderson began a career in teaching. He and Hugh Watts purchased the Moor Park Estate in Shropshire in 1964, where they founded the Moor Park School. Henderson was its headmaster until he retired in 1988. He lived near Oxford after he retired. His son, Steve Henderson, also played first-class cricket.
