= Hugh Watts =

English cricketer

Personal information
- Full name: Hugh Edmund Watts
- Born: 4 March 1922; Stratton-on-the-Fosse, Somerset, England
- Died: 21 December 1993 (aged 71); Trebetherick, Cornwall, England
- Nickname: The Abbot
- Batting: Left-handed
- Bowling: Leg-break
- Role: Batsman

Domestic team information
- Years: Team
- 1939–1952: Somerset
- 1947: Cambridge University
- FC debut: 19 August 1939 Somerset v Hampshire
- Last FC: 29 August 1952 Somerset v Leicestershire

Career statistics
Competition	First-class
Matches	72
Runs scored	2,958
Batting average	25.50
100s/50s	1/19
Top score	110
Balls bowled	126
Wickets	1
Bowling average	117.00
5 wickets in innings	0
10 wickets in match	0
Best bowling	1/15
Catches/stumpings	24/–
- Source: CricketArchive, 12 January 2010

Hugh Edmund Watts (4 March 1922 – 27 December 1993) was an English cricketer who played first-class cricket for Somerset as an amateur player before and after the Second World War. He also played for Cambridge University in 1947, winning a blue by playing in the annual Varsity cricket match against Oxford. In his working life, he was a schoolmaster, and most of his first-class cricket was played in school holiday times.

== Cricket career ==
Educated at Downside School where he was later a teacher, the bespectacled Watts was a successful schoolboy cricketer as a left-handed middle-order batsman and a leg-break bowler. He appeared in the public schools cricket festival at Lord's in August 1939, where he top-scored for "The Rest" in the match against the "Lord's Schools", and then featured in the combined schools side to play the Army. From Lord's he went straight into the Somerset side for the final four matches of the 1939 County Championship season, batting in the lower order and making 76 runs in six innings.

Watts went to Cambridge University in 1940 and appeared in the 1941 wartime Varsity cricket match against Oxford. In September 1942, he was commissioned into the Rifle Brigade as a second lieutenant. He was promoted to lieutenant in November 1945 and finally resigned his commission in March 1947 with the honorary rank of major.

Watts' resumption of a first-class cricket career pre-dated his discharge from the army: he played in nine games for Somerset in the 1946 season, and made his first first-class 50 in the game against Nottinghamshire at Trent Bridge. In 1947, Watts played virtually a full season of first-class cricket, with 11 matches for Cambridge University followed by 12 for Somerset. In all, he made 990 runs at an average of 26.75, with 10 scores of more than 50. The highest of these, though, was just 74, made in the game against the Free Foresters. In the Varsity Match, Watts top-scored with 65 in Cambridge's first innings, though he scored only 1 when Cambridge saved the match after being forced to follow on.

For the five seasons from 1948 to 1952, Watts' cricket was confined to school holidays, with only one match, in June 1948, outside the long summer holiday period; only in 1950 did he fail to make useful runs. He captained the side in some matches including at least one match in the summer of 1948, when Somerset had three official captains (not including Watts). In 1949 his arrival, along with that of fellow-schoolmaster Micky Walford, was credited by Wisden as responsible for transforming Somerset's fortunes after 10 consecutive County Championship defeats: the pair "arrived like giants deposing weaklings", it wrote. In these 1949 matches, Watts made the only first-class century of his career, scoring 110 against Glamorgan in the match at Weston-super-Mare.

Aside from his teaching career, Watts' cricket was also restricted by war wounds, which meant he bowled very infrequently, and he did not play at all after 1952. In his penultimate first-class match, he made 93, his second highest score, against Nottinghamshire at Trent Bridge.

== After cricket ==
Watts taught history and cricket at Downside until in 1963 when he founded the Moor Park preparatory school near Ludlow in Shropshire with Derek Henderson. He retired from there to Cornwall where he was secretary and captain of the St Enodoc Golf Club.
