= St Bartholomew's Church, Richard's Castle =

Coordinates: 52.3282°N 2.7581°W

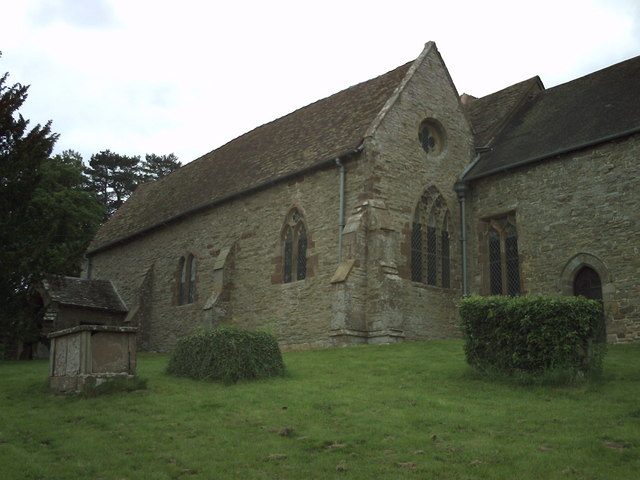
- St Bartholomew's Church, Richard's Castle, from the southeast

- Location in Herefordshire
- OS grid reference: SO 48433 70280
- Location: Richard's Castle, Herefordshire
- Country: England
- Denomination: Anglican
- Website: Churches Conservation Trust

History
- Dedication: Saint Bartholomew

Architecture
- Functional status: Redundant
- Heritage designation: Grade I
- Designated: 11 June 1959
- Architectural type: Church
- Style: Norman, Gothic
- Groundbreaking: 12th century
- Completed: 15th century

Specifications
- Materials: Stone, tile roofs

St Bartholomew's Church is a redundant Anglican church in the village of Richard's Castle, Herefordshire, England. It is recorded in the National Heritage List for England as a designated Grade I listed building, and is under the care of the Churches Conservation Trust. It stands close to the castle of the same name as the village, which was built to command this part of the Welsh Marches. The village is partly in Shropshire and the county boundary is not far from the church.

Notably, the tower is detached from the main body of the church, and stands about 11 yards (10 m) to its east.

== History ==
The church dates from the 12th century. It was extended early in the 14th century, and again in the early 15th century, and restored in the late 19th century. The church was declared redundant on 1 August 1982, and was vested in the Churches Conservation Trust on 30 March 2001. The village continues to be served by the Church of England with the All Saints church at Batchcott, Shropshire.

== Architecture ==
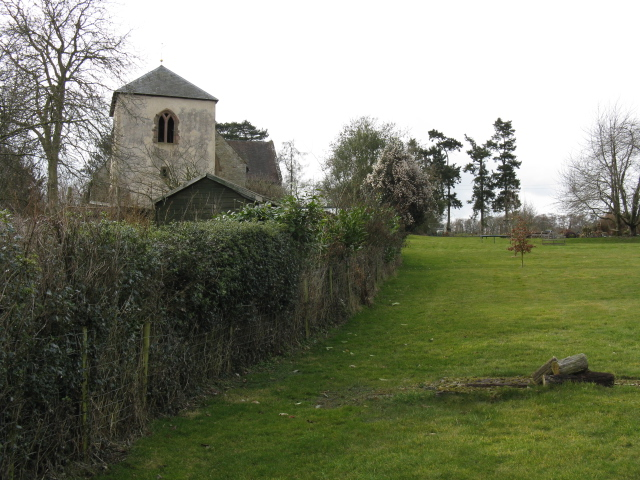
The exterior and surroundings

=== Exterior ===
St Bartholomew's is constructed in stone rubble with tile roofs. Its plan consists of a nave and chancel built in the 12th century, a south aisle and a north chapel built in the 14th century, and a south porch of the 15th century. The south aisle is in three bays between which are stepped buttresses. The middle bay contains a pair of lancet windows. In the easternmost of the bays has a two-light window, and in the western bay is the south doorway. The porch is arched, and in each side of it are two-light windows. The west window of the aisle consists of two lancets, and at the east end is a three-light window. The west window of the nave has four lights. On the north wall are two buttresses, and it contains two 12th-century round-headed windows, one of which is partly obscured by a buttress. The chapel has a four-light north window, and three-light windows on the east and west sides. The south wall of the chancel is in three bays. It contains a priest's door, with a two-light window on each side. The east window has four lights, and below it are a two-light mullioned window and the head of a doorway leading to a vault. The churchyard contains the war grave of a soldier of the Army Service Corps of World War I.

=== Interior ===
Inside the church, the south arcade has three bays and the arcade between the chancel and the chapel has two bays. In the south wall of the aisle is a piscina, and against its west wall is a 13th-century coffin lid inscribed with a foliated cross. Under the north window of the chapel is a tomb recess. In the nave and aisle are box pews from the 17th century. Elsewhere in the church are benches, and there is an 18th-century family pew in the chapel under a canopy. There are fragments of 14th-century glass in many of the windows. In the chancel are six hatchments on the walls, and 18th-century memorial slabs on the floor. In the south west end there is a font which appears to be from the Herefordshire Romanesque Sculpture school apparently representing four horned rams The font is very worn and seems to have been outside for a considerable time p

== Tower ==
To the east of the church is a detached tower dating from the 14th century. Some restoration was carried out on it during the 19th century. It has a square plan and is surmounted by a slate pyramidal roof with a weathervane. The tower is in three stages. In the lowest stage is an arched entrance on the west side. There are square-headed windows in the east and south sides in both the lowest and the middle stages. The upper stage contains two-light arched bell openings on the north, south and east sides. The tower has been designated separately as a Grade I listed building.

== See also ==
- List of churches preserved by the Churches Conservation Trust in the English Midlands
