= Steve Henderson (cricketer) =

English cricketer

Stephen Henderson
Personal information
- Full name: Stephen Peter Henderson
- Born: 24 September 1958 (age 68); Headington, Oxfordshire, England
- Nickname: Hendo
- Batting: Left-handed
- Bowling: Right-arm medium
- Relatives: Derek Henderson (father)

Domestic team information
- Years: Team
- 1977–1981: Worcestershire
- 1982–1983: Cambridge University
- 1983–1985: Glamorgan

Career statistics
Competition	FC	LA
Matches	71	62
Runs scored	2,628	829
Batting average	26.01	18.02
100s/50s	4/12	0/4
Top score	209*	82
Balls bowled	268	82
Wickets	3	4
Bowling average	72.00	21.50
5 wickets in innings	0	0
10 wickets in match	0	N/A
Best bowling	2–48	2–16
Catches/stumpings	47/0	15/0
- Source: CricketArchive, 12 October 2008

Stephen Peter Henderson (born 24 September 1958) is a former English first-class cricketer who played for several teams in the late 1970s and 1980s, mostly for Worcestershire, Cambridge University and Glamorgan.

== Life and career ==
Henderson attended Downside School before studying at Cambridge and Durham University, and began his cricketing career at Worcestershire, making his first-class debut in a County Championship match versus Glamorgan in July 1977. His only half-century was 52 against Northamptonshire.

Henderson graduated from Durham with a BA in General Studies in 1980. He remained at Worcestershire until 1981, playing a handful of games each summer as he juggled his cricketing appearances with his studies at Durham. He made few scores of note at New Road, indeed making only one further half-century: 64 against Lancashire at Stourport-on-Severn in July 1980, in the only first-class game ever played on the Chain Wire Club Ground.

In 1982 Henderson went to Magdalene College, Cambridge, as a postgraduate student, and in 1982 and 1983 he made a number of appearances for the university team; he won his Blue and in 1983 captained the side on numerous occasions. In late April 1982 he scored his only double century, hitting an unbeaten 209 against Middlesex at Fenner's in a game the university nevertheless lost by eight wickets.

Also in 1982, while playing at club level for Rochdale, he appeared for Shropshire in five matches for the county, totalling 256 runs.

After leaving Cambridge, Henderson returned to county cricket, this time with Glamorgan. Between mid-1983 and the end of 1985 he made 27 first-class and 27 List A appearances for the Welsh county, and was considered in some quarters to have the makings of a captain. However, he never actually captained the side in a first-team game (though he did do so a couple of times at Second XI level). Despite several big innings, notably 135* against Warwickshire in September 1983, he never quite became a regular in the side, and retired from first-class cricket after the 1985 season.

Henderson did not leave cricket altogether, however. He played one final first-class game in September 1987, turning out for Marylebone Cricket Club (MCC) against Yorkshire at the Scarborough Festival, and played a number of minor games for both MCC and Hertfordshire in the late 1980s and early 1990s, as well as playing List A cricket in the one-day trophies for both Hertfordshire and Minor Counties. He also played regularly for Sir JP Getty's XI in the 1990s, and toured Namibia with MCC as late as 2001.

After finishing his first-class cricket career Henderson went to work in the City of London.

His father Derek Henderson played for Oxford University and Free Foresters between 1949 and 1954.
