= Bishop's Castle =

Town in Shropshire, England

Coordinates: 52.493°N 2.9978°W

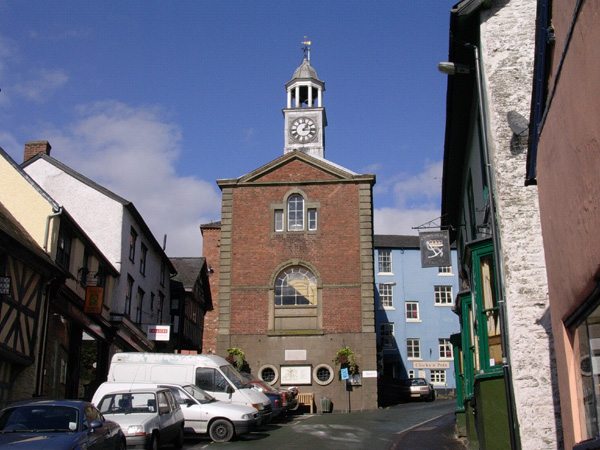
- Bishop's Castle Town Hall

- Location within Shropshire
- Population: 1,893
- OS grid reference: SO323887
- Civil parish: Bishop's Castle
- Unitary authority: Shropshire
- Ceremonial county: Shropshire
- Region: West Midlands
- Country: England
- Sovereign state: United Kingdom
- Post town: BISHOPS CASTLE
- Postcode district: SY9
- Dialling code: 01588
- Police: West Mercia
- Fire: Shropshire
- Ambulance: West Midlands
- UK Parliament: South Shropshire

Bishop's Castle is a market town in the south west of Shropshire, England. According to the 2011 Census it had a population of 1,893.

Bishop's Castle is 1.5 miles (2.4 km) east of the Wales–England border, about 20 miles (30 km) north-west of Ludlow and about 20 miles (30 km) south-west of Shrewsbury. To the south is Clun and to the east is Church Stretton. The town is within an agricultural area and has also become known for its alternative community including artists, musicians, writers and craftspeople. The surrounding area is hillwalking country and Bishop's Castle is a "Walkers are Welcome Town", gaining the award in 2008. The long distance footpath the Shropshire Way runs through the town and Offa's Dyke is only a few miles to the west.

The ancient trackway of the Kerry Ridgeway, a prehistoric Bronze Age route, runs from the town. The BC Ring, a 60-mile (100 km) challenging route around the town, was published in 2008. The town has two micro-breweries, including the Three Tuns, the UK's oldest brewery.

== History ==
=== The castle ===
Documented history begins in Saxon times for Bishop's Castle when Edwin Shakehead, grateful for being miraculously cured of the palsy at Saint Ethelbert's tomb in Hereford Cathedral gave part of his lands to the incumbent Bishop of Hereford. A later Bishop of Hereford built a castle, originally a motte and bailey design, in 1087 to defend the church and village from the threat of the Welsh (its site grid reference SO323891). The castle has been under attack several times, not always by Welsh raiders, most notably in 1263 when John Fitzalan, Lord of Arundel and feudal Lord of Oswestry and Clun, held it under siege in the course of a feud with the Bishop of Hereford and caused significant damage, estimated at 1,060 marks.

In the Early Middle Ages the castle and parish were situated partly in Wales and partly in England so territorial disputes literally 'came with the territory'.

In 1557 the castle was described as follows: "thirteen rooms covered with lead, a tower on the outer wall on the eastern side containing a stable, and two rooms covered with tiles. There were two other rooms called 'le new buyldinge' situated on the outer wall between the building over the gate and the tower called 'le prison tower'. There was also a dovecote, a garden, a forest and a park."

As peace came to the Welsh Marches Bishop's Castle became one of the notorious rotten boroughs, an electorally corrupt situation wherein the tiny borough elected two members of parliament from 1585.

In 1618 the castle started to deteriorate and in the 1700s the stone keep and surroundings were flattened to make a bowling green. (Some historians believe that the houses along Market Square and Castle Street were built upon the foundations of an outer wall due to the curvature of the houses).

In 1642, the Three Tuns Brewery was established on its current site, making it the oldest licensed brewery site in Britain. While some of the current building dates to the seventeenth century, the main building is a Victorian tower brewery erected about 1888.

In 1719 – the fifth year of the reign of George I and the year Daniel Defoe published Robinson Crusoe – the Castle Hotel was constructed over the site of the old baille [the French word for an enclosed court] of the ancient castle. It was built on the orders of a local landowner, James Brydges (1673–1744), who in the year the hotel was completed was created Duke of Chandos. In an age of unabashed corruption, he acquired a number of lucrative sinecure offices and amassed such wealth that he was known as 'Princely Chandos'.

The 1st Duke of Chandos sold the Castle Hotel to John Walcot who in turn sold it to Robert Clive, 1st Baron Clive of Plassey (1725–1774), known as 'Clive of India', who amassed such wealth during his time in that country that Horace Walpole writing from London to a country friend said: 'you will be frightened by the dearness of everything ... I expect that a pint of milk will soon not be sold under a diamond, and then nobody can keep a cow but my Lord Clive'. From Lord Clive the hotel descended to his son, Edward, and then to his grandson, who changed the family name to Herbert, his mother's maiden name. The older Edward became Earl of Powis on the death of his brother-in-law, George Herbert, 2nd Earl of Powis (of the previous creation of that title).

Local landowners, including Lord Clive, expended large sums of cash buying votes, a common practice at the time in some areas to ensure a seat in Parliament. In 1726 one unsuccessful parliamentary candidate was subsequently able to prove that of the 52 people voting for his rival, the incumbent MP, 51 had received bribes and inducements. The Reform Act 1832 eradicated this practice and Bishop's Castle was disenfranchised.

All that is physically left of the castle today is a 10 metres (30 feet) long, coursed stone wall on the west side of the castle site which is 2 metres (6 feet) thick and 3 metres (10 feet) high. It was overgrown with ivy and was recently renovated to keep it safe and stable. The Castle Hotel stands on the site of the castle itself and is largely built of stone salvaged from the original castle.

=== The town ===
The layout of the town in the present day shows that originally the town was made up of 46 burgage plots which were separated by a few small lanes which have developed to be Church Street, Union Street and Station Street.

In 1249 a royal charter for a weekly market and an annual fair was granted. They are both still very popular.

In the 17th century, Bishop's Castle Town Hall was constructed as a new administrative centre, a court and a prison. It was refurbished with support from the Heritage Lottery Fund and was re-opened in June 2014.

The town was classified as a municipal borough in 1885. It lost this status in the 1960s, but still has a mayor and its regalia. It is now a "Quality Town Council".

Bishop's Castle was close to the epicentre of a magnitude 5.1 earthquake on 2 April 1990, which was felt throughout much of England and Wales.

The town is located close to the Shropshire Hills Area of Outstanding Natural Beauty.

== Governance ==
From 1584 to 1832 it was its own parliamentary borough with two MPs. It was part of the Ludlow constituency from 1885 until its redesignation as South Shropshire in 2024 following constituency boundary changes.

Today the town forms a civil parish, with its own town council and mayor. The original Town Council website was one of the first in the UK to publish agendas and minutes (from late 2000).

An electoral ward of the same name exists in the Shropshire Council. This ward stretches north east to Ratlinghope and at the 2011 Census had a total population of 3,728.

== Amenities ==
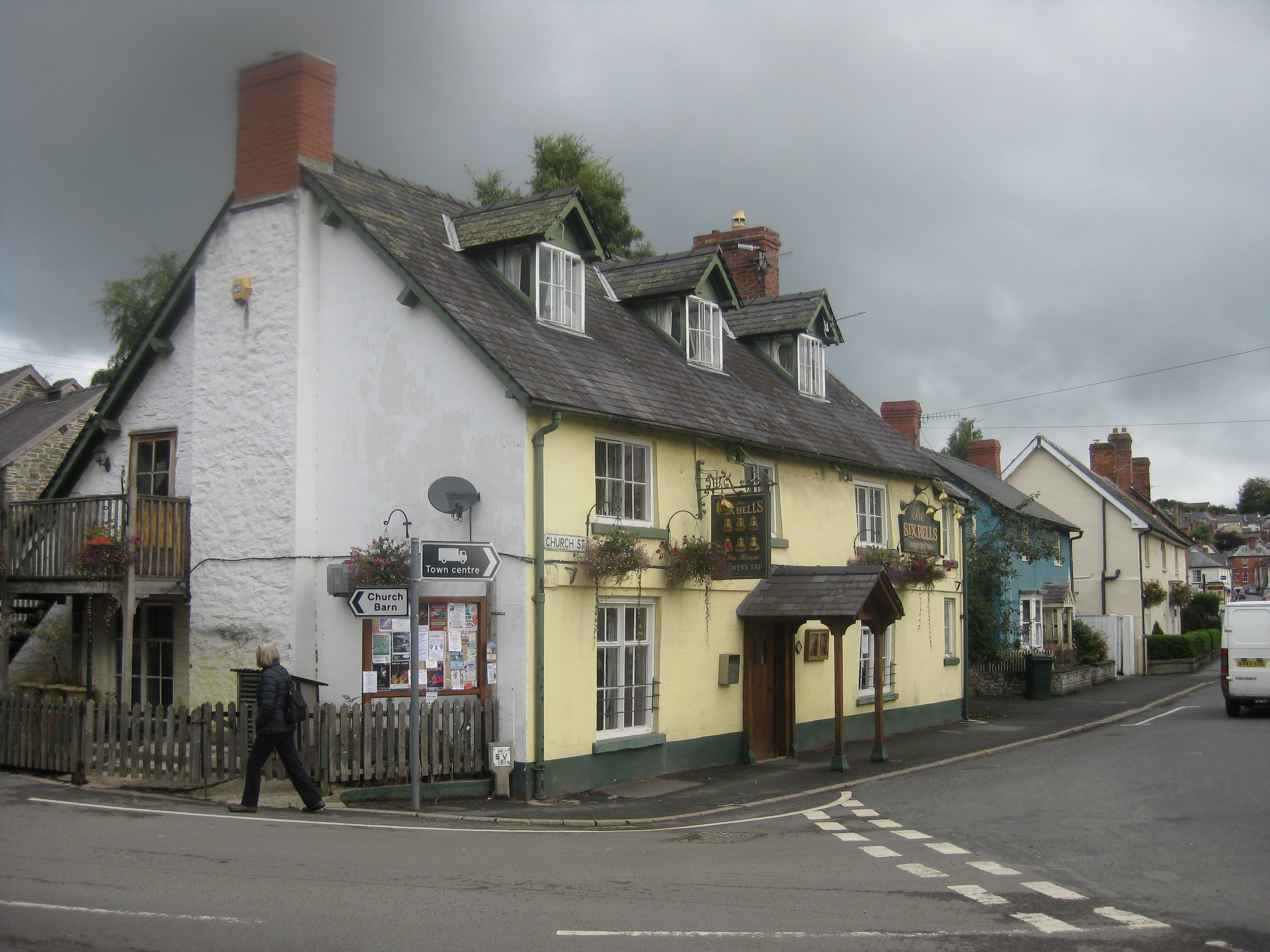
Six Bells pub and brewery

There are a variety of shops, local businesses and services ranging from clothes shops to the usual high street banks. The town is notable for a thriving selection of specialist retailers.

There are several public houses in the town, and one micro-brewery: the Three Tuns Brewery. Additionally, the town sports a number of restaurants and bed and breakfasts, and a hotel, The Castle Hotel, built on the site of the outer bailey of the old bishop's castle. Other sights in the town include the House on Crutches Museum of country life, the Rail & Transport Museum, and the old cattle market in the centre of town.

Many properties are painted in various colourful hues of blue, pink, yellow and green which are reflected on the Wintles, a new neighbourhood of energy efficient eco-houses built by Living Villages.

== Education ==
The town possesses a high school (Bishop's Castle Community College) which teaches 11- to 16-year-olds, around 450 students from the town and surrounding villages and towns. It also has a primary school and a Nursery.

== Media ==
Local news and television programmes are provided by BBC West Midlands and ITV Central. Television signals are received from the local relay transmitter.

Local radio stations are BBC Radio Shropshire, Hits Radio Black Country & Shropshire, Greatest Hits Radio Black Country & Shropshire and Capital North West and Wales.

The town is served by the local newspapers, Ludlow Advertiser, County Times, and Shropshire Star.

== Sport ==
Sports played by local clubs include:

=== Cricket ===
Bishop Castle Cricket Club's 1st XI play in Division 2 of the Shropshire Cricket League, and the club play friendlies on Sundays, with regular youth coaching sessions (usually Monday evenings) and matches for school age children. Cricket was first recorded being played in 1841 on Love Lane, and the club was officially formed in 1896 at a meeting held in the Six Bells public house, and have played at the Manor Ground since 1946. The 1st XI equalled their highest ever finish of 4th in 2011 (previously achieved in 2009) with a record points total of 332. The club's social base is the Castle Hotel off Market Square.

=== Football ===
Bishops Castle Town play in the Montgomeryshire Amateur League and were Division 1 Champions in 2017–18, having previously played for 6 years in the Mercian Regional Football League Division One. Previously they played in Division 1 of the Montgomeryshire Amateur League, having gained promotion from Division 2 in the early 1990s, and having joined Division 2 in 1984–85. Before that they played in various leagues including the South Shropshire League and the West Shropshire Alliance. The club was formed in the 1880s. The club's social base after matches and for meetings is The Kings Head Public House in Church Street. The club play their Home matches at the Community College ground on Colebatch Road.

=== Rugby ===
Bishop's Castle and Onny Valley Rugby Club was formed in the late 1970s and spent the early years playing friendly games against teams from Mid-Wales and Shropshire, before joining the league structure in the early 1990s. Now they play in Midlands Division Fourth North.

=== Other sports ===
- Women's Hockey
- Squash
- Tennis

== Transport ==
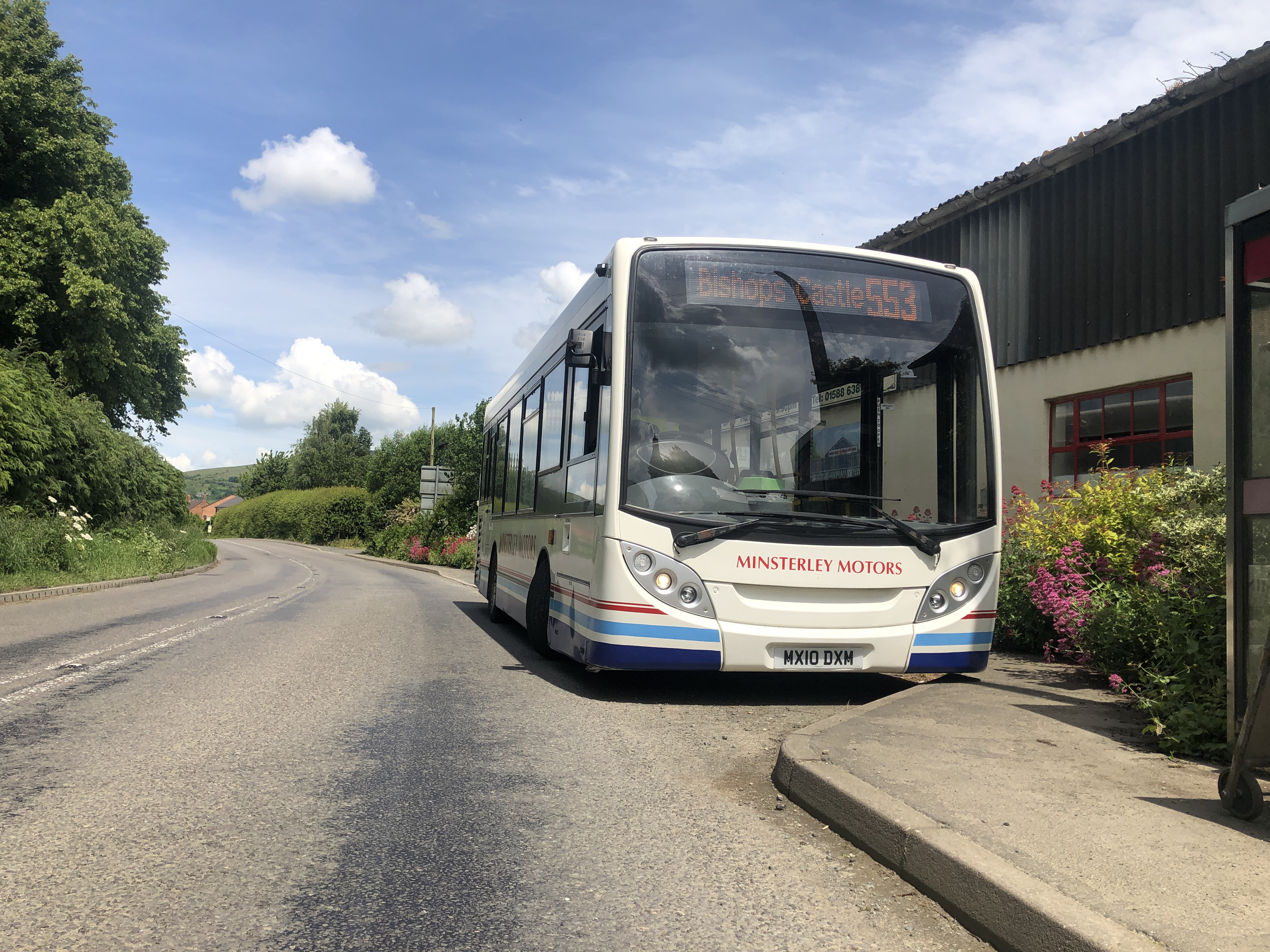
Minsterley Motors E200 at Lydham, en route to Bishop's Castle on route 553

Bishop's Castle has been on a main route for travellers since prehistoric times, although the town was bypassed in the 19th century by Thomas Telford's great road. The inns would have provided accommodation for travellers and have stabled their horses.

There is no main road running through the town, though the A488 runs north–south just to the east of the town, on its way from Shrewsbury, Pontesbury and Minsterley to Clun and Knighton. The B4385 runs around the town and connects with the A488.

Bishop's Castle had a railway, the Bishops Castle Railway, between 1865 and 1935. Originally it was meant to go from Craven Arms to Montgomery, but that speculation failed due to lack of finance. Sections of the old railway can still be seen today, including some of the embankments, bridges and stations. Today the nearest station is Broome on the Heart of Wales Line.

There is a limited daytime bus service 553 on Mondays to Saturdays between Bishop's Castle and Shrewsbury, operated by local independent operator Minsterley Motors.

== Notable people ==
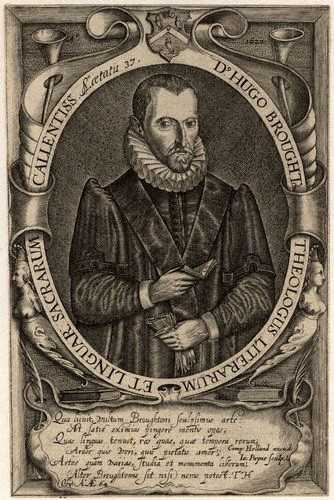
Hugh Broughton, 1620

- Oliver Mathews (c. 1520–c. 1618), Welsh apothecary and chronicler; married in Bishop's Castle, lived at Snead.
- Richard Broughton (1542–1604), English judge and politician, of family owning Owlbury and Lower Broughton in town's parish
- Hugh Broughton (1549 at Owlbury, Bishop's Castle – 1612), English Hebrew scholar and theologian.
- Matthew Decker (1679 – 1749) a Dutch-born English merchant and economist who served as MP for Bishop's Castle 1719 /1722.
- Richard Gifford (1725 in Bishop's Castle – 1807), English poet and clergyman.
- Robin Legge (1862 in Bishop's Castle – 1933), chief music critic of The Daily Telegraph, 1906–1931
- Sir Albert Howard (1873 in Bishop's Castle – 1947), an English botanist, an organic farming pioneer and a principal figure in the early organic movement
- Peter Postlethwaite (1946–2011) character actor, lived near Bishop's Castle in the final years of his life.
- John Kirkpatrick (born 1947) folk musician, moved locally in 1973
- Fuzz Townshend (born 1964), drummer, TV presenter, motoring journalist and mechanic; lives locally.
- Matthew Green (born 1970), Liberal Democrat politician, lived in Bishop's Castle prior to his election as MP for Ludlow.

=== Sport ===
- Richard More (1879 in Bishop's Castle – 1936), an English cricketer, played first-class cricket for Oxford University and Middlesex.
- James Sharples (1890 – 1969 in Bishop's Castle), an English cricketer who played for Glamorgan.
- Oliver Morgan (2003 in Bishop's Castle), English swimmer who competed at 2024 Summer Olympics.

== See also ==
- Listed buildings in Bishop's Castle
