= Three Tuns Brewery =

Brewery in Bishop's Castle, Shropshire, England

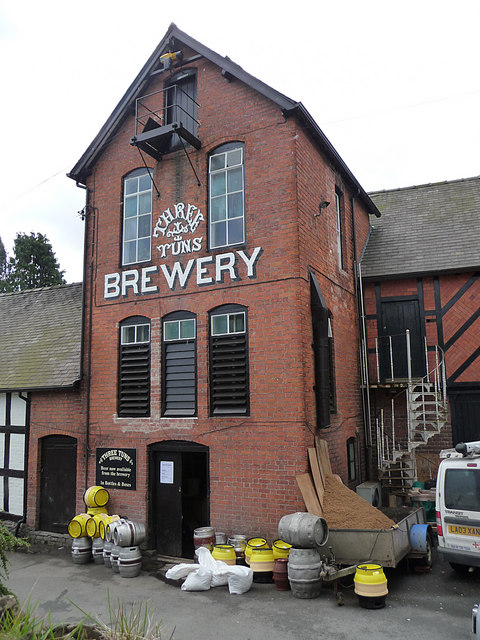
- Industry: Brewing
- Founded: 1642
- Headquarters: Bishop's Castle, England
- Owner: John Roberts' Brewing Co.
- Website: threetunsbrewery.co.uk

The Three Tuns Brewery in Bishop's Castle, Shropshire, England was established in 1642 on its current site, making it the oldest licensed brewery site in Britain. While some of the current building dates to the seventeenth century, the main building is a Victorian tower brewery erected about 1888, making it one of only four brewers in the United Kingdom to use such a method to brew beer.

The brewery is Grade Two listed, described as "a rare survival of a small, working rural brewery".

In January 2003, the brewery was sold to the John Roberts' Brewing Co. Ltd. Owners John Russell and Bill Bainbridge refitted the brewery with modern brewing equipment whilst 150 tonnes of steel was used to uphold the structure of the tower, required because of a 20 fold increase in loadings following the brewery development project.

There were new plans in 2012 to further develop the brewery to a capacity of 160 brewers barrels per week, which would involve excavating into the brewery foundations as The Three Tuns will never brew outside of its 17th century and Victorian buildings. During 2013 the brewery was expanded to make room to facilitate more fermenting vessels, having operated at its brewing capacity of 90 brewers barrels for several years.

In 2017, Lonely Planet described The Three Tuns Brewery as one of the best beer locations to visit across the world.

As of July 2018, the brewery has six regular ales and four seasonal beers. Emphasis is placed upon pale ale, with Maris Otter Malts being used frequently to achieve the pale-straw, light-tan and golden colours brewed.
