= James Sharples (blacksmith) =

English painter

James Sharples (4 September 1825 – 13 June 1893) was an English blacksmith and self-taught artist and engraver. He is best known for his work The Forge, which he painted and then engraved in his spare time.

Sharples was born in Wakefield, West Riding of Yorkshire, into a large family of thirteen. His father was a blacksmith, as were both of his grandfathers. Sharples had little formal education and began to work as a smithy-boy in an iron foundry aged ten, later moving to work as a riveter in the engine shop where his father worked.

He discovered his artistic bent by helping the foreman to draw the designs for boilers on the workshop floor, and practised by copying lithographs and engravings in his spare time. Aged 16, he attended a drawing class at Bury Mechanics' Institution each week for three months. He learnt technique from John Burnet's Practical Treatise on Painting, asking his family to help him to read it, and then John Flaxman's Anatomical Principles and Brook Taylor's Principles of Perspective. He made his own easel and palette to attempt oil painting, walking the 18-mile round trip to Manchester to buy paint. He sold his first successful painting, a copy of an engraving entitled Sheep-shearing, for half a crown (12½p).

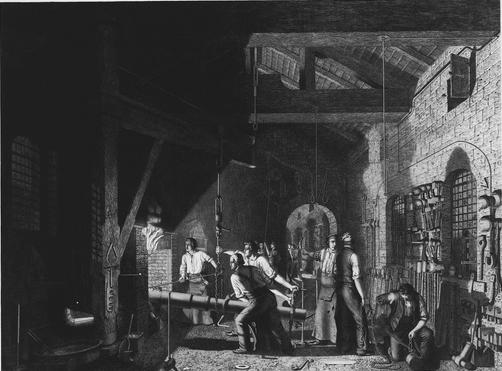
The Forge, engraving, 1859. British Museum

After completing a few other works, he began his masterwork, The Forge, a lively depiction of the Industrial Revolution in progress that showed the interior of a large workshop at an iron foundry. He completed the work after about three years, sometime around 1849. Encouraged by its reception, Sharples gave up his day job to paint full-time, taking commissions to paint portraits, but found it difficult to make a living as an artist and returned to ironworking. Sharples took up a suggestion from a picture dealer in Manchester to have The Forge engraved, but was determined to teach himself the process and produce a steel engraving himself. After working in his spare time for about five years, often kept company in the evening by his wife's reading, he completed the task in 1859. Both the engraving and a mezzotint version became popular and sold well, but made Sharples little money. He painted one other large work, The Smithy, and was awarded a prize by the Amalgamated Society of Engineers for creating an emblematic design. His "perseverance and industry", and determination to improve himself, were given as an example by Samuel Smiles in his 1859 book Self-Help, and a biography was published by local journalist Joseph Baron in 1893.

His works are perhaps unique examples of fine art produced by a working man in the mid-19th century, at a time when other artists were creating their impressions of labour, such as Ford Madox Brown's painting Work.

He married Sarah Moore on 7 April 1852. After her death in 1861, he married Sarah Ford on 20 June 1863. He had one son and one daughter with each of his wives. He died in Blackburn, Lancashire on 13 June 1893 aged 67.

== Bibliography ==
- L. H. Cust, ‘Sharples, James (1825–1893)’, rev. Mark Pottle, Oxford Dictionary of National Biography, Oxford University Press, 2004. Accessed 28 Feb 2010]
- James Sharples, The Forge, a steel engraving, British Museum
- F.D. Klingender. Art and the Industrial Revolution London and New York, 1968
- Müller[-Straten], Christian: James Sharples und das Zertifikat der Amalgamated Society of Engineers: Studien zur Bildkultur britischer Gewerkschaften / Selbstverlag 1978. München, Univ., Philos. Fak., Diss., 1977 [Biography, historical context, Sharples as union member, painter and engraver, cataloque raisonnée]
