= Richard Gifford =

English poet and clergyman (1725–1807)

Richard Gifford (1725–1807), was an English poet and Church of England clergyman.

== Life and career ==
He was born at Bishop's Castle, Shropshire. He was educated at Oxford University where he gained his degree in theology in 1748. Ordained in holy orders in the Church of England, he was appointed curate at Richard's Castle, Herefordshire and was later a preacher in Soho, London.

== Literary works ==
He was the author of a poem, Contemplation. He also wrote theological and controversial works.
