= James Sharples (cricketer) =

English cricketer (1890–1969)

James Sharples (26 December 1890 – 23 March 1969) was an English cricketer who played for Glamorgan. He was born in Pendlebury, Lancashire and died in Bishop's Castle, Shropshire.

Sharples played cricket first in Lancashire, then when he moved to South Wales, for Briton Ferry Town. He made a single first-class appearance for Glamorgan during the 1922 season. He scored a duck in the only innings in which he batted, and conceded a single run from an over's worth of bowling.
