= Adam Sharples =

British executive, and former civil servant and economist

Adam John Sharples, CB, FRSA (born 1954) is a British executive, and former civil servant and economist.

== Early life and education ==
Born in 1954, Sharples attended Corpus Christi College, Oxford, in the early 1970s; there he formed a rock band with Mark Ellen, with whom he had attended Winchester College, called Ugly Rumours; following auditions in late 1974, they invited Tony Blair to be their singer but the group disbanded after three performances. Sharples graduated from Oxford in 1975 and completed a master's degree in economics at Queen Mary College, University of London, in 1977.

== Career ==
=== The Labour Party and NUPE ===
In 1978, Sharples began working for the Labour Party as an economist and became a main author of its Alternative Economic Strategy. In 1983, he left the party and spent five years as Head of Research at the National Union of Public Employees (NUPE). In 1987, he and Tom Sawyer (chairman of the Labour Party's Home Policy Committee and Deputy General-Secretary of NUPE) proposed a "comprehensive policy review" for Labour "to bring discipline to a party drifting dangerously after its third electoral defeat", in the words of The Guardian. The review was published in 1989.

=== Civil service ===
Sharples entered HM Civil Service in 1988 as a principal in HM Treasury. His departure from NUPE drew comment from The Times, which used him as an example of the "haemorrhage of talent from the unions of the boys and girls who would, in other circumstances, have grown up into the Norman Willises and Clive Jenkinses of the early 21st century. What's galling isn't just that they're going, but that they are going to the very places doing the unions down".

Sharples was promoted at the Treasury, eventually serving as Director of Public Spending from 1998 to 2003. He spent a year at the Board of Inland Revenue as Director for International and then joined the Department for Work and Pensions in 2004 as Director-General of the Work, Welfare and the Equality Group; in 2009, this position was abolished and he became Director-General for Employment, serving until 2011, when he left the civil service.

=== Private sector ===
Sharples worked for Which? for a year, before serving as chairman of the Ixion Group from 2012 until 2017. He has been chairman of the Money Advice Trust since 2016.

== Honours and awards ==
In the 2007 Birthday Honours, Sharples was appointed a Companion of the Order of the Bath (CB).

Other offices
Preceded by None	Director-General, Work, Welfare and Equality Group; Department for Work and Pensions; September 2004–March 2009	Succeeded by Himself (as Director-General, Employment Group)
Preceded by None	Director-General, Work, Welfare and Equality Group; Department for Work and Pensions; September 2004–March 2009	Succeeded by Sue Owen (as Director-General, Welfare and Wellbeing Group)
Preceded by Himself (as Director-General, Work, Welfare and Equality Group)	Director-General, Employment; Department for Work and Pensions; 2009–2011	Succeeded by Position abolished
