= John Sharples =

John Sharples may refer to:

- John Sharples, Sr. (1814–1876), Canadian politician and member of the Legislative Council of Quebec
- John Sharples, Jr. (1847–1913), his son and also a member of the Legislative Council of Quebec
- John Sharples (footballer, born 1934), played for Aston Villa and Walsall in the 1950s and 1960s
- John Sharples (footballer, born 1973), played for Manchester United, Heart of Midlothian, Ayr United and York City in the 1990s
- John Bradshaw Sharples (1845–1913), master craftsman, see public railways of Guyana
