= Whitcott Keysett =

Hamlet in Shropshire, England

Coordinates: 52.437°N 3.068°W

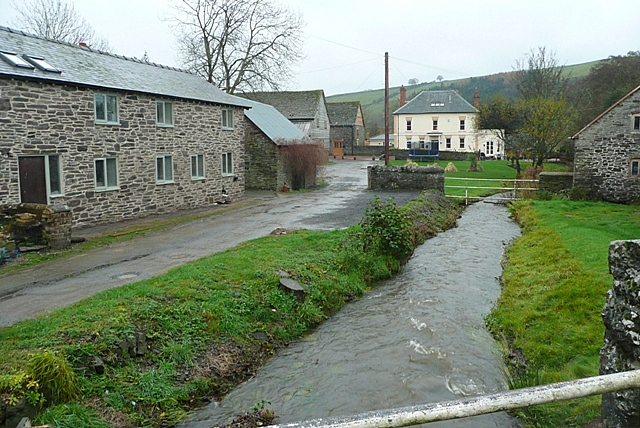
- The centre of Whitcott Keysett

- Location within Shropshire
- OS grid reference: SO274826
- Civil parish: Newcastle-on-Clun; Clun
- Unitary authority: Shropshire
- Ceremonial county: Shropshire
- Region: West Midlands
- Country: England
- Sovereign state: United Kingdom
- Post town: CRAVEN ARMS
- Postcode district: SY7
- Dialling code: 01588
- Police: West Mercia
- Fire: Shropshire
- Ambulance: West Midlands
- UK Parliament: Ludlow

Whitcott Keysett is a hamlet in South Shropshire, England. It is located two miles northwest of the small town of Clun.

The western half of the settlement lies in the civil parish of Newcastle-on-Clun whilst the eastern half lies in Clun.

== See also ==
- Listed buildings in Clun
- Listed buildings in Newcastle on Clun
