= Listed buildings in Clun =

Clun is a civil parish in Shropshire, England. It contains 160 listed buildings that are recorded in the National Heritage List for England. Of these, one is listed at Grade I, the highest of the three grades, seven are at Grade II*, the middle grade, and the others are at Grade II, the lowest grade. The parish contains the small town of Clun, and smaller settlements, including Bicton, Chapel Lawn, New Invention and Whitcott Keysett, and is otherwise entirely rural.

The town has an ancient history, and its oldest surviving listed buildings are the remains of Clun Castle, and the Norman west tower of St George's Church. A high proportion of the listed buildings are houses, cottages, farmhouses, and farm buildings, many of them timber framed, some with cruck construction, and dating from the 13th to the 18th century. In the churchyard of St George's Church are many listed memorials, consisting of chest tombs, pedestal tombs, and a headstone. The River Clun passes through the parish, and the bridge crossing it in the town, which dates back to the 14th or 15th century, is listed. Other listed buildings include hotels and public houses, a group of almshouses, the lychgate to St George's Church, the former town hall, former watermills, a sequence of milestones, another church, a war memorial, and two telephone kiosks.

== Key ==
Grade	Criteria
I	Buildings of exceptional interest, sometimes considered to be internationally important
II*	Particularly important buildings of more than special interest
II	Buildings of national importance and special interest

== Buildings ==
Name and location	Photograph	Date	Notes	Grade
Clun Castle; 52.42227°N 3.03304°W		Late 11th century	The castle is in ruins, and consists of a motte to the west and three baileys to the west. The surviving masonry is in limestone with sandstone dressings and stands on the former motte. Parts of the keep with three storeys and a basement remain, as do fragments of two semicircular towers, and a portion of curtain wall. The castle is also a Scheduled Monument.	I
St George's Church; 52.41854°N 3.03018°W		12th century	The oldest part of the church is the tower, and its top storey was added in the 13th century. Much of the rest of the church was damaged in the Civil War, and this was virtually rebuilt in 1876–77 by G. E. Street. The church is built in limestone and sandstone with some tile patching. It consists of a nave with a clerestory, north and south aisles, a north porch, a chancel, and a west tower. The tower is Norman in style, and has four stages and buttresses. The top consists of a double pyramidal roof, with balusters separating the stages, and at the top is a globe finial and a weathervane. The porch is gabled and has applied timber framing in the upper part.	II*
17 and 19 High Street; 52.42123°N 3.02853°W	—	13th or 14th century (probable)	A house, later a house and a shop, that was remodelled in the 19th century. It is timber framed with cruck construction, refaced in rendered stone, and with a slate roof. There are two storeys, and in the upper floor are four sash windows. The house to the left has a central porch with a gable and a finial, flanked by former shop windows with reeded architraves. The shop has a 19th-century shop front with a pilastered surround, a central door with a fanlight, a fascia, and a cornice. The interior maintains the original hall house plan, and contains two full cruck trusses.	II*
Bryncambric Farmhouse; 52.37615°N 3.00547°W	—	14th or 15th century	The farmhouse was extended in 2002. It was timber framed with cruck construction, the walls have been replaced in limestone, and it has a thatched roof with a stone ridge. There are four bays, an extension in a similar manner, and two storeys. In the ground floor are casement windows, the upper floor contains eyebrow dormers, and the porch has a thatched roof. Inside are timber framed partitions, and three pairs of cruck trusses.	II
Castle Cottage; 52.42118°N 3.03098°W	—	14th or 15th century	The house was remodelled in the 19th century. It is in pebbledashed stone with some timber framing and has a slate roof. The house consists of a hall range with two storeys and three bays, and a cross-wing to the left with one storey and an attic and three bays. The windows in the hall range are sashes with moulded architraves and hood moulds. There are double doors with a reeded surround, a porch with a canopy, and gables with scalloped bargeboards.	II
Clun Bridge; 52.42042°N 3.03032°W		14th or 15th century	The bridge carries the A488 road over the River Clun. It is in limestone and is a hump-backed bridge with five unequal segmental arches. There are three pairs of cutwaters to the north that rise to form refuges at the parapet level.	II*
Llynaven and former stable 52.38399°N 3.02722°W	—	14th or 15th century	A farmhouse and attached outbuilding, initially timber framed and with cruck construction, it was later partly rebuilt and extended in limestone, partly rendered, and with a slate roof. There are two storeys, and partly with one storey and an attic. Facing the road are two gabled wings and a gabled two-storey porch, and the windows are casements. To the right is a lower extension and the former stable that have sash windows and a gabled dormer. Inside are three visible cruck trusses.	II
Former House near Lower Hodre; 52.38515°N 2.99127°W	—	14th or 15th century (probable)	The former house is timber framed with cruck construction on a limestone plinth, weatherboarded and clad in corrugated iron on the south and east fronts, and rebuilt in limestone on the north and west. It has one storey and an attic, it contains an eaves dormer, and inside are two full cruck trusses.	II
1–7 Church Street; 52.42022°N 3.03010°W	—	15th century (probable)	Originally a timber framed hall house with three bays, it was later partially refaced and extended in limestone and brick to form houses and a shop. It has a slate roof, two storeys and an attic, a bracketed porch, and the windows are casements.	II
Sun Inn; 52.42140°N 3.02851°W		15th century	Originally an outbuilding, later a house, then a public house, it is timber framed, refaced and rebuilt and rendered, and with a slate roof. It has two storeys and three bays. The windows are casements, those in the ground floor with decorative glazing, and inside there are three full cruck trusses.	II
Little Hobarris Farmhouse and Outbuilding; 52.39590°N 3.01477°W	—	Late 15th or 16th century	The farmhouse was remodelled in the 19th century. It is timber framed and has been encased or rebuilt in limestone and sandstone, and has a slate roof. There are two storeys and two bays, and a single-storey extension to the left with a corrugated iron roof. The windows are casements.	II
1–3 Little Hospital; 52.42318°N 3.02683°W	—	Early 16th century (probable)	A house, later divided into three, and remodelled in the 19th century, it is basically timber framed and encased or rebuilt probably in limestone and rendered, and it has a slate roof. It is partly in two storeys, and partly in one storey with an attic and basement. The windows are casements, and there are two gabled half-dormers. Inside there is a full cruck truss and a timber framed passage wall.	II
Bryn Farmhouse; 52.46119°N 3.04164°W		Late 16th century (probable)	Probably the remodelling of an earlier timber framed farmhouse, encased or rebuilt in limestone with a stone-slate roof. It has one storey and an attic, and consists of a hall and a gabled cross-wing. There is a two-storey gabled porch, and the windows are casements.	II
5 Guilden Down and cowhouse 52.43774°N 3.02059°W	—	16th or 17th century	The former farmhouse was remodelled in the 19th century. It is timber framed and refaced or rebuilt in limestone, and has a slate roof. There is one storey and an attic, and a T-shaped plan, consisting of a main range and a projecting gabled cross-wing to the south. It contains a gabled porch and casement windows. The gable end at the north of the cross-wing has exposed timber framing and the gable is jettied. The former cowhouse to the south dates from the 19th century and has two storeys.	II
11 High Street; 52.42124°N 3.02784°W	—	16th or 17th century	A farmhouse, later used for other purposes, it was altered in the 19th and 20th centuries. It is possibly timber framed, and rebuilt or refaced in limestone, it is rendered at the front, and has a slate roof. There are two storeys and an L-shaped plan, with a main range and a projecting gabled cross-wing on the left. In the ground floor are 20th-century plate glass windows, and in the upper floor the windows are casements.	II
Field Farmhouse; 52.38688°N 3.05323°W	—	Late 16th or early 17th century	A pair of houses; the older one to the right is timber framed and either encased or rebuilt in limestone, and was extended in the 19th century. It has three bays and a gabled porch. The house to the left dates from about a century later, it is rendered and has two bays. Both houses have two storeys, casement windows, and slate roofs.	II
Clun Farmhouse; 52.42111°N 3.02694°W	—	16th or 17th century	The farmhouse was altered in the 19th century. Possibly originally timber framed, it has been encased or rebuilt in limestone and has a slate roof. The farmhouse has a T-shaped plan with a main range and a projecting gabled cross-wing to the right. There are two storeys and a basement, and the windows are casements.	II
Guilden Down Farmhouse; 52.43759°N 3.02007°W	—	16th or 17th century	The farmhouse was later remodelled and extended. It is timber framed and mostly rebuilt in limestone, rendered on the right side, and with exposed timber framing at the rear, and a slate roof. The farmhouse has two storeys and an L-shaped plan, with a main range and a wing projecting on the right. There is a gabled stone porch and the windows are casements.	II
Weston Farmhouse; 52.42286°N 3.06023°W	—	Late 16th or 17th century	The farmhouse, which was altered and expanded in the 19th century, is timber framed, partly refaced and extended in limestone, slate-hung at the rear, and with a slate roof. There are two storeys, an attic and a basement, two bays, a gabled cross-wing at the right, and two gables at the rear. On the front is a gabled wooden porch, and the windows are casements.	II
6 Bridge Street; 52.42072°N 3.03020°W		1613	The house was remodelled in 1928. It is in limestone on a plinth, pebbledashed at the front, with a slate roof. There are two storeys and an attic, and two bays. The central doorway has a flat hood on wrought iron brackets. To the left is a canted bay window with a frieze, a cornice, and a tented roof. The other windows are casements, in the ground floor with a hood mould.	II
Trinity Hospital; 52.42317°N 3.02619°W		1618	This consists of almshouses and other buildings arranged around a square courtyard. They are in limestone with dressings in sandstone and brick, and have tile roofs, one storey and attics. The buildings are gabled, and contain casement windows and dormers. In the centre of the south range is a square cupola with a clock, a pyramidal roof, a globe finial and a weathervane.	II*
Bryn Cottage and garages 52.46080°N 3.04026°W	—	Early 17th century	A barn converted into a house and garages in the 19th and 20th centuries. It is timber framed and weatherboarded with some rebuilding in limestone, and has a roof partly of slate and partly of stone-slate. There is one storey and an attic, and four bays. The house has a doorway, a gabled half-dormer and a sash window, and in the garages to the left are two pairs of doors.	II
Colesty Farmhouse and Cottage; 52.44760°N 3.02827°W	—	Early 17th century	The farmhouse and cottage are in limestone with brick dressings, a slate roof, and two storeys. The farmhouse has three bays, a gabled timber porch, a doorway with a moulded architrave, and casement windows. The cottage, originally two cottages, dates from the 19th century, and contains casement windows with segmental heads.	II
Former House, Squire Farm; 52.37686°N 2.99835°W	—	Early 17th century	The house, later used for other purposes, is timber framed with infill in wattle and daub and red brick, and is on a limestone plinth. It has been rebuilt in limestone on the south front and has a slate roof. There are two storeys and three bays, and the windows are casements with segmental heads in the ground floor.	II
Pen-Y-Wern; 52.40327°N 3.02058°W	—	c. 1650	The farmhouse, later a private house, was altered in 1747. It is in stone, partly rendered, and has a slate roof. There are 2½ storeys, a main range, and an outshut to the left. The windows are a mix of casements and sashes, and above the doorway is a datestone. Inside the house is an inglenook fireplace and a bressumer.	II
2 and 4 Church Street; 52.41999°N 3.03037°W	—	17th century (possible)	A pair of limestone houses with a slate roof, two storeys and attics. The right house is rendered, with a large gable to the right, steps leading up to a central doorway, and casement windows. The left house has a large carriageway entry on the left and above it is a gabled eaves dormer with decorative bargeboards. The doorway has a bracketed hood, and the windows are casements, in the ground floor with segmental heads.	II
Stables and barn, Bicton Farm; 52.43854°N 3.04749°W	—	17th century	The older part is the barn, the stable being added in the 19th century, forming an L-shaped plan. The barn is timber framed and weatherboarded with a tile roof, partly hipped. It has three bays and contains doorways, a loft door and ventilation slits. The stable wing is in limestone with a slate roof, and its openings have segmental heads.	II
Bryn House; 52.46058°N 3.04016°W	—	17th century	The house was remodelled and greatly extended in the 19th century. The original part forms the northeast wing, it is timber framed with cruck construction, and with some limestone, and it has a slate roof. The wing has one storey and an attic, and 2½ bays. The extension is in limestone with a slate roof and has two storeys and attics. The southeast front has three bays, the windows are casements, and there are three gabled half-dormers. Inside the original part are full cruck trusses.	II
Barn and cowhouses, Bryn Farm; 52.46100°N 3.04194°W		17th century (probable)	The older part is the barn, which is timber framed and weatherboarded on a stone plinth. The central bay has been rebuilt in stone, and a cowhouse was added at each end in the 19th century; these are in stone and the roof is in stone-slate. The building has one storey and a loft, and contains doors and loft doors.	II
Castle Farmhouse; 52.42002°N 3.03011°W	—	17th century	The farmhouse was partly remodelled in the 19th century. It is probably timber framed and partly rebuilt and extended in limestone, rendered on the west front, and with a slate roof, hipped to the right. There are two parallel ranges, the rear range has two storeys, and the front range two storeys, a basement and an attic. The windows are windows, and in the left return five steps lead up to a doorway with a bracketed hood.	II
Former house near North-easterly Chapel Lawn Farmhouse; 52.38038°N 3.00490°W	—	17th century	The house has been remodelled and used for other purposes, it is timber framed and weatherboarded on a limestone plinth, with a limestone gable end and a corrugated iron roof. It has a T-shaped plan, one storey and an attic, and inside is a timber framed cross-wall.	II
South-westerly Chapel Lawn Farmhouse; 52.38011°N 3.00581°W	—	17th century	The farmhouse was extended, probably in the 19th century. It is timber framed and rendered, with a slate roof. There are two storeys and three bays, a lean-to on the right, and a rear wing. The central doorway has a gabled porch, there is a small staircase window, and the other windows are casements.	II
Cwm Colstey; 52.45117°N 3.02748°W	—	Mid 17th century	The house was altered and extended in the 18th and 19th centuries. The original part is timber framed with plaster infill, which has been encased or rebuilt, and extended, in limestone, and the roof is slated. It has two storeys, an L-shaped plan, and contains casement windows.	II
Farm buildings, Leasowes Farm; 52.42421°N 3.04627°W	—	17th century	The farm buildings, which were extended in the 18th and 19th centuries, consist of a barn, cowhouses, a stable, a cartshed and a granary, they have one and two storeys, and form an L-shaped plan. The barn and cowhouses are timber framed and weatherboarded, there is an addition to the southwest in limestone with a stone-slate roof, and a 19th-century extension in timber framing with brick nogging in the upper storey and a slate roof.	II
Little Bicton; 52.43750°N 3.04872°W	—	17th century (probable)	The house was remodelled in the 19th century, and is probably timber framed and refaced or rebuilt in limestone. The upper floor of the cross-wing is tile-hung, and the roof is tiled. There are two storeys, two bays, a projecting gabled cross-wing to the right, and a single-storey lean-to on the left. On the front is a timber-framed gabled porch, and the windows are casements.	II
Barn, Little Hall Farm; 52.43441°N 3.07529°W	—	17th century	The barn is timber framed, partly weatherboarded and partly clad in corrugated iron, on a limestone plinth, with a limestone extension and a corrugated iron roof. It has one and two storeys, five bays and an additional stone bay to the west, and a lean-to at the rear. It contains doorways and loft doors.	II
Barn, Little Hobarris Farm; 52.39613°N 3.01431°W	—	17th century	The barn is timber framed and weatherboarded on a limestone plinth, with a corrugated iron roof. It contains two doors and four pitching holes.	II
Lower Hodre; 52.38618°N 2.99221°W	—	17th century	A timber framed farmhouse encased or rebuilt in limestone with a slate roof. It consists of a main range with two storeys and an attic and two bays, a cross wing with two storeys, and a former converted agricultural building. The windows are casements, and in the former agriculture building is a flat-topped eaves dormer.	II
Old Stone Cottage; 52.42184°N 3.03052°W	—	17th century (probable)	The house was refaced and remodelled in the 19th century. It is in limestone with a slate roof. There are two storeys at the front, one storey and an attic at the rear, and a front of two bays. On the front is a lean-to porch and casement windows, those on the ground floor with segmental heads.	II
Ship House; 52.42158°N 3.02656°W		17th century	A house, at one time an inn, it was extended in the 19th century. The house is timber framed and rebuilt or refaced in limestone with brick dressings, and has an asbestos slate roof. There are two storeys, two bays, the left bay projecting under a cat slide roof, and extensions at the rear. The doorway and windows, which are casements, all have segmental heads.	II
Barn and cowhouse, Squire Farm; 52.37673°N 2.99865°W	—	17th century	The older part is the barn, which is timber framed and weatherboarded with a corrugated iron roof. It has three bays, in part it has one storey and in the other part one storey and a loft. The cowhouse was added probably in the 19th century and is in limestone.	II
Sun Inn (part); 52.42137°N 3.02831°W		17th century	A house and shop, later part of a public house, it was originally timber framed and later rebuilt probably in limestone and rendered, and has a slate roof. There are two storeys and two bays. In the upper floor are two sash windows, and a small casement window to the left. The ground floor contains a casement window and a former shop front that has a pilastered surround, a fascia, and a moulded cornice. Inside is a timber framed cross-wall.	II
The Buffalo Hotel and Former Barn; 52.42124°N 3.03035°W		17th century	Originally a house and a barn, later a public house, it was remodelled in the 19th century. It is in limestone, and has a roof in slate and stone-slate. There are two storeys and an attic, and a front of four bays, the left two bays gabled with decorative bargeboards. The central doorway has a triangular pedimented hood, and the windows are cross-windows. To the right is a single-storey extension with segmental-headed windows, and beyond that is a former barn which is timber framed, weatherboarded on the front, partly rebuilt in brick at the rear, and with a limestone end wall.	II
The Quern; 52.37804°N 2.99483°W	—	17th century	A farmhouse and a watermill, the latter converted into a house. The farmhouse is the older, it is timber framed with plaster infill, partly rendered and brick clad, and has a slate roof. There is one storey and an attic, and two bays. There is a lean-to porch, the windows are casements, there is an eaves dormer, and the gable is jettied. The watermill dates from the 19th century, it is in limestone, and has a slate roof, two storeys and an attic, casement windows and two gabled eaves dormers.	II
The Rhoneth; 52.43761°N 3.06809°W		17th century	The house, which was altered in the 18th and 19th centuries, is timber framed and encased or rebuilt in limestone, and has a slate roof. It has two storeys, and its plan consists of a two-bay hall range, and a gabled cross-wing. The windows are casements, one of which is mullioned, and in the gable is exposed weatherboarding.	II
Boundary wall, gatepiers, gates and former mortuary, Trinity Hospital; 52.42321°N 3.02542°W	—	17th century (probable)	The walls are in limestone, the walls on the north, northwest and east sides being the oldest. The south and southwest walls date from the 19th century, and contain sandstone gate piers on plinths with moulded caps; between them are cast iron gates. In the northeast corner is a former mortuary in limestone with a slate roof and one storey.	II
Barn, Upper Farm; 52.43797°N 3.01997°W	—	17th century	The barn is timber framed, partly weatherboarded and partly clad in corrugated iron, on a limestone plinth with a roof of corrugated iron. It has one storey and a loft, and six bays. In the north front are a central door, four loft doors, and two gabled half-dormers.	II
Barn, cowhouse and stables, Whitcott Hall; 52.43702°N 3.06840°W	—	17th century	The farm buildings were extended in the 19th century. The original part is timber framed and weatherboarded on a limestone plinth, the later part is partly timber framed and partly in limestone, and the roofs are in stone-slate. The buildings have two storey and form a U-shaped plan, consisting of a four-bay cowhouse range, a three-bay barn, and a stable with a granary at right angles.	II
14 High Street; 52.42139°N 3.02893°W	—	Late 17th century	The house was remodelled and extended to the north in the 19th century. It is in limestone with a slate roof, and has an L-shaped plan, two storeys and a basement. In the south front are mullioned and transomed windows, a porch with a hipped slate roof, and a basement opening with a segmental head. In the west front are sash windows and a porch with flanking mullioned and transomed windows.	II
4 and 5 Little Hospital; 52.42315°N 3.02695°W	—	Late 17th century	Two cottages, including a 19th-century extension, with one storey and attics. The oldest part is timber framed with rendered infill and two bays, and the later part is in red brick at right angles; the roofs are slated. The windows are casements, and in the original part is a raking eaves dormer.	II
The Vicarage; 52.41879°N 3.02958°W		Late 17th century	The vicarage, which was altered and expanded in the 18th and 19th centuries, is in limestone, roughcast at the rear, and has a hipped slate roof. There are two storeys and an attic, a front of seven bays, four bays on the sides, and a single-storey lean-to extension protruding on the left. In the centre is a timber gabled, porch. Most of the windows on the front are cross-windows, elsewhere are casement and sash windows, and in the roof is a flat-topped dormer.	II*
Lower House; 52.42152°N 3.02757°W		1682	The house was remodelled in the 19th century. It is in limestone, roughcast at the front, and has a slate roof. The house has two storeys and an attic, an H-shaped plan with three bays and two gables at the front, and a lean-to extension at the rear. There is a central timber gabled porch with decorative bargeboards and a finial, and the windows are casements.	II
Walkmill Cottages; 52.42325°N 3.01676°W	—	c. 1700	A pair of cottages, altered in the 19th and 20th centuries, and combined into one dwelling. It is in limestone with a slate roof, and has one storey and an attic. There is an L-shaped plan, with a main range and a gabled cross-wing to the right. The windows are casements.	II
4 Bicton; 52.43690°N 3.04867°W	—	Late 17th or early 18th century (probable)	A timber framed cottage with applied timber framing and limestone end walls, partly rendered, with a tile roof. There is one storey and an attic, two casement windows in the ground floor and two gabled eaves dormers above.	II
Bicton Farmhouse; 52.43871°N 3.04733°W	—	Late 17th or early 18th century	The farmhouse is in limestone, partly timber framed at the rear, with a tile roof. It has two storeys, four bays, casement windows, a porch with a hipped roof, and a lean-to on the right.	II
Barn, Whitcott Evan Farm; 52.42914°N 3.06314°W	—	Late 17th or early 18th century	The barn is timber framed and weatherboarded on a plinth of limestone and sandstone, and has a corrugated iron roof. There are two storeys, and in the south front are six pitching holes, seven doorways, and a pair of cart entrances.	II
3 High Street and outbuilding 52.42129°N 3.02570°W	—	1709	A cottage in limestone with a stone-slate roof. It has one storey and an attic, one casement window in the ground floor, and a gabled dormer above. To the right is a timber framed and weatherboarded outbuilding.	II
6 and 8 Church Street; 52.41983°N 3.03031°W	—	1711	A pair of cottages, one formerly a shop, in limestone, roughcast at the front, with a slate roof and two storeys. On the front is a former shop window, two doorways, one with a fanlight, and casement windows.	II
Lychgate; 52.41905°N 3.03019°W		1723	The lychgate is at the entrance to the churchyard of St George's Church. It was dismantled in 1841, re-erected in about 1881, and restored in 1956. The lychgate has a timber frame on low limestone walls and a stone-slate roof. It is gabled on all sides and has moulded bargeboards and a finial.	II
Wells Farmhouse and cowhouses 52.38669°N 3.07263°W	—	1732	The farmhouse is in limestone with a slate roof, and has two storeys, and two bays, and contains casement windows. The cowhouse to the right is later and in two parts. It is timber framed and weatherboarded with a corrugated iron roof. and contains three doors and two loft doors.	II
Barn and Cowhouse, Bicton Farm; 52.43837°N 3.04690°W	—	Early to mid 18th century	The barn and cowhouse form two ranges at right angles. The left range is timber framed and weatherboarded with five bays, and contains a loft entry, doors and hatches. There is a lean-to at the left end, and a stone mill projection at the northeast. The right range is partly timber framed with two bays in stone, and contains stable doors and windows. The roofs are partly in slate and partly in stone-slate.	II
Outbuilding, Castle Cottage; 52.42108°N 3.03125°W	—	18th century	Stables that were remodelled in the 19th century, the older part is timber framed with brick infill, the extension is weatherboarded with brick piers and some stone, and the roof is slated. There are two storeys and five bays, two of the bays being open.	II
Range of Cowhouses, Colesty Farm; 52.44791°N 3.02812°W	—	18th century	A range of buildings in limestone with a corrugated iron roof to the north, and with a timber framed and weatherboarded front and a slate roof to the south. They have one storey and a loft, and contain ground floor doors, and a gabled loft half-dormer.	II
Sundial, South-westerly Chapel Lawn Farmhouse; 52.38000°N 3.00579°W	—	18th century (probable)	The sundial is in sandstone and has a square plan. It has a shaped baluster stem with a moulded base and cap, and a square dial. The inscription is illegible.	II
Crown House; 52.41948°N 3.03028°W	—	18th century (probable)	A house, at one time an inn, it is roughcast on a limestone plinth, and has a slate roof. There are two storeys and a basement. Steps from the left lead up to a doorway with a triangular pedimented hood on brackets. In the upper floor are three casement windows, in the ground floor is a cross-window on the right and a modern multi-paned window on the left. Further to the left is a carriageway door and to the right is a basement door.	II
Whitcott Hall; 52.43697°N 3.06878°W	—	Mid 18th century	The farmhouse, which was altered in the 19th century, is in brick on a rendered stone plinth, with sandstone dressings, quoins, and a hipped slate roof. There are two storeys, five bays, and a later single-storey lean-to on the right. In the centre is a gabled wooden porch and a doorway with a rectangular fanlight, and there is a later inserted door on the right. In the lean-to is a casement window, and the other windows are sashes.	II
Acton House; 52.41835°N 3.03298°W	—	Mid to late 18th century	A roughcast house, a slate roof, two storeys and an attic, and a two-bay front. Steps lead up to a central doorway, and the windows are sashes.	II
Chest tomb north of north porch 52.41878°N 3.03037°W	—	Mid to late 18th century	The tomb is in the churchyard of St George's Church. It is a chest tomb in sandstone, and has a limestone base, a moulded plinth, raised panels, a shaped corner baluster, and a moulded top. The inscription is illegible.	II
St Catherines; 52.42123°N 3.02828°W	—	Mid to late 18th century	A house, then a cottage hospital, and later converted into flats, it is stuccoed on a recessed plinth, with quoins, a moulded eaves cornice, and a hipped slate roof. There are two storeys and a symmetrical front of five bays. The central doorway has Doric pilasters, a rectangular fanlight, and an entablature with a dentil cornice and a triangular pediment. The windows are sashes, and there is an inscribed plaque detailing the building's history.	II
The Old Vicarage and enclosure 52.42110°N 3.02929°W		Mid to late 18th century	The vicarage, later a private house, is in limestone with a dentil eaves cornice and a slate roof. It is in Georgian style, with three storeys and an attic, and a front of three bays, the middle bay slightly projecting. The middle bay has a triangular pediment containing a lunette, and the other windows are sashes. The central doorway has a moulded architrave, a rectangular fanlight with Gothick tracery, and a triangular bracketed pediment. In front of the house is an enclosure with wrought iron railings, and inside the house are timber framed partition walls.	II
Jones Memorial; 52.41872°N 3.03036°W	—	Late 18th century	The memorial is in the churchyard of St George's Church, and is to the memory of two members of the Jones family. It is a chest tomb in sandstone, and has a moulded plinth, raised panels, recessed corner piers with moulded capitals and bases, and a flat top with a moulded cornice.	II
Jones Memorial; 52.41904°N 3.03014°W	—	Late 18th century	The memorial is in the churchyard of St George's Church, and is to the memory of Edward Jones. It is a pedestal tomb in sandstone, and has a moulded plinth, sunken panels, a moulded cornice, and ogee capping.	II
Outbuilding, The Old Vicarage; 52.42106°N 3.02944°W	—	Late 18th century	The building is in limestone on a projecting plinth and has a slate roof. There is one storey and an attic, one window in the front facing the street, and one in the gable end.	II
Villa Farmhouse; 52.42473°N 3.03143°W		Late 18th century	A limestone farmhouse, rendered on the front, with a two-span slate roof, hipped at the front and gabled at the rear. There are three storeys, a main range with three bays, a rear wing that is parallel and to the right, and a lean-to on the right end. The windows are casement windows with segmental heads, and the central doorway has a rectangular fanlight with Gothick tracery, and a bracketed flat hood.	II
Clun Museum; 52.42138°N 3.02968°W		1780	Originally a market hall, it was remodelled and the ground floor arcade filled in probably in the late 19th century. The lower part of the ground floor is in sandstone on a plinth, above it is in roughcast limestone, with bands, a moulded eaves cornice, and a hipped slate roof. There are two storeys and a south front of three bays. In the ground floor are three arches, the central one a doorway, the others converted into windows, and in the upper floor is a central lunette flanked by casement windows. In the west front is another arched doorway above which is a coat of arms, and on the roof is a square cupola with an ogee cap, a globe finial, and a weathervane.	II*
Edwards Memorial; 52.41880°N 3.03033°W	—	1789	The memorial is in the churchyard of St George's Church, and is to the memory of Nancy Edwards. It is a chest tomb in sandstone, and has a moulded plinth, sunken side panels with flanking cable-fluted pilaster strips, raised end-panels, and a moulded cornice to the flat top.	II
Bryncalled Farmhouse; 52.37989°N 2.98153°W	—	c. 1790	The farmhouse, later a private house, probably contains 17th-century material. It is in slate stone, rendered on the front, with a hipped roof in slate at the front and corrugated iron at the rear. It has an L-shaped plan, with a symmetrical front of three bays, and a rear wing on the left. There are three storeys, and above the centre bay is a pediment containing a lunette. The central doorway has pilasters, a fanlight, and an open pediment. The windows are casements, and in the angle at the rear is a canted bay window.	II
Farm buildings, Bryncalled Farm; 52.38020°N 2.98207°W	—	c. 1790	The farm buildings are timber framed and weatherboarded with some stone, and have roofs partly of Welsh slate and partly of corrugated iron. They have two storeys and are in three ranges forming a U-shaped plan. The buildings include a granary, a cart shed, a barn, a cowhouse, and a stable.	II
Lake House; 52.42580°N 3.02579°W	—	c. 1800	A mill house, later a farmhouse, it is in limestone with sandstone lintels and a slate roof. There are two storeys and an attic, and three bays. The central doorway has a rectangular fanlight and a timber porch, and the windows are sashes.	II
4 Bridge Street; 52.42081°N 3.03004°W		Late 18th or early 19th century	A sandstone cottage with a slate roof, two storeys and two bays. In the centre is a doorway with a flat hood, and the windows are casements, those in the ground floor with segmental heads and recessed tympani.	II
8 Bridge Street; 52.42067°N 3.03031°W		Late 18th or early 19th century	The house is in rendered limestone with brick in the right gable end, and a slate roof. There are two storeys and an attic, two bays, and a rear wing. The central doorway has a flat hood on wrought iron brackets, and the windows are sashes.	II
Stable or Cowhouse, Bryn Farm; 52.46130°N 3.04143°W	—	Late 18th or early 19th century	The building is in limestone and has a slate roof. There is one storey, and it contains a central doorway flanked by two square windows.	II
Barn and Cowhouse, South-westerly Chapel Lawn Farmhouse; 52.38039°N 3.00591°W	—	Late 18th or early 19th century	The barn and cowhouse are timber framed and weatherboarded on a limestone plinth with a slate roof. The barn is to the north, and has four bays, and the buildings contain doors and loft doors, and in the right gable end are three tiers of vents and a loft door.	II
Ford House; 52.42261°N 3.02695°W	—	Late 18th or early 19th century	A stuccoed house with a slate roof, two storeys, and a symmetrical front of three bays. In the centre is a lattice wooden porch, and the windows are casements.	II
Cowhouse, Guilden Down Farm; 52.43737°N 3.01997°W	—	Late 18th or early 19th century (probable)	The cowhouse is in limestone, timber framed at the rear with corrugated iron cladding, it is on a plinth, and has a roof of slate and corrugated iron. There is one storey and a loft, and it contains doors, loft doors, and two tiers of vents.	II
Jones Memorial; 52.41872°N 3.03014°W	—	Late 18th or early 19th century	The memorial is in the churchyard of St George's Church, and is to the memory of members of the Jones family. It is a chest tomb in sandstone, and has a moulded plinth, side panels with carved radial-fan corners, corners shaped as extended balusters, and a plain top.	II
Jones Memorial; 52.41885°N 3.03020°W	—	Late 18th or early 19th century	The memorial is in the churchyard of St George's Church, and is to the memory of members of the Jones family, including William Jones, a surgeon. It is a pedestal tomb in sandstone, and has a moulded plinth, sunken panels, a moulded cornice, and concave capping to an egg-shaped finial.	II
Little Hall Farmhouse; 52.43424°N 3.07547°W	—	Late 18th or early 19th century	The farmhouse, which possibly has an earlier core, is in a mixture of limestone and sandstone, with the left gable end slate-hung, the right gable end rendered, and the roof slated. There are two storeys and an attic, three bays, a lower two-storey service wing to the right, and a lean-to on the right. Above the middle bay is a triangular pedimented gable containing a lunette. The central doorway has a five-light fanlight, and the windows are casements. In the main part are the remains of a full cruck truss.	II
Former stables and coach house, The Old Vicarage; 52.42098°N 3.02956°W	—	Late 18th or early 19th century	The former stables and coach house are timber framed and weatherboarded on a limestone plinth and end walls, and the building has an asbestos slate roof. There are two storeys, and three bays. (Note: Street View in May 2009 shows that the building has been converted for residential use.)	II
Rutton Memorial; 52.41868°N 3.03039°W	—	c. 1802	The memorial is in the churchyard of St George's Church, and is to the memory of William Rutton. It is a pedestal tomb in sandstone, and has sunken panels, a moulded cornice, and concave capping to an urn finial with swags.	II
Lankey Memorial; 52.41879°N 3.03035°W	—	c. 1805	The memorial is in the churchyard of St George's Church, and is to the memory of Richard Lankey. It is a chest tomb in sandstone, and has a moulded plinth, sunken side panels with flanking fluted pilaster strips, raised end panels, and a plain top.	II
Shadwell Hall; 52.46402°N 3.06831°W	—	1812	A rendered farmhouse on a plinth, with a hipped slate roof. There are two storeys, a T-shaped plan, three bays on the southeast front, and a single-storey kitchen wing at the rear. The entrance is in the angle and has a doorway with a pilastered surround and a bracketed hood. The windows are sashes with segmental heads.	II
Farmbuildings, Shadwell Hall; 52.46340°N 3.06895°W	—	c. 1812 (probable)	The farm buildings are part of a model farm, and consist of a cowhouse, stables, a cartshed, and a granary. They are in limestone with some repairs in concrete, they have roofs limestone and some corrugated asbestos, and form an L-shaped plan.	II
The Hurst; 52.42037°N 3.00705°W	—	1813	A country house in limestone, rendered on the front with a slate roof. There are two storeys, an attic and cellars, and a front of three bays. On the front is a string course, two gables on the outer bays with coped verges and finials linked by a parapet, and flanking diagonal buttresses with cross-gabled finials. The porch has a Tudor arched entrance, diagonal buttresses, a parapet with a crest. The windows are sashes with chamfered surrounds, and in the garden front is a square bay window.	II
Gwilliam Memorial; 52.41888°N 3.03005°W	—	1819	The memorial is in the churchyard of St George's Church, and is to the memory of Thomas Gwilliam. It is a chest tomb in sandstone, and has a moulded plinth, sunken side-panels, flanking cable-fluted pilaster strips, raised end panels, shaped quadrant corner-balusters, and a moulded cornice to a chamfered top.	II
Hamar Memorial; 52.41871°N 3.03010°W	—	c. 1819	The memorial is in the churchyard of St George's Church, and is to the memory of Jane Hamar. It is a chest tomb in sandstone, and has a chamfered plinth, sunken panels, flanking fluted pilaster strips, vase-shaped balusters, and a chamfered top.	II
13 Church Street; 52.41957°N 3.03005°W	—	Early 19th century	A rendered house with a slate roof, two storeys and three bays. There is a central doorway, and the windows are sashes.	II
23 and 25 High Street; 52.42123°N 3.02889°W	—	Early 19th century	A pair of shops in limestone, rendered at the front, with a slate roof and two storeys. No. 25 has two bays, and No. 23 is a gabled cross-wing to the left. No. 23 has a late 19th-century shop front with a projecting window to the left, a door to the right, and a fascia with a cornice above them. In the upper floor is a canted bay window with a tented canopy. No. 25 has an early 19th-century shop front with a central doorway flanked by shop windows under a fascia and cornice, and in the upper floor are sash windows.	II
Brown Memorial; 52.41889°N 3.03022°W	—	Early 19th century	The memorial is in the churchyard of St George's Church, and is to the memory of two members of the Brown family. It is a pedestal tomb in sandstone, and has a moulded plinth, sunken panels, an entablature with a moulded cornice, and concave capping to an ovoid finial.	II
Cowhouses and malthouse, Chapel Lawn Farm; 52.38023°N 3.00559°W	—	Early 19th century	The cowhouses to the left are timber framed with brick nogging on a limestoneplinth, and have a weatherboarded loft and a slate roof. The former malthouse to the right is in limestone and brick with two and three storeys. External steps lead up to a segmental-headed door.	II
Clun Mill; 52.42494°N 3.02561°W		Early 19th century	Originally a watermill, later used as a youth hostel, it is in limestone with a slate roof. There is an H-shaped plan, with a three-storey gabled block on the left, a two-storey gabled block on the right, and a two-storey link between them. In the left block are windows, a doorway, and a loading door, and in the other parts are casement windows, all with segmental heads. The mill machinery is virtually complete.	II
Pentre Farmhouse; 52.38405°N 3.01638°W	—	Early 19th century	The farmhouse is in limestone with a slate roof, an L-shaped plan, two storeys, and three bays. The windows are casements, those in the ground floor with segmental heads. The doorway has a three-light fanlight and a segmental head.	II
Barn and Cowhouse, Pentre Farm; 52.38441°N 3.01672°W	—	Early 19th century	The barn and cowhouse form a long range. The barn at the north is timber framed and weatherboarded on a stone plinth and has a slate roof. It contains pitching openings, cart doors and smaller doors. The cowhouse has a limestone ground floor, timber framing and weatherboarding above, and a slate roof. It contains a door, loft doors, a window and vents.	II
Cowhouse, Pentre Farm; 52.38421°N 3.01678°W	—	Early 19th century	The cowhouse is timber framed and weatherboarded with some limestone, and has a slate roof. There are two storeys and four bays. (Note: Street View in May 2009 shows that the building has been converted for residential use.)	II
Dovecote, The Hurst; 52.41915°N 3.00452°W	—	Early 19th century	The dovecote is in limestone with a moulded eaves cornice and a stone-slate roof. It has an octagonal plan, a doorway, small windows, and an ogee-capped cupola with a weathervane. Inside are nesting boxes.	II
Stable block, The Hurst; 52.41994°N 3.00617°W	—	Early 19th century	The stable block is in limestone with a moulded eaves cornice and a slate roof. There are two storeys and an attic, two doorways with fanlights and casement windows, all with segmental heads. In the centre is a gable containing a clock face with an egg and dart surround, and on the roof is an octagonal cupola with an ogee cap.	II
Chest tomb north of north aisle 52.41880°N 3.03007°W	—	Early 19th century	The tomb is in the churchyard of St George's Church. It is a chest tomb in sandstone, and has paired raised panels, large moulded quadrant corners, and a moulded top. The inscription is illegible.	II
Chest tomb north of north aisle 52.41881°N 3.03000°W	—	Early 19th century	The tomb is in the churchyard of St George's Church. It is a chest tomb in sandstone, and has a moulded plinth, raised panels, shaped corner balusters, and a chamfered top. The inscription is illegible.	II
Chest tomb northwest of north porch 52.41872°N 3.03044°W	—	Early 19th century (probable)	The tomb is in the churchyard of St George's Church. It is a chest tomb in sandstone, and has a moulded plinth, sunken panels, shaped corner balusters and a chamfered top. The inscription is illegible.	II
Wellings Memorial; 52.41896°N 3.03001°W	—	Early 19th century	The memorial is in the churchyard of St George's Church, and is to the memory of two members of the Welling family. It is a pedestal tomb in sandstone, and has sunken panels, an entablature with a moulded cornice, and concave capping.	II
Waterloo House and barn 52.41973°N 3.02625°W		Early 19th century (probable)	The farmhouse is in limestone and has a tile roof, two storeys and three bays. In the centre is a gabled porch, and the windows are casements. The barn behind the house dates from the mid-19th century, and is mainly in stone with some timber framing and weatherboarding, and it has a slate roof. It contains doors and a casement window.	II
Luther Memorial; 52.41898°N 3.03018°W	—	c. 1830	The memorial is in the churchyard of St George's Church, and is to the memory of two members of the Luther family. It is a chest tomb in sandstone, and has a chamfered plinth, sunken panels with vase-shaped balusters, and moulding to a plain top.	II
Hamar Memorial; 52.41871°N 3.03015°W	—	c. 1830	The memorial is in the churchyard of St George's Church, and is to the memory of William Hamar. It is a pedestal tomb in sandstone, and has sunken panels, an entablature with a moulded cornice, and a globe finial with a central raised fluted band.	II
Stable Block and Coach House, The Hurst; 52.41950°N 3.00610°W	—	c. 1830	The stable block and coach house are in limestone with a slate roof, hipped to the left. They are on two levels, and incorporate a cider house in the basement. The buildings contain four elliptical-headed coach entries and a large semicircular archway, all with hood moulds and keystones.	II
Wellings Memorial; 52.41875°N 3.02998°W	—	c. 1830	The memorial is in the churchyard of St George's Church, and is to the memory of two members of the Wellings family. It is a pedestal tomb in sandstone, and has a moulded plinth, raised panels with quadrant corners, an entablature with a moulded cornice, and concave capping to a square finial.	II
Hamar Memorial; 52.41872°N 3.03007°W	—	c. 1830–35	The memorial is in the churchyard of St George's Church, and is to the memory of members of the Hamar family. It is a pedestal tomb in sandstone, and has a moulded plinth, sunken panels, a moulded cornice and concave capping to a swagged urn finial.	II
Haynes Memorial; 52.41896°N 3.03026°W	—	c. 1833	The memorial is in the churchyard of St George's Church, and is to the memory of Stephen Haynes. It is a chest tomb in sandstone, and has a moulded plinth, raised panels, shaped corner balusters, and a plain top.	II
2 Bridge Street; 52.42087°N 3.02995°W	—	Early to mid 19th century	A shop, later a house, it is in red brick with a slate roof, two storeys and two bays. The central doorway has panelled pilasters, a frieze and a cornice. To the right is a multi-paned shop window with panelled pilasters, a fascia, and a cornice, and the other windows are sashes.	II
10 Church Street; 52.41976°N 3.03026°W	—	Early to mid 19th century (probable)	A pair of rendered cottages with a slate roof. They have two storeys, and contain two doorways and casement windows, two on the ground floor and three in the upper floor.	II
12 Church Street; 52.41968°N 3.03028°W	—	Early to mid 19th century (probable)	A rendered cottage with a slate roof and two storeys. There is a casement window in each floor, and a doorway to the left.	II
10, 12 and 14 The Square; 52.42144°N 3.03019°W		Early to mid 19th century	A row of three houses, the central house later converted into a shop and a public house. They are stuccoed with slate roofs, and have two and three storeys, and five bays. There are four sash windows, the other windows being casements and cross-windows. There is a shop front in the middle part, and a projecting former shop front in the right house.	II
Brown Memorial; 52.41882°N 3.03033°W	—	Early to mid 19th century	The memorial is in the churchyard of St George's Church, and is to the memory of two members of the Brown family. It is a chest tomb in sandstone, and has a moulded plinth, sunken side-panels with flanking cable-fluted pilaster strips, raised end panels, shaped quarter corner balusters, and a moulded cornice to a flat top.	II
Caradoc House and coach house 52.41942°N 3.03004°W		Early to mid 19th century	The house and coach house are in limestone with slate roofs. The house has three storeys and a symmetrical front of three bays. The central doorway is approached by two steps and has pilasters, a rectangular fanlight, and an open triangular pedimented hood on shaped brackets, and the windows are casements. The coach house to the left has two storeys, a window in the upper storey and garage doors below.	II
Edwards Memorial; 52.41870°N 3.03038°W	—	Early to mid 19th century	The memorial is in the churchyard of St George's Church, and is to the memory of two members of the Edwards family. It is a chest tomb in sandstone, and has a chamfered plinth, sunken panels, corner piers with shallow trefoiled panels, and a chamfered top.	II
Edwards Memorial; 52.41880°N 3.03033°W	—	Early to mid 19th century	The memorial is in the churchyard of St George's Church, and is to the memory of two members of the Edwards family. It is a chest tomb in sandstone, and has a moulded plinth, sunken side-panels with flanking fluted pilaster strips, raised end panels, shaped quarter corner balusters, a chevron-carved frieze, and a chamfered top.	II
Gough Memorial; 52.41859°N 3.03051°W	—	Early to mid 19th century	The memorial is in the churchyard of St George's Church, and is to the memory of members of the Gough family, and others. It is a pedestal tomb in sandstone, and has a moulded plinth, free-standing corner balusters, a moulded cornice, and concave capping to a finial with a central raised band.	II
Harpton House and Shop; 52.42143°N 3.02937°W	—	Early to mid 19th century	The house and shop are in limestone on a plinth and have a slate roof. There are two storeys, two parallel ranges, and the house has three bays, with the shop to the left. In the centre of the house, steps lead up to a doorway with a three-light fanlight and a flat hood on wrought iron brackets, and the windows are sashes. The shop front to the left has a pilastered surround, a central doorway with a fanlight, and a moulded cornice.	II
Laurel Cottage; 52.42221°N 3.02614°W	—	Early to mid 19th century	A limestone house with a slate roof, two storeys and three bays. Two steps lead up to a central doorway with a rectangular fanlight and a bracketed flat hood, and the windows are sashes.	II
Luther Memorial; 52.41892°N 3.03020°W	—	Early to mid 19th century	The memorial is in the churchyard of St George's Church, and is to the memory of members of the Luther family. It is a pedestal tomb in sandstone, and has a moulded plinth, sunken panels, an entablature with a Gothick frieze of ogee-headed panels, a moulded cornice, and concave capping to a moulded urn finial.	II
Parry Memorial; 52.41878°N 3.03027°W	—	Early to mid 19th century	The memorial is in the churchyard of St George's Church, and is to the memory of Jane Parry. It is a pedestal tomb in sandstone, and has a moulded plinth, sunken panels, a string course, a carved scroll frieze, a moulded cornice, and concave capping to an ovoid finial.	II
Parry Memorial and dislodged finial 52.41875°N 3.03022°W	—	Early to mid 19th century	The memorial is in the churchyard of St George's Church, and is to the memory of two members of the Parry family. It is a pedestal tomb in sandstone, and has a chamfered plinth, sunken panels, a moulded cornice, and a dislodged globe finial with a central raised band.	II
Former Coach House and Stables, The Vicarage; 52.41871°N 3.02933°W	—	Early to mid 19th century	The coach house and stables, later used for other purposes, are in limestone with an asbestos slate roof. There are two storeys, and the building contains two doors with fanlights, two garage doors, two loft doors, and a small casement window.	II
Langford Memorial; 52.41877°N 3.03020°W	—	c. 1837	The memorial is in the churchyard of St George's Church, and is to the memory of two members of the Langford family. It is a pedestal tomb in sandstone, and has a plain plinth, sunken panels with double incised borders, corner Tuscan columns, and a plain top.	II
Oakes Memorial; 52.41885°N 3.03025°W	—	c. 1837	The memorial is in the churchyard of St George's Church, and is to the memory of John Beaumont Oakes. It is a chest tomb in sandstone, and has a chamfered plinth, sunken panels with carved radial-fan corners, partly fluted corner piers and a plain top.	II
10 Bridge Street and outbuilding 52.42069°N 3.03052°W		c. 1840	The cottage is in limestone with a slate roof and has one storey and an attic. The gable at the front has pierced and scalloped bargeboards and a finial. On the east front is a gabled half-dormer, and elsewhere are casement windows with hood moulds.	II
Brown Morgan Memorial; 52.41873°N 3.03087°W	—	c. 1840	The memorial is in the churchyard of St George's Church, and is to the memory of Thomas Brown Morgan. It is a chest tomb in sandstone, and has a chamfered plinth, sunken panels; corner Tuscan columns, and a chamfered top.	II
Meyrick Memorial; 52.41859°N 3.03057°W	—	c. 1840	The memorial is in the churchyard of St George's Church, and is to the memory of Richard Meyrick. It is a sandstone headstone, and has two shallow panels containing Gothic tracery.	II
St Mary's Church; 52.38091°N 3.00633°W		1844	The church, designed by Edward Haycock, is in limestone, rendered at the east end, shingled at the west end, and with a slate roof. It consists of a nave with a southwest porch and a northeast vestry, and a polygonal apse. On the west gable is a bellcote, and the windows are lancets.	II
Tilley Memorial; 52.41866°N 3.03050°W	—	c. 1845	The memorial is in the churchyard of St George's Church, and is to the memory of two members of the Tilley family. It is a chest tomb in sandstone, and has a chamfered plinth, sunken panels, corner piers with shallow trefoil-headed panels, and a chamfered top.	II
Bright Memorial; 52.41863°N 3.03063°W	—	c. 1848	The memorial is in the churchyard of St George's Church, and is to the memory of Charles Bright. It is a chest tomb in sandstone, and has a moulded plinth, sunken panels, corner piers with shallow Gothic panels and carved foliage decoration, and moulding to the chamfered top.	II
Brown Memorial; 52.41860°N 3.03057°W	—	Mid 19th century	The memorial is in the churchyard of St George's Church, and is to the memory of two members of the Brown family. It is a chest tomb in sandstone, and has a chamfered base, sunken panels, reeded corner piers, and a chamfered top.	II
Davies Memorial; 52.41873°N 3.03081°W	—	Mid 19th century	The memorial is in the churchyard of St George's Church, and is to the memory of Ann Davies. It is a chest tomb in sandstone, and has a chamfered plinth, raised panels, shaped reeded balusters on the corners and sides, a chevron-decorated frieze, and a chamfered top.	II
Hurst and Pentrenant Vault; 52.41824°N 3.03062°W	—	Mid 19th century	The vault is in the churchyard of St George's Church for members of the Hurst and Pentrenant families. It is in limestone and has a gabled slab roof at ground level with a moulded ridge and trefoil-pierced gable ends. The vault is in an enclosure with cast iron railings.	II
Turnpike Cottage; 52.42127°N 3.02552°W	—	Mid 19th century	The cottage was extended to the rear in the 20th century. It is in limestone with a slate roof, one storey with an attic, three bays, and a single-storey extension to the right containing a doorway. The windows are casements, and there are two gabled eaves dormers.	II
Gardener's Cottage and House, Trinity Hospital; 52.42307°N 3.02646°W	—	c. 1857	Two limestone houses, partly rendered, with some shingling, and slate roofs. They have two storeys and a T-shaped plan. The windows are casements.	II
Warden's House and Chapel, Trinity Hospital; 52.42311°N 3.02589°W	—	1857	The buildings are in limestone with tile roofs, and consist of an L-shaped house and a chapel to the south. The house has one storey and an attic, and has a four-bay arcaded loggia, casement windows, and two gabled half-dormers. The chapel has lancet windows and a gabled bellcote.	II*
9 Woodside; 52.41312°N 3.01491°W	—	Mid to late 19th century	The house, which was extended in the 20th century, is in limestone with a slate roof. These are two storeys, an original range of two bays, with the extension recessed on the right. There is a gabled wooden porch to the left, and the windows are casements with decorative glazing.	II
Former Malt House; 52.42137°N 3.02873°W		Mid to late 19th century	The malt house has been converted for other uses. It is in limestone with some red brick dressings and a slate roof. There are two storeys, and steps lead up to an upper floor doorway.	II
Milestone near Colstey Farm; 52.44826°N 3.03053°W	—	Mid to late 19th century	The milestone is on the west side of the A488 road, and consists of a round-headed stone. It is inscribed with the distances in miles to Bishop's Castle, to Clun, and to Knighton.	II
Milestone near Blackwell Cottage; 52.43450°N 3.03576°W	—	Mid to late 19th century	The milestone is on the west side of the A488 road, and consists of a round-headed stone. It is inscribed with the distances in miles to Bishop's Castle, to Clun, and to Knighton.	II
Milestone near Old Vicarage; 52.42129°N 3.02940°W	—	Mid to late 19th century	The milestone is at the junction of Bridge Street and High Street, and consists of a round-headed stone. It is inscribed with the distances in miles to Bishop's Castle, and to Knighton.	II
Milestone near Lower Rockhill Farmhouse; 52.40998°N 3.04213°W	—	Mid to late 19th century	The milestone is on the west side of the A488 road, and consists of a round-headed stone. It is inscribed with the distances in miles to Bishop's Castle, to Clun, and to Knighton.	II
Milestone at SO 2899 7820; 52.39700°N 3.04487°W	—	Mid to late 19th century	The milestone is on the west side of the A488 road, and consists of a round-headed stone. It is inscribed with the distances in miles to Bishop's Castle, to Clun, and to Knighton.	II
Milestone near Green Shutters; 52.37186°N 3.05018°W	—	Mid to late 19th century	The milestone is on the west side of the A488 road, and consists of a round-headed stone. It is inscribed with the distances in miles to Bishop's Castle, to Clun, and to Knighton.	II
Milestone near Walkmill Cottages; 52.42465°N 3.01173°W	—	Mid to late 19th century (probable)	The milestone is on the north side of the B4368 road, and consists of a round-headed stone. It is inscribed with the distances in miles to Clun, and to Craven Arms.	II
Owens Memorial; 52.41893°N 3.03021°W	—	Mid to late 19th century	The memorial is in the churchyard of St George's Church, and is to the memory of members of the Owens family. It is a chest tomb in sandstone, and has a chamfered plinth, sunken panels, reeded corner piers, and a chamfered top.	II
Gate piers, St George's Church; 52.41865°N 3.03090°W	—	c. 1877	The gate piers are at an entrance to the churchyard and probably contain some medieval material. They are in limestone and sandstone. Each gate pier has a square plan, it is about 1.5 metres (4 ft 11 in) high, and has a chamfered cap. To the east are two carved medieval sandstone heads.	II
War Memorial; 52.41906°N 3.03026°W		1921	The war memorial is adjacent to the entry to the churchyard of St George's Church, and consists of a cross in Cornish granite. Plaques flanked by buttresses in local stone are set into the churchyard wall. and behind them are a plinth, a square base with a moulded top, and a tapering octagonal shaft surmounted by a cross with a circular boss and a crown finial. The main plaque has an inscription and the names of those lost in the First World War, and below it are smaller plaques with the names of those lost in the Second World War and later conflicts.	II
Telephone kiosk, Chapel Lawn; 52.38056°N 3.00601°W		1935	A K6 type telephone kiosk, designed by Giles Gilbert Scott. Constructed in cast iron with a square plan and a dome, it has three unperforated crowns in the top panels.	II
Telephone kiosk, Clun; 52.42142°N 3.02980°W		1935	A K6 type telephone kiosk, designed by Giles Gilbert Scott. Constructed in cast iron with a square plan and a dome, it has three unperforated crowns in the top panels.	II

== Notes and references ==
=== Sources ===
- Historic England, "Remains of Clun Castle, Clun (1295475)", National Heritage List for England
- Historic England, "Clun Castle: a motte and bailey castle and formal garden earthworks, Clun (1011021)", National Heritage List for England
- Historic England, "Church of St. George, Clun (1367257)", National Heritage List for England
- Historic England, "Nos. 17 and 19 High Street, Clun (1308188)", National Heritage List for England
- Historic England, "Bryncambric Farmhouse, Clun (1096107)", National Heritage List for England
- Historic England, "Castle Cottage, Clun (1175080)", National Heritage List for England
- Historic England, "Clun Bridge, Clun (1054499)", National Heritage List for England
- Historic England, "Llynaven and former stable adjoining to East, Clun (1054484)", National Heritage List for England
- Historic England, "Former House approximately 120 metres to South-east of Lower Hodre, Clun (1367275)", National Heritage List for England
- Historic England, "Nos. 1–7 Church Street, Clun (1054467)", National Heritage List for England
- Historic England, "Sun Inn, Clun (1054453)", National Heritage List for England
- Historic England, "Little Hobarris Farmhouse and adjoining Outbuilding, Clun (1175834)", National Heritage List for England
- Historic England, "Nos. 1–3 Little Hospital, Clun (1175919)", National Heritage List for England
- Historic England, "Bryn Farmhouse, Clun (1175035)", National Heritage List for England
- Historic England, "No. 5 Guilden Down and attached former Cowhouse to South, Clun (1367248)", National Heritage List for England
- Historic England, "No. 11 High Street, Clun (1308217)", National Heritage List for England
- Historic England, "Field Farmhouse, Clun (1054424)", National Heritage List for England
- Historic England, "Clun Farmhouse, Clun (1175722)", National Heritage List for England
- Historic England, "Guilden Down Farmhouse, Clun (1054448)", National Heritage List for England
- Historic England, "Weston Farmhouse, Clun (1367226)", National Heritage List for England
- Historic England, "No. 6 Bridge Street, Clun (1175013)", National Heritage List for England
- Historic England, "Trinity Hospital, Clun (1054455)", National Heritage List for England
- Historic England, "Bryn Cottage and garages adjoining to South-west, Clun (1054502)", National Heritage List for England
- Historic England, "Colesty Farmhouse and Cottage adjoining to South-west, Clun (1367245)", National Heritage List for England
- Historic England, "Former House approximately 15 metres to North-east of Squire Farmhouse, Clun (1367225)", National Heritage List for England
- Historic England, "Pen-Y-Wern, Clun (1412415)", National Heritage List for England
- Historic England, "Nos. 2 (Bridge House) and 4 Street, Clun (1367256)", National Heritage List for England
- Historic England, "Stables and barn approximately 10 metres to South-west of Bicton Farmhouse, Clun (1054495)", National Heritage List for England
- Historic England, "Bryn House, Clun (1054501)", National Heritage List for England
- Historic England, "Barn and cowhouses approximately 10 metres to South-west of Bryn Farmhouse, Clun (1054500)", National Heritage List for England
- Historic England, "Castle Farmhouse, Clun (1367255)", National Heritage List for England
- Historic England, "Former house approximately 10 metres to South-east of North-easterly Chapel Lawn Farmhouse, Clun (1054505)", National Heritage List for England
- Historic England, "The South-westerly Chapel Lawn Farmhouse at SO 3163 7626, Clun (1054463)", National Heritage List for England
- Historic England, "Cwm Colstey, Clun (1054444)", National Heritage List for England
- Historic England, "Farmbuildings approximately 10 metres to North and West of Leasowes Farmhouse, Clun (1054494)", National Heritage List for England
- Historic England, "Little Bicton, Clun (1367230)", National Heritage List for England
- Historic England, "Barn approximately 10 metres to North of Little Hall Farmhouse, Clun (1054492)", National Heritage List for England
- Historic England, "Barn approximately 25 metres to North-east of Little Hobarris Farmhouse, Clun (1054454)", National Heritage List for England
- Historic England, "Lower Hodre, Clun (1054423)", National Heritage List for England
- Historic England, "Old Stone Cottage, Clun (1054447)", National Heritage List for England
- Historic England, "Ship House, Clun (1308254)", National Heritage List for England
- Historic England, "Barn and Cowhouse adjoining Squire Farmhouse to North-west, Clun (1054487)", National Heritage List for England
- Historic England, "Sun Inn, Clun (1175802)", National Heritage List for England
- Historic England, "The Buffalo Hotel and 68 Former Barn adjoining to the West, Clun (1367276)", National Heritage List for England
- Historic England, "The Quern, Clun (1367263)", National Heritage List for England
- Historic England, "The Rhoneth, Clun (1176105)", National Heritage List for England
- Historic England, "Boundary wall, Gatepiers, Gates and Former Mortuary to Trinity Hospital, Clun (1054457)", National Heritage List for England
- Historic England, "Barn adjoining Upper Farmhouse to West, Clun (1054449)", National Heritage List for England
- Historic England, "Barn, Cowhouse and Stables approximately 10 metres to East of Whitcott Hall, Clun (1054430)", National Heritage List for England
- Historic England, "No. 14 High Street, Clun (1367251)", National Heritage List for England
- Historic England, "Nos. 4 and 5 Little Hospital, Clun (1054459)", National Heritage List for England
- Historic England, "The Vicarage, Clun (1176091)", National Heritage List for England
- Historic England, "Lower House, Clun (1367250)", National Heritage List for England
- Historic England, "Walkmill Cottages, Clun (1308257)", National Heritage List for England
- Historic England, "No. 4 Bicton, Clun (1174957)", National Heritage List for England
- Historic England, "Bicton Farmhouse, Clun (1174965)", National Heritage List for England
- Historic England, "Barn approximately 10 metres to North of Whitcott Evan Farmhouse, Clun (1295525)", National Heritage List for England
- Historic England, "No. 3 High Street and attached Outbuilding to West, Clun (1054450)", National Heritage List for England
- Historic England, "Nos. 6 and 8 Church Street, Clun (1175253)", National Heritage List for England
- Historic England, "Lychgate approximately metres to North of Church of St George, Clun (1054471)", National Heritage List for England
- Historic England, "Wells Farmhouse and adjoining Cowhouses, Clun (1175595)", National Heritage List for England
- Historic England, "Barn and Cowhouse approximately 35 metres to South-east of Bicton Farmhouse, Clun (1174975)", National Heritage List for England
- Historic England, "Outbuilding approximately 10 metres to West of Castle Cottage, Clun (1054503)", National Heritage List for England
- Historic England, "Range of Cowhouses approximately 20 metres to North of Colesty Farmhouse, Clun (1367246)", National Heritage List for England
- Historic England, "Sundial approximately 4 metres to South of South-westerly Chapel Lawn Farmhouse, Clun (1367253)", National Heritage List for England
- Historic England, "Crown House, Clun (1054470)", National Heritage List for England
- Historic England, "Whitcott Hall, Clun (1176250)", National Heritage List for England
- Historic England, "Acton House, Clun (1054458)", National Heritage List for England
- Historic England, "Chest Tomb approximately 10 metres to North of North Porch of Church of St George, Clun (1367244)", National Heritage List for England
- Historic England, "St Catherines, Clun (1054451)", National Heritage List for England
- Historic England, "The Old Vicarage and railed enclosure to North-west, Clun (1054496)", National Heritage List for England
- Historic England, "Jones Memorial approximately 5 metres to North of North Porch of Church of St George, Clun (1054478)", National Heritage List for England
- Historic England, "Jones Memorial approximately 38 metres to North of North Aisle of Church of St George, Clun (1175410)", National Heritage List for England
- Historic England, "Outbuilding adjoining The Old Vicarage to South-west, Clun (1295511)", National Heritage List for England
- Historic England, "Villa Farmhouse, Clun (1054504)", National Heritage List for England
- Historic England, "Clun Museum, Clun (1054426)", National Heritage List for England
- Historic England, "Edwards Memorial approximately 13 metres to North of North Porch of Church of St George, Clun (1295319)", National Heritage List for England
- Historic England, "Bryncalled Farmhouse, Clun (1054522)", National Heritage List for England
- Historic England, "Farmbuildings to north-west of Bryncalled Farmhouse, Clun (1054404)", National Heritage List for England
- Historic England, "Lake House, Clun (1054461)", National Heritage List for England
- Historic England, "No. 4 Bridge Street, Clun (1367232)", National Heritage List for England
- Historic England, "No. 8 Bridge Street, Clun (1054498)", National Heritage List for England
- Historic England, "Stable or cowhouse approximately 10 metres to North-east of Bryn Farmhouse, Clun (1175051)", National Heritage List for England
- Historic England, "Barn and Cowhouse approximately 15 metres to North of South-westerly Chapel Lawn Farmhouse, Clun (1367252)", National Heritage List for England
- Historic England, "Ford House, Clun (1367247)", National Heritage List for England
- Historic England, "Cowhouse approximately 5 metres to South of Guilden Down Farmhouse, Clun (1308224)", National Heritage List for England
- Historic England, "Jones Memorial approximately 9 metres to North of North Aisle of Church of St George, Clun (1054476)", National Heritage List for England
- Historic England, "Jones Memorial approximately 26 metres to North of North Aisle of Church of St George, Clun (1054477)", National Heritage List for England
- Historic England, "Little Hall Farmhouse, Clun (1295541)", National Heritage List for England
- Historic England, "Former stables and coach house approximately 20 metres to South-west of The Old Vicarage, Clun (1367231)", National Heritage List for England
- Historic England, "Rutton Memorial approximately 3 metres to North of North Porch of Church of St George, Clun (1175459)", National Heritage List for England
- Historic England, "Lankey Memorial approximately 16 metres to North of North Porch of Church of St George, Clun (1054479)", National Heritage List for England
- Historic England, "Shadwell Hall, Clun (1054486)", National Heritage List for England
- Historic England, "Farmbuildings approximately 40 metres to South-west of Shadwell Hall, Clun (1367224)", National Heritage List for England
- Historic England, "The Hurst, Clun (1174637)", National Heritage List for England
- Historic England, "Gwilliam Memorial approximately 24 metres to North of North Aisle of Church of St George, Clun (1367260)", National Heritage List for England
- Historic England, "Hamar Memorial approximately 14 metres to North of North Aisle of Church of St George, Clun (1175390)", National Heritage List for England
- Historic England, "No. 13 Church Street, Clun (1054468)", National Heritage List for England
- Historic England, "Nos. 23 and 25 High Street, Clun (1054452)", National Heritage List for England
- Historic England, "Brown Memorial approximately 24 metres to North of North Aisle of Church of St George, Clun (1367258)", National Heritage List for England
- Historic England, "Cowhouses and former malt-house approximately 5 metres to North-east South-westerly Chapel Lawn Farmhouse, Clun (1054464)", National Heritage List for England
- Historic England, "Clun Mill, Clun (1054460)", National Heritage List for England
- Historic England, "Pentre Farmhouse, Clun (1054421)", National Heritage List for England
- Historic England, "Barn and Cowhouse approximately 15 metres to North of Pentre Farmhouse, Clun (1367274)", National Heritage List for England
- Historic England, "Cowhouse approximately 15 metres to North-west of Pentre Farmhouse, Clun (1054422)", National Heritage List for England
- Historic England, "Dovecote approximately 180 metres to South-East of The Hurst, Clun (1054526)", National Heritage List for England
- Historic England, "Stable block approximately 50 metres to South-East of The Hurst, Clun (1054497)", National Heritage List for England
- Historic England, "Chest Tomb approximately 18 metres to North of North Aisle of Church of St George, Clun (1054442)", National Heritage List for England
- Historic England, "Chest Tomb approximately 23 metres to North of North Aisle of Church of St George, Clun (1367283)", National Heritage List for England
- Historic England, "Chest Tomb approximately 8 metres to North-west of North Porch of Church of St George, Clun (1054443)", National Heritage List for England
- Historic England, "Wellings Memorial approximately 29 metres to North of North Aisle of Church of St George, Clun (1054441)", National Heritage List for England
- Historic England, "Waterloo House and Barn, Clun (1457606)", National Heritage List for England
- Historic England, "Luther Memorial approximately 31 metres to North of North Aisle of Church of St George, Clun (1054480)", National Heritage List for England
- Historic England, "Hamar Memorial approximately 10 metres to North of North Aisle of Church of St George, Clun (1175380)", National Heritage List for England
- Historic England, "Stable block and coach house approximately 100 metres to South-East of The Hurst, Clun (1295673)", National Heritage List for England
- Historic England, "Wellings Memorial approximately 15 metres to North of North Aisle of Church of St George, Clun (1367282)", National Heritage List for England
- Historic England, "Hamar Memorial approximately 13 metres to North of North Aisle of Church of St George, Clun (1054475)", National Heritage List for England
- Historic England, "Haynes Memorial approximately 30 metres to North of North Porch of Church of St George, Clun (1367261)", National Heritage List for England
- Historic England, "No. 2 Bridge Street, Clun (1295514)", National Heritage List for England
- Historic England, "No. 10 Church Street, Clun (1054469)", National Heritage List for England
- Historic England, "Nos. 10, 12 (The White Horse Inn) and 14 The Square, Clun (1054425)", National Heritage List for England
- Historic England, "Brown Memorial approximately 18 metres to North of North Porch of Church of St George, Clun (1175333)", National Heritage List for England
- Historic England, "Caradoc House and coach house adjoining to left, Clun (1175233)", National Heritage List for England
- Historic England, "Edwards Memorial approximately 5 metres to North-west of North Porch of Church of St George, Clun (1054474)", National Heritage List for England
- Historic England, "Edwards Memorial approximately 14 metres to North of North Porch of Church of St George, Clun (1367259)", National Heritage List for England
- Historic England, "Gough Memorial approximately 7 metres to North-west of North Porch of Church of St George, Clun (1175379)", National Heritage List for England
- Historic England, "Harpton House and Shop adjoining to West, Claverley (1308104)", National Heritage List for England
- Historic England, "Laurel Cottage, Clun (1175845)", National Heritage List for England
- Historic England, "Luther Memorial approximately 27 metres to North of North Aisle of Church of St George, Clun (1308349)", National Heritage List for England
- Historic England, "Parry Memorial approximately 20 metres to North of North Aisle of Church of St George, Clun (1054483)", National Heritage List for England
- Historic England, "Parry Memorial and Dislodged Finial approximately 19 metres to North of North Aisle of Church of St George, Clun (1308322)", National Heritage List for England
- Historic England, "Former Coach House and Stables approximately 10 metres to South-east of The Vicarage, Clun (1367277)", National Heritage List for England
- Historic England, "Langford Memorial approximately 19 metres to North of North Aisle of Church of St George, Clun (1175417)", National Heritage List for England
- Historic England, "Oakes Memorial approximately 21 metres to North of North Aisle of Church of St George, Clun (1054481)", National Heritage List for England
- Historic England, "No. 10 Bridge Street and outbuilding adjoining to North-west, Clun (1175022)", National Heritage List for England
- Historic England, "No. 12 Bridge Street, Clun (1295359)", National Heritage List for England
- Historic England, "Brown Morgan Memorial approximately 30 metres to North-west of North Porch of Church of St George, Clun (1175340)", National Heritage List for England
- Historic England, "Meyrick Memorial approximately 19 metres to West of Porch of Church of St George, Clun (1175438)", National Heritage List for England
- Historic England, "Church of St. Mary, Clun (1175111)", National Heritage List for England
- Historic England, "Tilley Memorial approximately 5 metres to North-west of North Porch of Church of St George, Clun (1367262)", National Heritage List for England
- Historic England, "Bight Memorial approximately 9 metres to West of North Porch of Church of St George, Clun (1175317)", National Heritage List for England
- Historic England, "Brown Memorial approximately 29 metres to West of North Aisle of Church of St George, Clun (1054472)", National Heritage List for England
- Historic England, "Davies Memorial approximately 28 metres to North-west of North Porch of Church of St George, Clun (1054473)", National Heritage List for England
- Historic England, "Hurst and Pentrenant Vault with Railed Enclosure approximately 20 metres to South-west of Tower of Church of St George, Clun (1175401)", National Heritage List for England
- Historic England, "Turnpike Cottage, Clun (1175693)", National Heritage List for England
- Historic England, "Gardener's Cottage and House to North adjoining Trinity Hospital to South-west, Clun (1175878)", National Heritage List for England
- Historic England, "Warden's House and Chapel adjoining Trinity Hospital at South-east corner, Clun (1054456)", National Heritage List for England
- Historic England, "No. 9 Woodside, Clun (1176258)", National Heritage List for England
- Historic England, "Former Malt-house adjoining No. 14 High Street to East, Clun (1175823)", National Heritage List for England
- Historic England, "Milestone approximately 150 metres to North-west of Colstey Farmhouse, Clun (1054445)", National Heritage List for England
- Historic England, "Milestone approximately 160 metres to North of Blackwell Cottage, Clun (1367227)", National Heritage List for England
- Historic England, "Milestone approximately 10 metres to North-west of The Old Vicarage, Clun (1054497)", National Heritage List for England
- Historic England, "Milestone approximately 35 metres to North-west of Lower Rockhill Farmhouse, Clun (1174858)", National Heritage List for England
- Historic England, "Milestone at SO 2899 7820, Clun (1054490)", National Heritage List for England
- Historic England, "Milestone approximately 225 metres to North-west of Green Shutters, Clun (1295559)", National Heritage List for England
- Historic England, "Milestone approximately 360 metres to North-east of Nos. 1 and 2, Walkmill Cottages, Clun (1174907)", National Heritage List for England
- Historic England, "Owens Memorial approximately 26 metres to North of North Porch of Church of St George, Clun (1054482)", National Heritage List for England
- Historic England, "Pair of Gatepiers approximately 32 metres to East of Church of St George, Clun (1175900)", National Heritage List for England
- Historic England, "Clun War Memorial, Clun (1444412)", National Heritage List for England
- Historic England, "K6 Telephone Kiosk, Chapel Lawn, Clun (1054942)", National Heritage List for England
- Historic England, "K6 Telephone Kiosk, The Square, Clun (1054403)", National Heritage List for England
- Historic England, Listed Buildings
- Newman, John; Pevsner, Nikolaus (2006), Shropshire, The Buildings of England, New Haven and London: Yale University Press, ISBN 0-300-12083-4
