= Clun Town Hall =

Municipal building in Shropshire, England

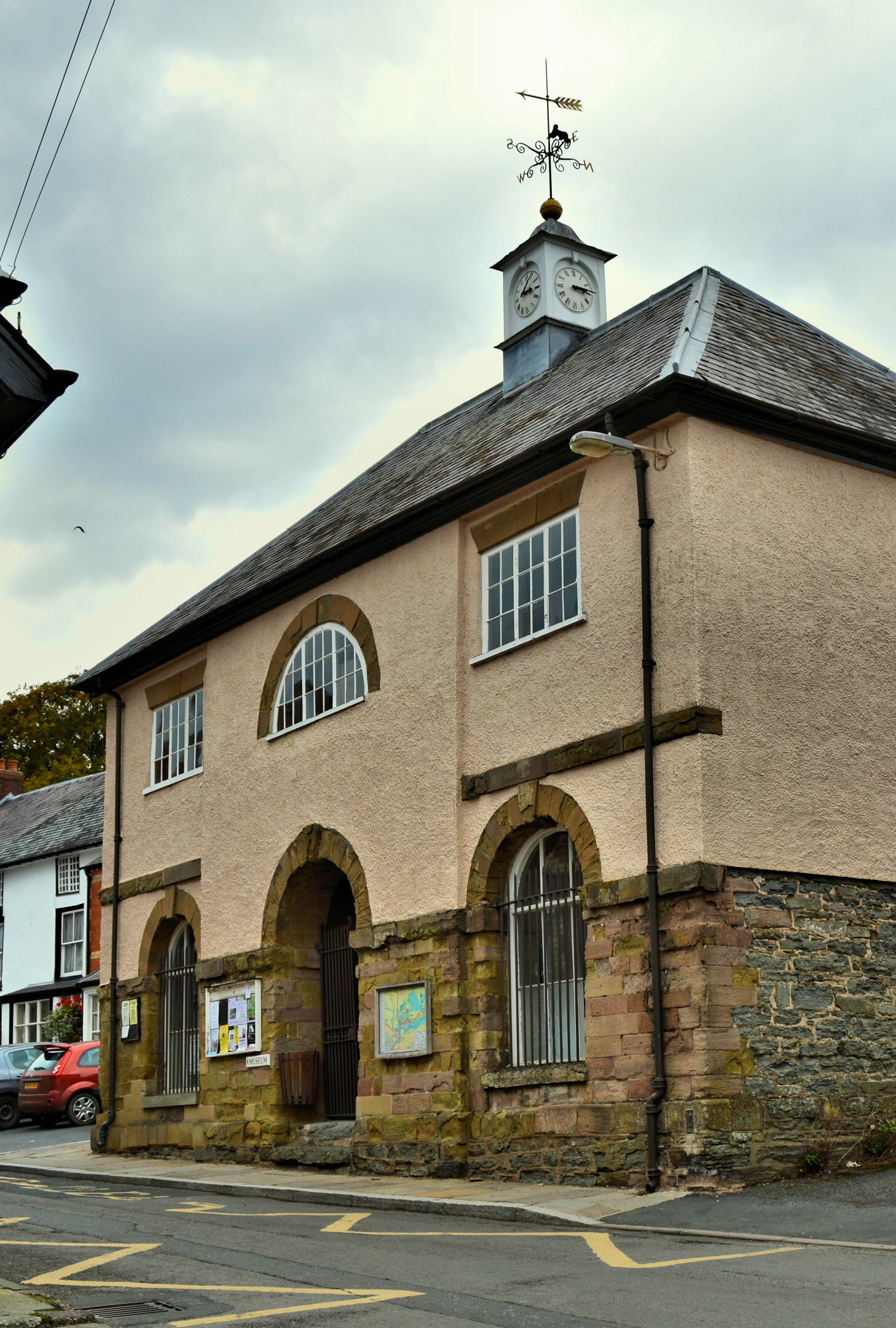
- Clun Town Hall

- Shown in Shropshire
- 52.4214°N 3.0297°W
- Location: The Square, Clun

History
- Built: 1780

Site notes
- Architectural style: Neoclassical style

Listed Building – Grade II*
- Official name: Clun Museum
- Designated: 1 December 1951
- Reference no.: 1054426

Clun Town Hall is a municipal building in The Square in Clun, Shropshire, England. The building, which is now used as a museum, is a Grade II* listed building.

== History ==
=== The building ===
The first municipal building in the town was a medieval courthouse adjoining Clun Castle which dated back to the early 16th century. In the 1770s, the new lord of the manor, Edward Clive, 2nd Lord Clive, decided to replace the structure, which contained both the manorial court and the borough court, amidst some criticism, not least because the manorial court had been left to deteriorate by successive lords of the manor while the borough court had been well maintained by the borough council.

The new building was designed in the neoclassical style, built in limestone rubble masonry and was completed in 1780. The design involved a symmetrical main frontage with three bays facing onto The Square; there were three round headed openings with architraves and keystones on the ground floor. The central bay, which slightly projected forward, featured a Diocletian window on the first floor, while the outer bays were fenestrated by casement windows on that floor. Originally, the central bay was surmounted by a gable containing a carved stone panel bearing the Powis coat of arms and the date of completion, MDCCLXXX (1780). At roof level, there was a wooden cupola with clock faces, an ogee-shaped dome, a finial and a weather vane. Internally, the principal rooms were the market hall on the ground floor and an assembly room on the first floor. A lock up for petty criminals was also established on the ground floor.

In the late-19th century, the gable in the central bay was demolished and the stone panel was transferred to the wall on the western side. At about the same time, the openings in the outer bays on the ground floor were infilled with windows and fitted with iron bars. The borough council, which had met in the town hall, was abolished under the Municipal Corporations Act 1883. Following the implementation of the Local Government Act 1894, which established elected parish councils in rural areas, the assembly room became the meeting place of Clun Parish Council. After the markets moved from Clun to other towns in the 1920s, George Herbert, 4th Earl of Powis presented the town hall to the parish in 1928 and the former market hall on the ground floor was converted into a museum in 1932. The assembly room continued to be used for magistrates' court hearings until 1949. A major programme of restoration works, carried out with funding from English Heritage, which included the creation of a new main entrance on the western side of the building, was completed in the 1990s.

=== The museum ===
The museum, established in 1932 on the ground floor of the town hall, doubled its floor area when it expanded onto the first floor in 2004. It contains a collection of some 6,000 ancient tools many of which were found on a local hillside, Caer Caradoc, and date back to the Mesolithic period. There are also artefacts relating to the former borough of Clun, including two ceremonial maces which date back to the Elizabethan era.

== See also ==
- Grade II* listed buildings in Shropshire Council (A–G)
- Listed buildings in Clun
