= New Invention, Shropshire =

Hamlet in Shropshire, England

Coordinates: 52.383°N 3.038°W

New Invention
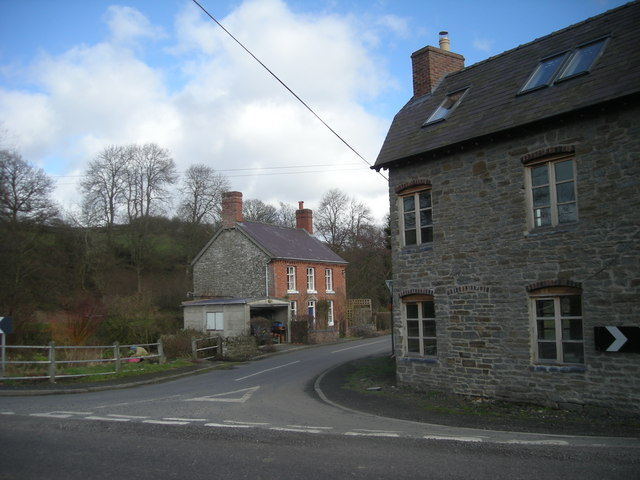
- Houses at New Invention

- Location within Shropshire
- OS grid reference: SO293766
- Civil parish: Clun
- Unitary authority: Shropshire
- Ceremonial county: Shropshire
- Region: West Midlands
- Country: England
- Sovereign state: United Kingdom
- Post town: BUCKNELL
- Postcode district: SY7
- Dialling code: 01547
- Police: West Mercia
- Fire: Shropshire
- Ambulance: West Midlands
- UK Parliament: Ludlow

New Invention is a hamlet in Shropshire, England on the A488 between Clun and Knighton. It comprises little more than four houses around a cross-roads and a neighbouring farm called The Weir, known in history as the Wear or Ware. Of the four houses, one was a blacksmith's shop, one a pub called the Stag's Head, and one a Methodist chapel built in 1874. It served as one of many local locations for the film Gone to Earth (released 1950), directed by Michael Powell and Emeric Pressburger. The River Redlake passes through. The population as of the 2011 census is listed under Clun.

== Name ==
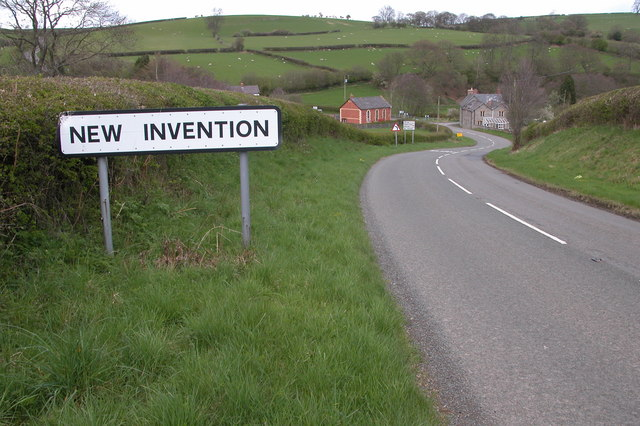
Village sign.

There is a story that the hamlet's unusual name came from a local farrier who decided on the idea of fitting horseshoes backwards to confuse the enemy in times of war. A variation of this story is that the farrier reversed the shoes on the horse belonging to Charles I to help him evade capture. A slightly more credible explanation is that the village was the first in the district where spinning was carried out using water power, but this theory can almost certainly be discredited by the fact that the earliest known reference to New Invention is in a document held at Shropshire Archives dated 1677 (ref 2589/D/108), while machinery for carding and spinning wool was not invented until well into the 18th century. Fulling mills, which cleaned and thickened wool, were powered by water in medieval times and there are records of at least two in Clun, so this possibility can not be entirely discounted.

The brief description on Shropshire Archives' website is as follows:

1. Jonathan Page of Parllogue, p. Clunne, gent. 2. Daniel Bee of Cardington, Clerke. Of Capital messuage and tenement in Parllogue in p. CLUNNE, in tenure of (1); also of messuage and tenement called the New hall in t. Menuttin, p. CLUNNE, in tenure of Thomas Warburton of Menuttin, gent.; also of that new house called the New Invention, lately built upon parcell of the land belonging to ... the New hall; also of water corne Grist mill, near and belonging to the said New Hall.
