= Isabella de Say =

Anglo-Norman noblewoman

Isabella de Say (c. 1132 – 1199) was an Anglo-Norman heiress. Isabella was the only surviving child of Helias de Say upon his death in 1165; Helias was the third lord of Clun, a powerful Norman stronghold in Shropshire, England, along the Welsh border. She is notable for helping to create the powerful medieval house of the FitzAlans. Isabella married William FitzAlan, the lord of nearby Oswestry, as his second wife in 1156. William died in 1160, leaving a son by his first wife, Christiana, William FitzAlan II. Isabella passed Clun Castle to him. The combined lordship of Oswestry and Clun was a significant power in the borderlands with Wales.

Isabella had married Geoffrey de Vere II, brother of the earl of Oxford by early 1166. After de Vere's death in 1170 she married William Boterel, probably by 1175, the year her stepson William reached his majority. She was certainly married to him by 1188. Isabella's death date is disputed, but she probably lived to 1199.

A charter of Isabella's to Wenlock Priory in Shropshire, purportedly issued on her deathbed, granted the church and chapels of Clun to that monastery. Her grant was confirmed by her third husband William Boterel.

== Bibliography ==
- Brown, Reginald Allen. (1989) Castles from the Air. Cambridge, UK: Cambridge University Press. ISBN 978-0-521-32932-3.
- Dugdale, William, Caley, John, Ellis, Henry, Bandienl, Bulkeley (1819) Monasticon Anglicanum vol. 5
- Eyton, William. (1860) Antiquities of Shropshire, Volume XI. London: John Russell Smith.
- Eyton, William. (1862) "The Castles of Shropshire and its Border." in Collectanea Archæologica: communications made to the British Archaeological Association Vol. 1. London: Longman.
