= De Say =

Norman noble family

Adopted arms of de Say. Quarterly, or and gules

de Say (Saye, Sai) is the surname of an old Norman noble family originating from Sai, Orne. The first records are about William de Say and Picot de Say, Norman conquerors. The de Say family, held lands in England and France.

Once settled and rewarded for their part in the Norman invasion of 1066, it is recorded their family name was anglicised to de Jay. This then became the surname Jay as we know it today.

Historical records note that, just as in their Norman roots in Sai, France; the hamlet of Jay, in Shropshire, was taken as their name.

This area was within the Barony of Clun, a powerful Norman stronghold in Shropshire. Whilst the name of De Say/De Sai evolved to become De Jay/Jay, branches of the House of De Say became linked to the Duke of Norfolk.

This occurred when Isabella de Say was born to Helias de Say/de Jay.

Isabella was the only surviving child of Helias de Say upon his death in 1165; Helias was the third lord of Clun.

She is notable for helping to create the powerful medieval house of the FitzAlans.

== French origin ==
The family descends from Picot Avenel de Say, a vassal of Robert I, Duke of Normandy. His son Robert Fitz-Picot, Lord of Aunay, was co-founder in 1060, of the abbey of St Martin at Séez.

== England ==
William and Robert de Say (also called Picot de Say) were the sons of Robert Fitz-Picot and his wife Adelaide. They accompanied William the Conqueror in 1066.

William de Say's descendants inherited the manor of West Greenwich, now known as Deptford, and adopted the Maminot arms, Quarterly, or and gules.

== Robert de Say ==
Robert de Say, also called Picot de Say, was a Norman knight who arrived in Shropshire after the Norman invasion. He was the son of Robert Fitz-Picot and his wife Adelaide of Normandy. The family name de Say comes from the Norman village of Sai, in Orne.

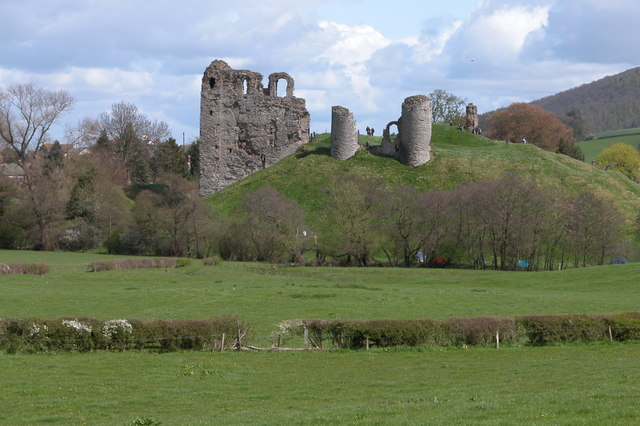
Clun Castle

Robert de Say obtained lands in Shropshire, building a motte and bailey castle, known as Clun Castle overlooking the lands he had seized from Edric the Wild after the invasion. Robert was an important vassal of Roger of Montgomery, the 1st Earl of Shrewsbury and a major early Norman magnate. Robert died in 1098.

His daughter married the local Welsh lord, Cadwgan ap Bleddyn, who acquired permission to move to England, probably Clun, in 1109. Upon Picot de Say's death in 1098, the castle passed to his son, Henry de Say, who continued possession of Clun Castle.

== See also ==
- Clan Seton
- Clun

== Sources ==
- Foxe, John (1854). The Church Historians of England: Reformation Period. Seeleys.
- Dunkin, Alfred John (1855). History of the County of Kent.

== Bibliography ==
- Brown, Reginald Allen. (1989) Castles From The Air. Cambridge: Cambridge University Press. ISBN 978-0-521-32932-3.
- Eyton, William. (1862) "The Castles of Shropshire and its Border." in Collectanea Archæologica: communications made to the British Archaeological Association Vol. 1. London: Longman.
- Liddiard, Robert. (ed) (2003) Anglo Norman Castles. Woodbridge: Boydell Press.
- Lieberman, Max. (2010) The Medieval March of Wales: The Creation and Perception of a Frontier, 1066-1283. Cambridge: Cambridge University Press. ISBN 978-0-521-76978-5.
- Pettifer, Adrian. (1995) English Castles: A Guide by Counties. Woodbridge: Boydell Press. ISBN 978-0-85115-782-5.
- Suppe, Frederick C. "Castle guard and the castlery of Clun," in Liddiard (ed) 2003.
