= William Burrough (cricketer) =

English cricketer

Personal information
- Full name: William George Burrough
- Born: 22 July 1875; Clun, Shropshire, England
- Died: 30 December 1939 (aged 64); Wedmore Hill House, Somerset, England
- Bowling: (unknown hand) Fast-medium

Domestic team information
- Years: Team
- 1906: Somerset

Career statistics
Competition	FC
Matches	4
Runs scored	40
Batting average	5.71
100s/50s	0/0
Top score	11
Balls bowled	546
Wickets	7
Bowling average	49.14
5 wickets in innings	0
10 wickets in match	0
Best bowling	2/102
Catches/stumpings	2/–
- Source: CricketArchive, 22 December 2015

William George Burrough (22 July 1875 – 30 December 1939) played first-class cricket for Somerset in four matches in the 1906 season. He was born in Clun, Shropshire, and died in Wedmore, Somerset.

== Personal life ==
Burrough was the third son of the Rev Charles Burrough and his wife, who was born Georgina B. Long. He himself married Lilian Pople in 1907. She died in 1919 and he then married Dorothy Tait in 1921. He had two sons and two daughters by his first marriage. He was a partner in the law firm of Burrough and Hutton in Wedmore.

== Cricket career ==
As a cricketer, Burrough was a fast-medium bowler and a lower-order batsman. He took four wickets in his first match, against Warwickshire at Edgbaston, but he only took three further wickets in his other three games. He batted at No 10 in each of his seven first-class innings in these four games, and had a top score of just 11.

Burrough had earlier played minor cricket for Herefordshire and for the Free Foresters amateur side.

His older brother John Burrough played first-class cricket for Cambridge University between 1893 and 1895, and William's son Dickie Burrough played 171 matches as a right-handed batsman for Somerset between 1927 and 1947. A nephew, the son of a different brother but also called John Burrough, played for Oxford University and Gloucestershire in the 1920s and 1930s.
