= Clun Bridge =

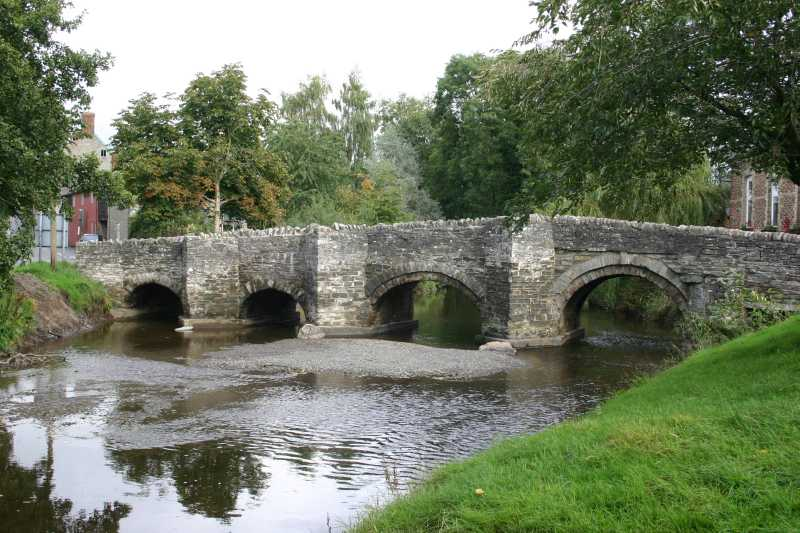
- Clun Bridge
- Coordinates: 52.4204°N 3.0303°W
- Carries: A488
- Crosses: River Clun
- Locale: Shropshire

Characteristics
- Design: Packhorse bridge
- Material: Stone
- Piers in water: 3

History
- Opened: 1450

Clun Bridge is a historical bridge in the small town of Clun, Shropshire, England dating from 1450 which crosses over the River Clun.

The bridge is still an important bridging point over the River Clun and carries the A488 and B4368 roads over it, despite being a stone packhorse bridge.

Alternatively, there is a ford to cross the River Clun at Clun. Recently the local authorities have been looking into an alternative route for the A488 main road through Clun, as neither the ford nor the ancient bridge are adequate in meeting the demands of modern heavy traffic. Satellite navigation systems used by some lorry drivers are making the problem worse, as they are currently directing traffic down the A488, without giving warning of the narrow bridge.

Some remedial work was carried out on the approaches to the bridge in 2006 to mitigate the effects of long and heavy vehicles using it. During the carrying out of these works there was much disruption in the wider area due to the closing of this important bridging point to traffic.

The bridge is at 594 feet (181 m) above sea level.

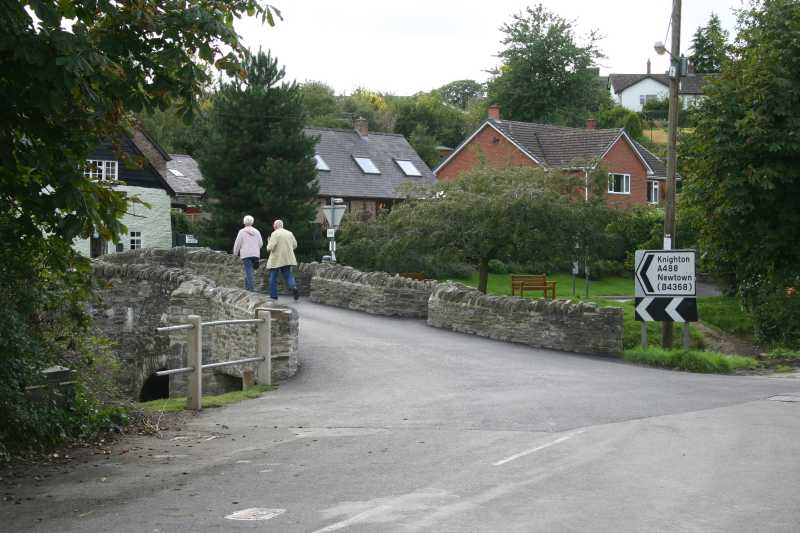
Clun Bridge is part of an 'A' classified route

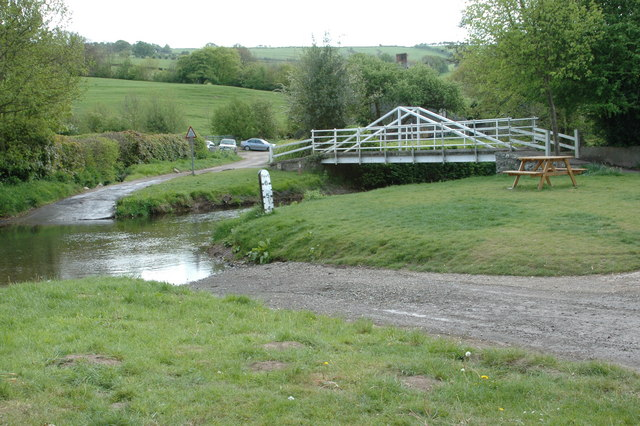
The nearby alternative — Waterloo Ford

== See also ==
- Grade II* listed buildings in Shropshire Council (A–G)
- Listed buildings in Clun
