= Henry de Say =

Anglo-Norman nobleman

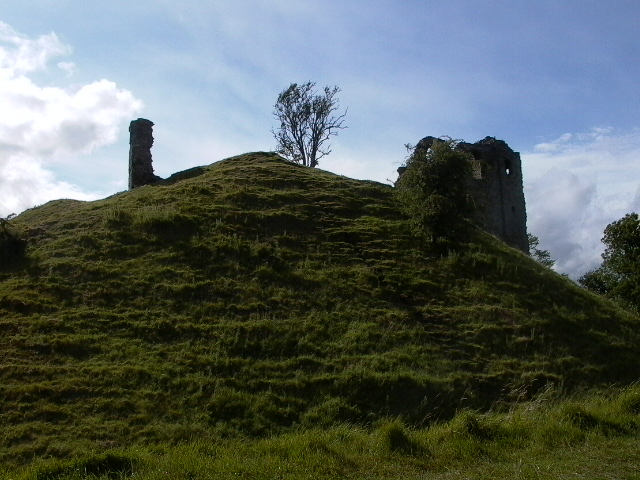
Clun Castle

Henry de Say was a Norman nobleman who lived in Clun in Shropshire, along the medieval Welsh Marches.

== Henry de Say ==
Henry de Say inherited the important fortification Clun Castle from his father, Robert de Say (also called Picot de Say), in 1098. Henry died some time after 1130. His son was Helias de Say.

== Helias de Say ==
Helias de Say (died 1165), also called "Hellias", was a Norman nobleman who lived in Clun, Shropshire, along the medieval Welsh Marches. He is believed to have inherited Clun Castle from his father, Henry de Say, in the reign of Henry I. Helias held the key fortification of Clun Castle during the years of the Anarchy. He was an important early benefactor of Haughmond Abbey. Upon his death, his only surviving child and heiress was Isabella de Say.

== Bibliography ==
- Eyton, William. (1860) Antiquities of Shropshire, Volume XI. London: John Russell Smith.
- Liddiard, Robert. (ed) (2003) Anglo Norman Castles. Woodbridge: Boydell Press.
- Suppe, Frederick C. "Castle guard and the castlery of Clun," in Liddiard (ed) 2003.
