= John Burrough (Cambridge University cricketer) =

English cricketer

John Burrough (5 September 1873 – 26 December 1922) was an English first-class cricketer who played in 24 matches for Cambridge University and various amateur teams, including sides put together by W. G. Grace, between 1893 and 1914.

Burrough was born in Clun, Shropshire, son of the Rev Charles Burrough and his wife, who was born Georgina B. Long, and educated at Bruton and Shrewsbury School, and Jesus College, Cambridge where he graduated B.A. in 1895 and M.A in 1899. He became a Church of England priest, ordained by the Bishop of Chester in 1898. He served as Curate at Witton, Cheshire 1896-1900, and chaplain at the Mersey Mission to Seamen in Liverpool 1900-03 and at the Royal Indian Engineering College in Cooper's Hill, Surrey 1903–06. In 1907 he became a Chaplain to the Forces and served at Cairo 1908-11, Hounslow 1911-19, including during the First World War, and at Shoeburyness 1919-21. He died aged 49 at St Leonards, East Sussex.

His younger brother William Burrough played first-class cricket for Somerset in 1906.
