= Clun and Chapel Lawn =

Civil parish in Shropshire, England

Coordinates: 52.420°N 3.030°W

Clun or Clun and Chapel Lawn (sometimes "Clun with Chapel Lawn") is a civil parish which covers a large rural area in the southwest of Shropshire, England. The parish has an area of 6,079 hectares (15,020 acres).

The parish council is formally called "Clun Town Council with Chapel Lawn" following a Governance Review in 2011/12 and a Resolution of the Council in May 2012. Prior to the Review, the parish's formal name was simply "Clun" and the parish council was "Clun and Chapel Lawn Parish Council".

The parish is divided into two parish wards: to the north is the larger ward of Clun (covering the historic town — and former borough — of Clun and the surrounding countryside), and to the south Chapel Lawn (covering the small village of Chapel Lawn and the surrounding countryside). Although it is smaller than many villages in terms of its built area and population, Clun is officially a town. It has an historic Town Hall (which is now a museum) and its council is presided over by a Town Mayor (the correct title for a chairman of a town council in England). It is currently (as of 2013) the smallest town in Shropshire.

The population of the civil parish was recorded in 2011 as 1,184.

The parish forms part of the Clun electoral division of Shropshire Council.
