= Clun =

Town in Shropshire, England

Coordinates: 52.4214°N 3.0297°W

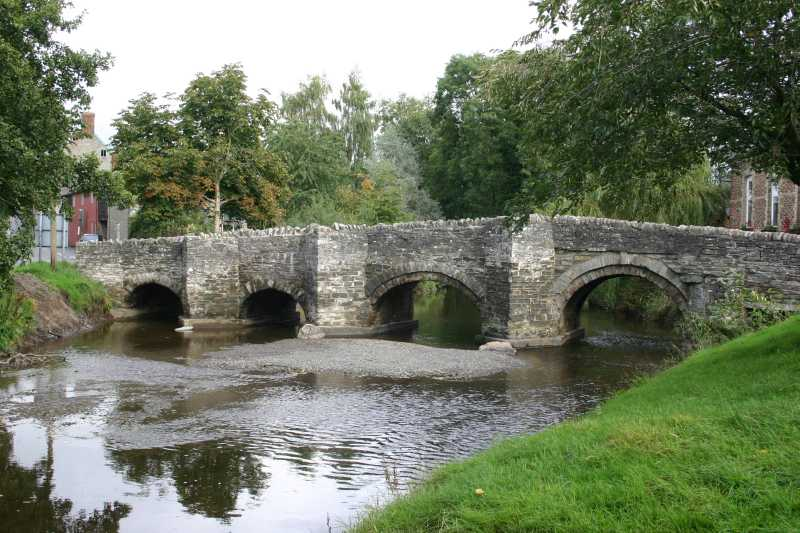
- Clun Bridge over the River Clun

- Location within Shropshire
- Population: 680 (2011 Census)
- OS grid reference: SO302808
- Civil parish: Clun and Chapel Lawn
- Unitary authority: Shropshire
- Ceremonial county: Shropshire
- Region: West Midlands
- Country: England
- Sovereign state: United Kingdom
- Post town: CRAVEN ARMS
- Postcode district: SY7
- Dialling code: 01588
- Police: West Mercia
- Fire: Shropshire
- Ambulance: West Midlands
- UK Parliament: South Shropshire

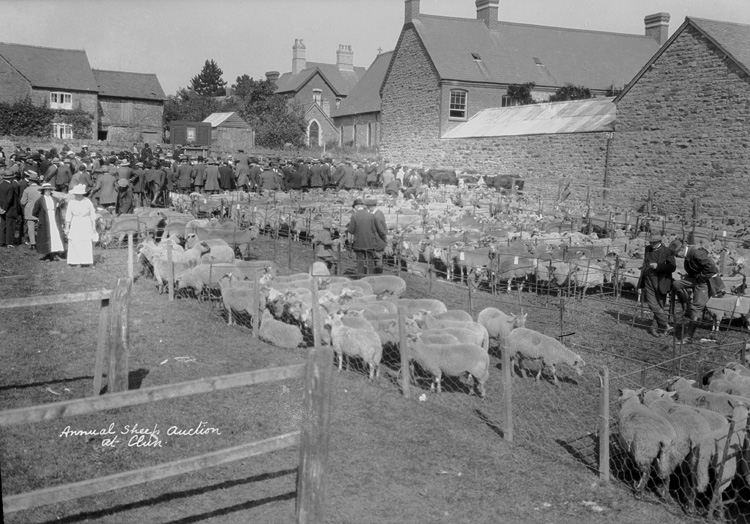
Annual sheep auction; P B Abery (1877?–1948); 1920s

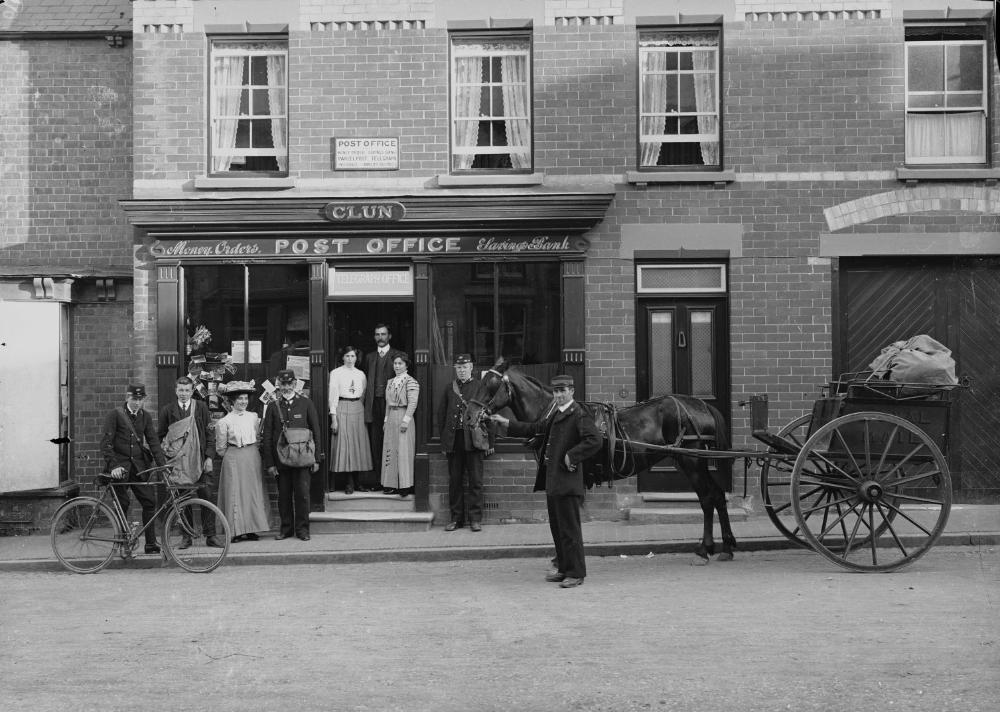
Clun post office, 1910s

Clun /ˈklʌn/ is a town in south west Shropshire, England, and the Shropshire Hills National Landscape. The 2011 census recorded 680 people living in the town. Research by the Campaign for the Protection of Rural England suggests that Clun is one of the "most tranquil" locations in England.

== History ==
Clun takes its name from the river upon whose banks it stands. Deriving from the Welsh Colunwy, it shares its very early Brythonic root with the two rivers Colne, in Lancashire and Essex, each of which has a town of the same name on its banks.

Clun grew up around the site of an Anglo-Saxon church towards the end of the 7th century AD. However, in the surrounding area there was a scattered population at least as early as the Neolithic period, about 5000 years ago. Clun was on the historic drove road where flocks and herds were driven from Wales to the markets in the Midlands and London. At the time of the Norman Conquest Clun formed part of the extensive lands of Eadric the Wild, who led a revolt against King William I, whereon his lands were confiscated and given to Roger de Montgomery who was created Earl of Shrewsbury. Roger in turn granted 27 manors, of which Clun was the largest, to Picot de Say. These lands constituted a single Marcher Lordship which became known as the Barony of Clun. The de Say family established Clun Castle.

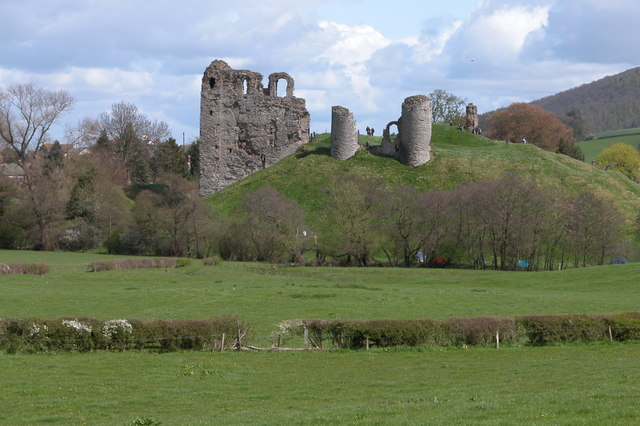
Clun Castle

The 14th-century Clun Bridge, a pack horse bridge that crosses the river connecting Saxon Clun to Norman Clun, has given rise to a local saying: "whoever crosses Clun Bridge comes back sharper than he went".

Clun Mill located to the north of the town is nicknamed the "malevolent mill" on account of numerous deaths having been recorded there and occupants disappearing after purchasing it. Last used around 1920, it opened as a youth hostel in 1932.

== Geography ==
The town's name is taken from that of the River Clun (Welsh: Colunwy), which flows from west to east through the settlement. The Clun Valley is dominated by agriculture, though some areas of woodland remain. The River Unk joins the Clun just to the west of the town.

The A488 and B4368 roads cross in the town of Clun. Craven Arms, Bishop's Castle and Ludlow are the neighbouring Shropshire towns, and Knighton, which is in Wales, is 7 miles (11 km) to the south. Nearby is Offa's Dyke and the Offa's Dyke Path. Clun Forest is to the west of the town, further upstream of the Rivers Unk and Clun. The Jack Mytton Way passes through the town as does the Shropshire Way and further significant historic routes pass through the area.

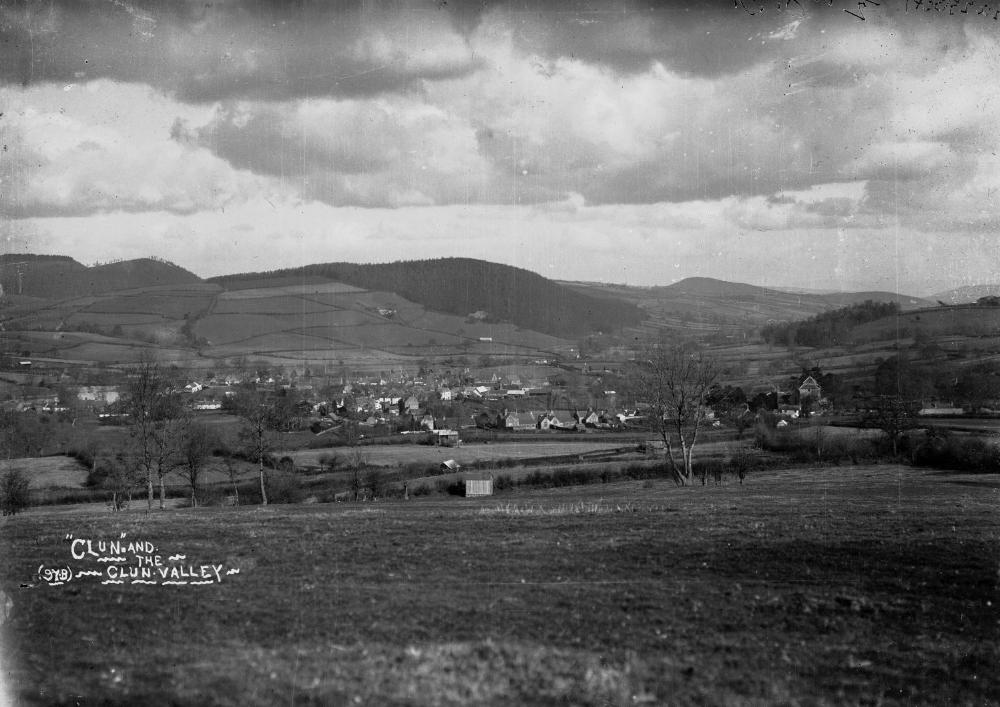
Clun, in the "Clun Valley", surrounded by agricultural lands in the early 20th century.

The town centre on the north bank of the River Clun lies 185 metres (607 ft) above sea level while the oldest part of the settlement, by St George's Church on the south bank, is a little more elevated, at 193 metres (633 ft). Between the two, Clun Bridge 181 metres (594 ft) above sea level) carries the A488 and B4368 routes across the river.

In addition to Clun Bridge there is also a ford further downstream, at Waterloo, which has recently been made usable to most motor vehicles, A third crossing point, a footbridge just upstream of Clun Bridge, connects the town's main car park to the castle grounds.

The population of the civil parish of Clun was 1,184 as measured by the 2011 census. The population of the town is considerably less than that of its much wider parish, recorded as just 680 people in 2011, compared with 642 in 2001; this is a population normally associated with that of a village in modern-day England. It is said that the population of the town is now smaller than it was during the flourishing days of the wool trade in England centuries ago. The town is the smallest in Shropshire and is smaller than many villages in the county. It is also the only town in Shropshire never to have had a railway line or station.

The electoral division of Clun covers a much wider area than the civil parish and the population of this division recorded at the 2011 census was 3,964.

== Attractions ==
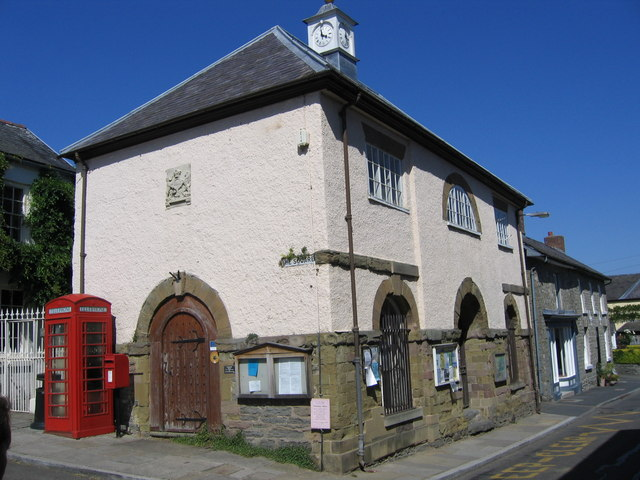
Clun Town Hall, now a museum, by The Square

Attractions in the town include:

- the Norman Clun Castle, now only a ruin but with grounds which are used for the May fair
- the fifteenth century Clun Bridge (basically a packhorse bridge), most of which is still the original stone despite being a road bridge today used by all vehicles
- Trinity Hospital, almshouses built in 1614, on Hospital Lane
- a museum in Clun Town Hall, on the corner of The Square and High Street

The main church in the town is St George's Church, which is situated on the steep rise out of the town ("Church Street") to the south of Clun Bridge. The nave includes Norman columns, but the entire church apart from the tower was rebuilt extensively by the Victorian architect G. E. Street in 1877.

Clun is a popular starting point for walkers who wish to explore the Shropshire Way, the Jack Mytton Way or the local circular walks. A walkers' car park is situated at the Memorial Hall.

== Facilities ==
The main streets in the town are Enfield Street, The Square, High Street, Ford Street, Bridge Street and Church Street. Along these streets are a handful of shops including a hair salon and a convenience store. The town previously had two butchers, which have since closed. However, there are two cafes, one directly on the bridge in a beautiful spot. Caractacus is a shop selling many things from candles to cards in the Square and further along on Ford Street is Craft Creations which opens on selected days and sells handcrafted items made by artisans in the Clun Valley. There is also a post office (now within the convenience store) and a museum in the Square. On the Craven Arms Road there are a number of small businesses (mostly at "The Green Industrial Estate"), as well as the local fire station.

There are two pubs in the town – the Sun Inn and the White Horse Inn. The Buffalo Head Hotel ("the Buffalo") has been closed since about 2004, but has not yet been converted into another use (it lies dormant). The White Horse has an entry in the CAMRA Good Beer Guide 2015.

The town has a primary school (St George's). Renowned for its great nursery, the school is situated near the church where it holds its annual nativity and various festivals and plays, open to children and parents. The school has a reputation across Shropshire for its excellent education and student support.

There are two community centres: the Memorial Hall (dedicated to local dead of both World Wars whose names are listed on boards indoors) in the north, which hosts community events such as sports days and "Flicks in the Sticks" (regular showings of films and plays), and can also be rented out for weddings; and the Hightown Community Room, located in the south.

There is also a Youth Hostel at Clun Mill, just to the north of the town.

There is a short stay car park on the B4368 Newcastle Road, near Clun Bridge, where there are public toilets, although walkers and tourists are encouraged to use the longer stay Memorial Hall car park to prevent overcrowding.

== Festivals ==
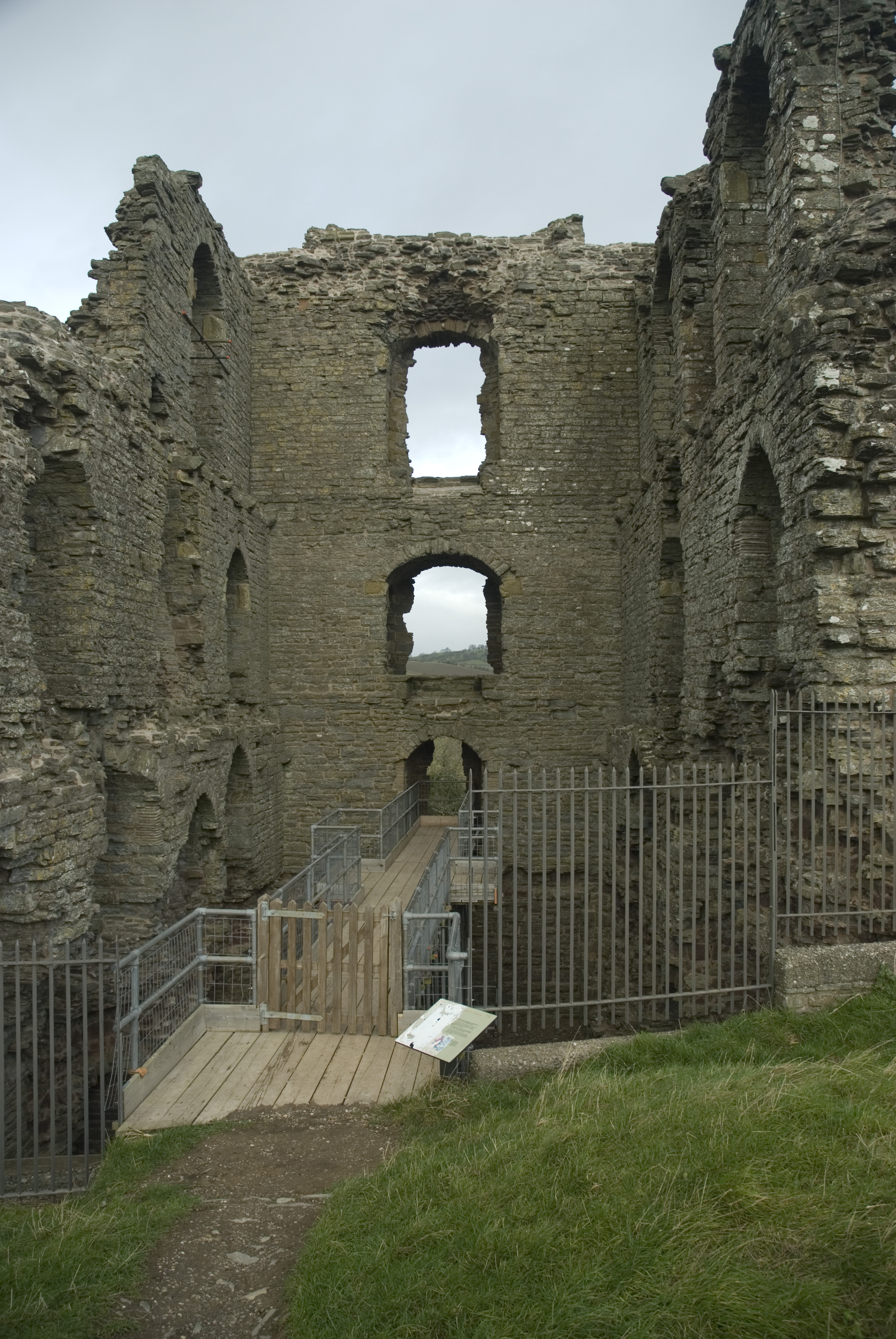
Ruins of Clun Castle, 2007

Over the three days of the first May bank holiday every year, the Green Man festival is held. On the bank holiday Monday the Green Man enters Clun to battle the spirit of winter at Clun Bridge and a May fair is held in the grounds of Clun Castle with a May Queen.

The last weekend in June is Clun Open Gardens. Approximately 20 private gardens are open to the public. Cream teas, plants, books and refurbished garden tools are all on sale. St George's Church is the host to flower arrangements and also holds music recitals.

The first Saturday in August every year sees the Clun Carnival and Show take place with a procession through the town's streets and a fete at the playing fields to the north of the town. Local people of all ages flock to exhibit their marrows, Victoria sponges and flower arrangements in the show tent. There are many stalls, a bouncy castle and a tea tent.

The first weekend in October sees the Clun Valley Beer Festival which takes place in the six open pubs in the valley (from Anchor to Aston on Clun).

== Media ==
In terms of television, the town is covered by BBC Midlands Today and ITV News Central both broadcast from Birmingham. Television signals are received from the local relay transmitter which is transmitted from the Wrekin transmitter, it is situated south east of the town.

Local radio stations are BBC Radio Shropshire on 104.1 FM, Sunshine Radio on 105.9 FM, Greatest Hits Radio Black Country & Shropshire on 106.5 FM, and Hits Radio Black Country & Shropshire on 103.1 FM.

The Shropshire Star is the local newspaper which covers the town.

== Related uses of the name ==
Clun is also a term used sometimes for the extreme southwest part of the county of Shropshire. Shropshire Council has an electoral division called Clun which covers Clun and the surrounding parishes. From the 2009 elections this electoral division continued to exist, though became slightly smaller. The electoral division returns one councillor to the council. The term "Clun Valley" is also used for the villages and communities along the River Clun – such as Anchor, Newcastle and Aston on Clun.

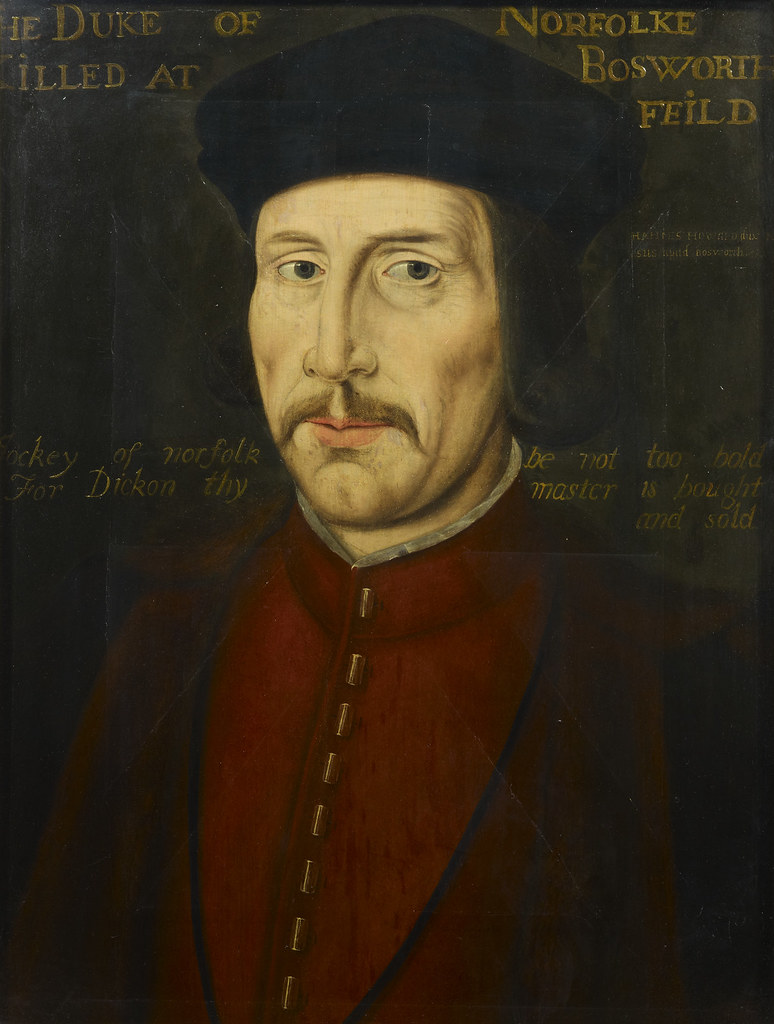
John Howard, 1st Duke of Norfolk, (3rd creation)

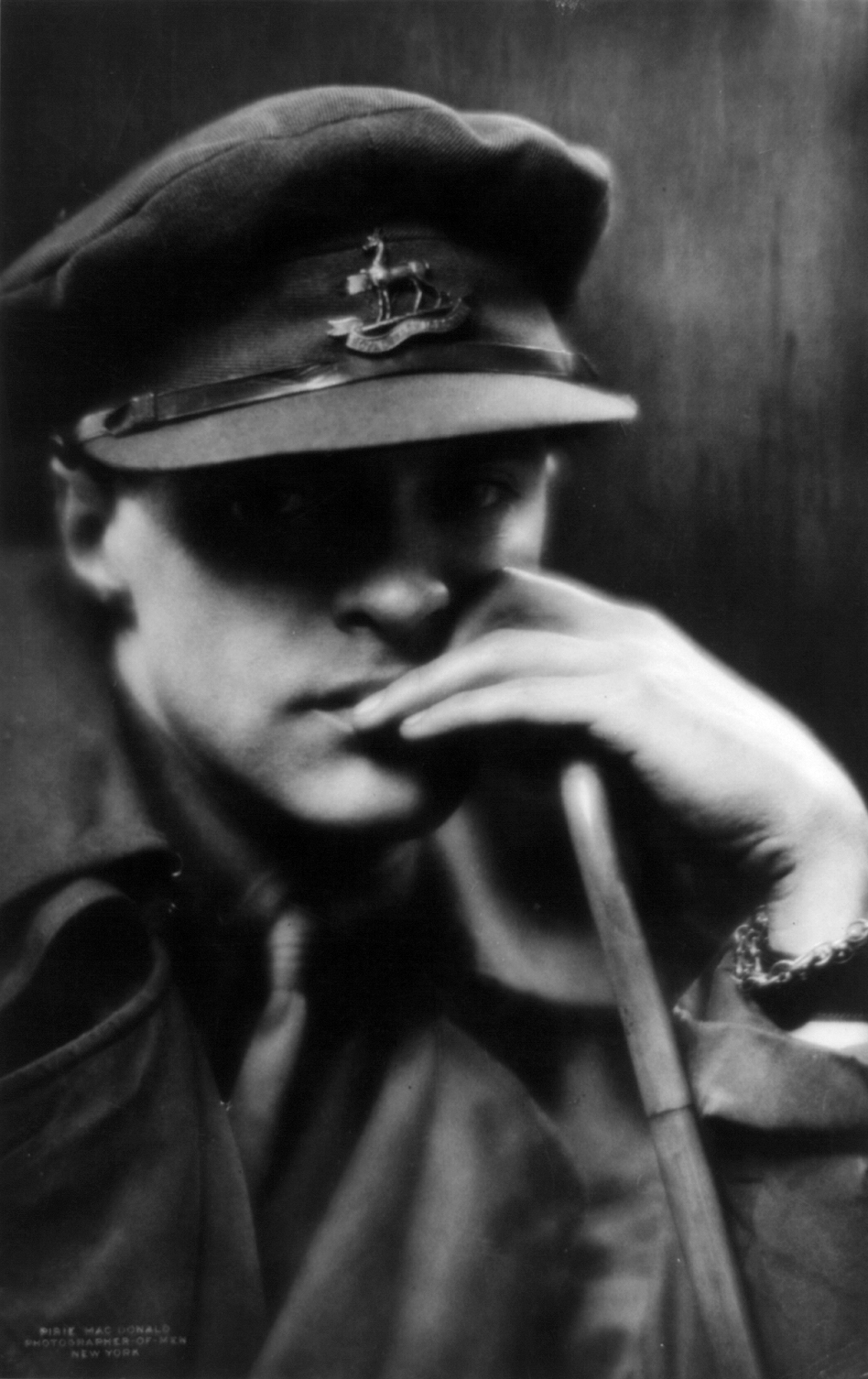
Bruce Bairnsfather, 1918

== Notable people ==
- Robert de Say (11th C.) Norman knight, noted for the initial construction of Clun Castle
- Henry de Say (died after 1130) Norman nobleman, lived in Clun, he inherited Clun Castle from his father, Robert
- Helias de Say (died 1165), also called Hellias, a Norman nobleman, lived in Clun
- Duke of Norfolk (third creation 1483) is also Baron of Clun.
- Sir Robert Howard (1585–1653) politician, inherited Clun Castle in 1626 from his brother.
- The Hon George Herbert (1825-1894) was Vicar of Clun 1855-1867 before becoming Dean of Hereford.
- Bruce Bairnsfather (1887–1959) cartoonist, created Old Bill cartoons, lived at Cresswell House during WWII.
- Keith Kissack (1913 in Clun – 2010) a British schoolteacher and historian
- John Osborne (1929–1994 in Clunton) playwright, wrote Look Back in Anger, lived in Clunton.
- Guy N. Smith (1939–2020) English writer mainly in horror fiction and other genres, lived near Clun in later life.

=== Sports ===
- John Burrough (1873 in Clun – 1922) first-class cricketer, played in 24 matches for Cambridge University
- William Burrough (1875 in Clun – 1939) played first-class cricket for Somerset
- Martin Woosnam (1903 in Clun – 1962) amateur international footballer who represented Wales Amateurs, played for Thames A.F.C. and Brentford F.C.

== In culture ==
- Sir Walter Scott is said to have stayed at The Buffalo Inn while writing part of his novel The Betrothed (published 1825), basing the castle called in the story Garde Doloreuse on Clun Castle.
- In A Shropshire Lad, A. E. Housman used (but did not write) the local verse: "Clunton and Clunbury,/ Clungunford and Clun,/ Are the quietest places/ Under the sun."
- E. M. Forster visited Clun, which subsequently featured as Oniton in his novel Howards End (1910).
- Malcolm Saville wrote a series of books about a group of children who solve mysteries and have adventures (The Lone Pine Club) either in Clun or in places close to the town.

== See also ==
- Listed buildings in Clun
