= Heath, Herefordshire =

Hamlet in Herefordshire, England

Coordinates: 52.383°N 2.908°W

(The) Heath
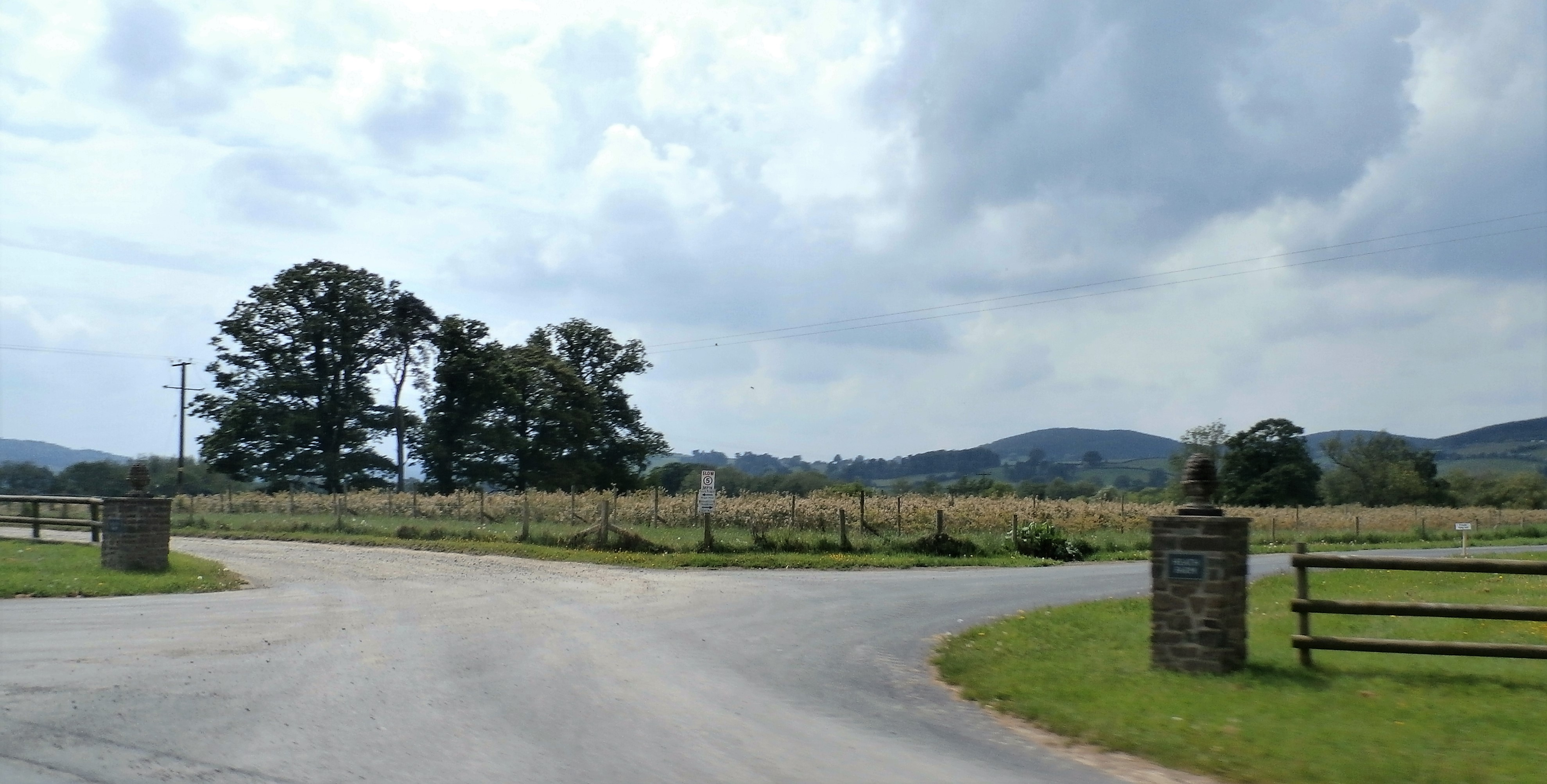
- Entrance to Heath Farm

- Location within Herefordshire
- OS grid reference: SO382765
  - London: 160 miles (258 km)
- Civil parish: Leintwardine
- Unitary authority: Herefordshire
- Ceremonial county: Herefordshire
- Region: West Midlands
- Country: England
- Sovereign state: United Kingdom
- Post town: CRAVEN ARMS
- Postcode district: SY7 0
- Dialling code: 01547 530
- Police: West Mercia
- Fire: Hereford and Worcester
- Ambulance: West Midlands
- UK Parliament: North Herefordshire

Heath (or The Heath) is a dispersed hamlet in north Herefordshire, England.

It lies in the civil parish of Leintwardine, on the other side of the River Clun 2.5 miles (4.0 km) northwest of that village. Two equidistant routes between Leintwardine and Heath are possible: via the B-roads and Broadward Bridge, or via Jay Bridge (both bridges crossing the Clun).

The hamlets of Heath and nearby Jay formed a single township and whilst in the present day form part of the civil parish of Leintwardine, and thus a part of Herefordshire, they were regarded as being part of Shropshire until the mid-19th century.

Heath Farm is a large farm with eight recently constructed chicken breeding barns (situated by the Heart of Wales Line). The area was until recently dominated by arable farming, but today is much more diversified.

Heath House is a country house and has extensive stables for horses. The Heath House estate has a number of houses and substantial outbuildings in proximity to the main house. In 1987 Simon Dale, a retired architect was murdered in Heath House. The murder remains unsolved.

The B4367 road passes between Heath House and Heath Farm (to its west). At the north end of the settlement is Heath Lodge, a house with a thatched-roof, situated at the junction of the B4367 and B4385 roads, right on the border with Shropshire.

To the north is the larger settlement of Hopton Heath (in Shropshire) with its railway station, to the southwest is the small village of Bedstone (in Shropshire), and to the east is the hamlet of Broadward (again, in Shropshire).
