= Broadward =

Hamlet in Shropshire, England

Coordinates: 52.384°N 2.899°W

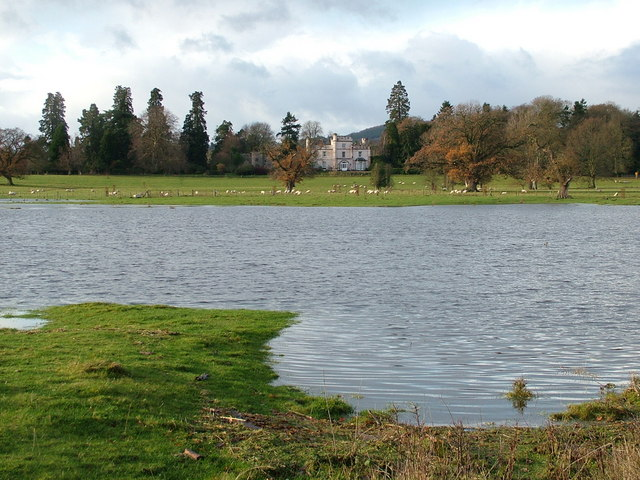
- Broadward Hall

- Location within Shropshire
- OS grid reference: SO388766
  - London: 159 miles (256 km)
- Civil parish: Clungunford
- Unitary authority: Shropshire
- Ceremonial county: Shropshire
- Region: West Midlands
- Country: England
- Sovereign state: United Kingdom
- Post town: CRAVEN ARMS
- Postcode district: SY7 0
- Dialling code: 01547
- Police: West Mercia
- Fire: Shropshire
- Ambulance: West Midlands
- UK Parliament: Ludlow

Broadward is a dispersed hamlet in south Shropshire, England, situated by the border with Herefordshire. It is in the civil parish of Clungunford, a village approximately 2 miles (3.2 km) to the north.

== Geography ==
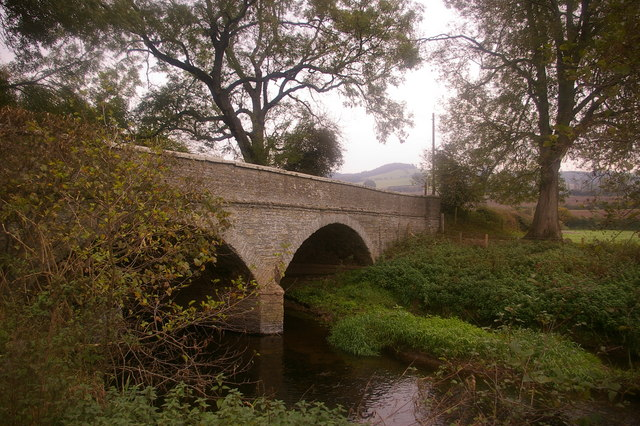
Broadward Bridge – its two arches take the B4385 main road over the River Clun.

The placename is shared by a number of buildings in the area, including Broadward Hall, a country house.

The River Clun flows to the east of Broadward (from north to south) and after passing Broadward exits Shropshire and enters Herefordshire; the river here is a private fishery. The stretch of the River Clun south of Broadward Bridge is a Site of Special Scientific Interest. Broadward lies generally at an elevation of 130 metres (430 ft) above sea level, on gently undulating land within the lower Clun Valley. The hamlet lies just above the flood plain, which is quite extensive, with the fields between the hall and the River Clun being flood meadows. Agriculture in the area is a mixture of arable and livestock (traditionally sheep and cattle) farming.

Broadward is situated on the B4385 main road and is approximately 1/2 mile (0.80 km) from Hopton Heath railway station which is on the Heart of Wales Line. At Hopton Heath the 740 bus service calls, with 3 buses a day to Ludlow and Knighton. Built in 1831, Broadward Bridge takes the main road over the River Clun (grid reference SO394767) and is a Grade II Listed structure.

Broadward forms the southerly end of the parish of Clungunford. Immediately to the north, and also in the parish, lies the hamlet of Beckjay, which can be accessed from Broadward by a lane leading off the main road. The nearest villages with amenities (each including a post office, two pubs and local convenience shops) are Leintwardine (2 miles) and Bucknell (3 miles). The nearest market towns are Knighton (in Wales), Craven Arms and – the largest – Ludlow, which is 9 miles (14 km) away. The county town of Shropshire, Shrewsbury, is 25 miles (40 km) distant by road.

=== Communications ===
The postcode is SY7 0QA, except for Broadward Barn and Broadward Bridge which have their own postcode SY7 0PZ. There is a Royal Mail post box on the main road by the Gate Lodge. The post town for Broadward is Craven Arms; historically it was Aston on Clun.

The dialling code is 01547 (the Knighton area code) followed by 530 (the Bucknell exchange) for the majority of the settlement, or 540 (the Leintwardine exchange) for Broadward Barn and Broadward Bridge.

== History ==
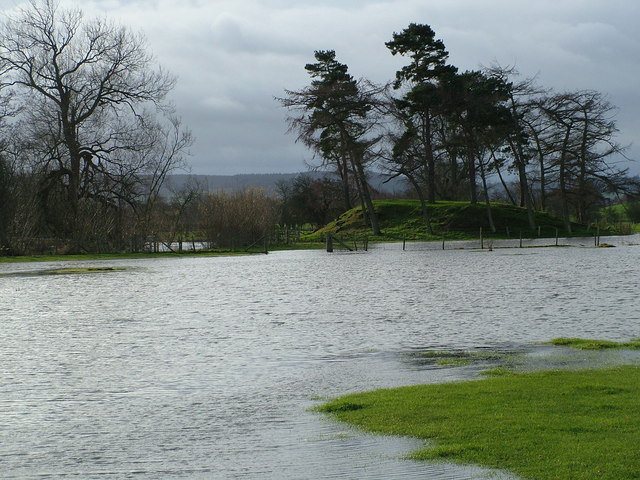
The remains of the motte, now wooded, with the River Clun in flood around it.

Broadward Hall is a Grade II Listed building, largely a 19th-century remodelling of an 18th-century house, with a castellated Gothic appearance. Broadward dates back much earlier however, and was a medieval settlement with township status within the Clungunford parish. The hall is a private residence and is not open to visitors.

The hall was once part of the Hopton Castle Estate and for 200 years was the home of the Bayley family. In 1943 it was purchased by the Bilston Corporation, who planned to develop it into a children's home, which did not happen, and in 1947 it was bought by Thomas Watkins. The hall continues as a private residence, and there remains a small sheep farm on the estate.

The placename is derived from "broad ford"; the exact location of where this ford was is unknown and no ford exists in modern times (the crossing being replaced by Broadward Bridge). The historic change of the second element of the name, from "ford" to "ward", is the reverse of what happened to the placename of Clungunford.

To the east of the hall, and adjacent to a public right of way, is an old motte (grid reference SO393765) originating from medieval times after the Norman Conquest, which is designated as a scheduled monument. It was built to control the crossing of the River Clun (by way of the old ford) and is only big enough to have supported a watch tower. It lies roughly halfway between the mottes at Clungunford and Leintwardine, also located by the Clun.

Bronze Age artefacts – mainly spearheads and sword fragments – have been discovered in the riparian vicinity of the hall, initially from an excavation (for drainage works) in 1867. Many of the findings are now in the British Museum and form part of the Broadward complex. The artefacts were over a metre below modern-day ground level and are believed to have been offerings to water gods in what was a marshy landscape; the level of the ground has since risen in the area (by natural process of alluvial material deposited in times of flood) and the area has also now been drained for agriculture.
