= Ripley baronets of Rawdon (1880) =

Escutcheon of the Ripley baronets of Rawdon

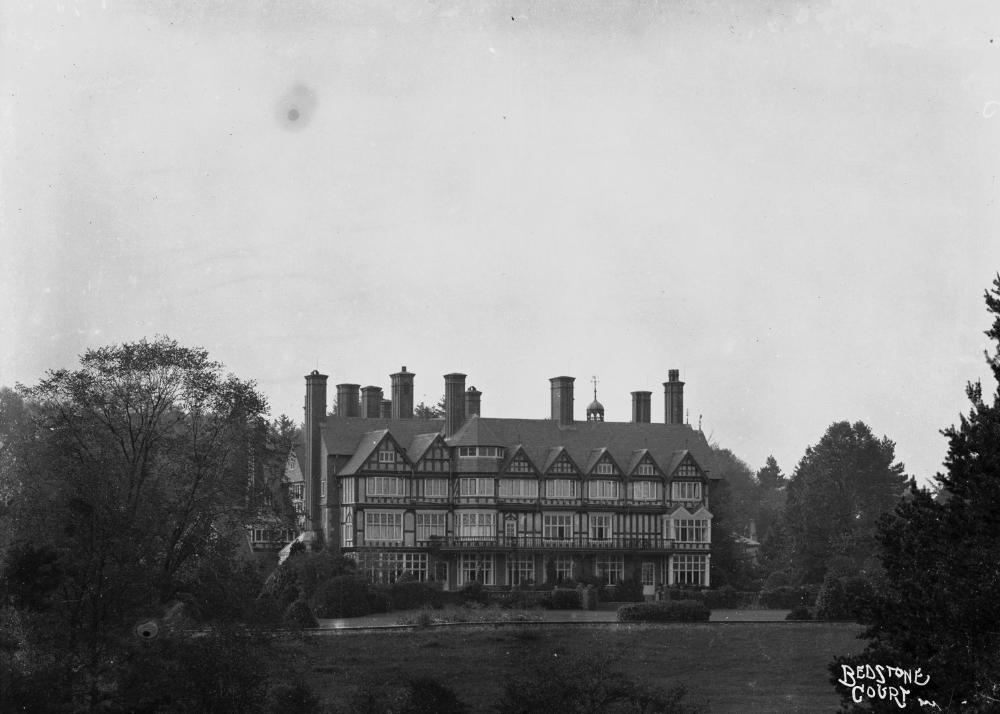
Bedstone Court, photograph c.1900

The Ripley baronetcy, of Rawdon in the County of York and Bedstone, Shropshire, was created in the Baronetage of the United Kingdom on 8 May 1880 for the businessman and politician Henry Ripley. He was succeeded by his eldest son the 2nd Baronet, who was High Sheriff of Shropshire in 1891. The family seat was Bedstone Court, Shropshire, and later in Bedstone.

== Ripley baronets, of Rawdon (1880) ==
- Sir Henry William Ripley, 1st Baronet (1813–1882)
- Sir Edward Ripley, 2nd Baronet (1840–1903)
- Sir Henry William Alfred Ripley, 3rd Baronet (1879–1956)
- Sir Hugh Ripley, 4th Baronet (1916–2003)
- Sir William Ripley, 5th Baronet (born 1950)

There is no heir to the baronetcy.

== Notes ==
Baronetage of the United Kingdom
Preceded by Allsopp baronets	Ripley baronets of Rawdon; 8 May 1880	Succeeded by Bourne baronets
