= Broome, Shropshire =

Village in Shropshire, England

Coordinates: 52.423°N 2.883°W

Broome
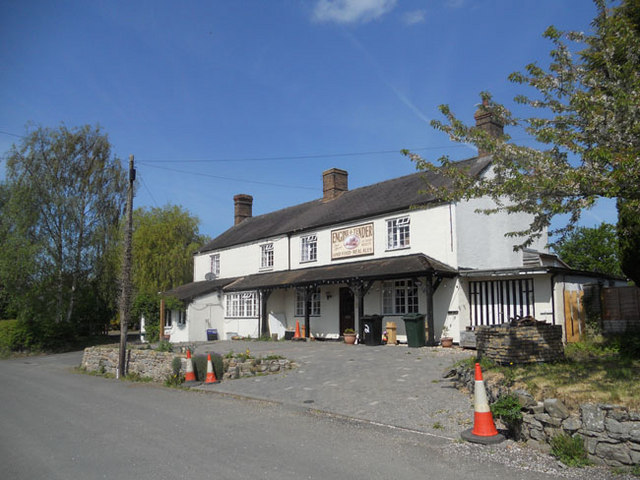
- The Engine and Tender public house at Broome, in 2011

- Location within Shropshire
- OS grid reference: SO399809
- Civil parish: Hopesay
- Unitary authority: Shropshire
- Ceremonial county: Shropshire
- Region: West Midlands
- Country: England
- Sovereign state: United Kingdom
- Post town: CRAVEN ARMS
- Postcode district: SY7
- Dialling code: 01588
- Police: West Mercia
- Fire: Shropshire
- Ambulance: West Midlands
- UK Parliament: Ludlow

Broome (/bruːm/) (historically: Broom) is a small village in south Shropshire, England.

It has a railway station on the Heart of Wales Line, and is near to Aston on Clun, Clungunford and the small market town of Craven Arms. There is a pub — the Engine and Tender — currently closed. The River Clun flows nearby.

It is part of the civil parish of Hopesay.

== See also ==
- Listed buildings in Hopesay
