= Shirley Banfield =

Shirley Banfield may refer to:

- Shirley Banfield (cricketer) (1937–2026), Australian cricketer
- Shirley Banfield (criminal), convicted and later acquitted of murdering her husband, Don Banfield
