= Twitchen, Shropshire =

Hamlet in Shropshire, England

Coordinates: 52.407°N 2.928°W

Twitchen
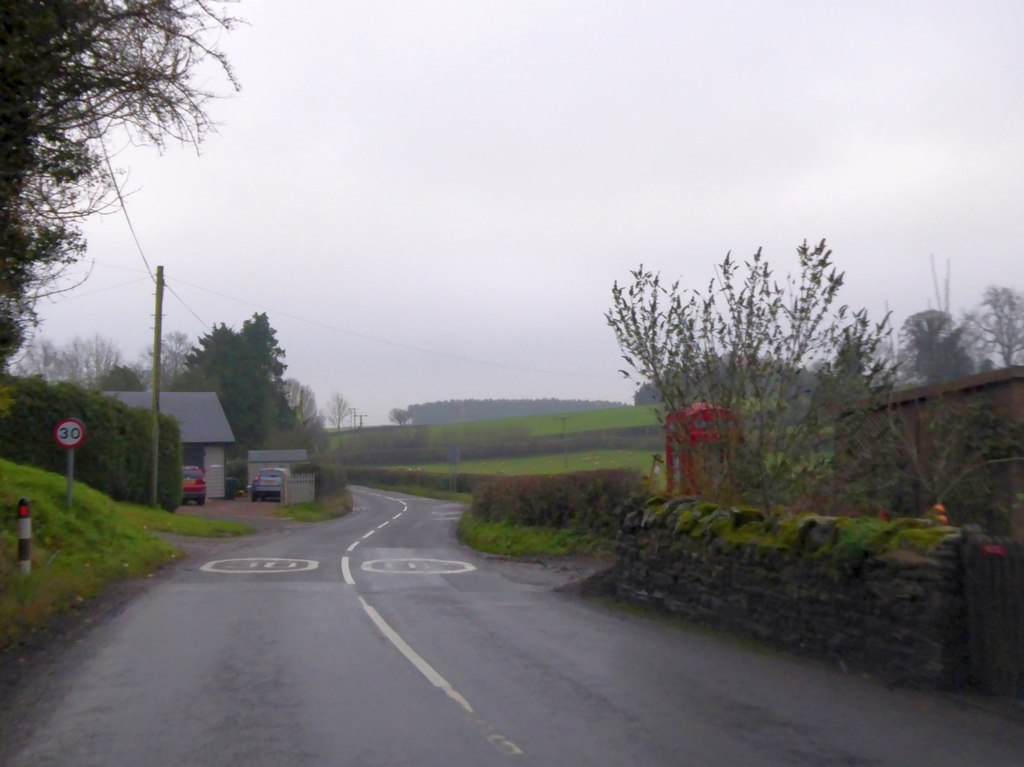
- The road through Twitchen

- Location within Shropshire
- OS grid reference: SO368792
- Civil parish: Clunbury
- Unitary authority: Shropshire
- Ceremonial county: Shropshire
- Region: West Midlands
- Country: England
- Sovereign state: United Kingdom
- Post town: CRAVEN ARMS
- Postcode district: SY7
- Dialling code: 01588
- Police: West Mercia
- Fire: Shropshire
- Ambulance: West Midlands
- UK Parliament: Ludlow

Twitchen is a hamlet in Shropshire, England, on the B4385 south of Purslow and near to Hopton Castle.

The southern part of the settlement is called Three Ashes.

A mile southeast of Twitchen is the small railway station at Hopton Heath, on the Heart of Wales Line.

Three civil parishes come together at Twitchen: Clunbury, Hopton Castle and Clungunford.
