= Beckjay =

Hamlet in Shropshire, England

Coordinates: 52.392°N 2.894°W

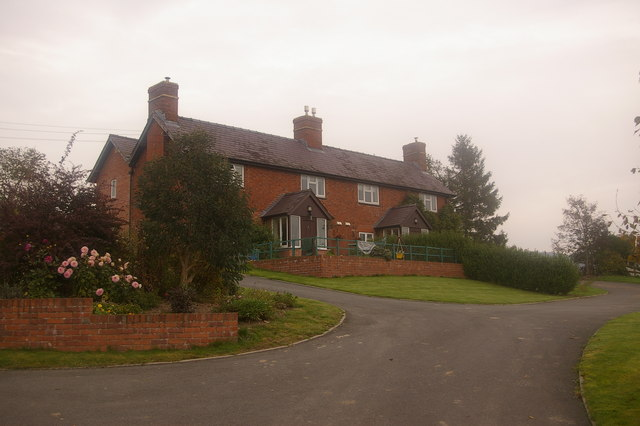
- Cottages in the hamlet of Beckjay

- Location within Shropshire
- OS grid reference: SO392775
- Civil parish: Clungunford
- Unitary authority: Shropshire
- Ceremonial county: Shropshire
- Region: West Midlands
- Country: England
- Sovereign state: United Kingdom
- Post town: CRAVEN ARMS
- Postcode district: SY7
- Dialling code: 01547
- Police: West Mercia
- Fire: Shropshire
- Ambulance: West Midlands
- UK Parliament: Ludlow

Beckjay is a hamlet in the south of the English county of Shropshire.

Its name, and that of the nearby hamlet of Jay (about 1 1/2 miles (2.4 km) south), is probably a reference to the family of Elias de Jay, who held the local manor of Bedston until 1349. A relative of this family, Brian de Jay, was the last recorded master of the English Knights Templar.

Forming part of the civil parish of Clungunford, Beckjay is close to the border with Herefordshire on the west bank of the River Clun. It was a medieval township. Nearby are the hamlets of Hopton Heath, which has a railway station on the Heart of Wales Line, and Broadward with its 18th-century hall.

There is a Royal Mail post box in the hamlet. The settlement also features a house with a thatched-roof. A duck pond exists just to the south of the settlement, downhill from it.

The former Beckjay Mill (situated to the northeast of the hamlet, on the Clun) was the subject of several paintings by David Cox.

== See also ==
- Listed buildings in Clungunford
