= Murder of Simon Dale =

Murder victim

- Date: 11/12 September 1987
- Location: Heath House, Heath, Herefordshire, England
- Cause: Bludgeoning
- Suspects: Baroness Susan de Stempel
- Verdict: Not guilty

Simon Dale (17 June 1919 – September 1987) was an English retired architect whose murder in September 1987 remains unsolved. Described as "an eccentric recluse", Dale was found bludgeoned to death in his countryside mansion in Heath, Herefordshire, England. The only suspect, Dale's former wife Baroness Susan de Stempel, was cleared of his murder due to insufficient physical evidence. The case is noted as being "one of West Mercia Constabulary's relatively few unsolved murders".

Though the investigation into Dale's murder did not finish with any convictions, there were successful charges of fraud against de Stempel, two of their children, and her new husband. The possible existence of £12 million worth of gold bars remains in doubt with no proof of their existence.

== Biography ==
Dale was born Thomas Simon Savage Dale on 17 June 1919 in Richmond, Surrey, to middle-class parents Beatrice (née Pritchard) and Thomas Lawrence Dale, an architect. Dale spent some of his architectural career restoring dilapidated country homes. He wrote scholarly works centring around Arthurian legend, though none were published. Ignoring the scepticism of archaeologists, he believed that Hopton Heath was an integral part of the legend and that the Holy Grail was buried in the area.

=== Susan Wilberforce ===
Susan Wilberforce, the great-great-granddaughter of Georgian politician William Wilberforce, was 23 when she met Dale in London, he being fifteen years her senior. They married in 1957, and purchased Heath House two years later, saving the Jacobean mansion, built in 1620, from likely demolition. The couple had five children but the marriage did not last.

His eyesight failing, Dale struggled to find work; they chose for Susan not to find employment. The pair regularly argued and lived in different parts of the 50-room house, finally divorcing in 1972. The couple agreed in their settlement to sell Heath House and split the profits, but the sale proved impossible. For fifteen years "unstable house prices" and Dale's refusal to leave the house stifled any interest in the property. Correspondence between their solicitors continued but did not make any progress and neither side was able to support their case financially in court.

Susan found life after her first marriage to be very difficult and had to rely on handouts from her family, finding a home in Docklow, near Leominster. She married Baron Michael Victor Jossif de Stempel in 1984, acquiring the title of Baroness. De Stempel was from a wealthy Russian family, the holders of an ancient Latvian title, and their marriage was part-funded by the sale of her aunt's jewellery. The relationship lasted just a year.

=== Death ===
Dale lived mostly in the kitchen and one bedroom in Heath House, the remainder of the property left to gather dust. Two of his children, Marcus and Sophia, had been visiting regularly to help tidy the exterior of the house and the surrounding grounds. Susan admitted to having broken into the house to reclaim furniture that she considered to be rightfully hers. During this time Dale is said to have felt besieged, and there were several angry confrontations between the two parties. Dale was found dead in the kitchen on 13 September 1987, food still cooking in the oven, by Giselle Wall, his editorial assistant. Investigations revealed that his head had been bludgeoned with a hard, narrow instrument. Dale's headstone in the churchyard of St Edward's, Hopton Castle, is inscribed with "11/12 September 1987" as the date of death.

== Trials ==
=== Murder ===
Susan, Marcus and Sophia were initially arrested on suspicion of murder, but the two children were dropped from the investigation after just a few weeks. Susan was charged with the murder of Dale but was found not guilty in the trial in Worcester Crown Court. The purported murder weapon was a crowbar that had been used by the three during renovations. It had been recently cleaned and there were no signs of blood. The prosecution said that they would accept a verdict of manslaughter, citing that Susan had been provoked by Dale's reluctance to sell the house. The case was presented with insufficient physical evidence and the charges could not be upheld. The case therefore remains as "one of West Mercia Constabulary's relatively few unsolved murders".

=== Fraud ===
As part of the murder investigation, police conducted routine financial checks. They became suspicious of the fate of Margaret Illingworth (née Wilberforce), Susan's aunt and the second wife of former cabinet minister Albert Illingworth, 1st Baron Illingworth. Margaret was suffering from dementia and was invited to holiday in the de Stempel home in Docklow in February 1984. While there her fortune, much of it in the form of gold bars and valuable paintings, disappeared. At the same time her money and shares were sold using forged signatures and the contents of her London flat were emptied and sold at auction. It is estimated that Margaret was defrauded out of around £1 million before being placed in the care of a nursing home at Hereford. She died in late 1986 and, as other members of the family were mostly unaware of her whereabouts, few attended her cremation at Hereford Crematorium. Margaret's will had been recently changed to remove her request to be buried in the Illingworth family tomb in Bradford. It also named Susan as the main recipient of most of her possessions.

While in custody from the murder trial in 1988, Susan remained under investigation for fraud in early 1990, two years later. Shortly before facing trial in Birmingham, Susan changed her plea to guilty of defrauding her aunt out of £500,000. Marcus and Sophia maintained their innocence, claiming to be the "unwitting tools" of their mother, and her husband Michael was also brought in. The four were found guilty, with the judge declaring Susan a "malign and appalling influence" on her children. Michael was believed to have used his understanding of banking and wills to aid the fraudulent affair. Susan was sentenced to seven years and Michael to four years. Sophia and Marcus were given 30 months and 18 months respectively. Investigations into the whereabouts of Margaret's thirty gold bars, valued at £12 million, proved fruitless despite a dig in the grounds of Heath House. The existence of the gold has never been proven.

== Documentary ==
In 2011, a documentary on the case was aired by Investigation Discovery as part of their Great Crimes and Trials series. The episode was titled 'Murder in the Mansion'.

== Books ==
The history of this case is detailed in The Trials of the Baroness, a 1991 book by Terry Kirby. It is also the basis for the true crime book Blood Money: The Story Of The Baroness de Stempel Scandal by Kate Wharton. The case also serves as the inspiration for The Jesse Tree by Linda Hurcombe, a 2018 novel in which the murder, the trial and the gold bars are woven into the fictional story of a young Romany Gypsy and her friend.

== See also ==
- Murders of Harry and Megan Tooze – similar 1993 case in Wales
