= Twitchen =

Twitchen may refer to:

- Twitchen, Devon
- Twitchen, Shropshire
