= Abcott =

Hamlet in England

Coordinates: 52.403°N 2.896°W

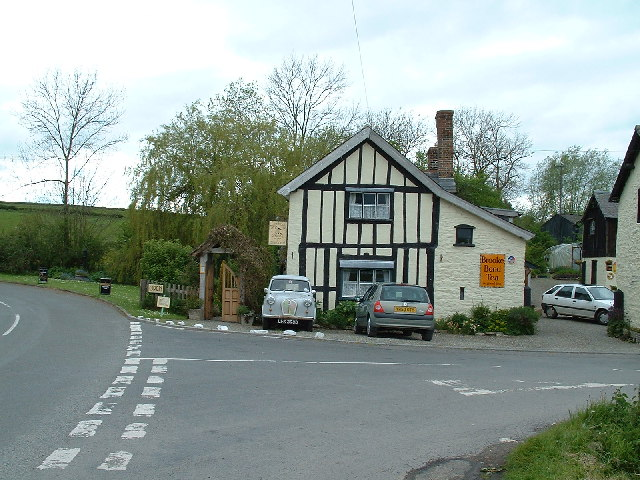
- The tea rooms at Abcott; the road to the left is the B4367; the lane leading off it heads through the hamlet and onwards to Twitchen.

- Location within Shropshire
- OS grid reference: SO390787
- Civil parish: Clungunford
- Unitary authority: Shropshire
- Ceremonial county: Shropshire
- Region: West Midlands
- Country: England
- Sovereign state: United Kingdom
- Post town: CRAVEN ARMS
- Postcode district: SY7
- Dialling code: 01588
- Police: West Mercia
- Fire: Shropshire
- Ambulance: West Midlands
- UK Parliament: Ludlow

Abcott is a hamlet in south Shropshire, England.

It lies on the west side of the River Clun and its flood plain, just opposite the village of Clungunford. Abcott is part of the parish of Clungunford. The B4367 road crosses the Clun (at Clungunford Bridge) and passes the hamlet, on its way between Clungunford and Bucknell. A lane connects the B4367 at Abcott and Twitchen.

The famous Rocke Cottage tea rooms is situated on the B road at Abcott (formerly the Bird on the Rock tea rooms, and historically the Rocke Arms public house). Abcott Manor is a Grade II* ("two star") Listed building.

Abcott was a medieval township, despite its proximity to the parish's main village and parish church (St Cuthbert's) just on the other side of the Clun.

The 740 bus service calls at Abcott, outside the tea rooms, with three buses a day to Ludlow and Knighton. Nearby is Hopton Heath, which has a railway station on the Heart of Wales Line, which passes by the hamlet.

== See also ==
- Listed buildings in Clungunford
