= Disappearance of Don Banfield =

2001 British disappearance case

Don Banfield
- Banfield before he disappeared, c. early 2001
- Born: Donald Banfield; 1937 or 1938; Trinidad
- Disappeared: 11 May 2001 (age 63); 146 Locket Road, Harrow, London
- Status: Missing for 25 years, 1 month and 24 days; believed to have been murdered
- Known for: Family members being convicted of murder despite no body and the conviction being quashed in a unique case due to joint enterprise not having been proved
- Spouse: Shirley Banfield (m. 1980)
- Children: 6

Donald Banfield (born 1937 or 1938) was a British man who disappeared from his home in Harrow, London in suspicious circumstances on 11 May 2001. His case is notable for being a rare case in which a murder conviction was secured without a body, and for this conviction being subsequently quashed on the grounds that a joint enterprise conviction in such a case where no body was found was not viable, though the defence accepted that the "likelihood" was that "one or other" of the two suspects in the case had murdered him.

Despite authorities not finding Banfield's body, his wife Shirley and daughter Lynette were convicted of murder in 2012. They also pleaded guilty to fraudulently stealing his pension money and the proceeds from the sale of the family house for years after his disappearance, apparently knowing that he would not be able to return to expose them for taking more than £180,000 of his money.

The fraud had started only days after he disappeared, with the women pretending to be Don in documents to request his money be transferred into their accounts. It was further found that they had previously attempted to murder him in the days before he vanished, and police discovered he had disappeared on the exact day that he had signed the contract with his wife agreeing to sell the family home. On the morning of the day he vanished he had also told a policeman of how the women had been attacking him.

The women were released on appeal a year after their conviction for murder, although their convictions stood for their crimes of fraud, which they had admitted. Banfield's disappearance remains unsolved.

== Background ==
Banfield disappeared from his home in May 2001. His marriage to his wife was turbulent and he was believed to be a heavy gambler and womanizer. They had agreed to sell the house, and stood to (jointly) make £179,000 from the sale. In January 2001, he abruptly retired from his job at William Hill, and stood to inherit a large pension and lump sums.

== Investigation as a murder case ==
Until 2009 the case was treated by police as a missing person's case, but in that year police reopened the investigation after his employers became suspicious, and suspicion immediately fell on his wife Shirley Banfield and daughter Lynette Banfield. Before he had vanished, Don Banfield had told others that he was being "mentally and physically tortured" by the pair, saying he thought his wife had been trying to poison his food and telling his doctor the day before he vanished that he had previously been handcuffed to his bed all night.

The day before he vanished he told his doctor that his wife had tried to tie down his legs and put a plastic bag over his head while he slept two weeks earlier, but he had woken up and started kicking and screaming, so Lynette let him go. Don had been planning to leave his marriage to Shirley, a former tax inspector, and take his pension with him, and it was found that the last known record of him being alive was on the day he had signed the contract agreeing to sell the family house, the proceeds of which were jointly due to him and Shirley.

On the morning he disappeared he had told a policeman that he thought he had been struck on the back of his head, and also said that he had awoken to find his daughter squirting furniture polish into his eyes before being confronted by his wife with a knife with them both shouting "why don't you die?". He had shown friends marks on his body as proof that he had been hit and handcuffed. Don had previously thought his post was being interfered with and only after his friend allowed him to send his mail to his address did he start receiving it. However, his post was then intercepted and he found a stash of letters addressed to him hidden behind the sofa, including cheques from William Hill. Nothing like this ever happened before he retired.

After 11 May Shirley and Lynette had forged documents with his signature on, had fraudulently collected his pension, and had suddenly moved 200 miles away to Yorkshire and then to Kent. Only four days after he vanished, as asked by Shirley, Lynette forged a letter to Don's pension administrators pretending to be him, suspiciously requesting that his pension go into his joint account with Shirley. Don was only reported missing eight days after his disappearance, and by his friend and not Shirley or Lynette. It was later noted that they could only have decided to steal his pension money and his proceeds for the sale of the house in the knowledge that he would not be coming back to expose them.

Shirley and Lynette would have known that Don would become eligible for his state pension in January 2003, and fraudulently collected it on his behalf from 22 February that year. In June 2005 Shirley made a claim for disability allowance including an entry supposedly written by Don that she and Lynette had forged. Staff from the Department for Work and Pensions helped collect evidence to demonstrate Shirley and Lynette's fraud. Shirley and Lynette spent his funds on luxury holidays and on properties for years. In total, they made £120,000 from the sale of the house that was agreed by Don on the last day he was known to be alive, and £64,000 from stealing from his pension funds over the years.

When questioned by police in 2009, Shirley and Lynette claimed to have seen Don the previous Christmas, but this was proven to be a lie. Both later admitted in court to lying about seeing Don after May 2001 to cover up their fraud, having pretended he was still alive so they could continue to claim his pension. Police enquiries across the world failed to find any evidence that he was still alive. Shirley had also given a false description to police about Don for a missing persons' poster, falsely claiming his hair was grey and that he had shaved his moustache and wore glasses, and the result was that they were tricked into releasing an entirely inaccurate and misleading image of him for missing persons' posters appealing for information of his disappearance. Don's son Kevin later said it looked nothing like him.

Don's son Kevin described how, on the last occasion he had spoken to his father, Don cried and told him he was scared of his mother and wanted to come and stay with him.

== Trial ==
In 2012 Shirley and Lynette Banfield were brought to trial for his murder at the Old Bailey and also for fraud, forgery and conspiracy to pervert justice, to which they pleaded guilty. It was alleged that the women had killed him for his share of the proceeds of the sale of the family home, which was being prepared at the time he vanished, and for his new pension money. Shirley had indeed been paid all the money due to her and Don for the house in June 2001, falsely telling the authorities that while her husband had disappeared he had been seen locally. Whilst Don would have had a pension to live on, Shirley faced the prospect of severe financial difficulties, being 54 and on the verge of being left by Don without money to rehouse both herself and Lynette. The court heard that a neighbour had reported Shirley shouting "one of these days I'll kill you" before the disappearance, but Shirley said she had been talking to her parrot. The defence admitted that the pair were guilty of lying and deception, but said that this was not evidence of murder. Shirley claimed that Don had faked his own death, though there was no evidence that he had been alive since 11 May 2001.

They were both found guilty of the murder and sentenced to a minimum of 18 and 16 years imprisonment respectively, something which was reported widely in the press and media in Britain and abroad. Neither of the women showed any emotion upon the guilty verdicts being announced.

After the conviction Don's sister Kay begged the women to reveal what they had done with his body so they could bury him. His mother had died in 2004 without knowing what had become of her son. The lead detective on the case speaking after the trial commented: "Shirley and Lynette Banfield convinced themselves they would never be found guilty of his murder, however today's verdict shatters that belief". He stated that "throughout the whole process they had just lied and lied and lied". A spokesperson for the Crown Prosecution Service said: "Their actions were motivated by greed and they robbed a man of his life purely for monetary gain. Almost 11 years since Don's disappearance, his wife and daughter no doubt believed they may have got away with their crime."

== Appeal ==
In 2013, Lynette and Shirley Banfield's convictions were overturned by the Court of Appeal. Both had been convicted of the joint enterprise murder of Banfield, but the appeals court found that the prosecution had failed to prove that both had been involved in the murder, though Shirley Banfield's lawyer, William Clegg KC, accepted that it was likely that either Shirley or Lynette Banfield had killed Don Banfield. However, in a memoir of 2018, titled 'Under The Wig', referencing the Banfield’s trial and subsequent successful appeal, Clegg says that he has no idea who may be responsible.

== See also ==
- List of solved missing person cases (2000s)
- Murder of Simon Dale – similar 1987 UK case
- List of miscarriages of justice § United Kingdom
- Double jeopardy § Post-2003
