= Listed buildings in Hopton Castle =

Hopton Castle is a civil parish in Shropshire, England. It contains eleven listed buildings that are recorded in the National Heritage List for England. Of these, one is listed at Grade I, the highest of the three grades, and the others are at Grade II, the lowest grade. The parish contains the village of Hopton Castle and the surrounding countryside. The oldest listed building in the parish consists of the remains of Hopton Castle. Most of the other listed buildings are houses, cottages, farmhouses and farm buildings, all of which are timber framed. In addition a church, two memorials in the churchyard, and a telephone kiosk are listed.

== Key ==
| Grade | Criteria |
|---|---|
| I | Buildings of exceptional interest, sometimes considered to be internationally important |
| II | Buildings of national importance and special interest |

== Buildings ==
| Name and location | Photograph | Date | Notes | Grade |
|---|---|---|---|---|
| Remains of castle 52.39583°N 2.93185°W | | c.1300 | The remains consist of the ruins of the keep of Hopton Castle on a circular motte. It is built in shale and sandstone with some remaining rendering, and has a square plan. On the corners are clasping buttresses acting as turrets, with quoins and containing slit windows. There are three stages, with a string course above the bottom stage. In the north front is a doorway with a pointed arch and a hood mould. The building is also a Scheduled Monument. | I |
| 6 and 8 Hopton Castle; 52.39784°N 2.93546°W | — | Late 15th century | A farmhouse, later a private house, it probably originated as a three-bay hall house, which was extended to the right by two bays in the 17th century when the cross-wing was also added on the left, and there was a further extension to the left in the 19th century. The house is timber framed with cruck construction and rendered brick infill, which has been encased and extended in limestone on the front and sides, and it has a tile roof. There is one storey and an attic, with a cellar under the cross-wing. There is a lean-to porch, the windows are casements, and there are gabled eaves dormers. Inside is an inglenook fireplace and two true cruck trusses. | II |
| Lower House; 52.39727°N 2.93290°W | — | Late 15th century | A farmhouse, later a private house, it was remodelled in the 17th century, and altered and extended later. The original parts are timber framed with rendered brick infill on a rendered plinth, the extensions are in limestone, partly roughcast, and the rood is tiled. There are two storeys and a T-shaped plan, probably initially a hall range, followed by a cross-wing to the left, and later extensions at both ends to the hall range. There is a gabled porch on the front, the windows are casements, and inside is an inglenook fireplace. | II |
| The Old Granary; 52.39725°N 2.93255°W | — | c. 1600 (probable) | The former granary has been converted into a house. It is timber framed with rendered infill on a limestone plinth, the limestone carried up on some fronts, and it has a tile roof. There are two storeys, and on the east side is a gabled porch. | II |
| 5 Hopton Castle; 52.39676°N 2.93213°W | | Early 17th century | The cottage was extended to the right in the later 17th century, and is timber framed with rendered brick infill, on a stone plinth. The roof of the original part is thatched, and the extension has a tile roof. The original part has one storey and an attic, and the extension has a single storey. The windows are casements, and there is a large gabled half-dormer. | II |
| Barn east of 6 and 8 Hopton Castle; 52.39772°N 2.93488°W | — | Early 17th century | The barn was later altered. It is timber framed with some weatherboarding on a stone plinth and has a tile roof. There are various openings, including eaves hatches. | II |
| Peake memorial 52.39847°N 2.93679°W | — | c. 1686 | The memorial is in the churchyard of St Mary's Church, and is to the memory of Richard Peake, a former minister of the church. It is in cast iron, and consists of an inscribed recumbent rectangular-shaped slab with slightly raised sides. | II |
| Barn south of Llantop; 52.40353°N 2.94471°W | — | Early 18th century (probable) | The barn is timber framed with weatherboarding on a stone plinth, and has a corrugated iron roof. It contains various doorways and eaves hatches. | II |
| Smith memorial and railed enclosure 52.39858°N 2.93720°W | — | c. 1840 | The memorial is in the churchyard of St Mary's Church, and is to the memory of William Smith and his wife. The monument is in sandstone, and has an inscribed raised oval panel flanked by vase-shaped balusters. On the top is a semicircular pediment with ball finials. It is in an enclosure surrounded by wrought iron railings, and also contains six stone slabs inscribed with details of other members of the Smith family. | II |
| St Mary's Church; 52.39858°N 2.93697°W | | 1869–70 | The church was designed by Thomas Nicholson in Decorated style, and is on the site of a medieval church. It is built in limestone with dressings in Bath stone, and has a slate roof with ornamental cresting and crosses on the gables. The church consists of a nave, a south porch, and a chancel with a north vestry. On the west gable is a gabled double bellcote on a broad buttress. | II |
| Telephone kiosk 52.39764°N 2.93523°W | | 1935 | A K6 type telephone kiosk, designed by Giles Gilbert Scott. Constructed in cast iron with a square plan and a dome, it has three unperforated crowns in the top panels. | II |
