= Hopesay =

Village in Shropshire, England

Coordinates: 52.445°N 2.898°W

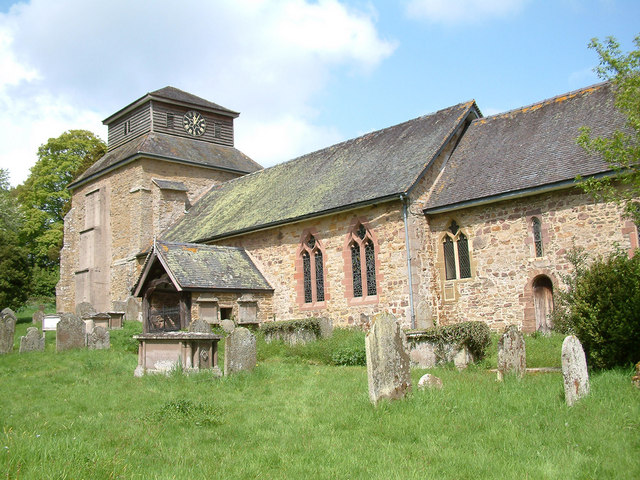
- St Mary's Church, Hopesay

- Location within Shropshire
- Population: 561 (2011)
- OS grid reference: SO389834
- Civil parish: Hopesay
- Unitary authority: Shropshire
- Ceremonial county: Shropshire
- Region: West Midlands
- Country: England
- Sovereign state: United Kingdom
- Post town: CRAVEN ARMS
- Postcode district: SY7
- Dialling code: 01588
- Police: West Mercia
- Fire: Shropshire
- Ambulance: West Midlands
- UK Parliament: Ludlow

Hopesay is a small village, and civil parish, in south Shropshire, England. The population of the parish at the 2011 census was 561.

The name 'Hopesay' derives from "Hope de Say", the valley of Picot de Say, a Norman baron who held the manor of neighbouring Sibdon Carwood and whose power base was the nearby Clun Castle. Though most of the Norman influence has been lost, the church tower does date back to Norman times.

The 13th-century church of St Mary, restored c.1880, is a Grade I listed building.

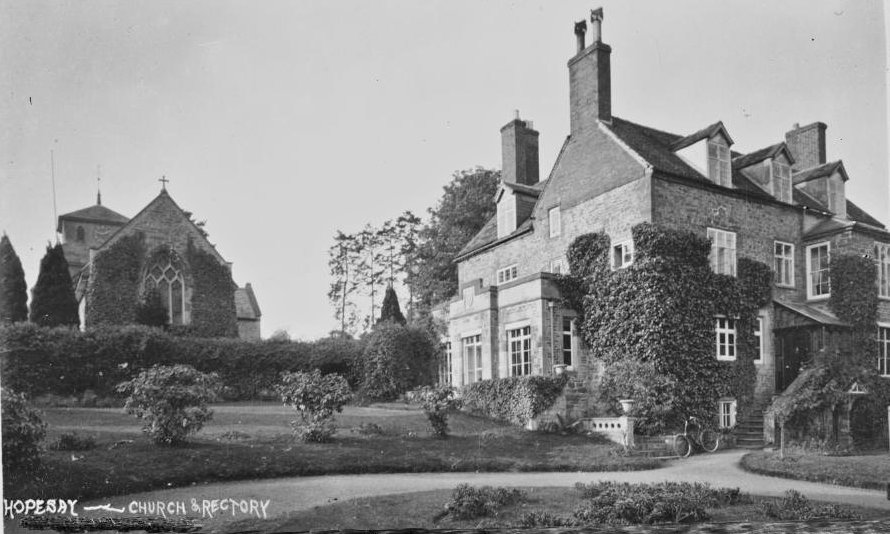
Hopesay church and rectory by Percy Benzie Abery; c. 1910

The village has an active community though in recent decades has suffered from depopulation, leading to the closure of both the village shop and Post office, and the school (closed in 1989).

Within the parish lies the larger village of Aston on Clun, and the village of Broome which has a railway station on the Heart of Wales Line. The hamlet of Basford, in the north of the parish, straddles the boundary with Edgton parish.

The writer and adventurer Vivienne de Watteville (Vivienne Goschen) is buried at Hopesay.

== See also ==
- Listed buildings in Hopesay
