= Listed buildings in Clungunford =

Clungunford is a civil parish in Shropshire, England. It contains 19 listed buildings that are recorded in the National Heritage List for England. Of these, two are listed at Grade II*, the middle of the three grades, and the others are at Grade II, the lowest grade. The parish contains the village of Clungunford, and the smaller settlements of Abcott and Beckjay, and is otherwise rural. Most of the listed buildings are houses, farmhouses and farm buildings, many of which are timber framed. The other listed buildings include a 14th-century church and a cross base in the churchyard, a bridge, and a country house.

== Key ==
Grade	Criteria
II*	Particularly important buildings of more than special interest
II	Buildings of national importance and special interest

== Buildings ==
Name and location	Photograph	Date	Notes	Grade
St Cuthbert's Church; 52.40323°N 2.89098°W		Early 14th century	The church was extensively restored in 1894–95, when the porch and tower were added. It is built in limestone and sandstone and has tile roofs. The church consists of a nave with a south porch, a chancel with a north vestry and a northwest tower. The tower has four stages, angle buttresses, a clock face, and an embattled parapet.	II*
Churchyard cross base 52.40305°N 2.89096°W	—	14th century (probable)	The cross base is in the churchyard of St Cuthbert's Church, and consists of two octagonal stone steps.	II
Rowton Grange; 52.41578°N 2.87038°W	—	16th century	The farmhouse is timber framed, partly rendered, with a tile roof. There are two storeys, and an H-shaped plan, with a hall range and two cross-wings. The windows are casements.	II
Glebe Cottage; 52.40342°N 2.89028°W	—	Late 16th century	The cottage has one storey and an attic, and a T-shaped plan, with a main range and a rear wing. The main range has a stone ground floor and timber framed panels with brick infill above, the rear wing is timber framed, and the roof is tiled. The windows are casements, and there is a gabled attic dormer.	II
1 and 2 Clungunford; 52.40270°N 2.88843°W	—	16th to 17th century	A house, later two cottages, it is timber framed on a stone plinth, partly refaced in brick, with an asbestos tile roof. There is one storey and an attic, and three bays. The windows are casements, and there are three gabled dormers.	II
Little Beckjay; 52.39305°N 2.89472°W	—	16th to 17th century	The house was later altered and extended. It is timber framed with brick infill, rendered at the front, with extensions in stone, and a stone tile roof. There are two storeys, a four-bay main range, and a projecting gabled wing on the left. The windows are casements.	II
4 Abcott; 52.40197°N 2.89724°W	—	17th century	The house was extended in the 19th century. The original part is timber framed with some weatherboarding and rebuilding in brick, the extension is in limestone, and the roof is tiled. There is one storey and an attic, the original part has three bays, and the extension is a gabled wing at right angles. The windows are casements, and there are gabled attic dormers.	II
Abcott Manor; 52.40347°N 2.89501°W	—	Mid 17th century	A timber framed house that was later extended, and partly encased in stone and brick, and with a tile roof. It has an L-shaped plan consisting of a main range with two storeys, an extension to the west with two storeys and an attic, and a cross-wing. The windows on the front are mullioned and transomed with moulded sills and cornices, and elsewhere there are cross-windows and casements. On the north side is a massive sandstone chimney stack, and some of the timber framing is close studded.	II*
Barn west of Abcott Manor; 52.40345°N 2.89590°W	—	17th century	The barn has one storey and a slate roof. The original part is timber framed and weatherboarded, and has central doors. To the right is a low extension which is partly in limestone with timber framing and weatherboarding above.	II
Bower Cottage; 52.40521°N 2.88998°W	—	17th century	The cottage was extended in the 20th century. It is timber framed with brick infill, the south gable is in stone, and the roof is thatched. There is one storey and an attic, the original part has two bays, and the 20th-century extension is a wing forming an L-shaped plan. The windows are casements, and there are attic dormers.	II
Clungunford Farmhouse; 52.40300°N 2.88730°W	—	17th century	The farmhouse was extended later in the 17th century. The original part is timber framed with brick infill, the extension is in roughcast brick, and the roof is slated. The original part has two storeys, and a projecting gabled wing on the left with a jettied upper floor. The extension is T-shaped with two storeys and an attic, and a projecting gabled cross-wing to the right containing a bay window.	II
The Thatch Cottage; 52.39276°N 2.89393°W	—	17th century	The cottage is timber framed and has a thatched roof with a scalloped edge. There is one storey and an attic, two bays, and a small extension to the left containing the entrance. The windows are casements, and the roof is arched over the attic dormers.	II
The Lynches; 52.38764°N 2.88823°W	—	Late 17th century	The house is timber framed with lath and plaster infill, partly rebuilt in limestone and rendered, and with a corrugated iron roof. There is one storey and an attic, and three bays. The doorway has a pointed segmental head, the windows are casements, and there is a central gabled dormer.	II
Cowhouse and barn north of Abcott House; 52.40214°N 2.89784°W	—	Early 18th century	The cowhouse and barn are timber framed and weatherboarded with some brick repairs, and have a corrugated iron roof. The barn is at right angles to the cowhouse, forming an L-shaped plan. The cowhouse has a loft, and on the north front are two doors, a small window, and four loft openings.	II
Cowhouse northwest of Abcott Manor; 52.40361°N 2.89572°W	—	Early 18th century	The cowhouse is timber framed and weatherboarded on a plinth of limestone and brick, and has a corrugated iron roof. There are three bays, one storey and a loft. It has two ground floor openings, and one in the left.	II
Beckjay Farmhouse; 52.39240°N 2.89452°W	—	Early to mid 18th century	The farmhouse is in red brick, with a band and a tile roof with raised verges. The main block has two storeys and attics, and four bays, to the left is a small low extension, and at the rear are two wings. On the front is a latticed porch, and two bay windows with hipped slate roofs. The other windows are casements with segmental heads, and there are three gabled attic dormers.	II
Clungunford House; 52.40107°N 2.88613°W	—	1825–28	The house, designed by Edward Haycock, is in red brick, rendered on the sides, with a slate roof and two storeys. The west, entrance, front has four bays, the two central bays recessed with a single-storey colonnade, and the outer bays pedimented. The north and south fronts have five bays, the central bay projecting under a pediment. The windows are sashes, and there are service ranges at the rear.	II
Broadward Bridge; 52.38536°N 2.89039°W		1831	The bridge carries the B4385 road over the River Clun. It is in stone, and consists of two semi-oval arches. The bridge has a cutwater, a moulded parapet band, a coped parapet, and rectangular end piers.	II
Broadward Hall; 52.38384°N 2.89914°W	—	Early to mid 19th century	A country house, probably the remodelling of an 18th-century house in Gothic style. It is rendered with a string course, and has two storeys and embattled parapets. There is a single-storey bay window, most of the other windows are sashes, and at the entrance is a three-storey tower containing a porch with a four-centred arch.	II
