= Listed buildings in Hopesay =

Hopesay is a civil parish in Shropshire, England. It contains 27 listed buildings that are recorded in the National Heritage List for England. Of these, one is listed at Grade I, the highest of the three grades, and the others are at Grade II, the lowest grade. The parish contains the villages of Hopesay, Aston on Clun, and Broome, and the surrounding countryside. Most of the listed buildings are houses, cottages, farmhouses, and farm buildings, many of which are timber framed dating from the 15th to the 17th centuries. The other listed buildings are a church, a bridge, four milestones and a telephone kiosk.

== Key ==
Grade	Criteria
I	Buildings of exceptional interest, sometimes considered to be internationally important
II	Buildings of national importance and special interest

== Buildings ==
Name and location	Photograph	Date	Notes	Grade
St Mary's Church; 52.44406°N 2.89994°W		c. 1200	The church was restored in about 1880. It is built in limestone with tile roofs, and consists of a nave, a south porch, a chancel with a north organ chamber and lean-to, and a west tower. The tower is low and squat with buttresses, slit windows, a clock face on the east side, and a roof consisting of a truncated pyramid, a louvred bell stage, and a smaller pyramidal roof. The south doorway has a rounded head, the left capital has leaf decoration, and the right capital is scalloped. Some of the windows are lancets and other are in Decorated style.	I
1 and 2 Brook Cottage; 52.43049°N 2.89490°W	—	14th or 15th century	A house that was later remodelled and extended, and divided into two dwellings. It is in roughcast timber framing with cruck construction on a limestone plinth, the right gable end is in limestone, and the roof is slated. There are two storeys and four bays. The doorway has a gabled hood, and the windows are casements.	II
2 Broome; 52.42277°N 2.88325°W	—	14th or 15th century	The house was refashioned in the 17th century and altered in the late 20th century. It is timber framed with cruck construction on a rendered stone plinth, the infill is in brick, which is partly painted and partly rendered, there is oak shingle on the upper floor, and the roof is in asbestos slate. There are two storeys and probably three bays. The windows are casements, and inside are two full cruck trusses.	II
4 and 5 Broome; 52.42211°N 2.88291°W	—	Late 15th or early 16th century	A pair of houses with timber framed cores. No. 4 is the older, roughcast at the front, in limestone elsewhere, and with a slate roof. It consists of a hall range with one storey and an attic, and a two bay two-storey cross-wing. No. 5 dates from the late 17th century, and is encased in red brick with some rendering, on a chamfered stone plinth. It has two storeys and an attic. The windows in both houses are casements, and there is a gabled eaves dormer in No. 4.	II
3 and 6 Broome; 52.42230°N 2.88354°W	—	Late 16th or 17th century	A farmhouse, later two dwellings, it was altered and extended in the 19th century. The original part is in roughcast timber framing on a sandstone plinth, there are extensions in limestone, rebuilding in red brick, and the roof is tiled. There are two storeys, and an L-shaped plan, consisting of a main range, a wide gableted range at the rear, and a lower range to the left of the main range, with a short range projecting to the right. The windows are casements, and there is a 19th-century canted bay window.	II
Broome Farmhouse; 52.42159°N 2.88354°W	—	Early 17th century	The farmhouse was later remodelled and extended. The original part is timber framed and rendered, the later parts are in limestone and in brick, and the roofs are slated. There are two storeys and an attic, a three-bay main range, and a full-length 19th-century outshut at the rear. The windows are casements, and in the outshut are two gabled eaves dormers. Above the door is a rectangular fanlight.	II
Oaker; 52.42888°N 2.90705°W		Early 17th century	The farmhouse was later altered and extended, mainly in the 19th century. It is in roughcast and rendered timber framing, with cladding and rebuilding in brick, and has slate roofs. There are two storeys, and a U-shaped plan, consisting of a three-bay hall range, a left cross-wing with a jettied upper floor, and a 19th-century extension on the right. There is a central doorway with a segmental-headed rectangular fanlight, the windows are casements, and there is a French window. At the rear are two projecting gables.	II
Barn east of 2 Broome; 52.42242°N 2.88315°W	—	Mid 17th century	The barn was altered in the 19th century and later. It is timber framed with cladding and a roof in corrugated iron. There are four bays, and the barn contains three wide openings with hatches, and a wide vehicle entrance.	II
Barn, Barlow Home Farm; 52.45023°N 2.90932°W	—	Mid 17th century	The barn is timber framed with brick infill, weatherboarding and corrugated iron cladding on a stone plinth, and with a corrugated iron roof. It has an L-shaped plan, with a main range of four bays, and a later range to the south. The barn contains opposing double doors and eaves hatches.	II
Hopesay Farmhouse; 52.44443°N 2.89829°W	—	17th century	The farmhouse was altered in the 18th century and later. The early parts are timber framed with rendered infill on a brick plinth, the later parts are in brick and limestone and are partly roughcast or rendered, and the roof is slated. There are two storeys, an L-shaped plan with a gabled rear wing and a lean-to at the rear. The windows are casements.	II
The Malthouse and Malthouse Cottage; 52.42972°N 2.89609°W		Mid 17th century	At one time a malthouse, then a shop, and then two houses, the building was altered and extended in the 19th century. The earliest part is timber framed with rendered infill, the plinth and additions are in limestone, and the roof is tiled. There are two storeys and under the former malthouse is a semi-basement. There is one mullioned window, and the other windows are casements. To the right external steps lead up to a doorway, and there is another doorway beneath.	II
Barn west of 3 and 6 Broome; 52.42234°N 2.88412°W	—	Late 17th century	The barn is timber framed with weatherboarding, and has a corrugated iron roof. It contains wide opposing double doors.	II
Barn northeast of Oaker; 52.42908°N 2.90682°W	—	Late 17th century (probable)	The barn, which was extended later, is timber framed with weatherboarding on a stone plinth and with a slate roof. It contains two doorways and two eaves hatches.	II
Cottage west of Oaker; 52.42884°N 2.90747°W	—	Late 17th century	The cottage was altered and extended in the 19th century. It is timber framed with brick infill, partly rendered, on a stone plinth, and with a slate roof. Originally with two bays, it has been extended to the south. The windows are casements.	II
Thatch Cottage; 52.45416°N 2.90173°W	—	Late 17th century (probable)	The cottage is in rendered timber framing on a stone plinth, and has a thatched roof. There are two storeys and two bays, a central gabled porch, and casement windows. Inside is an inglenook fireplace.	II
Brook House; 52.44568°N 2.89435°W	—	Mid 18th century (probable)	A farmhouse, later a private house, it is in limestone with quoins, a moulded eaves cornice, and a tile roof. There are two storeys, an attic and a half-cellar, and three bays. At the centre is a flat-roofed porch, and the windows are casements with segmental heads.	II
4 Clun Road; 52.42884°N 2.89263°W		Late 18th century (probable)	An estate cottage, it is in limestone, and has a conical slate roof. There are two storeys, a circular plan, casement windows and a tall narrow window, and a round-headed doorway with a semicircular fanlight.	II
5 Mill Street; 52.43107°N 2.89315°W	—	Late 18th century (probable)	An estate cottage, it is in limestone with a dentilled eaves cornice and a conical slate roof. There are two storeys, a circular plan, casement windows, a later canted bay window, and a gabled timber porch.	II
The Old Court House; 52.42949°N 2.89437°W	—	Late 18th century	A farmhouse, later a private house, it is in limestone with a dentil eaves cornice and a slate roof. There are two storeys, an attic and a cellar, a front of three bays, and a three-storey extension to the rear with a parapet. In the centre of the front is a pediment with a lunette, and the windows are sashes.	II
The Old Farmhouse; 52.44519°N 2.89862°W	—	Late 18th century	The farmhouse, later a private house, is in rendered limestone on a chamfered plinth, with quoins, a moulded eaves cornice at the front, a dentilled eaves cornice at the rear, and a double-span roof with coped verges. There are two storeys, an attic and cellar, and three bays. Three semicircular steps lead up to the central doorway, which has pilasters and a rectangular fanlight with Gothic tracery. The windows are casements with segmental heads, and there are two gabled eaves dormers, between which are a pediment with a lunette.	II
Bridge at NGR SO3922581119; 52.42469°N 2.89514°W		Early 19th century (probable)	The bridge carries a road over the River Clun. It is in limestone and consists of a single semicircular arch. The bridge has voussoirs and a coped parapet.	II
Aston Hall; 52.43050°N 2.89635°W		c. 1830	The house, later divided into flats, is roughcast, and has sill bands, a moulded eaves cornice, a parapet, and a hipped slate roof. There are three storeys and sides of five bays, with three gables at the rear. In the centre is a porch with two pairs of fluted Greek Doric columns, and a moulded entablature with metopes and triglyphs. The doorway has a rectangular fanlight, and the windows are sashes.	II
Milestone at N.G.R. SO3632082201; 52.43416°N 2.93815°W	—	Mid 19th century	The milestone is on the northeast side of the B4385 road. It is in limestone with a round top, and inscribed with the distances in miles to Bishop's Castle and Craven Arms.	II
Milestone at N.G.R. SO 3748 8137; 52.42672°N 2.92061°W	—	Mid 19th century	The milestone is on the north side of the B4368 road. It is in limestone with a round top, and inscribed with the distances in miles to Bishop's Castle, Clun and Craven Arms.	II
Milestone at N.G.R. SO 3902 8174; 52.43019°N 2.89844°W	—	Mid 19th century	The milestone is on the north side of the B4368 road. It is in limestone with a round top, and inscribed with the distances in miles to Bishop's Castle, Clun and Craven Arms.	II
Milestone at N.G.R. SO 40486 81927; 52.43218°N 2.87645°W	—	Mid 19th century	The milestone is on the north side of the B4368 road. It is in limestone with a round top, and inscribed with the distances in miles to Bishop's Castle, Clun and Craven Arms.	II
Telephone kiosk 52.44440°N 2.89838°W		1935	A K6 type telephone kiosk, designed by Giles Gilbert Scott. Constructed in cast iron with a square plan and a dome, it has three unperforated crowns in the top panels.	II
