= Clungunford =

Village in Shropshire, England

Coordinates: 52.403°N 2.887°W

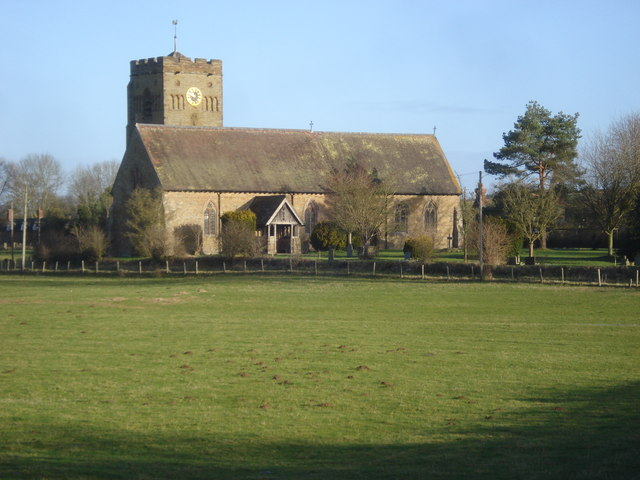
- St Cuthbert's Church

- Location within Shropshire
- Population: 316 (2011 Census)
- OS grid reference: SO396787
  - London: 160 miles (257 km)
- Civil parish: Clungunford
- Unitary authority: Shropshire
- Ceremonial county: Shropshire
- Region: West Midlands
- Country: England
- Sovereign state: United Kingdom
- Post town: CRAVEN ARMS
- Postcode district: SY7
- Dialling code: 01588
- Police: West Mercia
- Fire: Shropshire
- Ambulance: West Midlands
- UK Parliament: Ludlow
- Website: clungunford.com

Clungunford is a village and civil parish in south Shropshire, England, located near the border with Herefordshire.

== Village ==
The village features St. Cuthbert's parish church. The River Clun flows just to the west of the village and can be crossed here by Clungunford Bridge. There are no pubs or shops in present times.

The village hall ("Clungunford Village Hall"), was built in the 1930s as a reading room and community centre. It is managed by a charity and underwent a full refurbishment in 2019. A mobile Post office visits on Thursday for an hour from 11.45 in the car park outside the Village Hall.

The church (St Cuthbert's) is located on the western edge of the settlement, adjacent to the flood plain of the Clun.

The 740 bus service calls at Clungunford, with three buses a day to Ludlow and Knighton.

=== Etymology ===
The name derives from when this part of the Clun Valley was owned by the Saxon Lord Gunward and so was called "Clun Gunward" (meaning the place on the Clun owned by Gunward). It is written in the Domesday Book of 1086 as "Clone Gunward". The second part of the Gunward name (the "ward" element) became corrupted over time to become "ford", and it is a common mistake to believe a ford across the river is responsible for this part of the modern place name (although a ford did once exist where the present-day bridge crosses the Clun). Conversely, the nearby hamlet of Broadward has experienced the opposite change – its second element was "ford" and this became "ward".

The village continues to be called by some locals Gunnas - a variation of Gunward. The village's bi-monthly newsletter is called The Gunnas Gazette and a residential cul-de-sac is named Upper Gunnas Close.

=== History ===
The Domesday Book (1086) records 36 households in Clungunford, making it a large settlement for its time.

There is an old motte, to the northeast of St Cuthbert's churchyard, which guarded the crossing of the river here during medieval times. It is open to the public via a permissive footpath.

Salusbury Pryce Humphreys, notable officer in the Royal Navy, was born in Clungunford (at the Rectory) in 1778.

The present Clungunford Bridge was built in 1935 and replaced a bridge built in 1657.

=== Geography ===
Clungunford lies at an elevation of between 130m and 145m above sea level.

The village is approximately 1 1/2 miles (2.4 km) from the railway stations at Hopton Heath and Broome (both on the Heart of Wales Line). The B4367 road passes through the village and crosses the Clun on Clungunford Bridge.

The nearest market town is Craven Arms, 4 miles (6.4 km) distant by road. The larger town of Ludlow is 10 miles (16 km) distant, whilst Shrewsbury, the county town, is 24 miles (39 km) away.

== Parish ==
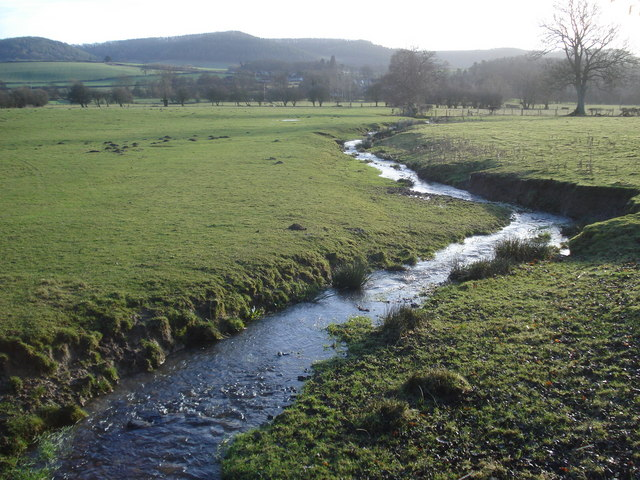
View across Clungunford parish countryside.

=== Geography ===
The civil parish of Clungunford has an area of 1,343 hectares (3,320 acres). In addition to the village of Clungunford, the parish includes the hamlets of Abcott, Beckjay, Broadward, Hopton Heath (with its railway station) and Shelderton, as well as a number of outlying farms and houses including Rowton Grange, The Crossways, and part of Twitchen. The population of the parish as of the 2011 census was 316.

The River Clun, which flows through the parish from the north to the south, divides the parish into two almost equal parts. The parish borders the county of Herefordshire to the south. The northwest corner of the parish (the locality of Hope, on the east slope of Clunbury Hill) falls within the Shropshire Hills AONB, but the village itself does not. The highest point in the parish is Goat Hill (in the northeast corner) at 312 metres (1,024 ft); the lowest point is where the Clun exits the parish (and county) south of Broadward, at 122 metres (400 ft).

Neighbouring civil parishes are Clunbury, Craven Arms (formerly Stokesay), Hopesay, Hopton Castle, Leintwardine (Herefordshire), and Onibury.

The parish forms part of the Clun electoral division, which elects one councillor to Shropshire Council, the local council based in the county town, Shrewsbury.

=== History ===
The course of a Roman road runs through the eastern half of the parish, near to Shelderton, on its way between the Roman fort and settlement at Leintwardine and the Roman city of Viroconium Cornoviorum near present day Wroxeter.

At the time of the Domesday Book, the manor of Clungunford fell within the hundred of Leintwardine, but later came within the hundred of Purslow (the township of Shelderton however fell under Munslow). Abcott, Beckjay, Broadward and Shelderton were medieval townships, whilst Hopton Heath came into being with the coming of the railway in 1861.

In 1884 the parish gained land from Hopton Castle (a part of Lingen Meadow); in 1967 the parish lost land in the southeast (beyond Shelderton Rock) to Onibury parish.

In 1894 it became part of Ludlow Rural District and then in 1974 the non-metropolitan district of South Shropshire. In 2009 there was another re-organisation of local administration, with the creation of a unitary authority (Shropshire Council) covering most of Shropshire.

=== Council ===
The parish council has 9 members. The parish has no wards.

== In culture ==
In A Shropshire Lad, A.E. Housman used - but did not actually write - the verse:

Clunton and Clunbury,

Clungunford and Clun,
Are the quietest places

Under the sun.

== See also ==
- Listed buildings in Clungunford
