= Listed buildings in Bedstone =

Bedstone is a civil parish in Shropshire, England. It contains nine listed buildings that are recorded in the National Heritage List for England. Of these, two are listed at Grade II*, the middle of the three grades, and the others are at Grade II, the lowest grade. The parish contains the village of Bedstone and the surrounding countryside. The listed buildings consist of a church, houses and cottages, and a country house with associated structures.

== Key ==
Grade	Criteria
II*	Particularly important buildings of more than special interest
II	Buildings of national importance and special interest

== Buildings ==
Name and location	Photograph	Date	Notes	Grade
St Mary's Church; 52.37607°N 2.92849°W		12th century	The bellcote dates probably from the 17th century, its spire from the 19th century, and the church was extensively restored in 1878–79. It is built in limestone with a tile roof and the spire is oak-shingled. The church consists of a nave, and a lower chancel with a shed to the north. The bellcote is at the west end, it is timber framed and has a broach spire with a brass weathercock. Two original Norman windows remain, the other round-headed windows and west doorway dating from the restoration.	II*
Manor Farmhouse; 52.37452°N 2.92861°W		Late 14th or early 15th century	A manor house, later a farmhouse, it is timber framed with rendered infill on a stone plinth, and is partly of cruck construction. Later parts are in limestone and the roof is tiled. The house has an H-shaped plan consisting of a central hall range with one storey and an attic, two-storey cross-wings, and a cellar under the three-bay east wing. The windows vary, some are mullioned and transomed, some are casements and there are dormers in the hall range. Inside there is a massive moulded cruck truss.	II*
Red House; 52.37631°N 2.92877°W	—	Early to mid 17th century	A farmhouse, later two cottages, additions and alterations were made in the 19th and 20th centuries. The original house had three bays, it is timber framed with wattle and daub infill, roughcast at the front, on a stone plinth, and with a slate roof. There is one storey with attics, the windows are casements, and in the attics are three gabled dormers.	II
4 Bedstone; 52.37534°N 2.92957°W	—	Mid 17th century	The cottage was later extended. It is timber framed, rendered on the front, on a stone plinth, and has a tile roof. There is one storey and an attic, three bays, a lower extension to the left, and a single-storey range at right angles. On the front are two French windows and three gabled dormers, and at the rear is a gabled porch and 20th-century windows.	II
12 and 13 Bedstone; 52.37580°N 2.92856°W	—	17th century	Originally one cottage with two bays, it was extended to the right in the 18th century and to the right in the 19th century, and has been divided into two dwellings. The building is timber framed with rendered infill on a stone plinth, the extensions are in limestone, and it has a thatched roof. There is one storey and attics, and the windows are casements with eaves dormers in the attics.	II
Bedstone Court; 52.37341°N 2.93028°W		1879–84	A country house, later part of a college, it is in red brick with stone dressings and tiled roofs. There are three storeys, the upper two storeys with applied timber framing, and there is a roughly U-shaped plan. The windows are mullioned and transomed, some in oriels, and many gables, some jettied, and all with cast iron finials. The porch has a central elliptical entrance arch flanked by round-headed arches with Ionic columns. On the south front is full-height polygonal bay window, a veranda and a first-floor balustraded balcony. On the roof is an octagonal cupola with an open balustrade, and a lead-domed cap with a weathervane.	II
Balustrade and steps, Bedstone Court; 52.37325°N 2.93019°W	—	c. 1881	The balustrade is in terracotta on a chamfered red brick base, and is about 40 metres (130 ft) long, with a flight of stone steps towards the east end. It has vase-shaped balusters and rusticated piers, and is surmounted by ball finials and scalloped urns, with lion's heads on the corners.	II
Bedstone Court Lodge; 52.37389°N 2.92638°W	—	c. 1881	The lodge at the entrance to the drive has applied timber framing with rendered infill, a tile roof, and two storeys. The front facing the drive has a jettied first floor and gable. In the ground floor is a casement window with a pedimented head, and in the upper floor is a five-light mullioned window.	II
Gate piers, gates and railings, Bedstone Court Lodge; 52.37382°N 2.92636°W	—	c. 1881	At the entrance to the drive are cast iron gates and gate piers, flanked by low red brick walls with railings curving round to end piers. The end piers are in brick with stone angle quoins, moulded plinths and caps, and flat-topped finials. The railings are elaborately decorated and have gilded ball finials.	II
