= St Mary's Church, Hopesay =

Coordinates: 52.4441°N 2.8999°W

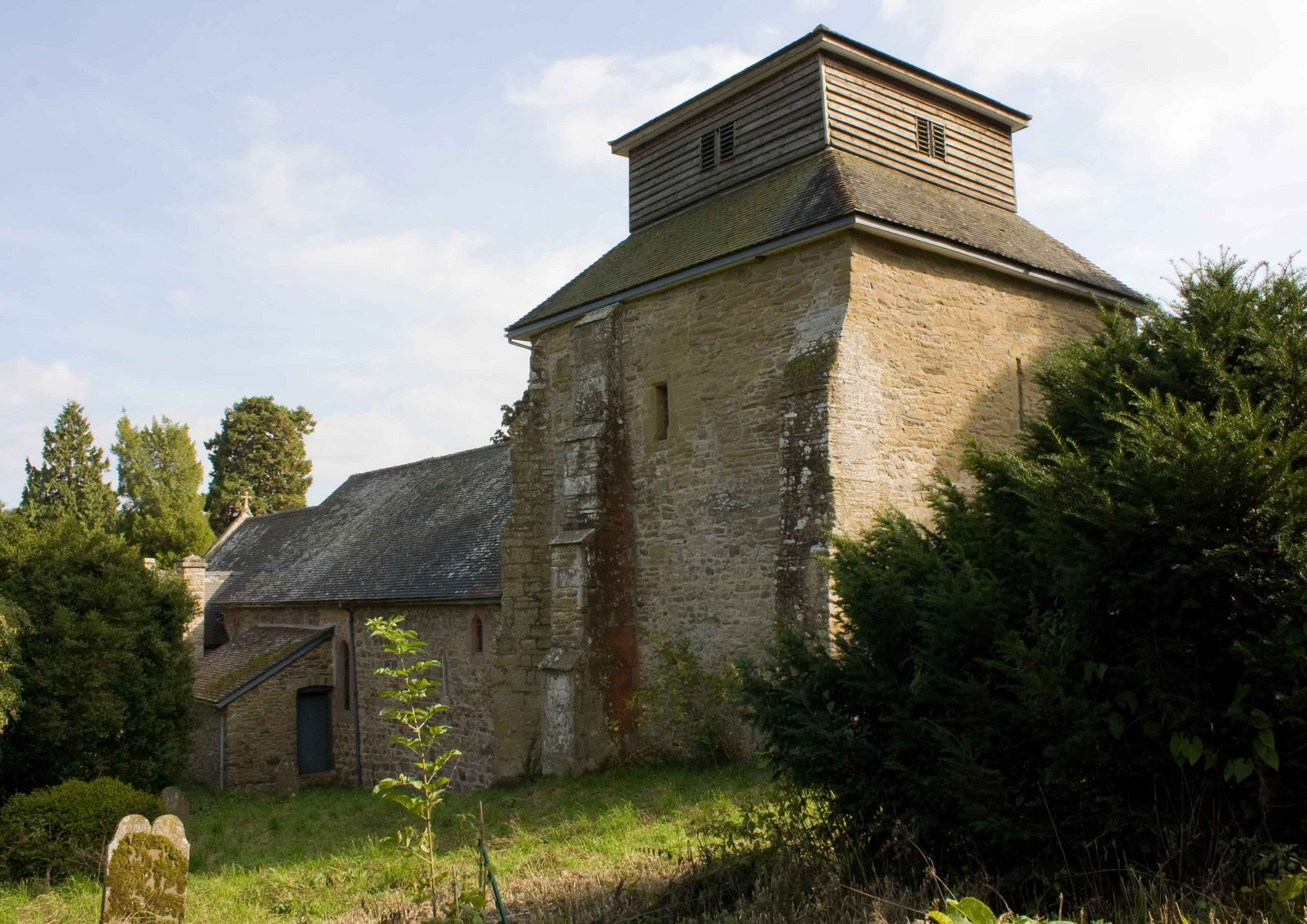
- St Mary's Church, Hopesay, from the northwest

- Location in Shropshire
- OS grid reference: SO 389 833
- Location: Hopesay, Shropshire
- Country: England
- Denomination: Anglican
- Website: St Mary, Hopesay

History
- Status: Parish church

Architecture
- Functional status: Active
- Heritage designation: Grade I
- Designated: 28 May 1987
- Architect: William Butterfield (restoration)
- Architectural type: Church
- Style: Norman, Gothic

Specifications
- Materials: Limestone, tile roofs

Administration
- Province: Canterbury
- Diocese: Hereford
- Archdeaconry: Ludlow
- Deanery: Clun Forest
- Parish: Hopesay

Clergy
- Vicar: Revd Canon Paul G. Wignall

St Mary's Church is in the village of Hopesay, Shropshire, England. It is an active Anglican parish church in the deanery of Clun Forest, the archdeaconry of Ludlow, and the diocese of Hereford. The church is recorded in the National Heritage List for England as a designated Grade I listed building.

== History ==
St Mary's was built in about 1200. There were later additions and alterations, including adding the double-pyramidal roof to the tower in the 17th century. The chancel was restored by William Butterfield in 1886.

== Architecture ==
=== Exterior ===
The church is constructed in limestone rubble with ashlar dressings and tiled roofs. Its plan consists of a nave, a south porch, a chancel, a north organ chamber, and a west tower. The tower is low and broad. It has large buttresses of different types, and narrow lancet windows. The top of the tower constitutes a double pyramid: the lower part is a truncated pyramid, on this is a stage with louvred bell openings, and this is surmounted by a smaller pyramidal roof. On the south side of the nave is a lancet window and two two-light windows containing Decorated tracery. The south porch has stone side walls, an entrance arch in timber, and wrought iron gates. The doorway to the church dates from the 12th century, and is round-headed with a plain tympanum. Its left capital is decorated with leaves, and the right capital with scallops. The south wall of the chancel contains two lancets, a two-light window, and a round-headed priest's door. The east window in the chancel has three lights, and in the north wall are two round-headed lancets. The organ chamber also has lancet windows.

=== Interior ===
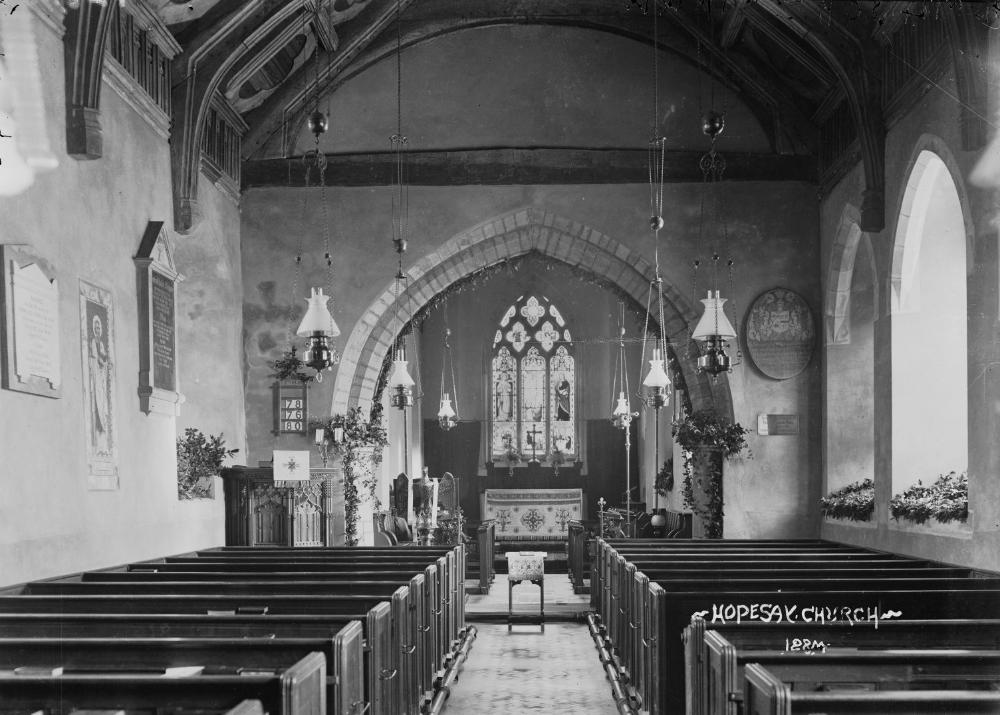
Interior of Hopesay church c.1910s

Inside the church is a west gallery carried on cast iron columns. The nave roof is medieval, and the chancel ceiling is canted with painting in the east bay. In the chancel are a piscina and a sedilia. There are two fonts, one Norman, the other Victorian. The choir stalls and pews date from the 19th century, and contain reused 17th-century panelling carved with flowers and dragons. On the west wall are the Royal arms of George III dated 1776. One of the windows in the south wall of the nave contains 14th-century stained glass. Other windows in this wall have stained glass by C. E. Kempe dated 1903, and by Powell's dating from 1907 and from about 1911. The east window has glass designed by Joseph Bell, dated 1858 and depicting the Crucifixion. In the north wall of the nave is a window by Mary Newell dating from about 1905. The monuments include a painted oval-shaped stone with an armorial device commemorating Whitehall Harris who died in 1751. Elsewhere are other 18th and 19th-century memorials and tablets. There is also a monument by Powell's dated 1904 depicting Mary and John mourning. The two manual pipe organ was made by Peter Conacher, and was restored in 1985 by Nicholson. The church contains parochial war memorials in the form of plaques listing the local dead of both World Wars.

=== Churchyard ===
The churchyard contains two Second World War Commonwealth war graves of a soldier of the Royal Army Service Corps and the ATS. The writer and adventurer Vivienne de Watteville (Vivienne Goschen) is also buried in the churchyard.

== See also ==
- Grade I listed churches in Shropshire
- Listed buildings in Hopesay
