= Calendar house =

Type of manor house

A calendar house is a house that symbolically contains architectural elements in quantities that represent the respective numbers of days in a year, weeks in a year, months in a year and days in a week. For example, Avon Tyrrell House in Hampshire was built with 365 windows, 52 rooms, 12 chimneys, 7 external doors, and 4 wings (representing the seasons). This style was developed during the Elizabethan era and was also prevalent during the Victorian period.

== Examples ==
Examples of the calendar house are very rare and are most often found in European buildings of the late 16th and early 17th centuries.

=== United Kingdom and Ireland ===
Notable examples in Great Britain include Cairness House in Aberdeenshire and Holme Eden Hall in Cumbria. Knole House in Kent has often been said to be a calendar house although as this is a medieval house that grew organically over centuries there has never been any evidence to suggest that it is a calendar house. United Kingdom's National Trust stated that Knole is a large and rambling estate and that it is impossible to determine the exact number of rooms and other architectural features.

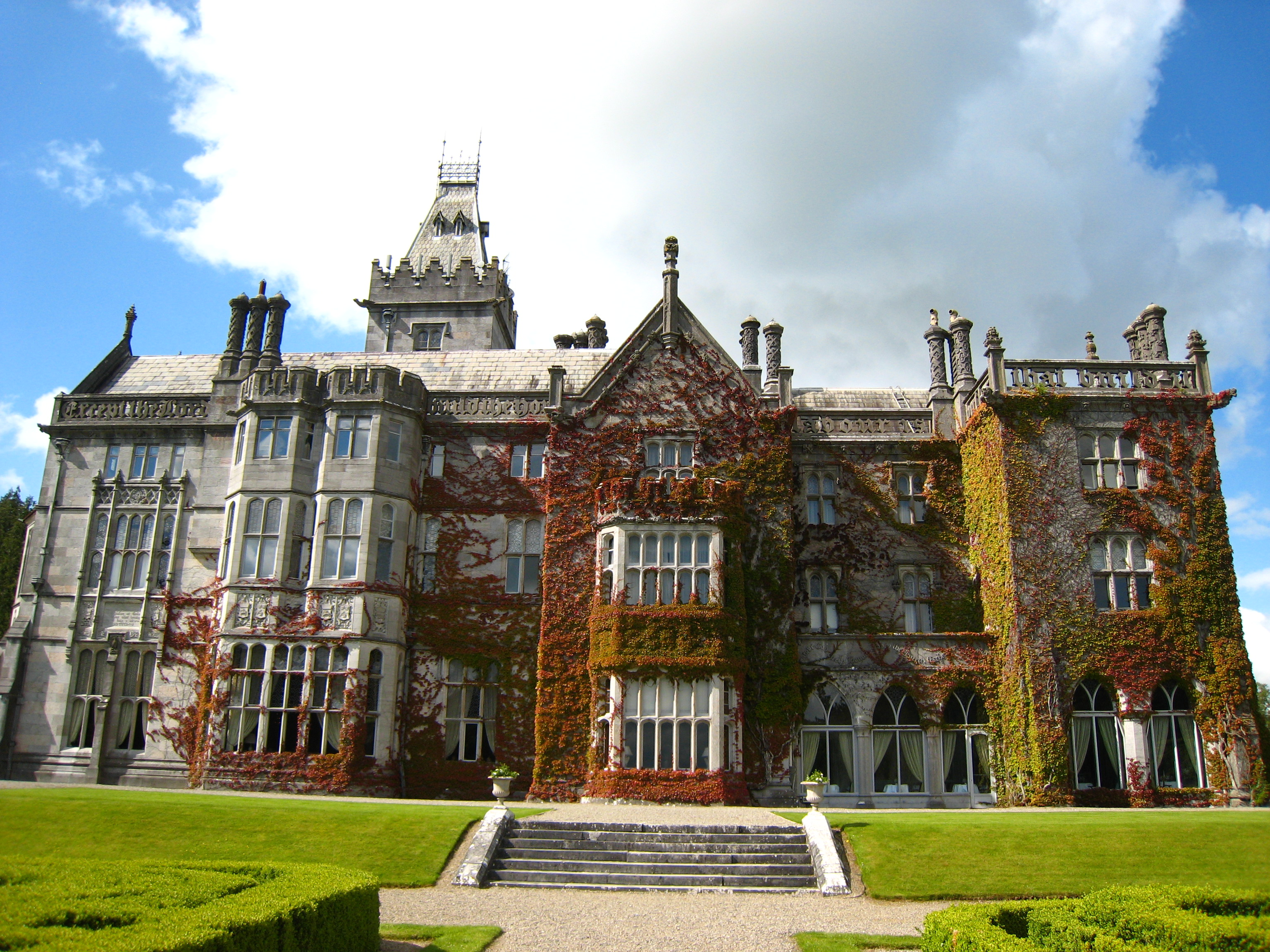
Adare Manor in Adare, County Limerick, Ireland

Bedstone Court, now the home of Bedstone College, is a flamboyant black-and-white mansion, built between 1882 and 1884, designed by Thomas Harris for Henry Ripley, MP and is a calendar house reputed to have 365 windows, 52 rooms (on the first two floors) 12 chimneys and seven external doors. The central hall has a magnificent 52 panelled stained-glass window depicting the months of the year, signs of the zodiac, birds associated with the month and the agricultural activity of the month. The building was heavily damaged by a fire in 1996 but was fully restored.

Adare Manor in County Limerick, Ireland is an example of a calendar house, having 365 stained-glass windows and 52 chimneys. It was designed by the architects James Pain and Philip Hardwick. Much of the interior was designed by E.W. Pugin. There is also Balfour Castle in Scotland, which was constructed in the mid-19th century. It has seven turrets, twelve exterior doors, 52 rooms, and 365 window panes.

Abbey Cwmhir Hall in mid Wales is a notable example of Victorian Gothic Revival architecture, with 52 rooms and 365 windows. Built in 1834 by Thomas Wilson, in the 21st century it is owned by Paul and Victoria Humpherston. It has notable collections and embodies interesting interior design ideas. All 52 rooms are accessible on tours, and everything can be touched.

=== Continental Europe ===
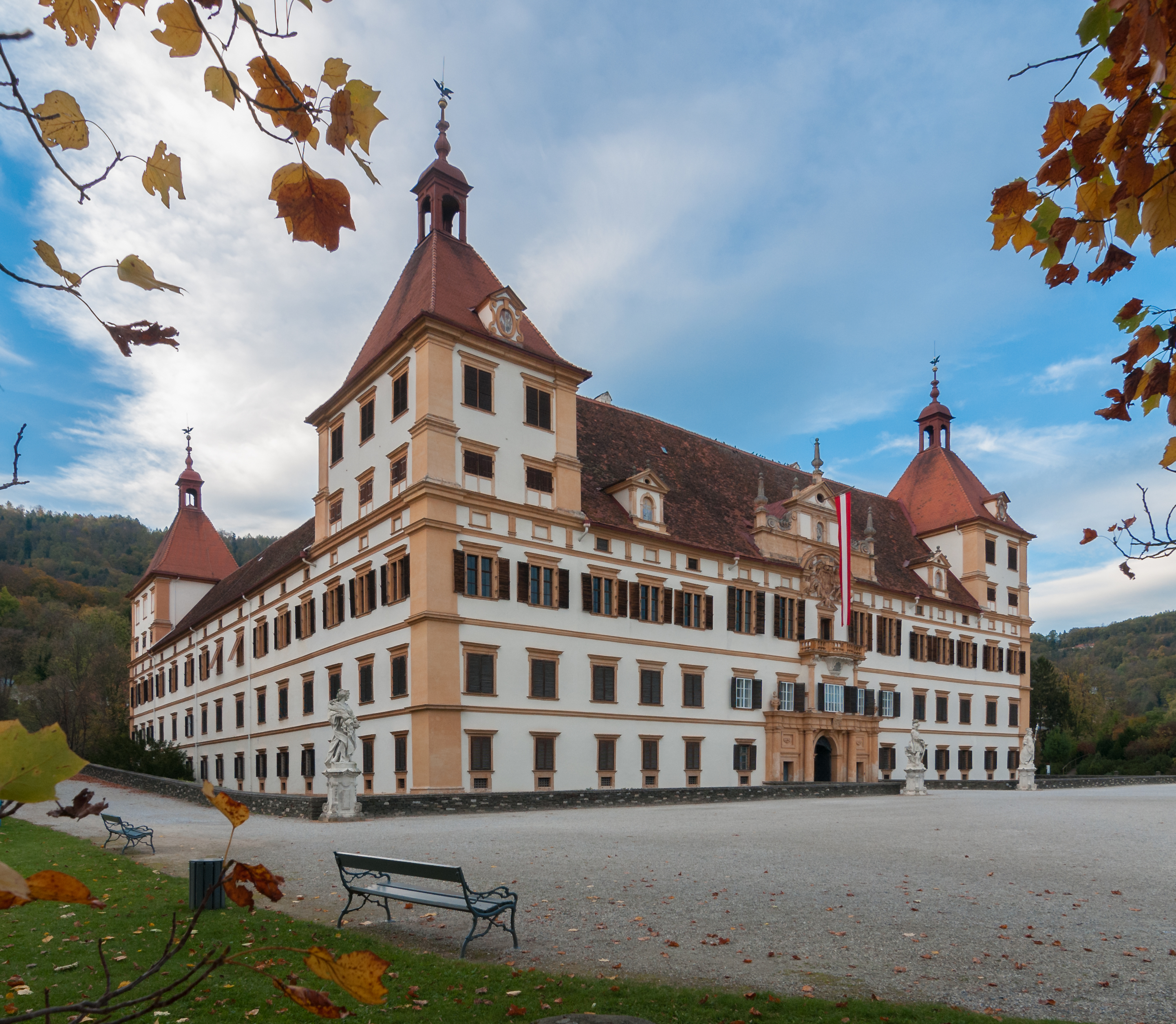
Eggenberg Palace, Graz, Austria

The architectural programme of Schloss Eggenberg in Graz, Austria is based on strict number symbolism. The calendar theme was extremely topical: Schloss Eggenberg was built during the period of the great calendar dispute, which had started at the beginning of the Gregorian calendar reform in 1582 and not yet come to an end. The architecture of the palace is an expression of the values of the time. There are 365 outside windows, which correspond to the days of the year. Each floor consists of 31 rooms, which correspond to the days of the longest months. The 24 hours of the day correspond to the circle of 24 state rooms, 12 on each side of the symmetrical axis, which separates the palace into two corresponding halves, 12 hours for the day and 12 hours for the night. The 24 rooms have a total of 52 windows for the weeks or the amount of Sundays in the year. Adding the 8 windows in the Planetary Room, gives the number 60 which stands for the number of seconds or minutes. There are even 52 doors in the Bel Étage. In the Planetary Room itself, there are the 7 days of the week and the 12 months of the year. And even the park wall has 12 doors opening towards the outside, seven of which face towards the city.

Grad Castle in the north-western Goričko region of Slovenia, with its 365 rooms, is a Central European example of a calendar house.

=== Other countries ===
The large country estate Mona Vale in Tasmania, Australia, built in the 1880s, had 365 windows, 52 rooms, 12 chimneys, and 7 entrances, and is known as the Calendar House.

== Non-house examples ==
A possible Mesoamerican example is El Castillo, Chichen Itza, which is a Mesoamerican step pyramid with 91 steps on each of its four sides. Taking these steps, and adding the temple platform on top as the final "step", produces a total of 365 steps.

The Grand Hotel in Scarborough, England, was designed around a year motif with 4 towers representing the seasons, 12 floors representing the months, 52 chimneys representing the weeks, and 365 bedrooms representing the days. A more modern example is the Millennium Dome (now The O2) in London, where the dome is 365 m in diameter, 52 m high, and has 12 support towers (representing either the hours on a clock face, months of the year, or the signs of the zodiac).
