= Aston on Clun =

Village in Shropshire, England

Coordinates: 52.4301°N 2.8947°W

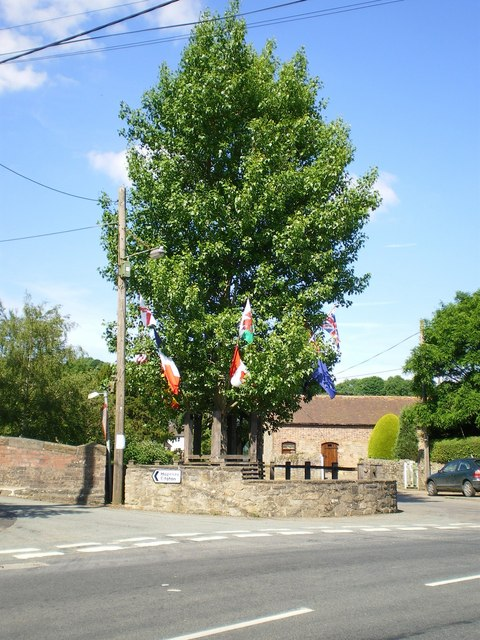
- The Arbor Tree

- Location within Shropshire
- OS grid reference: SO392817
  - London: 162 miles (260 km)
- Civil parish: Hopesay
- Unitary authority: Shropshire
- Ceremonial county: Shropshire
- Region: West Midlands
- Country: England
- Sovereign state: United Kingdom
- Post town: CRAVEN ARMS
- Postcode district: SY7
- Dialling code: 01588
- Police: West Mercia
- Fire: Shropshire
- Ambulance: West Midlands
- UK Parliament: Ludlow

Aston on Clun is a village in south Shropshire, England.

It lies near to the River Clun, with the brook from Hopesay flowing through the village itself, and is on the B4368 road between the towns of Clun and Craven Arms. The village of Broome, which has a railway station, is also close by. It is in the civil parish of Hopesay.

== Amenities ==
There is a public house, the "Kangaroo Inn" (named after a 19th-century Atlantic "cable runner" ship) and next door a small car garage. Until recently, the village had a post office and, since 2013, the village has had a small convenience shop once again, now located by the village hall.

To the rear of the village hall is a large (modern) village green.

== Arbor tree ==
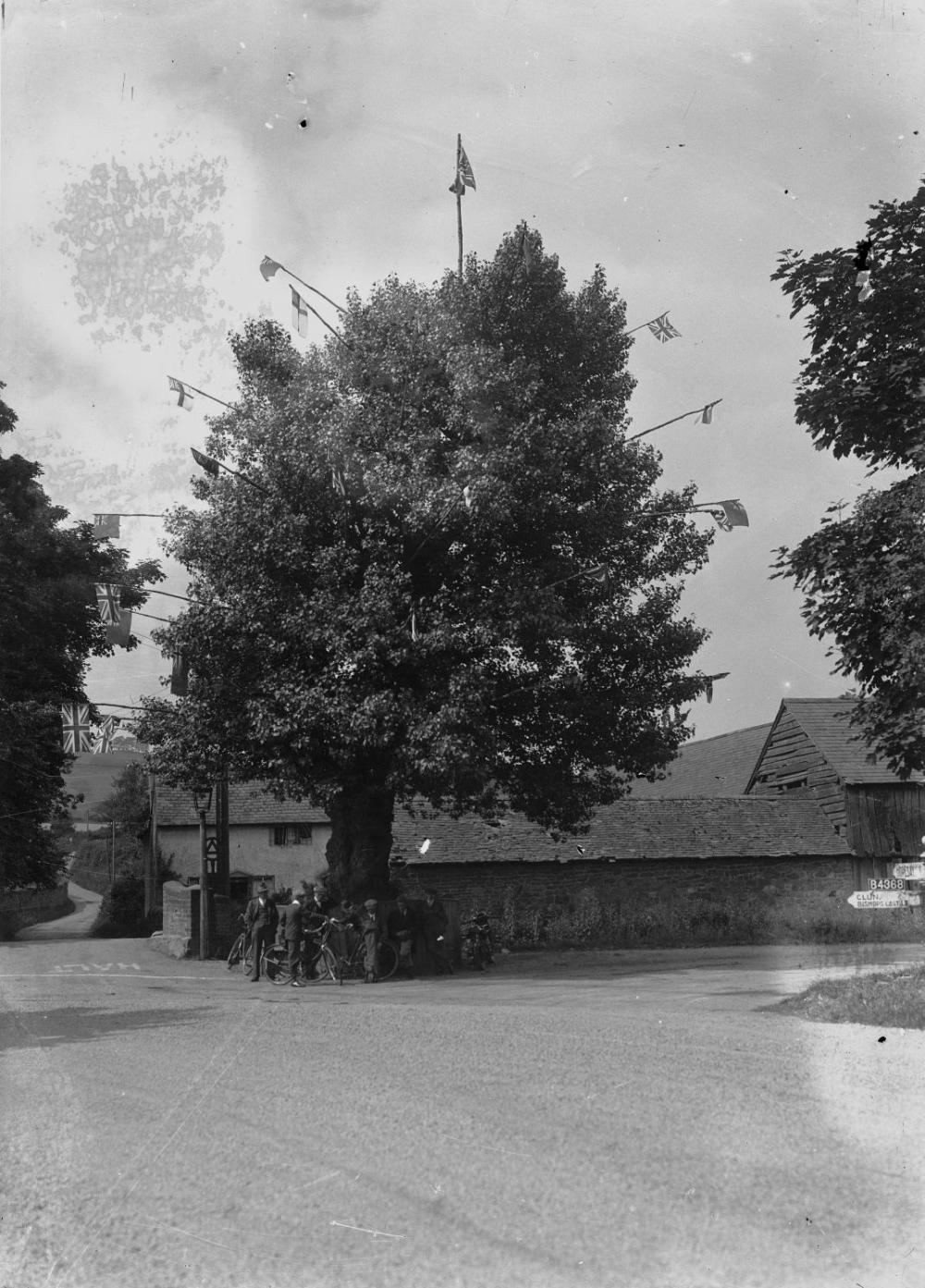
The Arbor tree in the 1920s

The Arbor tree in the village is a male black poplar tree growing beside a stream at a place where four roads meet. The village celebrates Arbor Day, a tree dressing ceremony related to Oak Apple Day, annually on the last Sunday in May. Written records of the Arbor tree only extend back to 1898, but the tradition of dressing the tree is reputed to date back to a local wedding in 1786. The custom has developed and acquired new meanings, particularly since the 1955 when a pageant was devised. The pageant and the celebrations associated with the tree dressing are evolving in response to those living in the local community as well as to the external recognition now accorded to this unique tradition.

The present black poplar grew from a rooted cutting taken from the old tree which was said to be at least 300 years old when it collapsed in 1995 and had been repeatedly pollarded. Black poplar is an extremely unusual tree to be associated with notable events or traditions, which are more likely to involve pedunculate oak, sessile oak, common yew or hawthorn (Crataegus).

The black poplar (Populus nigra var. betulifolia) is an uncommon native tree in Britain. Black poplars are associated with alluvial soils in river valleys and floodplains generally south of a line from the River Mersey to the estuary of the Humber with particular concentrations across the Midlands from the Welsh Marches to East Anglia and notably in the Vale of Aylesbury (Aylesbury Vale). A male clone (cloning) was much planted in the suburbs of Manchester in the late 18th century as it grew well in the polluted atmosphere and it became known as the 'Manchester poplar'. Growing to a height of some 30 metres, the bark of the black poplar is distinctively ridged and furrowed and has characteristic large burrs or bosses. When mature, the tree forms a huge dome of massive spreading branches which arch outwards. This spreading habit is dramatically different from the elongated shape of the Lombardy poplar (Populus nigra 'Italica') which, surprisingly, is a cultivated variety of the black poplar that was imported to Essex from Turin in 1758 and widely planted because of its unusual shape. The black poplar is also a different species from the more widespread black Italian poplar (Populus x euramericana or Populus x canadensis) which is a hybrid between the black poplar and the North American eastern cottonwood (Populus deltoides).

Poplars are unusual in that there are separate male and female trees. Male black poplars are far more numerous than female trees in Britain and seedlings are, therefore, very rare. Regrowth occurs from the branches or trunk of fallen trees which root into the underlying soil. Growing in river valleys and floodplains, the trees can be uprooted by floods and grow again in a new location.

== History ==
In 1949 the Oaker Estate was wound up and auctioned off in small plots as lots. The estate covered almost all of the village and surrounding countryside, including the Kangaroo Inn which was lot number 1. Inside the pub today the original maps, auction documents and deeds of the Oaker Estate sale can be seen.

The present-day post town is Craven Arms; previously Aston on Clun was a post town itself.

== Notable people ==
Folk musicians John Kirkpatrick and Sue Harris lived in Aston-on-Clun during their marriage.

== See also ==
- Listed buildings in Hopesay
