= Bedstone Court =

19th-century country house at Bedstone, Shropshire, England

Coordinates: 52.3734°N 2.9302°W

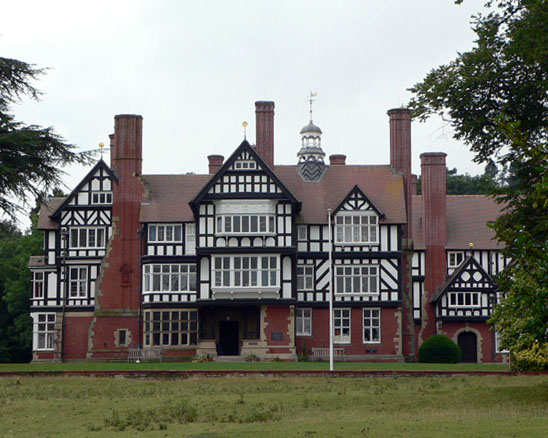
Bedstone College photographed in 2006

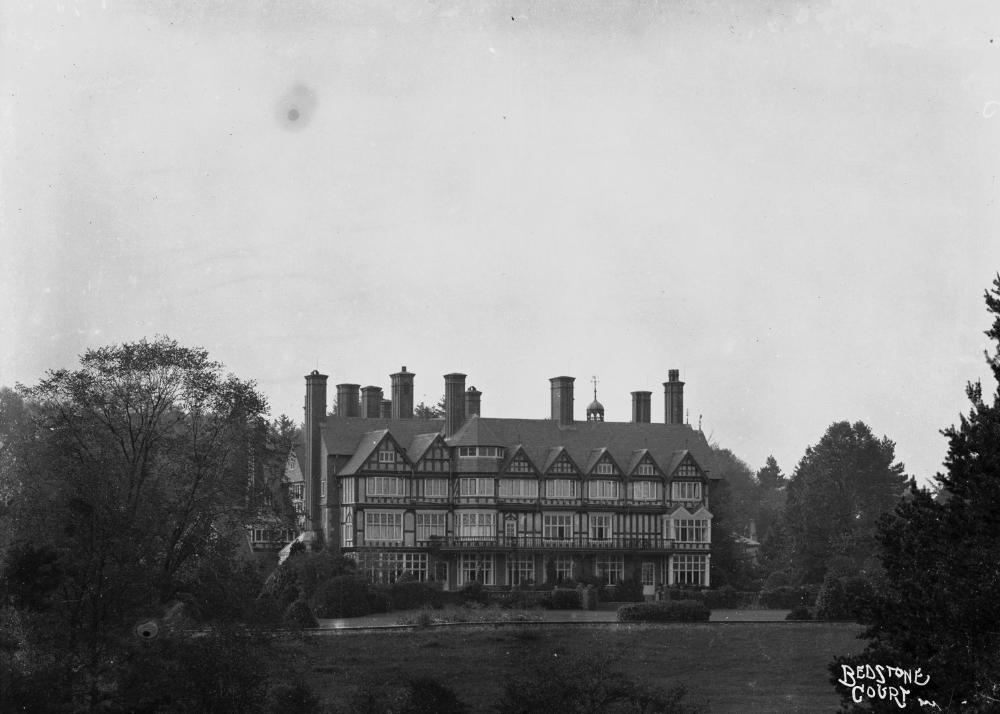
Bedstone Court c.1900

Bedstone Court is a 19th-century country house at Bedstone, Shropshire, England. It was occupied by Bedstone College, a private school, until 2025, and is a Grade II listed building.

The red brick and black-and-white timbered house was built between 1882 and 1884, to a design by architect Thomas Harris, for Sir Henry Ripley, a wealthy Yorkshire industrialist and Member of Parliament. The multi-gabled three-storey house has wooden mullioned and transomed windows and is a "calendar house", reputed to have 365 windows, 52 rooms (on the first 2 floors), 12 chimneys and 7 external doors. The central hall has a 52-panelled stained-glass window depicting the months of the year, signs of the zodiac, birds associated with the months and agricultural activities of the months.

The Ripley family sold the house for educational purposes in 1948. The building was badly damaged by a fire in 1996 but was fully restored and continued to be the centrepiece of Bedstone College, which closed in 2025.

== See also ==
- Listed buildings in Bedstone
