= Hopton Castle (village) =

Village in Shropshire, England

Coordinates: 52.398°N 2.936°W

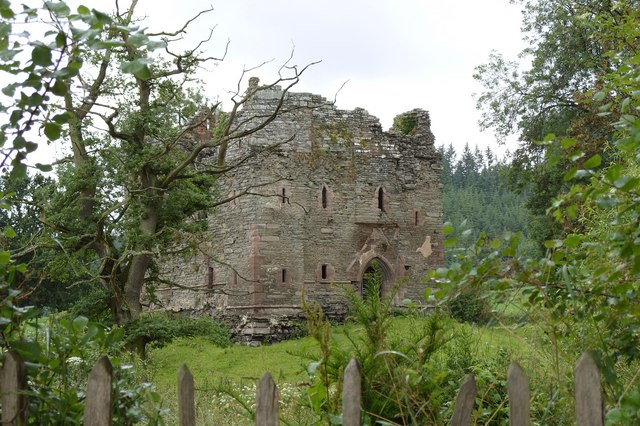
- The Keep, Hopton Castle

- Location within Shropshire
- OS grid reference: SO363782
- Civil parish: Hopton Castle
- Unitary authority: Shropshire
- Ceremonial county: Shropshire
- Region: West Midlands
- Country: England
- Sovereign state: United Kingdom
- Post town: CRAVEN ARMS
- Postcode district: SY7
- Dialling code: 01547
- Police: West Mercia
- Fire: Shropshire
- Ambulance: West Midlands
- UK Parliament: Ludlow

Hopton Castle is a small village and civil parish in south Shropshire, England.

The village grew up around the keep of Hopton Castle, which was opened as a visitor attraction in 2011. Nearby is the hamlet of Hopton Heath, with its railway station on the Heart of Wales Line. Also nearby are the villages of Bedstone, Bucknell and Clungunford.

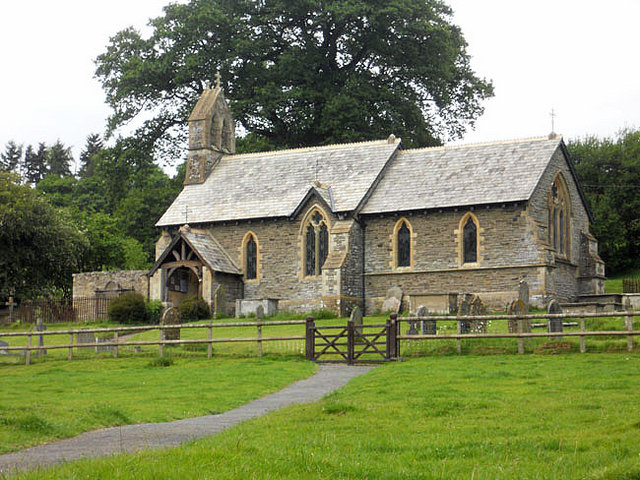
St Mary's church at Hopton Castle

Because of the parish's small population, instead of a parish council it has a parish meeting.

The parish church of St Mary is a Grade II listed building.

== Hopton Titterhill ==
Within the parish, to the southwest of the village, lies Hopton Titterhill, a wooded hill which is open access land. The hill rises to 397 metres (1,302 ft) above sea level, and the summit provides a good view of the lower Clun valley.

== See also ==
- Listed buildings in Hopton Castle
