= Hopton Heath =

Hamlet in Shropshire, England

Coordinates: 52.391°N 2.911°W

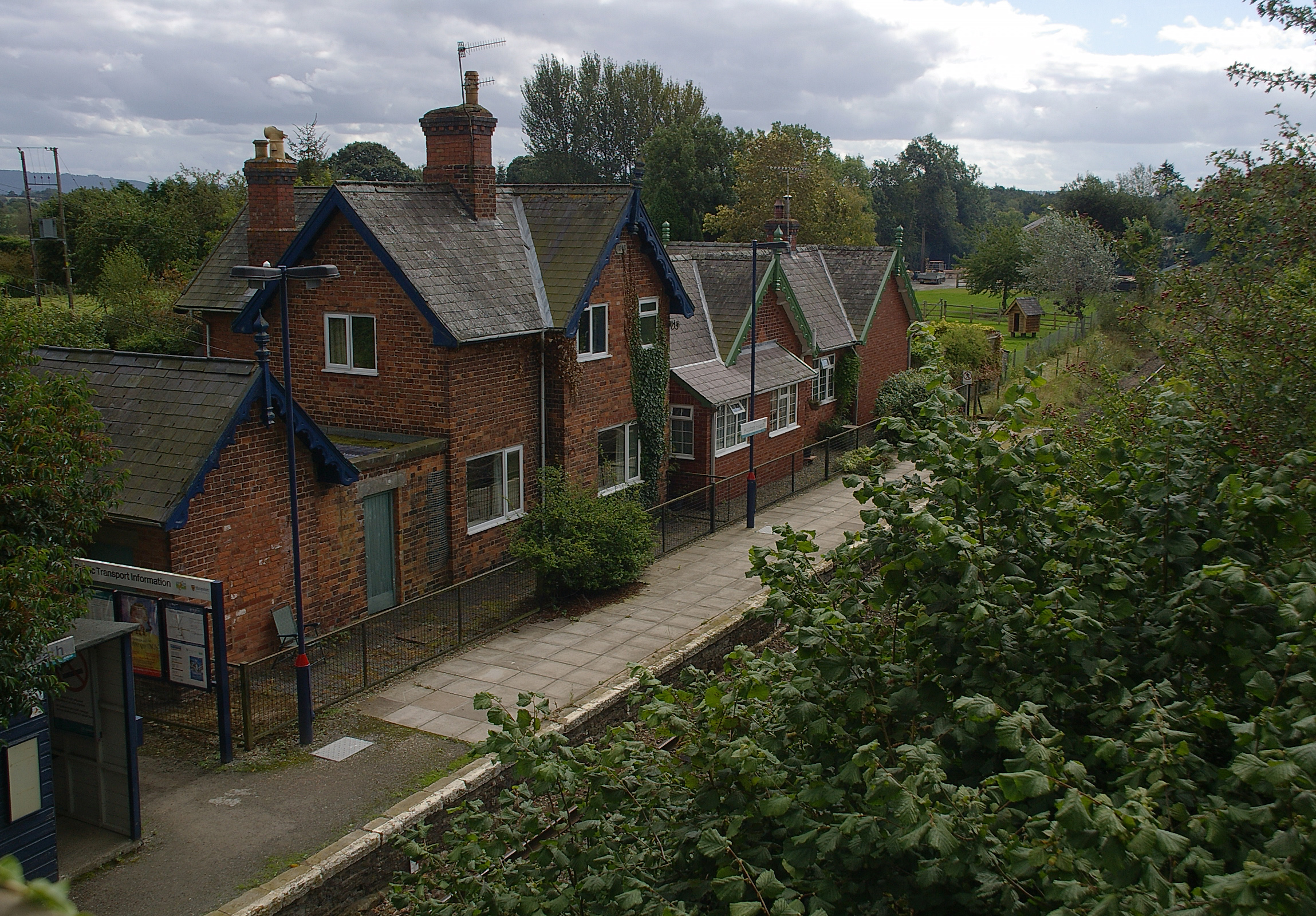
- Hopton Heath railway station, which the hamlet grew up around

- Location within Shropshire
- OS grid reference: SO380774
- Civil parish: Clungunford; Hopton Castle
- Unitary authority: Shropshire
- Ceremonial county: Shropshire
- Region: West Midlands
- Country: England
- Sovereign state: United Kingdom
- Post town: CRAVEN ARMS
- Postcode district: SY7
- Dialling code: 01547
- Police: West Mercia
- Fire: Shropshire
- Ambulance: West Midlands
- UK Parliament: Ludlow

Hopton Heath, or Hoptonheath, is a hamlet in south Shropshire, England. The border with Herefordshire is close by. It lies on the border of the civil parishes of Clungunford and Hopton Castle.

There is a railway station here - Hopton Heath railway station - which today is little more than a halt on the Heart of Wales Line. The hamlet grew as a result of the railway station's construction (in 1861) — it was built to serve the villages of Hopton Castle and Clungunford. Today, a couple of small businesses operate from units near the station and there is also a site of holiday lodges, called "Ashlea Pools".

The B4367 and B4385 roads intersect at Hopton Heath. One mile to the west is the village (and castle) of Hopton Castle, and also nearby are the villages of Bedstone, Clungunford and the hamlets of Beckjay, Broadward, Heath (Herefordshire) and Abcott - with its Rocke Cottage (was Bird on the Rock) tea rooms. The 740 bus service calls at Hopton Heath, with three buses a day to Ludlow and Knighton.

There is a Royal Mail post box at the junction of the B roads.
