= Hopton Castle =

Castle in Shropshire, England

Coordinates: 52.3958°N 2.9318°W

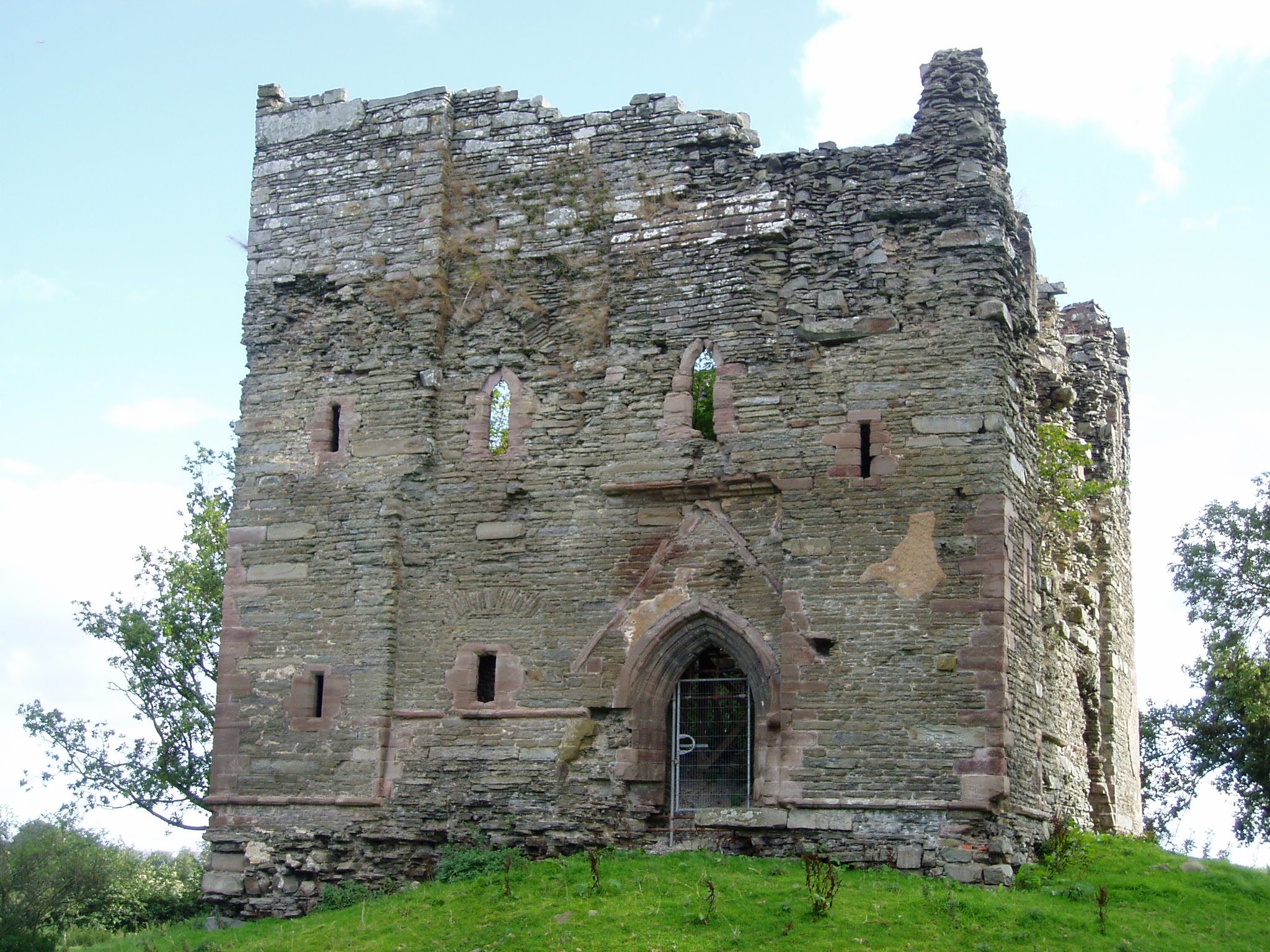
The Keep of Hopton Castle

Hopton Castle is situated in the village of the same name which lies approximately halfway between Knighton and Craven Arms, in the English county of Shropshire. Hopton Castle featured in the TV series Time Team in 2010. A ruin since the early 18th century, it was partially restored between 2006 and 2011, and was officially re-opened to the public as a visitor attraction in December 2011 by the Duke of Gloucester.

== Norman castle ==
The castle may have been founded in the 12th century as a motte and bailey by one of the Hoptons as a mesne lord of the Says of Clun Castle. Walter de Hopton possibly built the stone castle during the Barons' War of the 1260s. The bailey was fortified in stone and a rectangular two-storey keep was built. The last Walter Hopton died during the Wars of the Roses and the castle passed by marriage to the Corbet family of Moreton Corbet castle. From them it passed to Henry Wallop (died 1642) when he married Elizabeth Corbet, daughter of Robert Corbet. He fortified it as a parliamentary stronghold at the outbreak of the English Civil War but died before he could take part in the conflict, leaving it to his son, Robert Wallop, the regicide.

== Civil War siege, assault and massacre ==
During the Civil War Hopton Castle was one of the few castles to be held for the Parliament in the west. In 1644 Sir Michael Woodhouse, with a force of about 500, laid siege to the castle which was defended by about thirty Roundheads under the command of Samuel More. More eventually agreed terms and surrendered.

There are varying versions of what happened next. According to More's account all those who surrendered, apart from himself, were killed and buried. Other accounts vary on how the siege ended. They state that after a three-week siege, More delayed surrendering until the bailey had been taken and the entrance to the keep was on fire, at which point the garrison surrendered to Sir Michael Woodhouse, who at his discretion (his prerogative under the laws of war as they were practised at that time), decided not to grant the majority of his prisoners quarter and they were killed by their captors.

The castle was still habitable in 1700, but fell into disrepair soon afterwards. Substantial remnants of the much altered keep remain.

== Restoration ==
=== Hopton Castle Preservation Trust ===
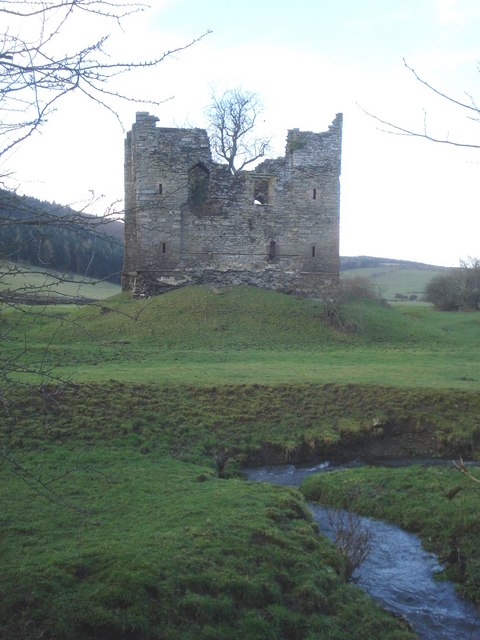
Another view of the castle

In November 2008 the Hopton Castle Preservation Trust (founded in 2006) took ownership of the castle. The trust recently raised one million pounds, half of which was a grant from the National Lottery to fund conservation work and secure a future for the site. (See conservation and repair).

Founding member of the Hopton Castle Preserveration Trust, Tom Baker, was made a Member of the Order of British Empire (MBE) for his services to heritage pursuant to the preservation of Hopton Castle.

=== Time Team ===
The castle was the subject of a Time Team excavation and episode, appearing in series 17 of the long-running archaeology television programme, as episode 6 ("The Massacre in the Cellar") of that series, and broadcast on Channel 4 on 16 May 2010.

The remaining castle keep was excavated over three days by Time Team, clarifying the shape of the castle and the history of its construction. The keep had been captured by the Royalists during the English Civil War. No evidence of a massacre was found.

Time Team had previously excavated and filmed at High Ercall, another Civil War site in Shropshire.

=== Conservation and repair ===
The conservation and repair of the ruin, funded principally by The Heritage Lottery Fund and English Heritage was the culmination of many years of campaigning and fund raising on the part of the new owners, The Hopton Castle Preservation Trust. The works entailed significant structural stabilisation and rebuilding of the masonry and conservation of surviving medieval plaster. During this time a sophisticated and possibly unique garderobe chamber was revealed. As a result of evidence discovered within this chamber it is now believed that a siege breach may have taken place here.

==== The Conservation Project Team ====
- Project Manager: Rayska Heritage
- Architects: Wheatley lloyd Architects & John C Goom
- Engineers: Shire Consulting
- Archeologist: Richard K Morriss
- Contractor: Conservation Building Services Ltd

== See also ==
- Grade I listed buildings in Shropshire
- Listed buildings in Hopton Castle
