= Broome railway station =

Railway station in Shropshire, England

Broome
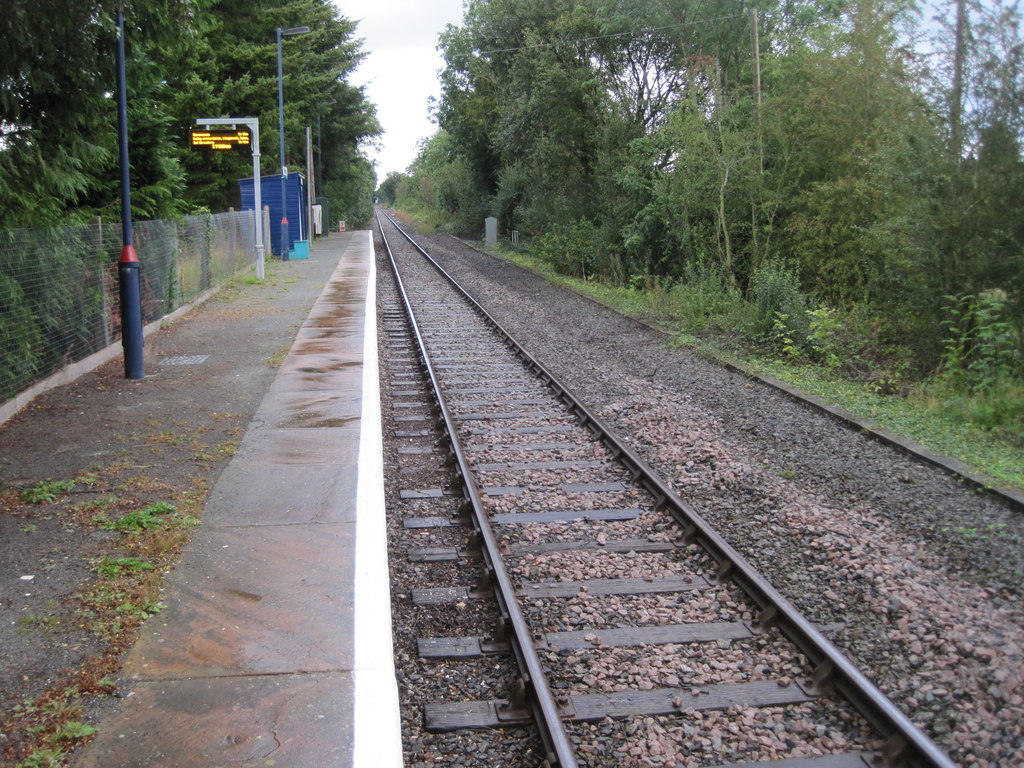

General information
- Location: Broome, Shropshire; England
- Coordinates: 52.423°N 2.885°W
- Grid reference: SO399809
- Manager: Transport for Wales
- Platforms: 1

Other information
- Station code: BME
- Classification: DfT category F2

History
- Opened: 1861

Passengers
- 2021/22: ▲452
- 2022/23: ▲622
- 2023/24: ▲1,300
- 2024/25: ▲1,682
- 2025/26: ▲5,310
Location
Notes
- Passenger statistics from the Office of Rail and Road

Broome railway station serves the villages of Broome and Aston on Clun in Shropshire, England. It is on the Heart of Wales Line 22 3/4 miles (36.6 km) south west of Shrewsbury. Trains that serve the station are operated by Transport for Wales.

== History ==
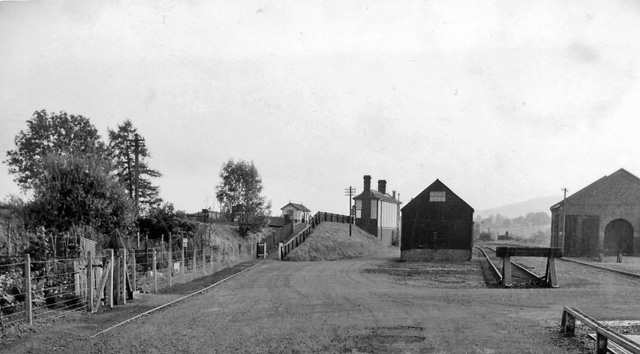
The station in 1963; the passenger platforms to the left and the small goods yard (now a light industrial estate) to the right.

Originally opened as "Broom and Aston". Broome station was built by the Knighton Railway company on their branch line between Craven Arms and Knighton, opening with the line in 1861. In 1895 a wind engine was erected at the station for the London and North Western Railway by John Wallis Titt.

The line was double track and the station had two platforms until the 1960s, but the line was singled in 1965 and the station now has a single platform. The station buildings have since been demolished and replaced with a bus shelter structure.

== Facilities ==
The station has no permanent buildings aside from a single timber waiting shelter, though it does have a CIS display and a timetable poster board. However, it has no public telephone or customer help point. Step-free access is provided via a steep gravel ramp and steel gate from the entrance and car park, which has been proven to be unsuitable for wheelchair users.

== Services ==
There are five trains per day in each direction from Monday to Saturday (plus an extra northbound service to Shrewsbury for commuters on Mondays to Fridays), and two services on Sundays. This is a request stop and passengers intending to board must make a clear signal to the driver, whilst alighting passengers must request the stop from the train guard.

Preceding station	National Rail	Following station
Hopton Heath	Transport for Wales; Heart of Wales Line	Craven Arms

== See also ==
- Rail transport in Shropshire

== Bibliography ==
- Body, G. (1983), PSL Field Guides - Railways of the Western Region, Patrick Stephens Ltd, Wellingborough, ISBN 0-85059-546-0
- Organ, John (2008). Mitchell, Vic (ed.). Craven Arms to Llandeilo. West Sussex: Middleton Press. figs. 12-15. ISBN 9781906008352. OCLC 648080889.
