= Bedstone =

Village in Shropshire, England

Coordinates: 52.375°N 2.928°W

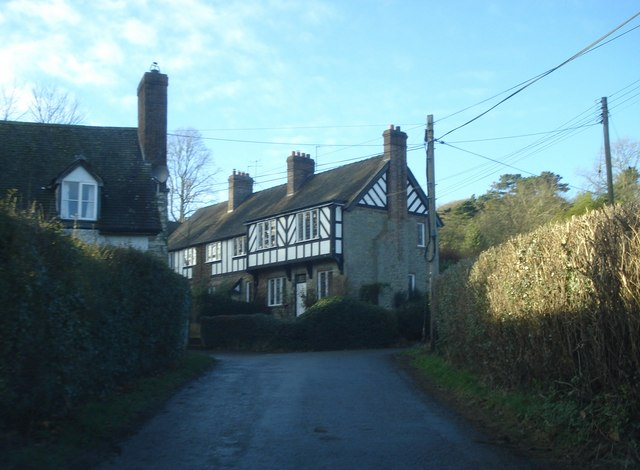

- Location within Shropshire
- Population: 272 (2011)
- OS grid reference: SO369755
  - London: 159 miles (256 km)
- Civil parish: Bedstone
- Unitary authority: Shropshire
- Ceremonial county: Shropshire
- Region: West Midlands
- Country: England
- Sovereign state: United Kingdom
- Post town: Bucknell
- Postcode district: SY7
- Dialling code: 01547
- Police: West Mercia
- Fire: Shropshire
- Ambulance: West Midlands
- UK Parliament: Ludlow

Bedstone is a small village and civil parish in south Shropshire, England, close to the border with Herefordshire.

The village is approximately 1 1/2 miles (2.4 km) from the railway stations at Hopton Heath and Bucknell and is situated just off the B4367 road.

== Bedstone College ==
Bedstone College, an independent boarding and day school founded in 1948, was purchased in 2017 by London & Oxford Group, an asset management and investment banking firm specialising in introduction of Chinese investment to the UK Education sector. LOG reportedly made little or no governance changes to the school and "giving its full support to the current management team at Bedstone." Famous former pupils include the present Astronomer Royal, Sir Martin Rees (whose parents founded the school), now Baron Rees of Ludlow, and explorer and TV presenter Monty Halls. The school's last head was Toby Mullins.

Educating around 220 day and boarding students, the College was not selective and did not require pupils to sit an entrance exam. It offered a broad curriculum from reception through to A Level. Physical education and extra-curricular activities were an integral part of the school week, which included Saturday-morning lessons and five afternoons set aside for sports and a choice of activities.

The school had four boarding houses:

- Bedstone House - for junior girls
- Wilson House - for senior girls
- Rutter House - for junior boys
- Pearson House - for senior boys

Each was run by houseparents who were typically academic staff and their families.

Its campus houses the notable country house that is Bedstone Court. Its founders included the parents of Sir Martin Rees. On GCSE results, the College was the second best non-selective school in Shropshire and the sixth overall.

In 2025, Bedstone College announced plans to close, following changes to the VAT regime for independent schools. The school closed on 11 July 2025.

== Norman Origin ==
St Mary's church dates back to Norman times and features an original Norman font, a timber framed bellcote and a shingled spire, and some of the houses, which include several thatched cottages, are more than 600 years old.

== Other buildings ==
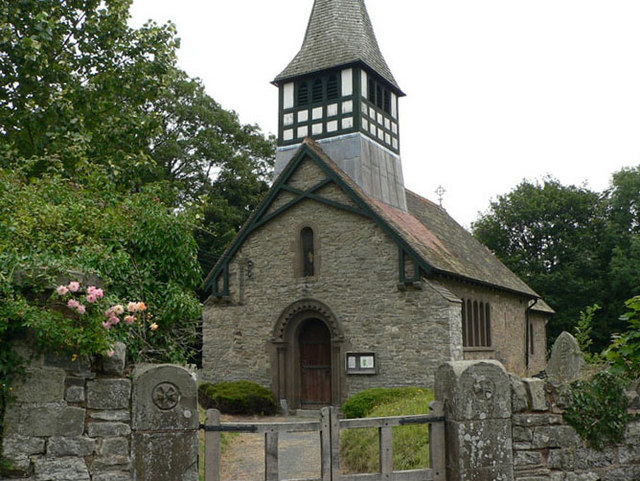
St Mary's Church, the ancient parish church of Bedstone.

Manor Farm house is an example of a timber-framed house and was partly stone-faced in 1775.

Bedstone Court, later the home of Bedstone College, is a more flamboyant black-and-white mansion, built between 1882 and 1884, designed by Thomas Harris for Henry Ripley, MP and is a calendar house reputed to have 365 windows, 52 rooms (on the first two floors) twelve chimneys and seven external doors. The central hall has a magnificent 52-panelled stained-glass window depicting the months of the year, signs of the zodiac, birds associated with the month and the agricultural activity of the month. The building was heavily damaged by a fire in 1996 but was fully restored and remained the centrepiece of Bedstone College, an independent co-educational boarding and day school for pupils from 4 to 18, until the college's closure.

== Amenities ==
Until the 2000s there was a post office but now there is just a Royal Mail post box in the hamlet.

== Parish ==
The civil parish covers a small area, with no other settlements than Bedstone itself. With a parish population of just 85 (in 2001), the parish council has now been merged with that of neighbouring Bucknell parish. In ecclesiastical terms, the church is linked with those of Hopton Castle and Clungunford.

== See also ==
- Listed buildings in Bedstone
