= Hopton Heath railway station =

Railway station in Shropshire, England

Coordinates: 52.3915°N 2.912°W

Hopton Heath
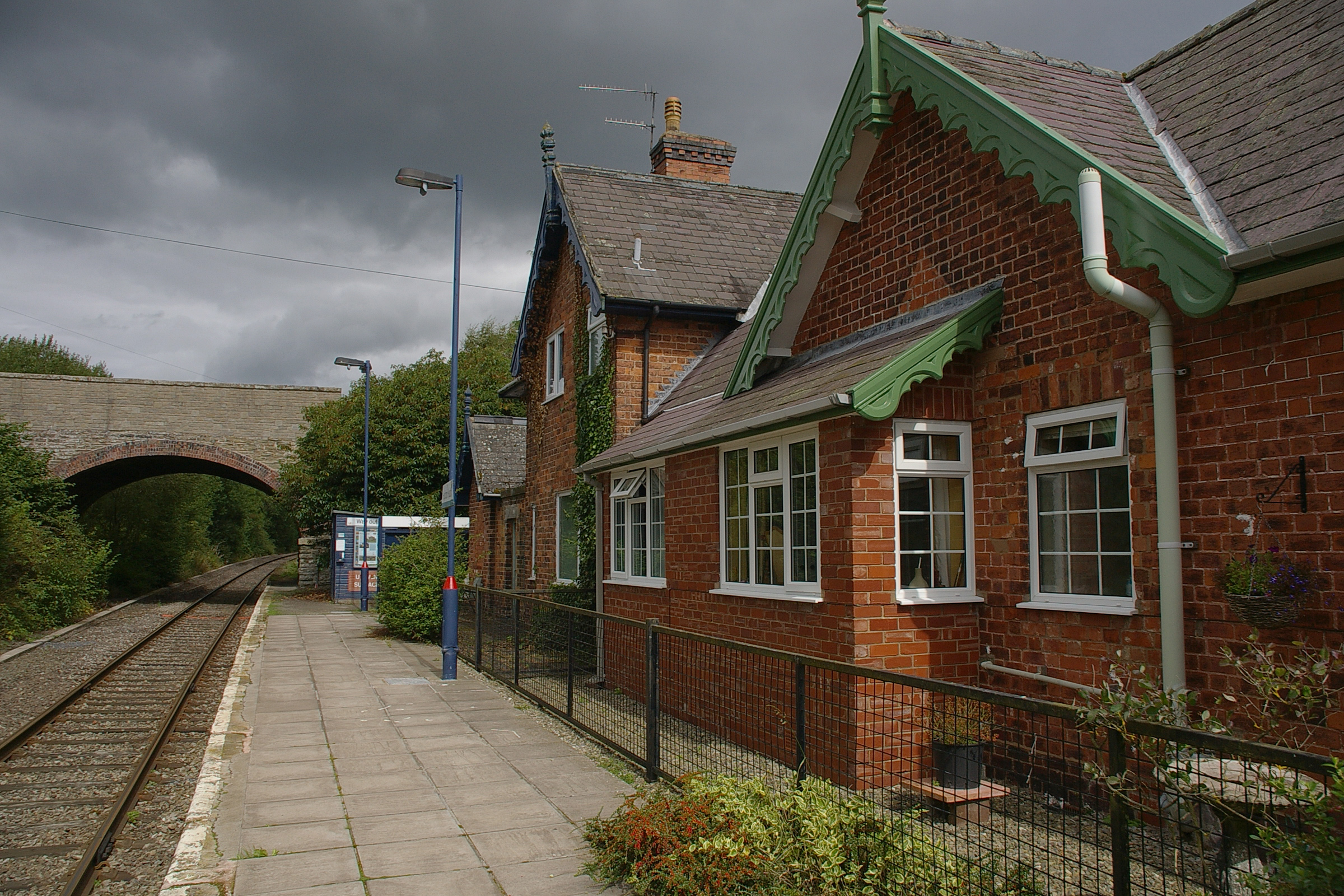
- The original station building and present-day platform, looking north.

General information
- Location: Hopton Heath, Shropshire; England
- Grid reference: SO380774
- Manager: Transport for Wales
- Platforms: 1

Other information
- Station code: HPT
- Classification: DfT category F2

Key dates
- 1861: Opened
- 6 July 2020: Temporarily closed
- 21 August 2021: Reopened

Passengers
- 2021/22: ▲346
- 2022/23: ▲724
- 2023/24: ▲1,292
- 2024/25: ▲2,230
- 2025/26: ▲3,084
Location
Notes
- Passenger statistics from the Office of Rail and Road

Hopton Heath railway station in Hopton Heath, Shropshire, England, lies on the Heart of Wales Line, 25 1/2 miles (41.0 km) south west of Shrewsbury.

The station is in a very rural area: the nearest sizeable settlement is Hopton Castle, and further afield the larger villages of Clungunford and Leintwardine, Herefordshire. The station was for a number of years the least used National Rail station in Shropshire, but passenger numbers have increased and Broome is now the county's least used station.

The station and line were constructed by the Knighton Railway and opened in 1861. Further construction and route openings in 1865 and 1868 subsequently put the station on a through route between Shrewsbury and Swansea.

The railway station is located below street level, to the south of the B4385 road bridge. The original station building is now private housing. Originally there were two tracks running through, but one has been lifted with the "singling" of the line between Craven Arms and Knighton in 1965. In addition to the main building, the station has retained its stone weighbridge hut next to the entrance.

The station has two platforms: the original (but now disused) Shrewsbury-bound platform extends entirely to the south of the bridge; the remaining passenger platform (originally for Swansea-bound trains, but now used for all trains) extends under the bridge, though at present only the part to the south is usually used by passengers.

A wooden waiting shelter is located on the platform, along with CIS display, customer help point and timetable poster board are provided to offer train running information.

Access to the platform is via steps from the road bridge or alternatively via a level footpath (which cycles are also allowed to use) which runs south from the station to the "Ashlea Pools" holiday park entrance.

Due to the COVID-19 pandemic, between 6 July 2020 and 21 August 2021, trains did not call at the station due to the short platform and the inability to maintain social distancing between passengers and the guard when opening the train door.

== Services ==
There are five southbound and six northbound trains a day from Monday to Friday, five each way on Saturdays and two on Sundays. This is a request stop, whereby passengers have to signal to the driver to board or alight from the train. A normal weekday service operates on most Bank holidays.

All trains serving the station are operated by Transport for Wales.

Preceding station	National Rail	Following station
Bucknell	Transport for Wales; Heart of Wales Line	Broome

=== Bus service ===
A local bus service (the 740, run by Minsterley Motors) calls near the station, which travels between Ludlow and Knighton and calls at the nearby villages of Bedstone, Clungunford and Leintwardine. Currently 3 buses per day call at Hopton Heath in each direction.

== See also ==
- Railways of Shropshire
