= Little Brampton =

Hamlet in Shropshire, England

Coordinates: 52.426°N 2.929°W

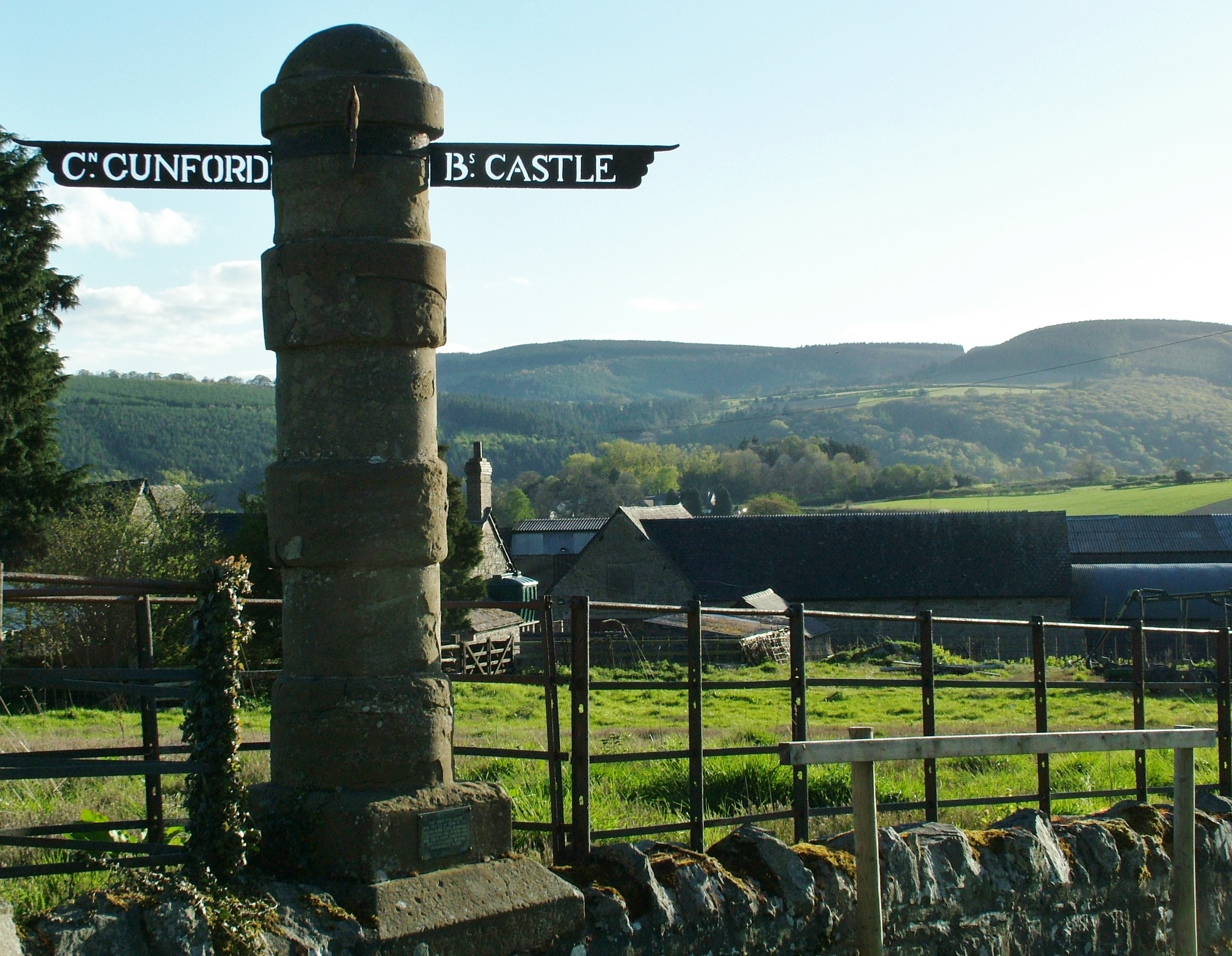
- Crossroads sign and farm, Little Brampton

- Location within Shropshire
- OS grid reference: SO368813
- Civil parish: Clunbury; Hopesay
- Unitary authority: Shropshire
- Ceremonial county: Shropshire
- Region: West Midlands
- Country: England
- Sovereign state: United Kingdom
- Post town: CRAVEN ARMS
- Postcode district: SY7
- Dialling code: 01588
- Police: West Mercia
- Fire: Shropshire
- Ambulance: West Midlands
- UK Parliament: Ludlow

Little Brampton is a hamlet in south Shropshire, England.

It is located between Purslow and Aston on Clun, and is on the border of the civil parishes of Clunbury and Hopesay.

Little Brampton is situated on a notable crossroads in the Clun valley, where the B4385 (from Lydbury North) and B4368 (running between Clun and Craven Arms) roads meet, as well as the lane down to the village of Clunbury. The crossroads is at an elevation of 167 metres (548 ft). The River Kemp flows just to the south of the hamlet; the Clun flows further south near Clunbury.

The road that runs from Little Brampton to the centre of Bishop's Castle (a section of the B4385) is named "Brampton Road".

There is a tea room called The Old Wheelwrights at the crossroads.

By the crossroads is an ornamental road direction sign for local destinations.

== See also ==
- Listed buildings in Clunbury
