= Frank Coutts =

Frank Coutts may refer to:

- Frank Coutts (Australian footballer), Australian rules footballer
- Frank Coutts (rugby union), Scottish rugby union player

== See also ==
- Frank Coutts Hendry, Indian Army officer and author
