= Bicton, South Shropshire =

Hamlet near Clun, Shropshire, England

Coordinates: 52.438°N 3.047°W

Bicton
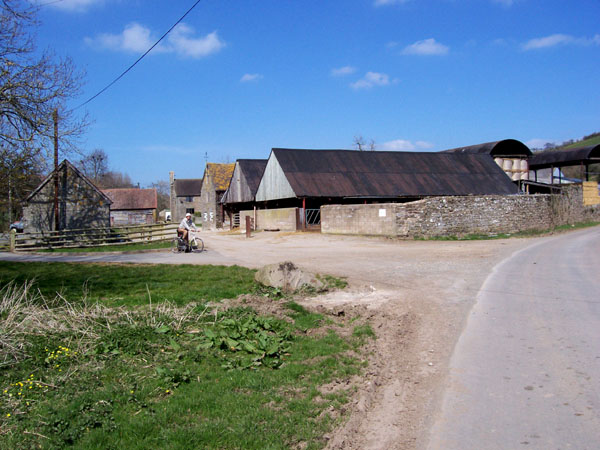
- Bicton Farm

- Location within Shropshire
- OS grid reference: SO288825
- Civil parish: Clun
- Unitary authority: Shropshire
- Ceremonial county: Shropshire
- Region: West Midlands
- Country: England
- Sovereign state: United Kingdom
- Post town: CRAVEN ARMS
- Postcode district: SY7
- Dialling code: 01588
- Police: West Mercia
- Fire: Shropshire
- Ambulance: West Midlands
- UK Parliament: Ludlow

Bicton (or previously sometimes Bickton) is a hamlet in southwest Shropshire, England, one mile north of Clun. The short River Unk passes through the hamlet. In previous centuries it was a township in the Clun division of the hundred of Clun.

The Bicton Burial Circle is a prehistoric stone circle, located south of the settlement between the River Unk and River Clun. Two barrows are seen as circular crop marks. The cremation at the burial site is suspected to belong to the Beaker period.

The hamlet has been in existence for centuries. Although not listed in the 1086 Domesday Book, it is mentioned in county court papers dating from 1221, in which the county ruled that John Fitzalan I, Lord of Clun, was right to claim that Bicton belonged to his fiefdom.

Little remains of Bicton Castle, also known as Bicton Motte, a motte and bailey dating from the 11th or 12th century. The motte's height is 2.2 metres today, as parts have been dug away during gravel extraction. Originally it was circular, with a diameter of 30 metres. The small bailey measured 14 by 25 metres. The castle is classified as E3: "feeble or damaged earthworks". Its location on the River Unk, like its counterpart in Newcastle on the River Clun, suggest it served as a forward defence of Clun Castle against the Welsh, rather than as an instrument of exploitation. When after the Norman Conquest Picot de Say was Lord of Clun, other nearby minor castles such as Hopton and Acton provided him with military service, so it is assumed that the same applied to Bicton Castle.

Records show that agricultural work took place at Bicton at least in the 14th century. Its fields were among the most fertile in the Clun Valley. They were occupied by Welsh bondsmen, unfree tenants farming open fields. It was the location of a demesne sheep stint for 300 animals owned by the Fitzalans in the early 14th century. In 1354 a worker was paid four bushels of rye for spreading dung for seven weeks; and there is a later account of the same activity in 1372. In 1355 sixty Welshmen provided mowing services to the manor at Bicton. In 1373 240 sheared sheep were sent from nearby Clunton and Kempton to the reeve of Bicton. Swapping flocks of sheep between the locations of Bicton, Newton, Kempton, and Clunton was a recurring event throughout the second half of the 14th century. Bicton Farm has been farmed by the same family for centuries. The farm has one of the four water mills on the River Unk. Records from 1919 show activities of agroforestry.

A 14th century court known as "hallmoot of the Welsh" is presumed to have met at times at Bicton. The unfree tenants of the Lord of Clun's demesne were tried here.

== Onslow Park ==
Near Bicton was Onslow Park, containing Onslow Hall, seat of the Earls of Onslow before they removed to Clandon Park in Surrey in the late 16th century.

== See also ==
- Listed buildings in Clun
