= Listed buildings in Clunbury =

Clunbury is a civil parish in Shropshire, England. It contains 64 listed buildings that are recorded in the National Heritage List for England. Of these, one is listed at Grade I, the highest of the three grades, two are at Grade II*, the middle grade, and the others are at Grade II, the lowest grade. The parish contains the villages of Clunbury and Clunton, and smaller settlements including Kempton, Little Brampton, and Purslow, and is otherwise rural. Most of the listed buildings are houses, farmhouses and farm buildings, many of which are timber framed, and some later encased or rebuilt in limestone. The other listed buildings are two churches, one dating from the 12th century, bridges, a stone signpost, three milestones, a former watermill, a former malthouse, a war memorial, and a former smithy.

== Key ==
Grade	Criteria
I	Buildings of exceptional interest, sometimes considered to be internationally important
II*	Particularly important buildings of more than special interest
II	Buildings of national importance and special interest

== Buildings ==
Name and location	Photograph	Date	Notes	Grade
St Swithun's Church; 52.42023°N 2.92646°W		12th century	The church was altered and extended in the 14th, 15th and 18th centuries, and in 1881 it was restored by James Piers St Aubyn when the south porch was added. The church is built in limestone and has roofs of slate and stone-slate. It consists of a nave, a south porch, a chancel, a south organ chamber, and a west tower. The tower has an embattled parapet and a pyramidal cap with a weathervane, and on the south face is a sundial. The south doorway and a window to its right are Norman, and the other windows in the nave are in Decorated style. The east window has three lights and is in Perpendicular style.	I
25 Kempton; 52.44126°N 2.94698°W	—	Mid to late 15th century	The house was later remodelled and extended. It is timber framed with cruck construction and has rendered and brick infill. The right gable end is in limestone, and the roof is thatched. The house has one storey and an attic, the windows are casements, and there are two raking eaves dormers. Inside there are three true cruck trusses, and an inglenook fireplace.	II*
Cwm Farmhouse; 52.41167°N 2.97856°W	—	Late 16th century	The farmhouse was restored in 1989. It is timber framed with red brick infill, and has a tile roof with gables, fretted bargeboards and pendants. There are two storeys, a hall range with 2½ bays and a cellar, and a flush gabled cross-wing. The windows are casements.	II
8 Clunbury; 52.41913°N 2.92582°W	—	Late 16th or early 17th century	A cottage, later used for other purposes, it is timber framed and partly rendered on a stone plinth, with rebuilding in limestone, and a corrugated iron roof. There is an L-shaped plan, with a hall range and a cross-wing facing the street. It is in one storey, with an attic in the hall range, and a lean-to on the cross-wing. The windows are casements.	II
Llan Farmhouse; 52.40777°N 2.95442°W	—	Late 16th or early 17th century	The farmhouse was later extended. It is in limestone with quoins and a slate roof. There is one storey with an attic, originally there were two bays, and it was extended by one bay with a semi-basement to the left. The doorway is approached by external stone steps, the windows are casements, and there are three gabled eaves dormers. Inside there are timber framed cross-walls, and an inglenook fireplace.	II
Old Farmhouse; 52.42574°N 2.98131°W	—	Late 16th or early 17th century	The farmhouse is timber framed with brick and rendered infill, asbestos sheeting on the gable ends and at the rear, and an asbestos slate roof. There is one storey and an attic, and three bays. The doorway has a gabled hood, the windows are casements, and there is a jettied full dormer with a moulded bressumer and carved corner brackets.	II*
The Yews and 4 and 5 Beambridge Road; 52.41904°N 2.92556°W	—	Late 16th or early 17th century	A farmhouse that was remodelled and extended in the 19th century and divided into three dwellings. The original part is timber framed, partly roughcast, with some brick and stone, and a slate roof. It has two storeys and three or four bays. The windows are casements.	II
27 Kempton; 52.44132°N 2.94748°W	—	Early 17th century	A timber framed cottage with brick infill, partly rendered, with a weatherboarded left gable end, a rendered right gable end, and a thatched roof. There is one storey and an attic, three bays, and a single-story extension to the left with a hipped thatched roof. The cottage has a lean-to porch and casement windows, and inside are inglenook fireplaces.	II
Cwm Cottage; 52.41042°N 2.97712°W	—	Early 17th century	A farmhouse, later a private house, it is timber framed with rendered infill on a stone plinth, slate hanging in the right gable end, and a tile roof, hipped to the left. It has one storey and an attic, and four bays. Steps lead up to the doorway, the windows are casements with latticed lights, and there are three gabled dormers.	II
Ivy Cottage; 52.41992°N 2.92734°W	—	Early 17th century	The house was later extended. It is timber framed with rendered infill on a stone plinth, limestone at the sides and rear, and a tile roof. There are two storeys, originally three bays, and a 20th-century extension to the right. On the front is a gabled porch, and the windows are casements.	II
Llanhowell Farmhouse; 52.40587°N 2.96496°W	—	Early 17th century	The farmhouse was considerably extended in the 18th century. The original part is timber framed with brick infill, an asbestos sheet roof, and one storey with an attic. It contains a casement window and a raking eaves dormer. The extension is at right angles at the front, it is in limestone with a slate roof, and has two storeys and an attic. There are three bays, the central bay having a pediment containing a lunette. The other windows are casements, and there is a gabled porch.	II
Moor House; 52.40525°N 2.92856°W	—	Early 17th century	A timber framed house with rendered and brick infill on a plinth of stone and brick, partly replaced in brick on the front, and with a concrete tile roof. It has an L-shaped plan consisting of a hall range with one storey and an attic and two bays, and a flush cross-wing with two storeys and two bays. The windows are casements, and in the hall range are two gabled eaves dormers.	II
Purslow Hall; 52.42152°N 2.94486°W	—	Early 17th century	A former manor house, it is in red brick, and has slate roofs with coped verges, and gables with stone finials. There are two storeys, attics, and a cellar, and an H-shaped plan consisting of a hall range and cross-wings. The windows are mullioned and transomed, and the central doorway has a moulded surround with an armorial shield above.	II
Upper House; 52.41910°N 2.92622°W	—	Early 17th century	The farmhouse, later a private house, was later extended. The original part is timber framed and pebbledashed with two storeys, the later gabled extension to the right is in roughcast stone with two storeys and an attic, and there is a red brick outshut at the rear. The roof is slated, and the original range has three bays. In the ground floor of the original range are mullioned and transomed windows, and the other windows are casements. Inside is an inglenook fireplace.	II
2 Kempton; 52.43943°N 2.94459°W	—	Early to mid 17th century	A timber framed cottage with rendered infill on a very high limestone plinth, with a rendered left gable end, and a slate roof. There is one storey and an attic, and two bays. In the right gable end is a gabled porch, the windows are casements, and there is a gabled eaves dormer. Inside the cottage is an inglenook fireplace.	II
20 and 21 Kempton; 52.44195°N 2.94722°W	—	Early to mid 17th century	A farmhouse, later two cottages, it is timber framed with brick infill, partly roughcast, and with a machine tile roof. It has two storeys, and an L-shaped plan with a two-bay hall range and a cross-wing. Most of the windows are casements, and there is a French window.	II
29 and 30 Kempton; 52.44093°N 2.94778°W	—	Early to mid 17th century	A farmhouse, later a private house, it is timber framed with brick infill and a machine tile roof. It has an L-shaped plan, consisting of a two-bay hall range with one storey and an attic, and a two-bay cross-wing to the right with two storeys. There is a lean-to porch, the windows are casements, and there is a gabled dormer and a raking dormer. Inside is an inglenook fireplace.	II
Clunton Mill House; 52.42469°N 2.98071°W	—	Early to mid 17th century	The farmhouse, later a private house, was extended in the late 18th or early 19th century, and has two storeys. The earlier part has two bays and is timber framed with brick and rendered infill and a corrugated iron roof. The extension has one bay, it is in limestone and has a slate roof. Most of the windows are casements, and there is one fixed-light window.	II
Barn southwest of Clunbury Hall; 52.42055°N 2.92614°W	—	Mid 17th century	The barn is timber framed and weatherboarded, and has a corrugated iron roof. It contains full-height double doors, eaves hatches and doorways.	II
Clunton Farmhouse; 52.42669°N 2.97892°W	—	17th century	The farmhouse, later a private house, was extended in the 18th century. The original part is timber framed and roughcast on a plinth, the extension is in limestone, and there is a slate roof. The house has one storey and an attic, the original part has four bays, and the extension added one bay to the left. There is a gabled porch, casement windows, and two gabled eaves dormers.	II
Cwm Lane Cottage; 52.42306°N 2.97893°W	—	Mid 17th century	The cottage is timber framed with roughcast infill on a stone plinth, the left gable wall is in limestone, and the roof has machine tiles. There are two storeys and two bays. On the front is a gabled porch, and the windows are casements.	II
Fold Farmhouse; 52.42692°N 2.97961°W	—	Mid 17th century	The farmhouse was extended and altered in the 19th century. It is timber framed with rendered infill on a stone plinth, encased or replaced on the front by red brick, and by limestone in the right gable end. There are two storeys, the original part has two bays, with a 19th-century higher single-bay extension to the left in brick and stone. The doorway has a timber gabled porch, and the windows are casements.	II
Barn southwest of Fold Farmhouse; 52.42674°N 2.97968°W	—	Mid 17th century	The barn is timber framed and weatherboarded with cladding in corrugated iron, and has a corrugated iron roof. It has six bays, and contains doorways and eaves hatches.	II
Barn southwest of Moor House; 52.40522°N 2.92896°W	—	Mid 17th century	The barn is timber framed and weatherboarded on a stone plinth with a corrugated iron roof. It has three bays, with a two-bay extension to the west, and a continuous loft. The barn contains doorways and eaves hatches.	II
Olde Church House; 52.42598°N 2.97863°W	—	Mid 17th century	The cottage was extended in the 19th century. The original part is timber framed with rendered infill and a roughcast left gable end, the extension is in stone with applied timber framing, and the roof is slated. The original part has one storey and an attic, and the extension, which has two storeys, is at right angles, giving an L-shaped plan. The windows are casements.	II
Red Hall Cottage; 52.40968°N 2.97513°W	—	17th century (probable)	A farmhouse, later a private house, it was remodelled and extended in the 19th century. The house is in limestone with a machine tile roof, one storey and an attic, and two bays. The windows are casements with lattice glazing, in the ground floor with segmental heads, and above in gabled eaves dormers.	II
The Old Post Office and Holland Cottage; 52.41958°N 2.92693°W	—	Mid 17th century	A house later extended and divided into two, it is timber framed with rendered infill on a rendered stone plinth, and has a slate roof with ornamental cresting. There is one storey and an attic, and four bays. On the front is a doorway with a hood, three canted bay windows, a gable, and three gabled dormers. All the gables on the front have decorative bargeboards and finials.	II
1 and 2 Llanbrook; 52.40422°N 2.95776°W	—	Mid to late 17th century	A farmhouse, later divided into two cottages, with two bays each, two storeys, and slate roofs. The right cottage is timber framed with rendered infill, a timber gabled porch, and casement windows. The left cottage is in limestone, with one sash window, the others being top-hung casements.	II
Little Brampton Farmhouse; 52.42618°N 2.93052°W	—	Mid to late 17th century	The farmhouse was remodelled and extended in the 19th century. The original part is timber framed with brick infill on a rendered plinth. It has one storey and an attic, and two bays. The later parts are in roughcast stone, and have two storeys, the main part with a front of five bays. The roofs are slated, and the windows are sashes.	II
Barn southeast of Red Hall Cottage; 52.40951°N 2.97498°W	—	Mid to late 17th century	The barn is timber framed and weatherboarded with a limestone right gable end. It contains a doorway, an eaves hatch, and another hatched opening.	II
The Dutch Cottage; 52.42036°N 2.92696°W		Mid to late 17th century (probable)	The cottage has roughcast timber framing at the rear, brick at the front, a stone right gable end, the left gable end is rendered, and the roof is thatched. There is one storey and an attic. Canted bay windows flank the doorway, there is a small fixed window to the right, and above are three flat-roofed dormers.	II
Barn and vehicle entrance 52.42608°N 2.97786°W	—	Late 17th century	The barn is timber framed and weatherboarded on a limestone plinth, it has a corrugated iron roof, and contains doorways on three sides. To the west is a vehicle entrance.	II
Barn north of Cwm Farmhouse; 52.41187°N 2.97831°W	—	Late 17th century	The barn was later extended. It is timber framed and weatherboarded on a stone plinth, and has a corrugated iron roof. There are two levels, the original part has three bays, and the extension added two bays. The barn contains four doorways, a window, and three eaves hatches.	II
Kempton Farmhouse; 52.43904°N 2.94373°W	—	Late 17th century	The farmhouse, which was extended later, is in limestone with slate roofs. The original part forms a long range with two storeys, and contains casement windows. There is a 19th-century T-shaped extension with two storeys and an attic to the east, a two-storey lean-to in the angle, and a lower 19th-century extension to the west, all these containing mullioned and transomed windows. The doorway has a rectangular fanlight and a bracketed hood.	II
Kempton Stores; 52.44230°N 2.94216°W		Late 17th century	A cottage, later a shop, it is timber framed with rendered infill on a rendered plinth. The left gable end is in limestone and brick, the right gable end is in brick, and the roof is slated. There are two storeys, the doorway has a moulded surround, and the windows are casements.	II
Barn southeast of Llan Farmhouse; 52.40760°N 2.95416°W	—	Late 17th century	The barn is timber framed and weatherboarded on a limestone plinth, and has a slate roof. It has an L-shaped plan, with a four-bay two-storey range, and a later single-storey three-bay range at right angles. The barn contains doorways, a threshing entrance, and eaves hatches.	II
Barn northwest of Llanhowell Farmhouse; 52.40610°N 2.96522°W	—	Late 17th century	The barn is timber framed and weatherboarded on a stone plinth, and has a tile roof. There are two levels, and it contains eight doorways, one approached by steps, eaves hatches, and a raking eaves dormer.	II
Barn west of Lower House Farmhouse; 52.42670°N 2.97253°W	—	Late 17th century	The barn is timber framed and weatherboarded, it is clad in corrugated iron, and has a corrugated iron roof. The barn contains two doorways.	II
Barn northwest of Old Farmhouse; 52.42588°N 2.98145°W	—	Late 17th century	The barn is timber framed and weatherboarded on a stone plinth, and has a corrugated iron roof. It contains doorways and an eaves hatch.	II
South View; 52.44273°N 2.94672°W	—	Late 17th century	A timber framed cottage with brick infill, roughcast on the front and gable ends, and with a machine tile roof. There is one storey and an attic, three bays, and a lean-to at the rear on the right. The cottage has a gabled porch, casement windows, and three gabled eaves dormers.	II
Barn northeast of Fold Farmhouse; 52.42703°N 2.97935°W	—	Late 17th or early 18th century	The barn has two storeys. It is in limestone, and is timber framed and weatherboarded in the upper storey along the long sides. The barn contains a threshing entrance and narrow rectangular vents.	II
2 The Green; 52.42456°N 2.97931°W	—	Early 18th century	A limestone house, rendered at the front, with a Welsh slate roof. There are two storeys, two bays, a rear outshut, an open porch, and casement windows.	II
17 Clunton; 52.42601°N 2.97839°W	—	1737	A limestone farmhouse with a slate roof, two storeys and an attic. It has four bays and a lower range to the left. On the front is a doorway with a flat hood, casement windows, those in the upper floor with wedge lintels, and a datestone. Inside, there are stone inglenook fireplaces.	II
Bridge at N.G.R. SO 3607 8428; 52.45272°N 2.94220°W		Late 18th century (probable)	The bridge carries the drive to Walcot Hall over the River Kemp. It is in limestone and consists of two round-headed arches with a cutwater, a string course, a coped parapet, and square corner piers with ball finials.	II
Church House; 52.42009°N 2.92692°W	—	Late 18th century	A limestone house that was extended in the 19th century, it has red brick window heads, and a slate roof. There are two storeys, three bays, and a lower extension on the left. On the front is a gabled timber porch, and the windows are casements with segmental heads.	II
New House Farmhouse; 52.43213°N 2.95171°W	—	Late 18th century (probable)	The farmhouse was extended in the 19th century. It is in limestone with a slate roof, and has three storeys. Originally it had three bays, and a bay was later added to the left. The windows are casements, and the doorway has a gabled trellised porch.	II
Stone signpost 52.42674°N 2.92990°W		1800	The signpost, which has been moved from its original position, is in limestone and consists of a circular post with three raised bands, a square base and a domed cap. There are four pierced cast iron direction signs pointing towards Ludlow, Bishop's Castle, Clun, and Gunford.	II
4 Llanbrook; 52.40193°N 2.95758°W	—	Late 18th or early 19th century	A limestone cottage with a slate roof, one storey and an attic, and two bays. In the centre is a gabled timber porch, with a casement window to the right, and a gabled eaves dormer above.	II
Clunbury Hall; 52.42077°N 2.92582°W	—	Late 18th or early 19th century	A limestone farmhouse with a slate roof, two storeys and an attic, it has a T-shaped plan with lower ranges at the rear, and a front of three bays. There is a central porch and a doorway with a semicircular fanlight in a rectangular overlight. The windows are sashes, and there are three gabled eaves dormers.	II
Barns north of Coston Manor; 52.41555°N 2.89781°W	—	Late 18th or early 19th century (probable)	There are three barns forming a U-shaped plan, in limestone with slate roofs, and two levels. The barns contain double doors, segmental-headed windows and doorways, triangular vents, and pigeon holes and ledges.	II
Park Cottage; 52.44444°N 2.94648°W	—	Late 18th or early 19th century	An estate cottage in roughcast limestone with a hipped slate roof. There are two storeys and three bays. The cottage has an open gabled porch, and the windows are casements with Gothic-style triangular-headed heads.	II
Bridge near Park Cottage; 52.44438°N 2.94557°W		Late 18th or early 19th century	The bridge carries a road over the River Kemp. It is in limestone, and consists of three arches, the middle the largest, with two cutwaters on each side. The bridge has voussoirs, projecting keystones, a string course ramped over the central arch, and a coped parapet ending in round corner piers.	II
3 Walcot Avenue, wall, gate and gate pier 52.45309°N 2.93615°W		Early 19th century	At the entrance to the drive to Walcot Hall is a lodge in limestone with a pyramidal slate roof. It has a square plan, two storeys, and two bays. There is a pilastered pedimented timber porch, and the windows are casements. Attached to the lodge is a limestone wall leading to a gate pier that is surmounted by a ball finial, and the gate is in wrought iron.	II
4 Walcot Avenue, wall, gate and gate pier 52.45332°N 2.93619°W		Early 19th century	At the entrance to the drive to Walcot Hall is a lodge in limestone with a pyramidal slate roof. It has a square plan, two storeys, and two bays. There is a pilastered pedimented timber porch, and the windows are casements. Attached to the lodge is a limestone wall leading to a gate pier that is surmounted by a ball finial, and the gate is in wrought iron.	II
Clunton Mill; 52.42461°N 2.98070°W		Early 19th century (probable)	A former watermill, it is in limestone and red brick with a slate roof. There are three levels, a main block and an outshut housing the wheel. It contains a stable door, casement windows with segmental heads, and a segmental-headed arch to the mill race. The mill ceased working in 1938.	II
Former malthouse 52.42573°N 2.98103°W	—	Early 19th century	The malthouse, later used for other purposes, is in limestone with a corrugated iron roof. There are two storeys, five bays, three windows in the upper floor, and external steps leading up to the doorway.	II
Clunbury Bridge; 52.42100°N 2.92662°W		1837	The bridge, which was designed by Edward Haycock, carries a road over the River Clun. It is in limestone and consists of a single segmental arch with voussoirs, projecting keystones, a string course, and rectangular corner piers.	II
Little Brampton Bridge; 52.42476°N 2.92652°W		1843	The bridge, which was designed by Edward Haycock, carries a road over the River Kemp. It is in stone, and consists of a single segmental arch with a span of 6 metres (20 ft). The bridge has a string course, and a coped parapet, and ends in piers with pyramidal caps.	II
Milestone at N.G.R. SO 3600 8096; 52.42287°N 2.94250°W	—	Mid 19th century	The milestone is on the north side of the B4368 road, and consists of a round-headed stone. It is inscribed with the distances in miles to Clun and to Craven Arms.	II
Milestone at N.G.R. SO 3435 8132; 52.42594°N 2.96684°W	—	Mid 19th century	The milestone is on the north side of the B4368 road. It is in limestone, and consists of a round-headed stone inscribed with the distances in miles to Clun and to Craven Arms.	II
Milestone at N.G.R. SO 3629 8370; 52.44753°N 2.93875°W	—	Mid 19th century	The milestone is on the east side of the B4385 road. It is in limestone, and consists of a round-headed stone inscribed with the distances in miles to Bishop's Castle and to Craven Arms.	II
The Smithy; 52.44058°N 2.94209°W	—	Mid to late 19th century	The former smithy is in limestone, replaced by concrete in the left gable end, and it has a slate roof. It has one storey, and contains a casement window. The entrance is in the left gable end.	II
St Mary's Church, Clunton; 52.42602°N 2.97896°W	—	1870–71	The church, designed by Thomas Nicholson, is in limestone, and has a machine tile roof with ornamental cresting and a cross finial. It is a small church, consisting of a nave and chancel in one cell, and a north porch. On the west gable is a bellcote, and the windows are lancets with ogee-cusped heads.	II
War memorial 52.42273°N 2.94237°W		1922	The war memorial stands at a crossroads in Purslow. It is in stone and consists of a square obelisk with a small base, on a pedestal, on a two-stepped plinth. There are inscriptions and the names of those lost in the two World Wars and a subsequent conflict on the front of the obelisk, and on the front and sides of the pedestal. The war memorial is in an enclosure surrounded by wrought iron railings.	II
