= Bicton Castle =

Motte and bailey in Shropshire, England

- Bicton, Shropshire

Site information
- Type: Motte and bailey
- Condition: Earthworks

Location
- Coordinates: 52.4365°N 3.0470°W

Site history
- Built: 11th or 12th century

Bicton Castle was a motte and bailey dating from the 11th or 12th century in the hamlet of Bicton, southwest Shropshire, England. Only the ditch and outer bank remain as the other parts were dug away during gravel extraction. The short River Unk runs past it.

Bicton Castle is situated 1.9 kilometer upstream of the larger Clun Castle, in Clun. It is thought to have been held by a minor knight who held the local land in return for duties to the de Say family at Clun Castle. Its prime function was probably as a manorial centre for the flat area of surrounding farmland. It is also speculated to have been used in regulating river activities.

The site is on the National Heritage List for England as a scheduled monument, first listed in 1971, and officially scheduled by the Ancient Monuments and Archaeological Areas Act 1979.

== Construction ==
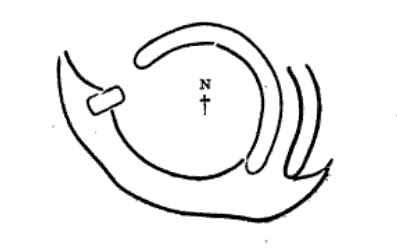
Outline of Bicton Castle

Bicton Castle was built by changing a low glacial mount. Although now oval in shape, the motte was likely to have been circular at first, with a diameter of 30 metres. At some point after it was abandoned, the ground was quarried for gravel. Its present-day height is 2.2 metres. A small bailey, 14 by 25 metres, was made by changing the shape of the southern part of the glacial mount.

== Bibliography ==
- Allcroft, A.H. (1908). Earthwork of England. London.
- Fry, P.S. (1980). Castles of the British Isles. David and Charles.
- King, C.D.J. (1983). Castellarium anglicanum: an index and bibliography of the castles in England, Wales and the Islands. Kraus International Publications.
- Pettifer, A. (1995). English castles - a guide by counties. Woodbridge: Boydell Press.
- Salter, M. (2001). The Castles and Moated Mansions of Shropshire. Malvern: Folly Publications.
