= Bicton, Shropshire =

Bicton, Shropshire may refer to:

- Bicton, Shrewsbury
- Bicton, South Shropshire
