= Leonard Arthur Bethell =

British soldier and writer (1879–1950)

Leonard Arthur Bethell OBE
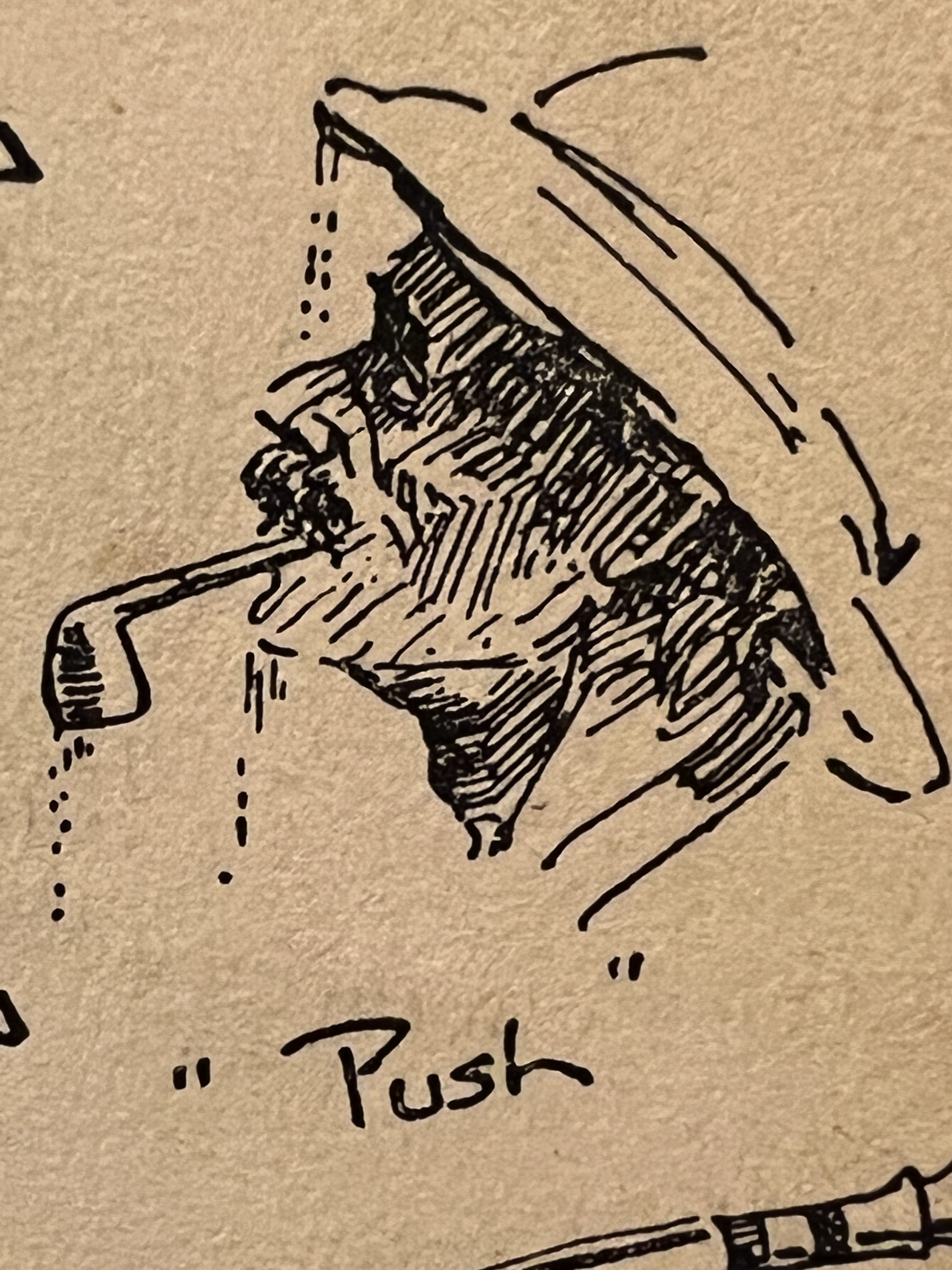
- Bethell ("Push") in the rain in Assam jungles, 1910
- Born: 6 December 1879; Boulogne-sur-Mer, France
- Died: 15 December 1950 (aged 71); Craven Arms, Shropshire, England
- Education: Royal Military College, Sandhurst
- Occupations: British Army officer, author, Authors' editor
- Spouse: Winifred Clytie Hall (m. 1908; died 1940)
- Children: Leonard; Eileen
- Parents: Henry S. Bethell (father); Sarah H Macleane (mother)
- Awards: Order of the British Empire

Lieutenant Colonel Leonard Arthur Bethell OBE (6 December 1879 – 15 December 1950) was a distinguished soldier in India in Edwardian times, and a successful author in the 1930s. He is chiefly significant as an author, providing a direct, unheroic and unvarnished narrative of British efforts to administer the Northern jungles of Assam during the early 20th century, often providing an alternative view to the official accounts.

== Personal life ==
Through his father, Leonard was connected to Cardinal Manning, and to Richard Bethell, first Baron Westbury, former Lord Chancellor of England. On his mother's side, he was connected to the ancient Highland Clan of Maclean.

Leonard was born in Boulogne in 1879, but the family address was 16 Royal Crescent, Walcot, Bath, Somerset. The family were in transit when the birth happened.

The Bethell household 1881 census indicates a large and prosperous family. Bethell's father, Henry Slingsby Bethell, is described as a civil engineer. The family had eight live-in servants and 6 children – one daughter and five sons at the time of the census, Leonard being the youngest, at one year old.

When Henry lost a lung due to TB in 1889, the family took Villa Bader in Garmisch, a ski resort in a mountainous area of Bavaria, mountain air being believed beneficial for TB. They took in paying guests there – Edward Elgar's family was among them, and he dedicated his work 'From the Bavarian Highlands' to them. Elgar played football with the youngsters of the house, and he and Henry remained friends throughout life.

Leonard was educated in Garmisch, then in England. His father, though Eton-educated, sent Leonard to the Catholic boys school – Ampleforth College in North Yorkshire. Henry had converted to Catholicism in 1861 – he died in Rome in 1908 when Leonard was 28. After Ampleforth, Leonard went to Royal Military College, Sandhurst and then joined the army.

Leonard married Winifred Clytie Hall in Shillong, Assam, in 1908. They made a trip back to England immediately afterwards – Clytie's father had died a day before the wedding. The marriage was not always a happy one, but they remained married until Clytie's death in 1940. The couple had two children – Eileen Nancy Bethell (1909–1988) and Leonard Norman Bethell (1914–1940) — Eileen went on to marry John Birney in 1937 and have children, Norman died at Dunkirk in 1940.

Leonard became a good linguist in his time – he was able to speak German, French and Italian – and Hindi, Urdu and Gurkhali, these last being a requirement of his army service. He loved trekking in the Austrian Alps – where he also bought some land in the mountains.

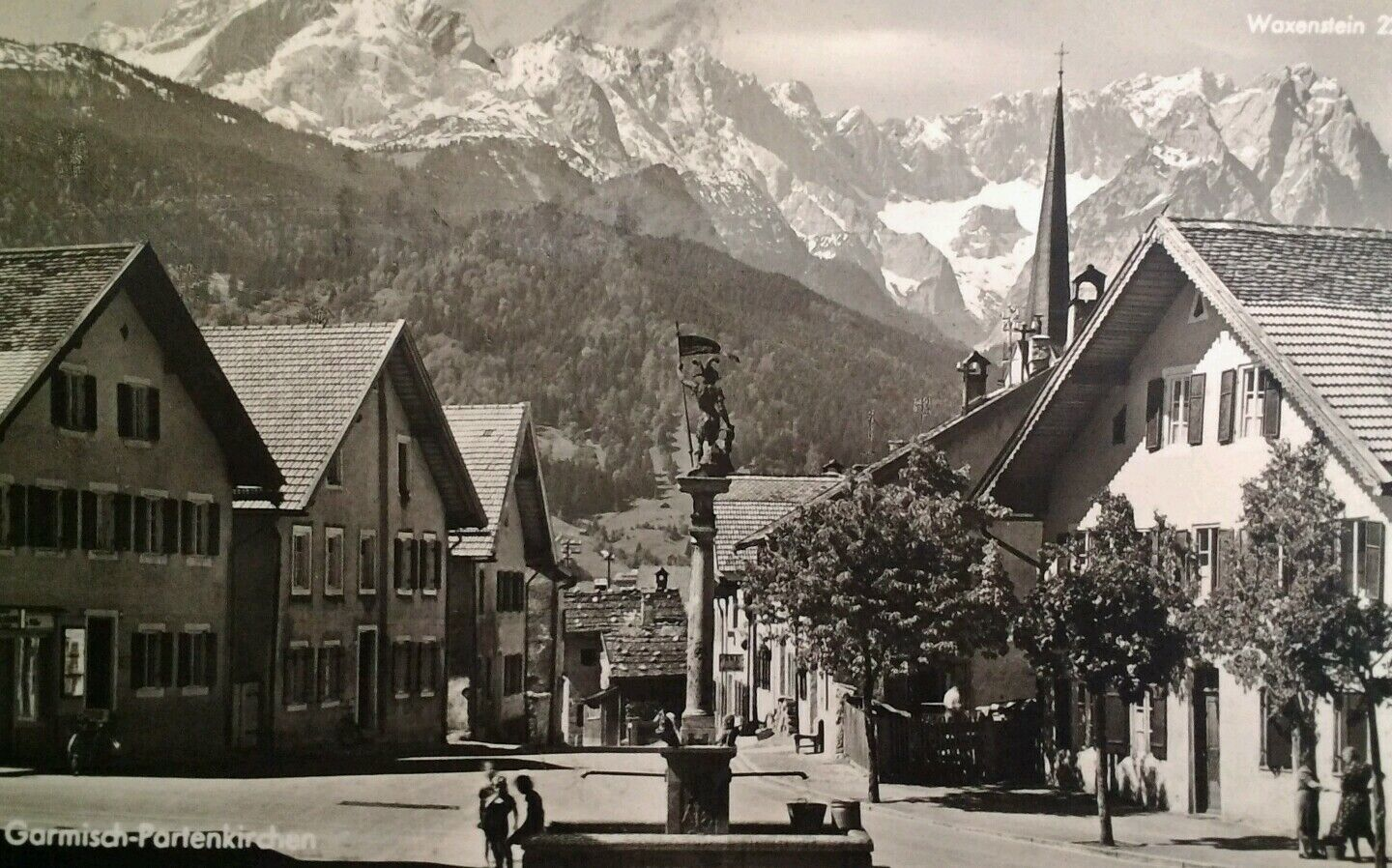
Villa Bader Garmisch c 1950

Bethell joined the Fairclough Lodge of Freemasons in Mandalay, Burma in 1917.

== Military career ==
=== South Africa ===
The Second Boer War, 1899–1902, was fought to prevent parts of South Africa – Orange Free State and Transvaal – seceding from British control. The war was generally unsuccessful for the British, who engaged half a million troops versus the Boers 50,000 to win it. The demand for new recruits was high.

Bethell joined the York and Lancaster Regiment as a young second Lieutenant on his 20th birthday, and went immediately to South Africa. He saw action at the relief of Ladysmith, and took part in the battles of Spion Kop, Vaal Krantz, Tugela Heights, Pieter's Hill and the second Battle of Laing's Nek on 12 June 1900. He was in operations in the Transvaal, July 1900 to April 1901, and on the Zululand frontier of Natal from April to July 1900. While in South Africa he served for a time with the Mounted Infantry.

=== India ===
Bethell was seconded for service with the Indian Staff Corps from 23 October 1901 and arrived in India in November 1901. He was appointed to the Indian Army in October 1902, serving with the 16th Rajput Infantry. In November 1902 he was attached temporarily to the 13th Rajput Infantry. In 1904 he was posted to the 8th Gurkha Rifles and in 1908 to the new 10th Gurkha Rifles on its formation. In 1912 he was appointed Assistant Commandant of the Lakhimpur Battalion, Assam Military Police.

=== Tibet ===
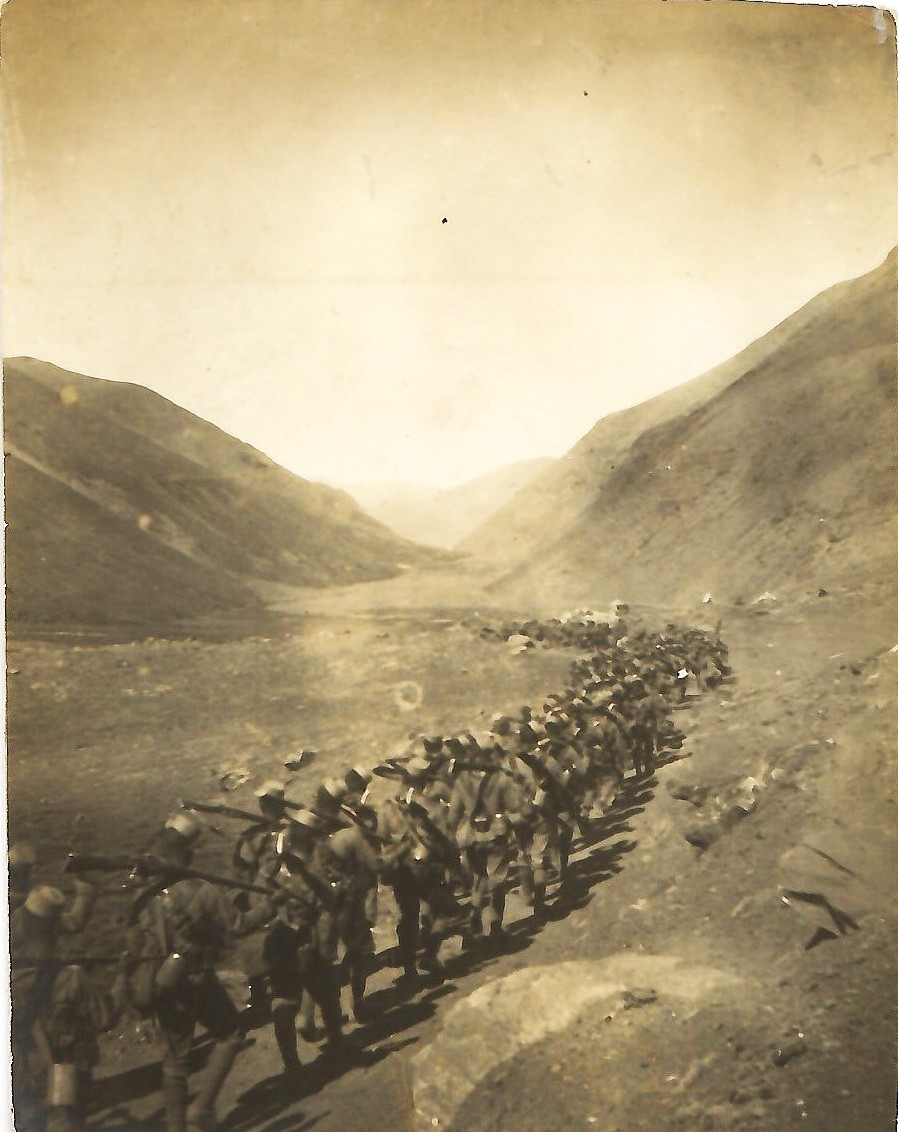
Army advancing, Younghusband expedition Tibet 1904

The Younghusband Expedition to Tibet, 1903 – 1904, was a late imperial adventure, ordered by the Viceroy, Lord Curzon, to create a foothold on India's Northern border against the feared Russian and Chinese influences. Bethell was part of the Younghusband Expedition when he was seconded to the 4th Gurkha Rifles. During this time, he met Frederick Marshman Bailey, who became a close friend. He was in action at Niani and Gyantse Jong, and in the march to Lhasa. (Indian Army Lists.) Bethell was a keen photographer and took about 200 on the expedition, now held by the Birney family.

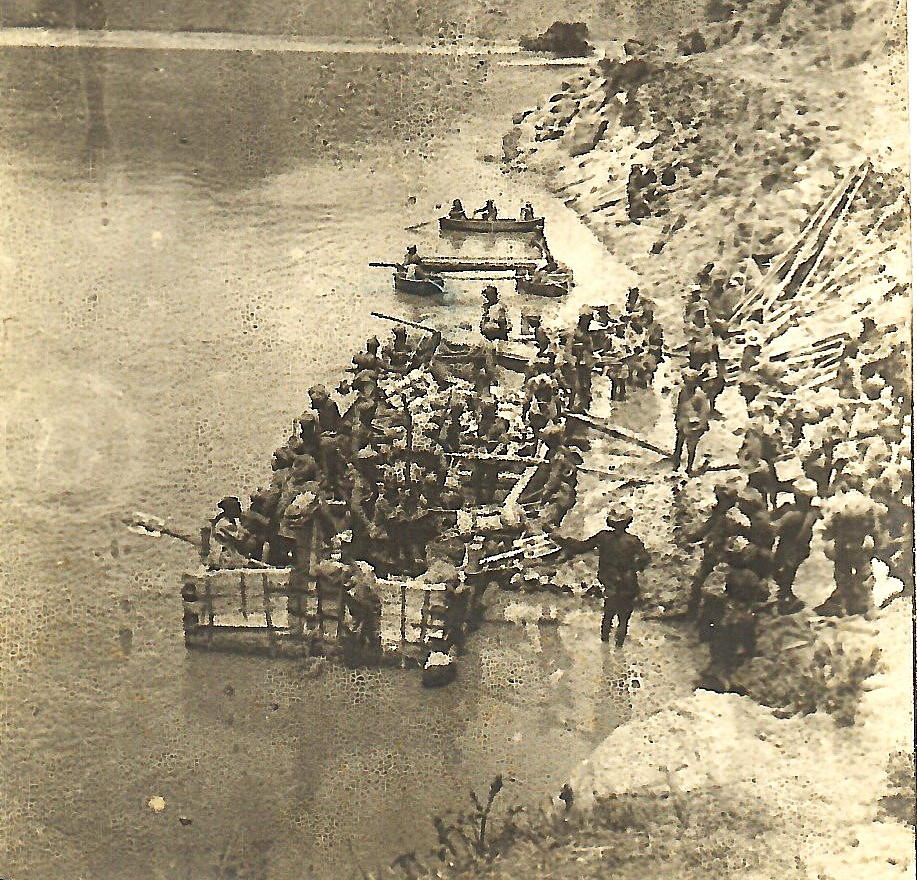
Raft building to cross Tsangpo River, Younghusband Expedition

Though militarily successful the treaties it led to were later revoked, and it fell into disfavour with government and the British public, who saw it as a massacre of unarmed peasants. Bethell gives a different view, based on his own experience, in 'A Footnote' (see below).

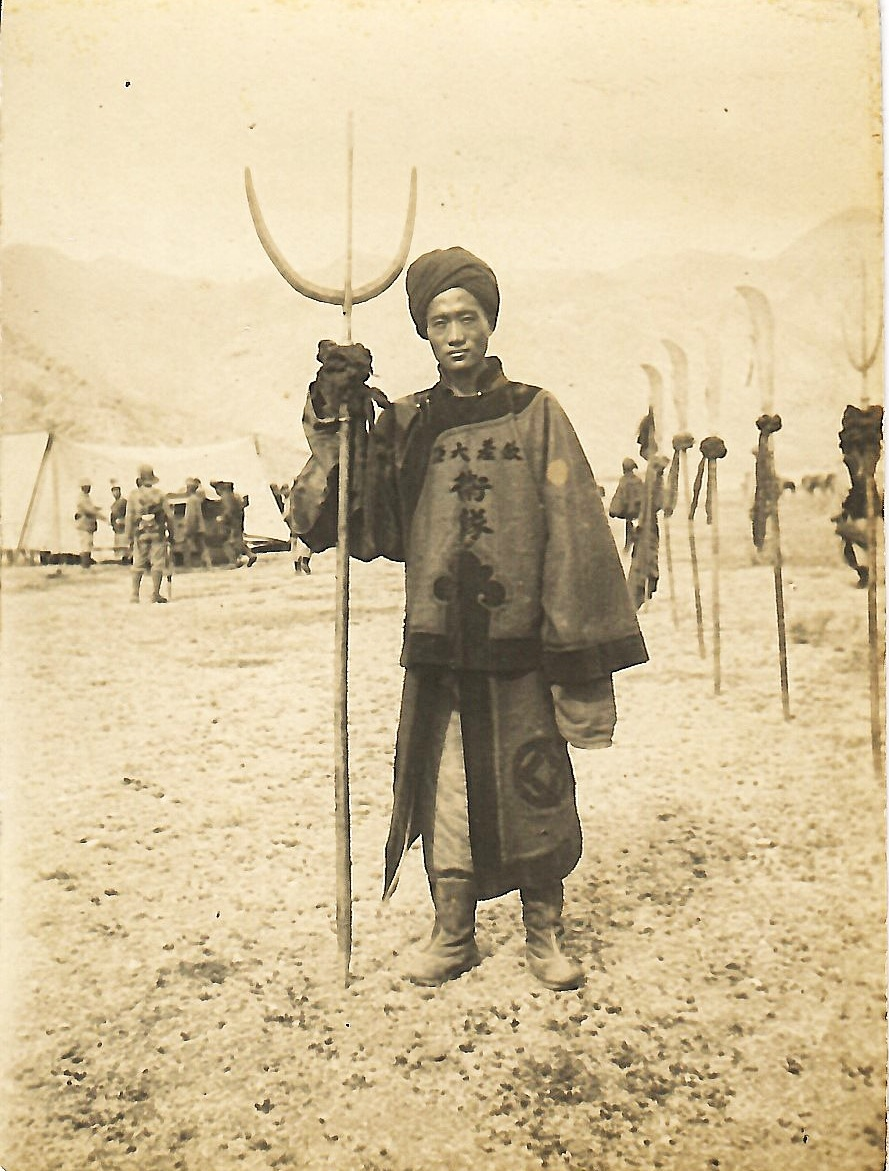
Chinese soldier – bodyguard of the Chinese Amban. Younghusband Expedition

=== Assam ===
Bethell took part in the Abor expedition into the jungles of Assam, 1911–12, to avenge the murder by the Abors of the explorers Dr. Gregorson and Assistant Political Officer Mr. N. Williamson, and most of their fifty servants and porters. Bethell based his story 'High Brows and Low Brows' (see below) on this expedition, and was joint contributor to an article on its geographical results. F. M. Bailey was also a member of this expedition.

=== First World War ===
Bethell was posted to France in 1914. He joined the 2nd Gurkha Rifles on 12 November 1914, and was in action soon afterwards. On 11 December he went forward of the trenches and brought in two wounded men and, with help, two dead. On 20 December he was engaged in the action at La Quinque Rue. He was severely wounded, and left France on 28 February 1915. He was mentioned in despatches in the London Gazette 22 June 1915.

=== Burma and Pakistan ===
Recovering from his wound he returned to Burma, rejoined the Gurkhas, and took command of the 1st/10th Gurkha Rifles Depot at Mandalay until January 1916, after which he was appointed Company Officer at the Cadet College in Quetta, Baluchistan. He returned to the 1st/10th Depot soon afterwards, and commanded it at Mandalay Fort and Maymyo. The History of the 10th Gurkha Rifles says of him: "Bethell was a strange and in some ways eccentric character and many stories were told about him and his unorthodox disciplinary methods, but there was never any criticism of his work as Depot Commander throughout the war, and the 1st Battalion owe him a deep debt of gratitude for the five drafts sent them... he also showed unusual breadth of vision in the great care he took to safe-guard the health and happiness of the families of the men on service.".

=== Afghanistan, 1919 ===
Bethell took part in the Third Afghan War with the 7th Gurkha Rifles. He was appointed OBE, and was mentioned in despatches in the London Gazette 3 August 1920.

=== The Khyber Pass ===
He was given command of the 2nd Battalion 4th Gurkha Rifles and during his tour of command his battalion served at Landi Kotal and Landi Khana in the Khyber Pass area. During this period, he met Frederick Marshman Bailey again, who was returning through the Khyber Pass from his undercover activities in Central Asia.

=== Retirement from the Army ===
His tour of command was shortened due to a heart condition: he was invalided to England in August 1924. He came on his own and his postal address then was given as 'c/o Lloyds Bank, Pall Mall'. On 14 September 1926 he was placed on the Unemployed List on completion of his command.

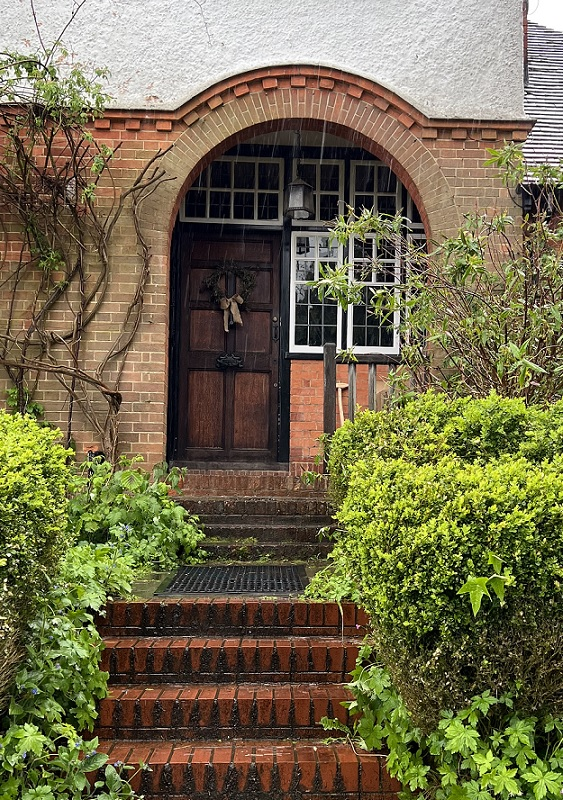
Front door of New Clan, Harrow Road West, Dorking

His army pension left him short of funds, but his mother-in-law cleared his debts, and bought New Clan in Dorking for the family. By 1926 both he and his wife are on the electoral register for New Clan.

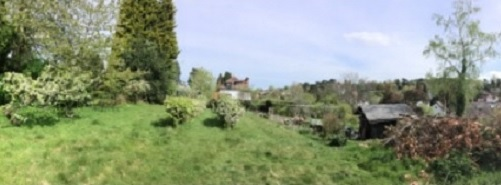
New Clan land: the old orchard, 2015. House is in the far distance

A detailed list of his service record is held by the Gurkha Museum, Winchester, in the biography by Denis Wood, February 2023.

=== Medals ===
Bethell received the following military awards and decorations.

- Queen's South Africa Medal with clasps – Cape Colony, Tugela Heights, Orange Free State, Relief of Ladysmith, Transvaal, Laing's Nek, South Africa 1901.
- Tibet Medal with clasp Gyantse.
- India General Service Medal 1909 with clasps Abor 1911–12 and Afghanistan N.W.F. 1919 and oak leaves.
- 1914 Star.
- British War Medal 1914–20.
- Victory Medal with oak leaves.

== Literary career ==
Bethell left the army in 1927 owing to ill health, and began a successful writing career – under his own name, but also under pseudonyms 'Pousse Cailloux' and 'Forepoint Severn' – generally covering his own experiences with the Gurkhas.

('Pousse Cailloux – a French expression for 'foot soldier', 'Forepoint Severn' – probably a reference to the 4.7-inch gun used in South Africa and in World War I – known for its reliability)

When contributing to magazines other than Blackwoods he uses even more pseudonyms – "Mauser", "Punjabi", and "Peter Paul" – in the Sphere, and the Graphic.

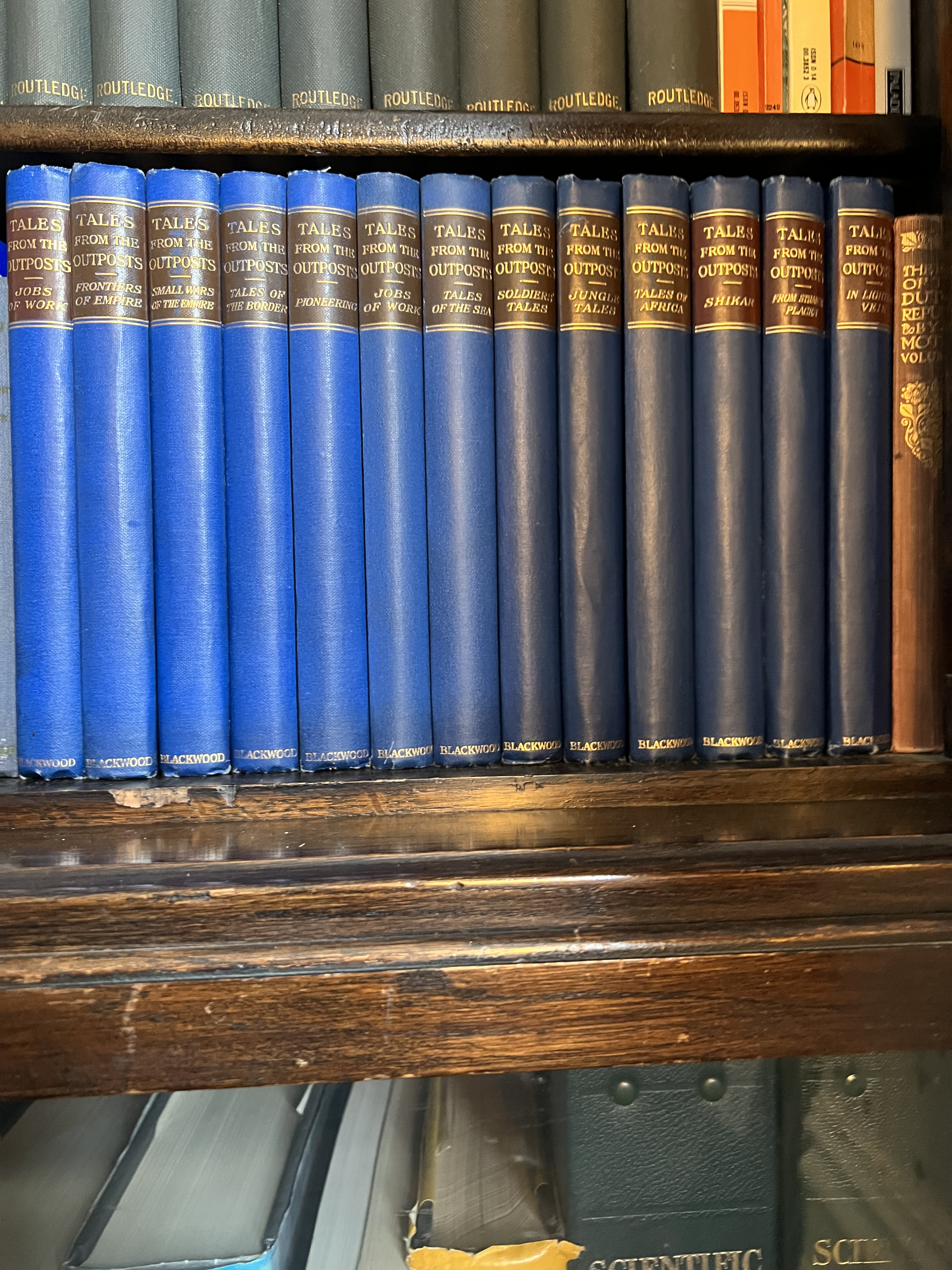
Tales from the Outposts, 12 vols

He wrote primarily for Blackwood's Magazine, and, becoming a mainstay of their commercial success at the time, was offered a post as Director. In that role, he created the 12 volume series 'Tales from the Outposts' which became another commercial success. As part of the deal, he was offered 25% of the proceeds – he stuck out for, and got, 50%. (Letter from Bethell to Bailey)

The stories in the collection are from remote corners of the world, especially the British Empire, and told by people living in or with experience of those places. Most were originally published in Blackwood's, which found a large part of its circulation in those colonial locations.

The project took three years, from 1930 to 1933, and included contributions from notable authors and personalities – Sir Hugh Clifford, Joseph Conrad, John Buchan, Fredrick Marshman Bailey, Alfred Noyes, George Younghusband, Lord Baden-Powell, Weston Martyr, Humfrey Jordan, Frank Coutts Hendry, Ernest Swinton, Edmund Candler, Alfred Ollivant, R. E. Vernede, Geo. Forbes F.R.S., John Still, Perceval Gibbon, Hilton Brown, John Graham Bower and many others. Index to 'Tales from the Outposts'.

The books fell out of favour during the mid-twentieth century as interest in the empire declined. However some of the volumes have now been re-issued in paperback.

=== Published works ===
Bethell also published works of his own, including some of the stories in 'Tales from the Outposts'.

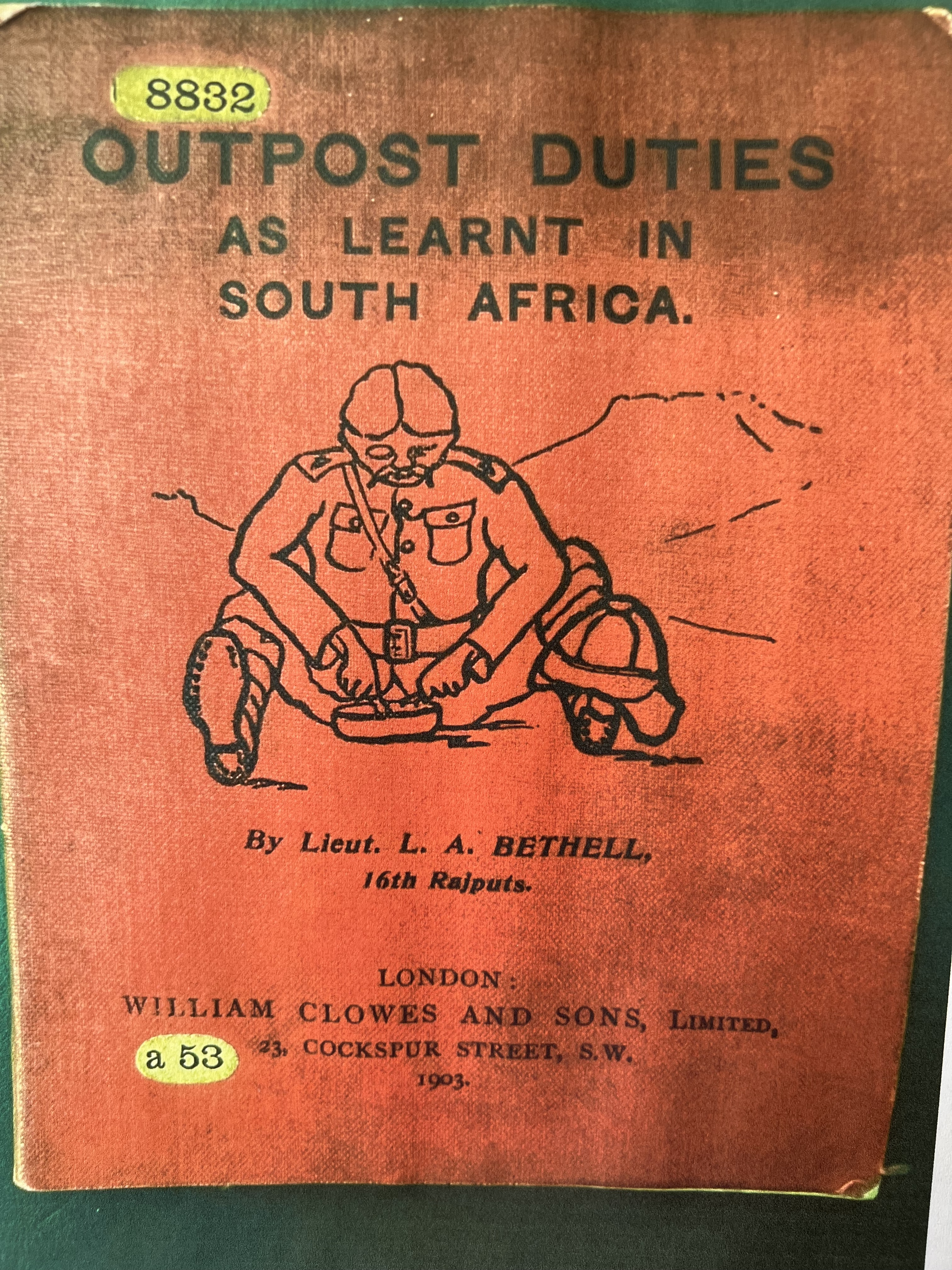
Outpost Duties Learnt in South Africa, L. A. Bethell

Outpost duties as learnt in South Africa, William Clowes & Sons, London 1903. (43 pp)

Bethell's first published work, published under his own name. The short book, or pamphlet, written as an army manual, is based on his experiences in South Africa during the Boer War. The Boer soldiers, better adapted to the landscape and country, presented a real challenge to sentries. The book's general attitude might be summarised as 'shoot first, ask questions later; bayonet if possible to avoid noise!'.

Blackwood's Tales from the Outposts; general editor, under his own name. 12 volume, Edinburgh and London, 1932–1933 (with reprints from articles in Blackwoods Magazine).

Bethell's stories within this series – all written under the pseudonym 'Pousse Cailloux' – are –

Volume 1 : Frontiers of Empire:
"A Footnote" – Bethell's personal account of the Younghusband expedition. Bethell's regiment was responsible for keeping open the passes, and supply lines from India. When these were eventually over-stretched, the expedition risked an unsupported journey to Lhasa, raiding monasteries for food.
'A Footnote' is repeatedly cited in Charles Allen's 'Duel in the Snows'.

'A Footnote' gained gratitude from Younghusband's wife, Lady Helen Augusta Younghusband, who wrote "I shall never forget my delight in this blessed Blackwood, sent to me anonymously in 1935. We never saw the author, but I wrote to him through the publishers to tell him what this charming appreciation has meant to me. H. A. Y."

"A Border Affair" describes an expedition across the Assam jungles to investigate reports of Chinese activity on the Northern border. They find an isolated garrison, and a notice in Chinese – this is the limit of the Celestial Empire. The garrison is starving and demoralised – they are taken back to British headquarters, and given a passage by ship back to China.

"The Silver Hand of Alexander" – a remarkable, though speculative, account of factors in the Conolly and Stoddart affair, based on archives of The Great Game that Bethell had been given access to. The title refers to a silver replica of the hand of Alexander – almost the only successful conqueror of Afghanistan and other Islamist Khanates of the area, where his name still carries respect.

Volume 3 : Tales of the Border:
"Retaliation" – a story of revenge in the Pathan community, as narrated to Bethell.

Volume 8 : Jungle Tales:
"Lost Sepoys" – told against the background of the Lakhimpur Military Police restoring order in the jungle after the Abor Expedition withdrew. Two soldiers go hunting and fail to return at nightfall. As the search parties go to sleep on the last night of their search, they hear the extraordinary, almost human wailing of a chorus of jackals. A sound they have never heard before in that part of the jungle. The remains of the two Gurkhas are found some months later, only yards from where the searchers were looking for them.

"Highbrows and Lowbrows" – a fictionalised version of the Abor expedition which Bethell was part of. Names and details are altered, but it seems probable that Dr Gregorson ("Grant" in the story) – is from life. Bethell blames his ethnographical inquiries for the incomprehension and hostility arising between explorers and tribesmen, and the consequent volatile situation. The most singular incident – of the colours on the envelopes being the cause of the massacre, and hence the resulting punitive expedition – accords with the historical accounts of the time. The conclusion of the story – which is not historical – gives Bethell's imagined view of how the Abor expedition should have been run.

Bethell says in his opening paragraph that his story brings cause and effect into closer relationship than occurred in real life, and that he does not use real names – "so it is useless, after all these years, to try to identify the people who walk through these pages"

"Movable Columns" – Strategy in jungle warfare, in particular the work by the Assam Military Police – of which Bethell was Assistant Commandant – to normalise relations with the tribes following the withdrawal of the Abor expedition. Bethell himself was on the Abor expedition, whose methods he criticises – thus his preference for writing under a pseudonym.

Volume 11 : From Strange Places:
"Eldorado Unlimited" – An economic history of India from the first opening of the sea route to Mumbai onwards. A mixture of official facts and figures blended with Bethell's own experiences and anecdotes of India.

Volume 12 : In Lighter Vein:
"Weights and Scales" – A fishing holiday in happy mood, somewhere in the Punjab, on a river where the foothills of the Himalayas are visible in the distance. Bethell catches a huge mahseer with much-needed help from two Indian boys – the sons of his shikari.

"A Rapid Survey" – An adventure down an unexplored jungle river in a Berthon Boat. The boat holds up well given its construction, but is broken as they cross their third rapids. Bethell mentions this story in his letters, and makes it clear that real events have been extended and amplified for the purpose of the story. He says that F. M. Bailey was one of the people with him – named 'Baird' in the story.

"Fiat Experimentum" – After a rabies cure at the Pasteur Institute, Bethell uses the rest of his leave to stay on and look over the various experiments and researches in progress at the institute.

"Experiments in the Primitive" – Among Blackwoods articles not published in 'Tales from the Outposts', this attracted critical interest. Zarif, in his book, 'Two Months Leave', says 'This was an excellent article, covering entirely new ground, in which the author showed, for the first time, probably, in the history of shikar, that there is a definite peculiar influence which man exerts over animals. There is some form of mental "telepathy" which, if a man sits waiting patiently, murder in his heart, to shoot an animal, seems to warn that animal, who probably never appears". F. W. Champion in 'The Jungle in Sunlight and Shadow' summarises – 'He (Bethell) had been watching some of these magnificent wild sheep at rather long range for hours on end waiting for a chance to shoot. At long last he decided to risk the shot, and, simultaneously with his decision, the three Ammon, which had paid no attention to him all day, jumped to their feet, fully alert, even though he had not made the slightest sound or movement'.

'Anyhow, whatever theories people may have about this, we do all of us owe a debt of gratitude to "Forepoint Severn" for his courage in being the first to bring to light what must, after all, have seemed at first sight to be a crazy theory.'

His Majesty's Shirt Sleeves, (as Pousse Cailloux). Blackwood, Edinburgh and London, 1930.

A collection of short stories, many of them later republished in 'Tales from the Outposts'.

The Garden of the Hesperides, (as Forepoint Severn). Blackwood, Edinburgh and London, 1936.

A collection of short stories, including

Adedoids, which refers to Frederick Marshman Bailey's under cover activities in what was to become Soviet Central Asia. Bailey was a master of disguise. He joined the Soviet Secret Police and was assigned to a mission to find an undercover British secret agent – who was himself! Luckily, the mission was not a success. In this story, Bailey is referred to under the pseudonym 'Barclay' as Bethell makes clear in his letter to Bailey, 8 November 1934

Adedoids also includes an eyewitness account of the Jallianwala Bagh massacre, as related to Bethell by an Indian friend of his who lived in a house overlooking the square. Bethell was at that time with the 4th Gurkhas in what is now Pakistan. Bethell concludes from their discussion that the primary incitement to a potential riot was by a renegade British officer – a deserter already known to Bethell from his time in Assam.

The Bat Artist, describes a hunting and trekking holiday in the previously Austrian South Tyrol, recently taken over by Italy in boundary changes following the First World War. The holiday is organised by Bethell, who has bought a small mountain estate there. The political situation in the area is tense, with the rise of Fascism in neighbouring Italy. One of the party turns up very late, having been detained by bureaucratic and political obstructions entering the area. Among other events, he has had a meeting with Adolf Hitler. As often happens in Bethell's stories, the identity of this member of the party, who is sympathetic to Hitler's views, is covered by a pseudonym – "Brodie" – the 'Bat artist'. (An older term for insanity – cf 'bats in the belfry'. or 'batty')

The Blind Road, (as Forepoint Severn). Blackwood, Edinburgh and London, 1938.

Describes a year-long expedition through unexplored and uncharted jungles of northern Assam to assess invasion routes from China, and possibly to discover what had happened to a lone British explorer travelling incognito, and gathering intelligence, in China and Sikkim. Bethell knows him from the Tibet Mission. He names him 'Drummond' – in fact a pseudonym for Frederick Marshman Bailey. As he states in his letter to Bailey "there are bound to be a number of people who will be able to identify 'Drummond' with F. M. Bailey".

("Drummond" is taken from Bailey's home street in Edinburgh.)

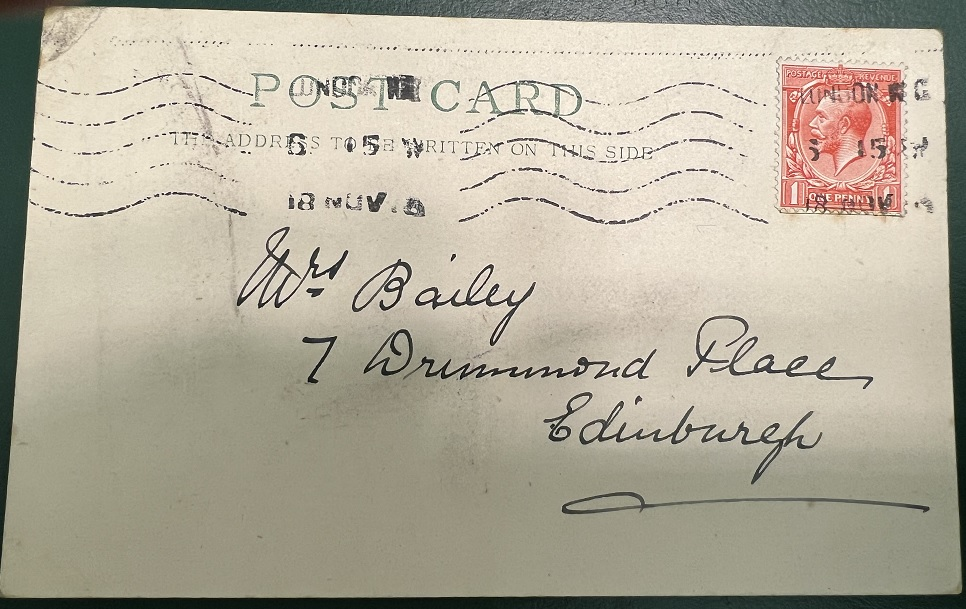
Post card to Mrs. Bailey, mother of Frederick Bailey

The party, led by Bethell, struggle against multiple obstacles – eaten alive by leeches, throwing rope bridges across river gorges, scrambling along sheer rocks by the side of a river as their only means of progress, and cutting a weary way through dense belts of bamboo forest. Reaching the northern limit of their journey, they assess that any invasion through that route would be as doomed as they have been but they rescue 'Drummond' whom they find destitute and half-starved in a cave.

The story is based on Bethell's diary of the year, and includes many evocative and atmospheric diversions into the life of the jungle, the tribes, the little understood tribal rituals of birth and death.

"At evening, the ancient would be nodding drowsily over the fire; by morning, his place empty; and nobody would ask where he had gone. They knew. For his last remaining strength would have carried him slowly and through days of travel to the silent tarn. And there, silent, wretched, he would creep out along the spit of land between the two arms of the black water, out to the tip of the land, and there build himself a last oblation to the unknown. One visualised the awful loneliness, with no man or woman to give him courage for the last ordeal, hold his hand, even bid him farewell, as he faced the ghouls pressing in on him. With, in all probability, his lifetime's first genuine prayer, he would lay himself down, his hands outstretched to the sacrifice that bridged his dying life to an unknown and dark eternity. And so, at length, pass over.
Bailey and I turned away, pursued by the creepiness of our own imaginings, and climbed gladly to the men once more. Till camp that evening, I never heard a voice raised or a word said. "

Travelling back, when crucial parts of the food ration are stolen by the jungle tribes, one of the guards on the food store is suspected of complicity. Summary execution is considered, but commuted until they get back to HQ – 'Hodiya' in the story, Sadiya in fact. Half-starved and in rags they do get back home – the death sentence is reprieved.

'The Blind Road' received favourable critical reviews – the Observer of 1939, for example, writing "Until this book of Forepoint Severn's the North East Frontier has lacked its Herodotus and Xenophon, its Stevenson and Verne. Now we have a man's tale which for vivid incident and descriptive power is likely to be long without a rival. On to his personal knowledge of the grim borderland north of Assam the author has grafted a thrilling and fascinating tale."

== Friendship with Frederick Marshman Bailey ==
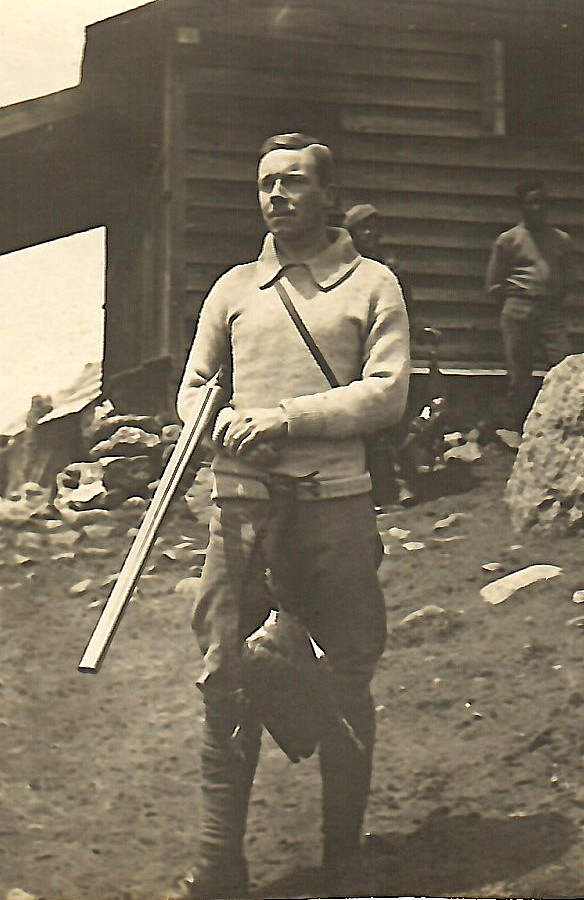
FM Bailey, Tibet 1904 – Younghusband Expedition

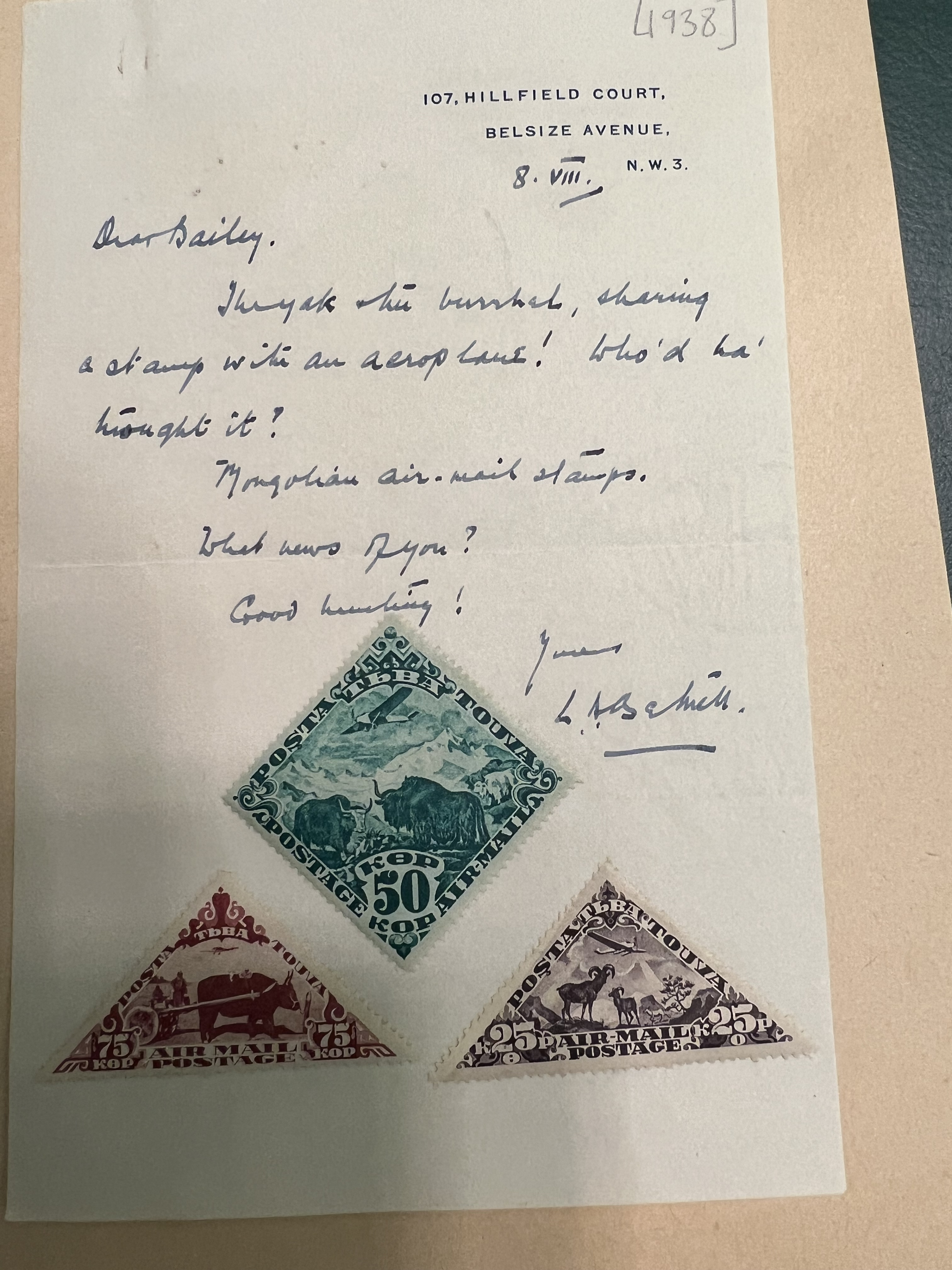
Sample letter from Leonard Arthur Bethell to Frederick M. Bailey

Bethell and Bailey were on the Younghusband Expedition together, shared a tent and shared the privations of that expedition. "In that first winter – indeed, throughout the expedition except during the two months of summer – personal cleanliness went by default. Had there been fuel enough to spare for hot water, the bath would have suffered the same fate as the teacup." (frozen instantly). "There was no shaving, and a most atrocious beard disguised everybody. A change of underwear became a risky adventure, rarely to be indulged in; and since going to bed involved only the addition of more clothing to that of the day, the matter was steadily overlooked"

Bailey was a secret agent in China and Central Asia during the same era as Bethell was working in Assam – effectively playing his part in 'The Great Game', countering Russian influence on India's northern border. A friendship developed between the two, and later included their families as well, sharing holidays and visits together. They remained friends for years, and a long correspondence from 1915 to 1938 is held in the National Archive. (The letters from Bethell were archived by Bailey, but not his own replies to them.)

Bethell used the adventures and travels of Bailey in several of his stories, most notably 'The Blind Road'. The correspondence between the two came to an end after publication of 'The Blind Road'. The last two letters from Bethell both ask for comments on 'The Blind Road', but he evidently did not receive any. There was a conflict of interest, as Bailey was planning his own memoirs at the time.

== Retirement and death ==
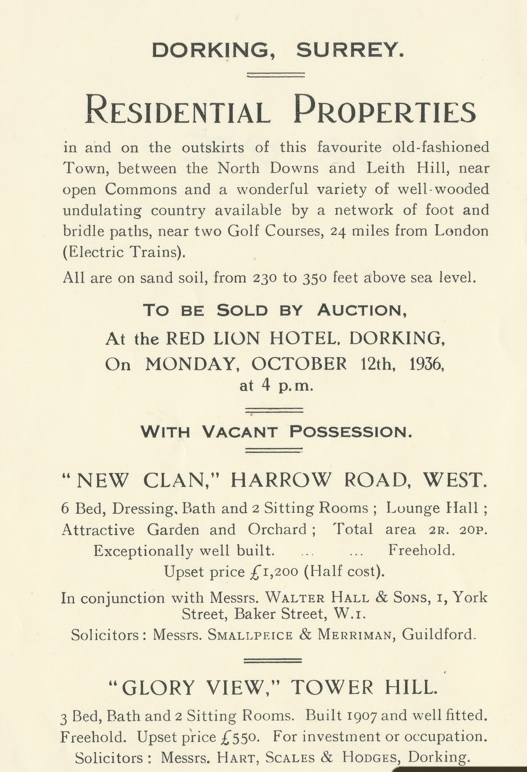
New Clan Sale particulars, 1936

In a letter 27 December 1935 Bethell announced that, with regret, he was selling their house in Dorking, New Clan House, and moving to a serviced flat in London, in Hillfield Court, Belsize Avenue. This, he said, was part of his retirement plan – relieving him of the many responsibilities of looking after a large house. It also simplified his travel to Blackwoods, where he was working full time – in fact, he used Paternoster Row as his correspondence address in some of the letters to Bailey.

He wrote of 'The Blind Road' at Hillfield – "Looking back on it now from the thickly carpeted dullness of an ultra-modern London flat, the policeman round the corner, and the din of motors and mechanised music everywhere, one discovers that there was a definite elation in that interminable period of starvation and uncertainty,"

At the outbreak of the Second World War, he would have been 60. He volunteered, and served as a translator, and a Home Guard officer in Liverpool.

On the night of Sunday December 29, 1940, Blackwoods head office in Paternoster Row was completely destroyed in World War II bombing raids. His wife died on the same day, and his son had died at Dunkirk earlier in the same year.

Bethell did not publish anything after 'The Blind Road' in 1938: if he was working on anything further it may have been lost in the bombing.

After the war he moved to Hodne Farm, Buckley, in the Ludlow district of Shropshire, and took to walking in the Welsh Hills. Later he moved to a cottage – The Warren, Clun Road, Clunton, Craven Arms – with Doris Ball, who had been his neighbour at Hodne Farm. (Doris's husband Frederick had left her, and gone to America in 1924).

Doris and Leonard remained together until Leonard died in December 1950. He left his estate to Doris and is buried at St Swithun's Church, Clunbury.

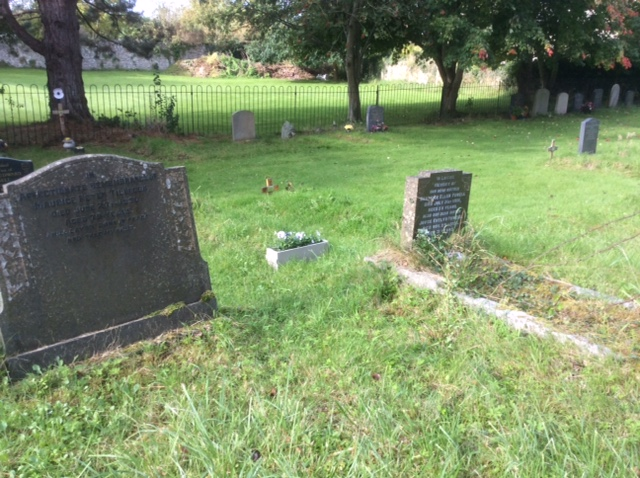
Leonard Bethell's resting place, between the two headstones, Clunbury church yard.

== Aliases of people and place names ==
Bethell often covers true stories with aliases and altered names some of which are listed below:
"Drummond" = Frederick Marshman Bailey
"Barclay" = Frederick Marshman Bailey
"Dr Grant" = Dr Gregorson (of the Abor expedition)
"Pardon-Howe" = Mr. W. C. M. Dundas, Political Officer at Sadiya
"Hodiya" = Sadiya .
"Push" = Leonard Bethell
