= Colebatch, Shropshire =

Village in Shropshire, England

Coordinates: 52.477°N 3.004°W

Colebatch
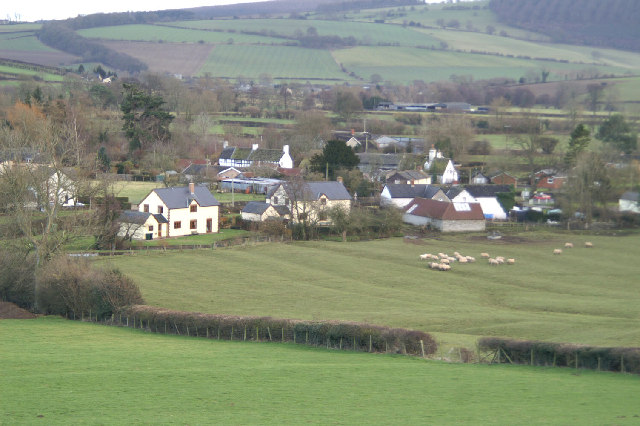
- Colebatch seen from the Shropshire Way

- Location within Shropshire
- Population: 210 (2011)
- OS grid reference: SO318870
- Civil parish: Colebatch
- Unitary authority: Shropshire
- Ceremonial county: Shropshire
- Region: West Midlands
- Country: England
- Sovereign state: United Kingdom
- Post town: BISHOPS CASTLE
- Postcode district: SY9
- Dialling code: 01588
- Police: West Mercia
- Fire: Shropshire
- Ambulance: West Midlands
- UK Parliament: Ludlow

Colebatch is a small village and civil parish in southwest Shropshire, England. The population of the Civil Parish as at the 2011 census was 210.

The village lies on the A488, one mile south of Bishop's Castle, on the road to Clun. Also nearby, to the east, is the village of Lydbury North, while the hamlet of Cefn Einion lies to the west.

In the village, on the west side of a tributary of the River Kemp, are the earthwork remains of Colebatch Castle, a small motte castle.

The village is named after the Colebatch family who owned the village and castle of Colebatch. Descendants include John Colebatch and Hal Colebatch. The name was originally the Norman word d'Colebatche.

== See also ==
- Listed buildings in Colebatch, Shropshire
