= Purslow =

Hamlet in Shropshire, England

Coordinates: 52.422°N 2.942°W

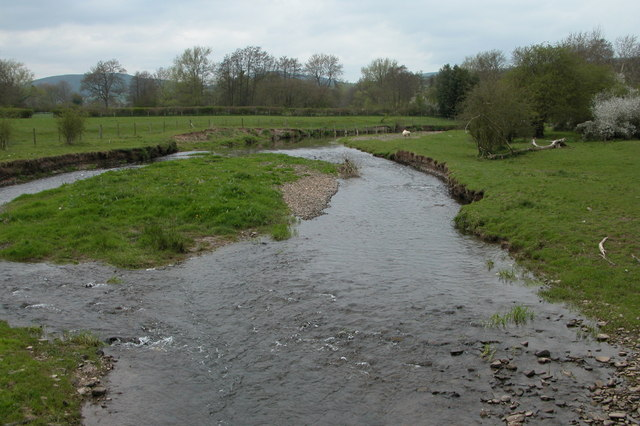
- The River Clun near Purslow

- Location within Shropshire
- OS grid reference: SJ359809
- Civil parish: Clunbury
- Unitary authority: Shropshire
- Ceremonial county: Shropshire
- Region: West Midlands
- Country: England
- Sovereign state: United Kingdom
- Post town: CRAVEN ARMS
- Postcode district: SY7
- Dialling code: 01588
- Police: West Mercia
- Fire: Shropshire
- Ambulance: West Midlands
- UK Parliament: Ludlow

Purslow is a hamlet in south Shropshire, England. It is located on the B4368 between the towns of Clun and Craven Arms, on a minor crossroads.

Purslow gave its name to a hundred and there is a pub at the crossroads called the "Hundred House". There is also a manor house which has existed in some form since the twelfth century. It is believed the name originally comes from the naming of 'Pusse's barrow'. A coat of arms exists for the Purslow family.

Sited at the crossroads opposite the Hundred House pub is a war memorial in form of a stone obelisk to commemorate those fallen from the area, including an officer in the Gulf War (1991).

Although a tiny settlement, the annual summer Purslow Sports and Show attracts visitors (and relies on organisers) from all over the area. Highlights are a run up Clunbury Hill and the produce tent, where exhibitors compete for prizes in horticulture, cookery, and handicrafts. Held on August Bank Holiday Monday at Purslow Farm.

The hamlet forms part of the civil parish of Clunbury, a nearby village.

== See also ==
- Listed buildings in Clunbury
