= Kempton, Shropshire =

Village in Shropshire, England

Coordinates: 52.440°N 2.942°W

Kempton
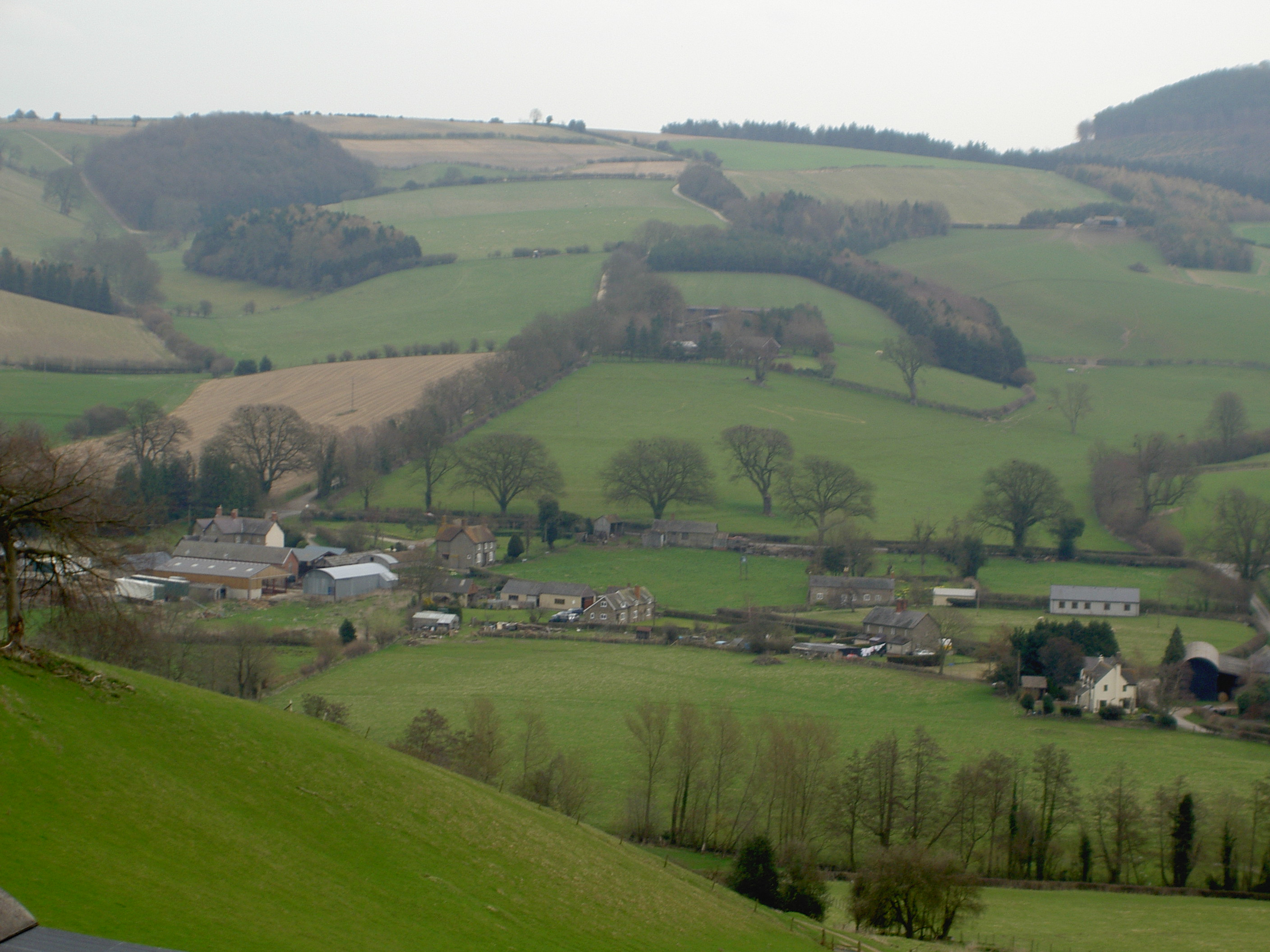
- Kempton from Merry Hill

- Location within Shropshire
- OS grid reference: SO359829
- Civil parish: Clunbury
- Unitary authority: Shropshire
- Ceremonial county: Shropshire
- Region: West Midlands
- Country: England
- Sovereign state: United Kingdom
- Post town: LYDBURY NORTH
- Postcode district: SY7
- Dialling code: 01588
- Police: West Mercia
- Fire: Shropshire
- Ambulance: West Midlands
- UK Parliament: Ludlow

Kempton is a very small village in south Shropshire, England. The village was listed as one of William de Picot's holdings in the Domesday Book of 1086. It lies on the small River Kemp, which it takes its name from.

== See also ==
- Listed buildings in Clunbury
