= Mainstone =

Village in Shropshire, England

Coordinates: 52.481°N 3.068°W

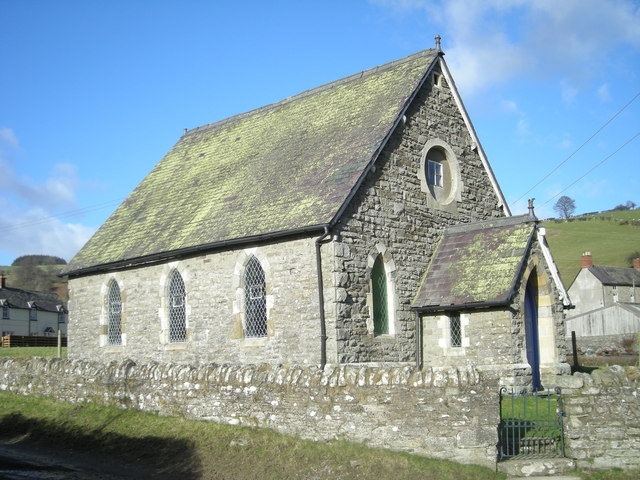
- Mainstone Primitive Methodist chapel

- Location within Shropshire
- OS grid reference: SO274875
- Civil parish: Mainstone
- Unitary authority: Shropshire
- Ceremonial county: Shropshire
- Region: West Midlands
- Country: England
- Sovereign state: United Kingdom
- Post town: BISHOPS CASTLE
- Postcode district: SY9
- Dialling code: 01588
- Police: West Mercia
- Fire: Shropshire
- Ambulance: West Midlands
- UK Parliament: Ludlow

Mainstone is a small village and civil parish in southwest Shropshire, England, near the border with Powys, Wales. The village lies approximately 1 mile northwest of the small village of Cefn Einion. The market town of Bishop's Castle lies some 3 miles to the east, while the small town of Clun is about 5 miles away to the south.

It lies in the Clun Forest, a large remote and very rural area which is semi-forested and rather hilly.

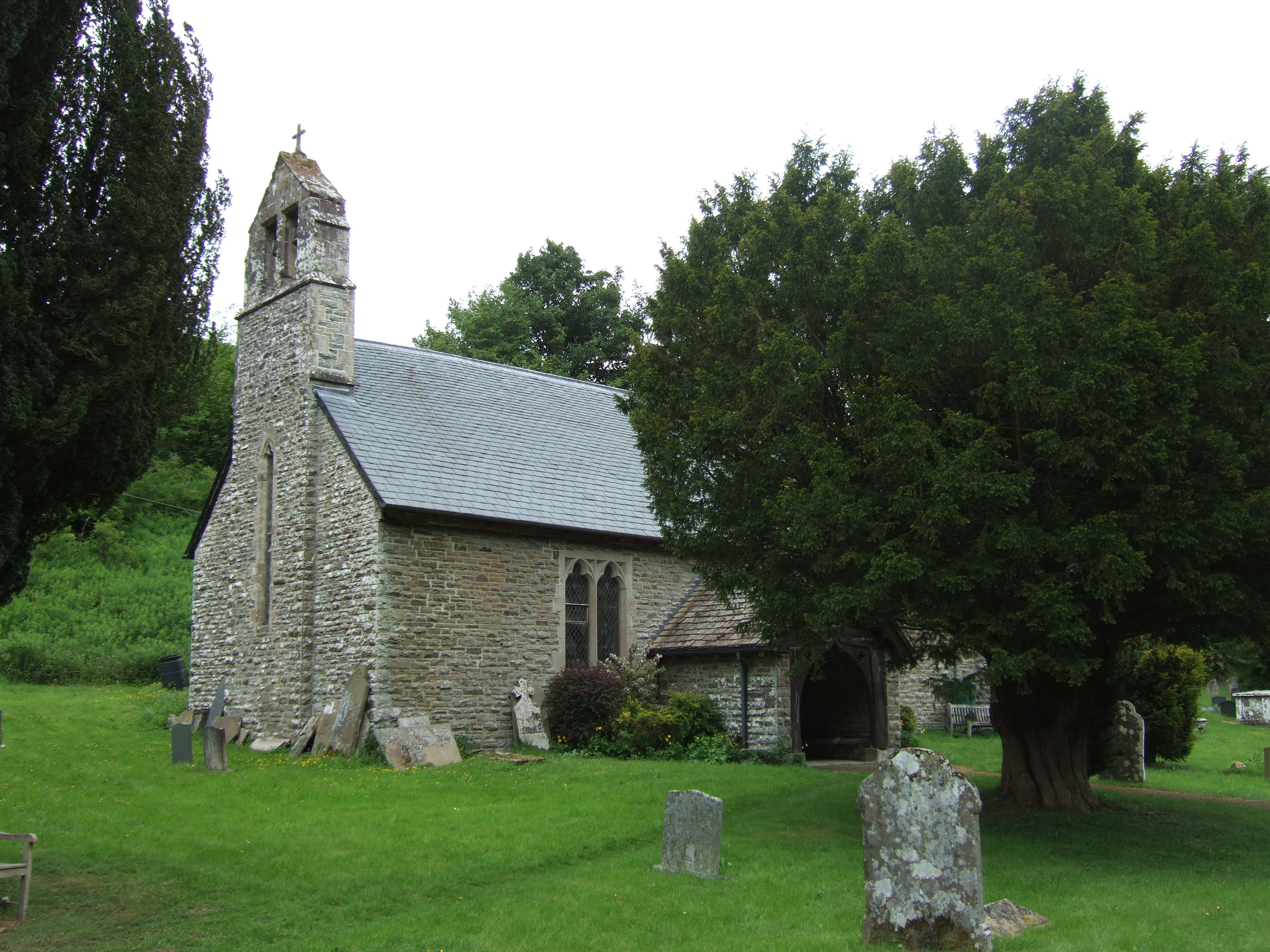
The parish church at Churchtown

The Church of England parish church, dedicated to St John the Baptist, lies in the hamlet of Churchtown (alternatively written as "Church Town") a mile west of Mainstone, though the village itself contains a Primitive Methodist chapel, built in 1892 and still in use in the mid-2000s.

The River Unk originates in and then flows through the parish. Offa's Dyke also cuts north–south through the area, bisecting the hamlet of Churchtown. The long-distance footpaths "Shropshire Way" and "Offa's Dyke Path" pass through the area and join just outside Churchtown.

Mainstone lies at around the 260m above sea level mark. The surrounding hills all peak at roughly 400-420m.

== See also ==
- Listed buildings in Mainstone
