= St Swithun's Church, Clunbury =

Coordinates: 52.4202°N 2.9265°W

St Swithin's Church, Clunbury
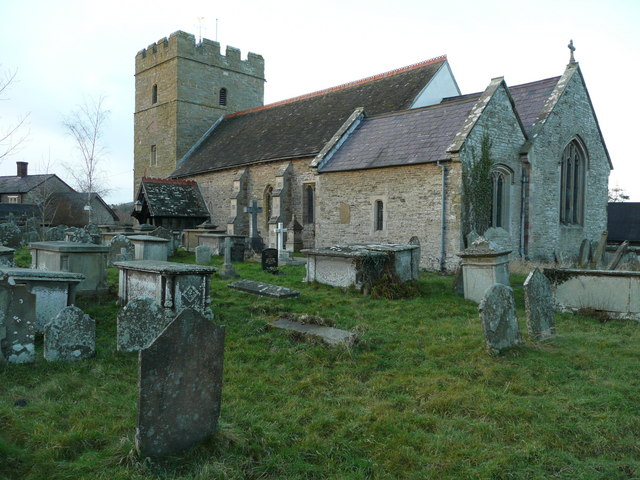
- St Swithun's Church, Clunbury, from the southeast

- Location in Shropshire
- OS grid reference: SO 371 807
- Location: Clunbury, Shropshire
- Country: England
- Denomination: Anglican
- Website: St Swithin, Clunbury

History
- Status: Parish church
- Dedication: Saint Swithun

Architecture
- Functional status: Active
- Heritage designation: Grade I
- Designated: 21 March 1968
- Architect: James Piers St Aubyn (restoration)
- Architectural type: Church
- Style: Norman, Gothic, Gothic Revival

Specifications
- Materials: Limestone

Administration
- Province: Canterbury
- Diocese: Hereford
- Archdeaconry: Ludlow
- Deanery: Clun Forest
- Parish: Clunbury with Clunton

Clergy
- Vicar: Revd Caroline Harrison

St Swithun's Church is in the village of Clunbury, Shropshire, England. It is an active Anglican parish church in the deanery of Clun Forest, the archdeaconry of Ludlow, and the diocese of Hereford. Its benefice is united with those of St Mary, Bedstone, St Cuthbert, Clungunford, St Mary, Clunton, and St Edward, Hopton Castle. The church is recorded in the National Heritage List for England as a designated Grade I listed building.

== History ==
The church originated in the 12th century as a chapel of ease to St George's Church, Clun, achieving parochial status in 1341. Additions and alterations were made to it in the 14th and 15th centuries. There were further alterations in 1842, and in 1848 when the organ chamber was added. The church was restored in 1881 by James Piers St Aubyn, including the addition of a timber-framed south porch.

== Architecture ==
=== Exterior ===
St Swithin's is constructed in limestone and roofed in slate and stone slate. Its plan consists of a three-bay nave, a chancel, a south porch, a south organ chamber, and a west tower. The tower probably dates from the late 12th century, with its top stage added as late as the 17th century. It has a west door and an 18th-century sundial in the south side. The bell openings are louvred and arched, the parapet is battlemented, and the tower is surmounted by a pyramidal cap and a brass weathercock. On the south side of the church is the timber-framed porch leading to a Norman doorway. To the right of the porch is a Norman window. The other windows on the south side of the nave are Decorated in style. Also in the south wall is an external tomb recess containing a tomb-slab carved with a cross. The south organ chamber has a west doorway. The three-light east window of the chancel contains 19th-century tracery in Perpendicular style. The north wall of the chancel contains a Norman-style window, and there is another Norman window in the north wall of the nave.

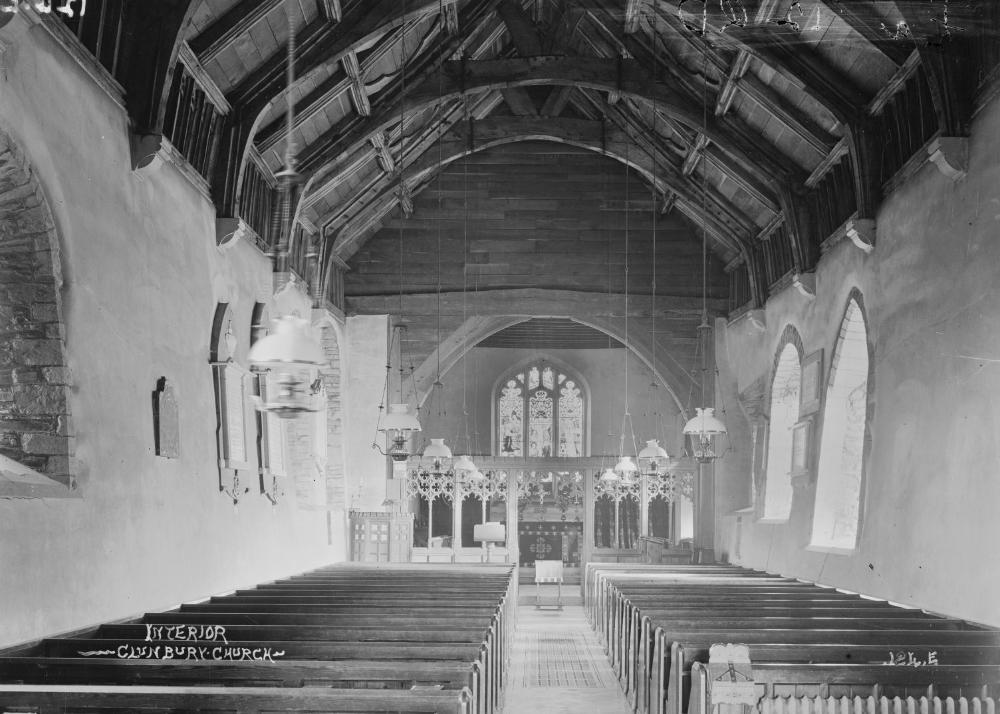
Interior of Clunbury church, 1910s

=== Interior ===
Inside the church is the original Norman west doorway of the nave; this was formerly on the exterior of the church, but now leads into the tower. Above this is a 12th-century window. The roof of the nave has been dated by dendrochronology to 1494–95. In the south wall of the nave is a trefoil-headed piscina, in a position corresponding to the external tomb recess. The font dates from the 12th century. There is stained glass in the east window and in some of the nave windows by Hardman, and in one window in the south wall of the nave is a window dated 1920 by Kempe and Company. There are separate war memorial plaques to the parish dead of the two World Wars, a slate plaque to Lieutenant Edward Whitehead (killed in First Gulf War 1991), and a prayer desk given in memory of Robert Henry Cooper and his comrades who were killed in World War II in the sinking by enemy action of MV Siamese Prince. In 2021 a five year long project financed by a legacy and grants led to the conversion of a disused vestry to provide the church with a toilet, kitchenette and an internal spiral staircase to give access to the belfry for ringers.

The two-manual pipe organ was made in 1882 by Nicholson of Worcester. There is a ring of six bells; one of these was cast in 1620 by William Clibury, and the other five in 1887 by John Warner and Sons.

== External features ==
The churchyard contains the war graves of two airmen of World War II. Also buried there is the author and former soldier Leonard Arthur Bethell, who lived at Clunton, from 1946 to his death in 1950.

== See also ==
- Grade I listed churches in Shropshire
- Listed buildings in Clunbury
