= Listed buildings in Colebatch, Shropshire =

Colebatch is a civil parish in Shropshire, England. The parish contains four listed buildings that are recorded in the National Heritage List for England. All the listed buildings are designated at Grade II, the lowest of the three grades, which is applied to "buildings of national importance and special interest". The parish contains the village of Colebatch and the surrounding countryside. The listed buildings consist of three houses and a milestone.

== Buildings ==
Name and location	Photograph	Date	Notes
Swallowbeck Cottage; 52.47747°N 3.00366°W	—	c. 14th century	The cottage is partly timber framed with cruck construction, partly in stone, partly in brick, and with a stone-slate roof. It has one storey with an attic, and one bay. The windows are casements.
Hollydene and 21A; 52.47751°N 3.00297°W	—	17th century	Originally a barn, it has been extended and converted into two dwellings. The original part is timber framed with brick nogging, some stone, and the extension is in brick. The roof over the original part is in stone slate and over the extension it is tiled. The windows are casements, with five in the upper floor and eight in the ground floor.
Brookside House; 52.47763°N 3.00467°W	—	c. 1700	The house was remodelled in the 19th century. It is in stuccoed stone with a slate roof, and has two storeys, three bays, and a rear outshut. There is a gabled porch with seats, and mullioned and transomed windows containing casements.
Milestone; 52.47166°N 3.00932°W	—	Mid to late 19th century	The milestone is on the east side of the A488 road. It consists of a round-headed stone inscribed with the distances in miles to Bishop's Castle, to Clun, and to Knighton.
