= Cefn Einion =

Hamlet in Shropshire, England

Coordinates: 52.468°N 3.052°W

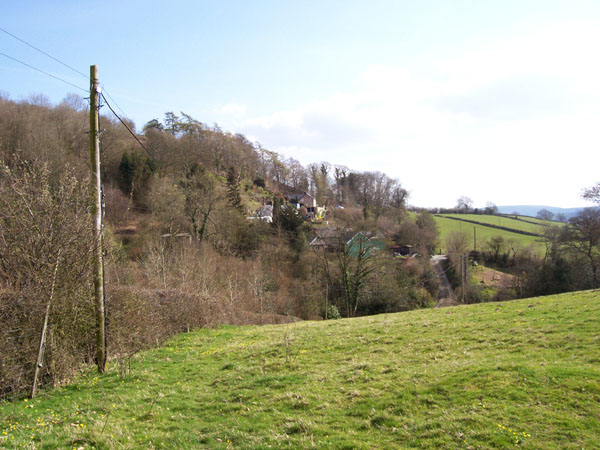
- Cefn Einion, beneath Bryn Hill

- Location within Shropshire
- OS grid reference: SO285861
- Civil parish: Mainstone
- Unitary authority: Shropshire
- Ceremonial county: Shropshire
- Region: West Midlands
- Country: England
- Sovereign state: United Kingdom
- Post town: BISHOPS CASTLE
- Postcode district: SY9
- Dialling code: 01588
- Police: West Mercia
- Fire: Shropshire
- Ambulance: West Midlands
- UK Parliament: Ludlow

Cefn Einion is a dispersed hamlet in southwest Shropshire, England. It is located two miles southwest of the village of Colebatch, and lies between the small villages of Bryn and Mainstone.

Cefn Einion in Welsh means Einion's Ridge; the name 'Einion' could refer to any of several Einions in recorded history.

The nearest towns are Clun and Bishop's Castle (both small). The village lies at 280m above sea level.

The minor River Unk runs to the west of the village.
