= Listed buildings in Mainstone =

Mainstone is a civil parish in Shropshire, England. It contains nine listed buildings that are recorded in the National Heritage List for England. Of these, one is at Grade II*, the middle of the three grades, and the others are at Grade II, the lowest grade. The parish contains the small village of Mainstone and the surrounding countryside, and the listed buildings are scattered around the parish. Most of them are farmhouses and farm buildings, and the other listed buildings are a house, a church, and a memorial in the churchyard.

== Key ==
Grade	Criteria
II*	Particularly important buildings of more than special interest
II	Buildings of national importance and special interest

== Buildings ==
Name and location	Photograph	Date	Notes	Grade
St John the Baptist's Church; 52.47911°N 3.08422°W		12th century	The church was almost completely rebuilt in 1886–87 by Thomas Nicholson. It is in limestone with sandstone dressings, and has a roof partly in stone-slate and partly tiled. It consists of a nave with a south porch and a chancel with a north vestry. At the west end is a double bellcote. Inside, many of the original features have been retained.	II*
Lower Edenhope Farmhouse; 52.49338°N 3.06965°W	—	Late 16th century (probable)	The farmhouse was remodelled in the 19th century. It is timber framed and rendered, it has been partly rebuilt and refaced in limestone, and the roof is slated. There are two storeys and five bays. On the front is a porch, the doorway has a bracketed flat hood, and the windows are casements.	II
Reilth Farmhouse; 52.47523°N 3.06232°W	—	Late 16th century (probable)	The farmhouse was altered and extended in the 18th and 19th centuries. Originally timber framed, it has been extended and refaced in limestone, and has a slate roof. There are two storeys and an attic, a plan of a hall and a single-storey cross-wing, and a front of four bays. On the front is a two-storey gabled porch that has unfluted Doric columns and a partial entablature. The windows are casements, and there is a datestone in the gable of the cross-wing.	II
Hillend Farmhouse; 52.48918°N 3.06865°W	—	c.1650	The farmhouse is in rendered timber framing and has a slate roof. There are two storeys, two bays, and an outshut at the southwest. The windows are casements.	II
Barn, Lower Knuck; 52.47627°N 3.07649°W	—	17th century	The barn is timber framed with weatherboarding on a limestone plinth. There are 4½ bays, and it contains a central door on the north side and three doors on the south.	II
Old Mill; 52.48463°N 3.06241°W	—	Early 18th century (probable)	A former mill house, it is in limestone and has a tile roof, hipped to the left. There is one storey and an attic, four bays, and a flat-roofed extension to the left. The windows are casements.	II
Mainstone House; 52.48316°N 3.06802°W	—	Early 18th century (probable)	A limestone farmhouse with sandstone quoins and a slate roof. There is one storey and an attic, three bays, and a rear kitchen wing. On the front is a gabled wooden porch, the ground floor windows are cross-windows, and above are sash windows and a central lunette.	II
Cow Houses, Reilth Farm; 52.47532°N 3.06195°W	—	Mid 18th century	The range of cow houses was extended in the 19th century. It's in limestone, with a roof partly in stone-slate and partly in corrugated iron. The range contains doorways and loft doors, and at the left gable end are steps.	II
Sankey Memorial; 52.47904°N 3.08379°W	—	c. 1835	The memorial is in the churchyard of St John the Baptist's churchyard, and is to the memory of Richard Sankey and his wife. It is in sandstone, and consists of a chest tomb, and has a chamfered plinth, free-standing corner balusters, recessed panels, and a moulded cornice to a chamfered top.	II
