= River Kemp =

River in Shropshire, England

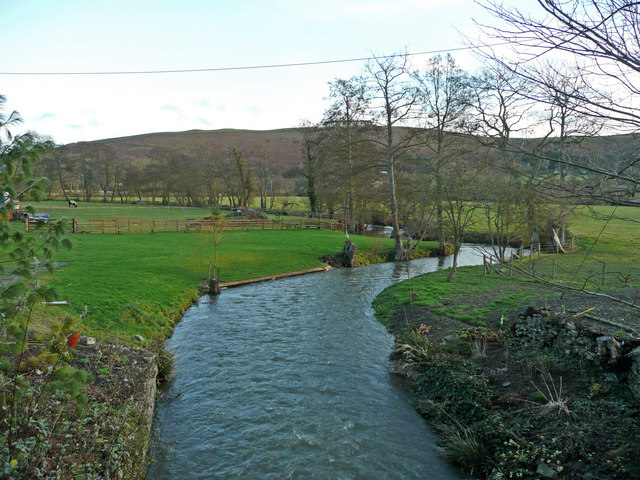
- The Kemp near to the confluence with the Clun

Location
- Country: England
- Counties: Shropshire

Physical characteristics
- Mouth
  - location: River Clun, Shropshire
  - coordinates: 52.428°N 2.912°W
- Length: 17.3 km (10.7 mi)
- Basin size: 51 km^{2} (20 sq mi)

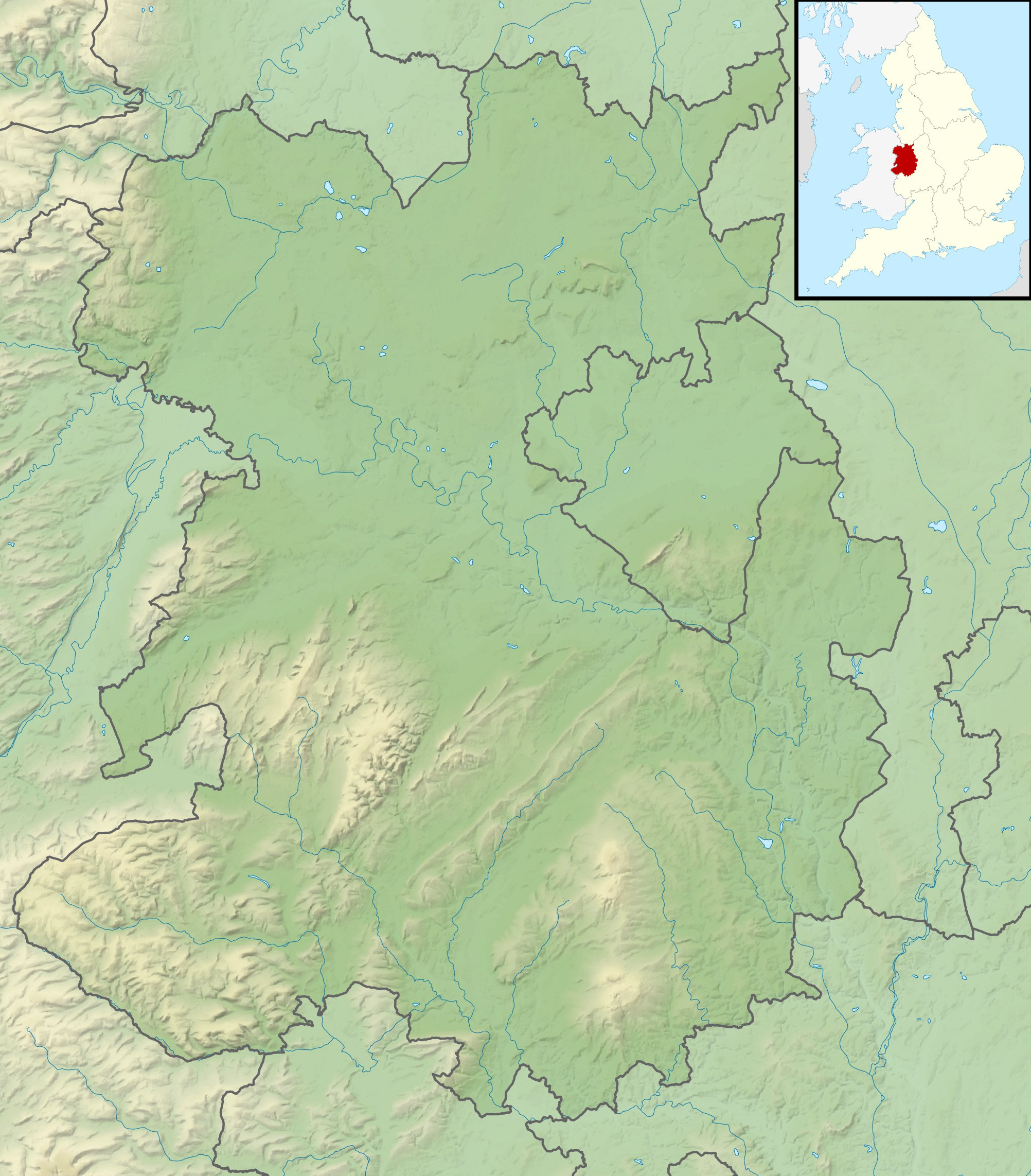
Map of Shropshire - showing the source and mouth of the River Kemp

The River Kemp is a tributary of the River Clun which flows through Shropshire, England.

== Course ==
The river is formed from two small unnamed streams that drain the area around Bishops Castle, the stream on the western side of the town rises near Bishops Moat and flows south-easterly in a well defined valley. The stream to the east rises on Lydham Heath near Lea and flows in a south-westerly direction to converge with the western stream to the east of Colebatch. The River Kemp begins at the confluence of these two streams.

From this point the river then flows south, to reach the hamlet of Brockton, where it turns in a south-easterly direction to pass through the grounds of Walcot Hall, near Lydbury North. Here the river feeds the large lake known as Walcot Pool, which was allegedly constructed by French prisoners of war from the Napoleonic War.

To the south of Walcot Park, it is crossed by the Shropshire Way and then passes through the village of Kempton, where there is a ford and footbridge. The river continues due south, until it reaches the Clun valley near Clunbury. It joins the larger river to the east of the village at Oaker near Aston on Clun.

The total length of the Kemp is 10.7 miles (17.3 km). The drainage basin for the river, which lies between that of the River Unk to the west, and that of the River Onny to the north, has a catchment area of 51 square kilometres (20 mi^{2}).

== Ecology ==
The River Kemp was classed as having moderate ecological quality under the Water Framework Directive in 2009, but this regressed to poor in 2016. Chemical quality remained good throughout the monitoring period. The five part framework scale ranges from high, good, and moderate, through to poor and finally bad.

== See also ==
- List of rivers of England
