= Clunton =

Village in Shropshire, England

Coordinates: 52.425°N 2.980°W

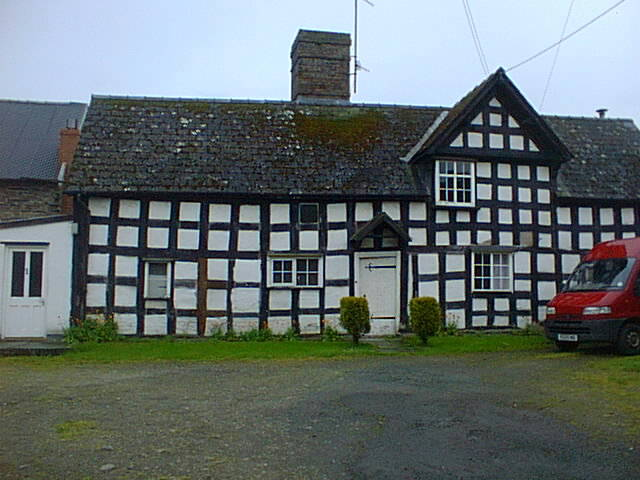
- Timber-framed house

- Location within Shropshire
- OS grid reference: SO334813
- Civil parish: Clunbury
- Unitary authority: Shropshire
- Ceremonial county: Shropshire
- Region: West Midlands
- Country: England
- Sovereign state: United Kingdom
- Post town: CRAVEN ARMS
- Postcode district: SY7
- Dialling code: 01588
- Police: West Mercia
- Fire: Shropshire
- Ambulance: West Midlands
- UK Parliament: Ludlow

Clunton is a village in south Shropshire, England, to the east of the small town of Clun.

== Location ==
It lies on the B4368 road between Clun and Craven Arms. It is part of the civil parish of Clunbury. The nearest railway station is Hoptonheath. The village is at 162 m (531 ft) above sea level. SO334813

The village centres on the B4368, though it branches southwards at Clunton Bridge (which crosses the River Clun). Near the centre is "The Crown" pub and St. Mary's Church.

== The Crown ==
In 1994 the village public house, The Crown, was threatened with closure. A group of locals clubbed together and bought it, rather than lose it altogether . They still own it today. The pub is co-owned by 30 people, mostly locals. It remains a traditional country pub, with a selection of local real ales; The Crown has an entry in the CAMRA Good Beer Guide 2015.

== Clunton Coppice ==
Nearby to the south of the village is Clunton Coppice, a 23.6 hectares (58 acres) remnant of the oak coppice woodland which was abundant in this part of Shropshire formerly, which is situated on a steep slope and grows over acidic rather infertile soil. This woodland is dominated by sessile oak with birch and hazel scattered among the oaks along with holly and rowan. The herb layer in these woods is typical of this type of woodland with its acid soil and includes wavy hair-grass, creeping soft-grass, greater woodrush, bilberry, ling, hard fern, common cow-wheat and bracken. One notable species, scarce in Shropshire, the oak fern has been recorded here. Also typical of these western woods the mosses Dicranum majus and Rhytidiadelphus loreus are abundant.

== In culture ==
In A Shropshire Lad, A. E. Housman used - but did not actually write - the verse:

Clunton and Clunbury,

Clungunford and Clun,
Are the quietest places

Under the sun.

North of Clunton Coppice there is a hill fort at Bury Ditches at which is reputed for its views and is a reminder that this area has been inhabited for millennia.

== Notable people ==
- Leonard Arthur Bethell (1878-1950) soldier and author, lived at The Warren, Clunton, from 1946 to his death in 1950.
- John Osborne (1929–1994) playwright, who wrote Look Back in Anger, lived at The Hurst in Clunton, where he died.

== See also ==
- Listed buildings in Clunbury
