= Clunbury =

Village in Shropshire, England

Coordinates: 52.419°N 2.926°W

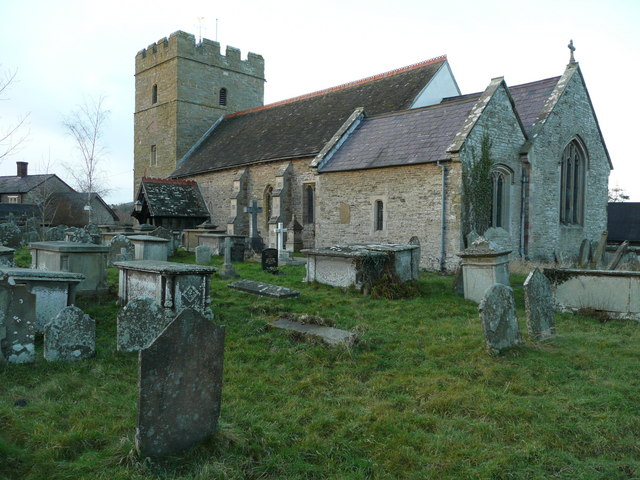
- St Swithun's Church in Clunbury

- Location within Shropshire
- Population: 552 (2011)
- OS grid reference: SO371805
- Civil parish: Clunbury
- Unitary authority: Shropshire
- Ceremonial county: Shropshire
- Region: West Midlands
- Country: England
- Sovereign state: United Kingdom
- Post town: CRAVEN ARMS
- Postcode district: SY7
- Dialling code: 01588
- Police: West Mercia
- Fire: Shropshire
- Ambulance: West Midlands
- UK Parliament: Ludlow

Clunbury is a village and civil parish in south Shropshire, England.

It is near to the small town of Clun and the villages of Clunton, Purslow and Aston on Clun. In the village is the Norman Church of St Swithin and a Church of England primary school.

The village lies between 145m and 155m above sea level. To the north the Clun and Kemp rivers flow, before meeting to the northeast. A lane runs up to the B4368 / B4385 crossroads at Little Brampton, and crosses these rivers by bridges.

== History ==
The Domesday Book lists Cluneberie within the ancient hundred of Rinlau in 1086, one of many possessions of Picot de Say. From the 12th century through the 19th century, Clunbury was situated in Purslow hundred.

== Church ==
The church is called St Swithun's Church.

== Education ==
In November 2007, Clunbury Primary School was awarded the Becta ICT Excellence Award for its use of technology.

== In culture ==
Clunton and Clunbury,
Clungunford and Clun,
Are the quietest places
Under the sun.

— A.E. Housman, L, A Shropshire Lad

Ida Gandy describes life in Clunbury in the 1930s in her book An idler on the Shropshire borders.

== See also ==
- Listed buildings in Clunbury
