= Frank Coutts (Australian footballer) =

Australian rules footballer, born 1905

Personal information
- Full name: Frank Coutts
- Born: 27 February 1905
- Died: 24 May 1963 (aged 58)
- Original team: Hamilton

Playing career^{1}
Years	Club	Games (Goals)
1928	North Melbourne	4 (6)
- ^{1} Playing statistics correct to the end of 1928.

Frank Coutts (27 February 1905 – 24 May 1963) was an Australian rules footballer who played with North Melbourne in the Victorian Football League (VFL).
