= Frank Coutts Hendry =

Frank Coutts Hendry OBE, MC (1875–1955) served in the Indian Army Reserve, Merchant Navy, Rangoon Pilot Service, was an Indian Army officer, and author. His Military Cross is in the Royal Museums Greenwich collections. Several of his books were published by William Blackwood's Blackwood's Magazine and William Blackwood & Sons. He used the pseudonym Shalimar. Hendry was an influence on Courtenay Latiner.

Hendry wrote from his own experiences. His time at sea included on Singapore ships. Hendry eventually retired to Grantown on Spey, Morayshire, Scotland to focus on writing.

== Bibliography ==
- A Windjammer's Half Deck
- The Ocean Tramp
- Land and Sea
- From all the seas (1933)
- One Monsoon Night (1936)
- Down to the Sea (1937)
- From the Log Book of Memory
- True tales of sail and steam
- Sail Ho!
- The Yomah-and after
- En havets demon
- Deep seas and shoal rivers
- The peaceful wanderer
- From the log-book of memory (1950), an autobiography
- Around the horn and home again: and other tales (1929)
- Through the gap, short story
- Easting Down, short story
