= River Unk, Shropshire =

River in Shropshire, England

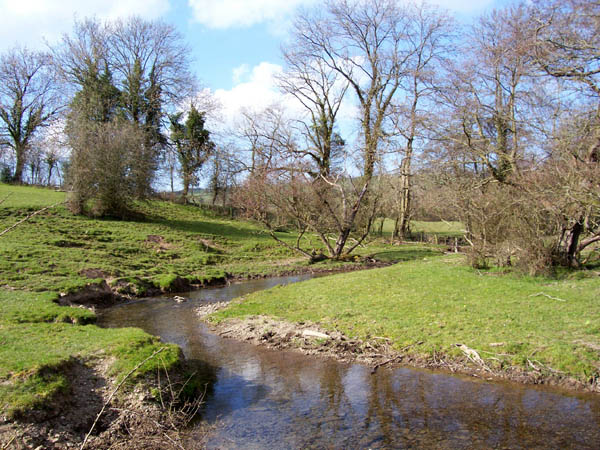
River Unk near Cefn Einion

The River Unk is a small river in Shropshire, England that runs for 9.7 miles (15.6 km) before flowing into the River Clun.

== Course ==
It rises close to the site of the Early Medieval dyke known as the Lower Short Ditch on the Shropshire - Powys border in the north of Clun Forest and flows in a generally easterly direction for around 2.5 miles (4 km) before turning southward near Lower Edenhope, heading past Mainstone, Cefn Einion, and Bicton for 6.8 miles (11 km) and joining the River Clun near the Castle in the town of Clun.

== Nature ==
The river is one of the few remaining sites in the United Kingdom where freshwater pearl mussels are found. The Environment Agency has taken land next to the banks of the river to prevent cattle entering the water and silting up the riverbed.
