= River Clun, Shropshire =

River in Shropshire, England

River Clun
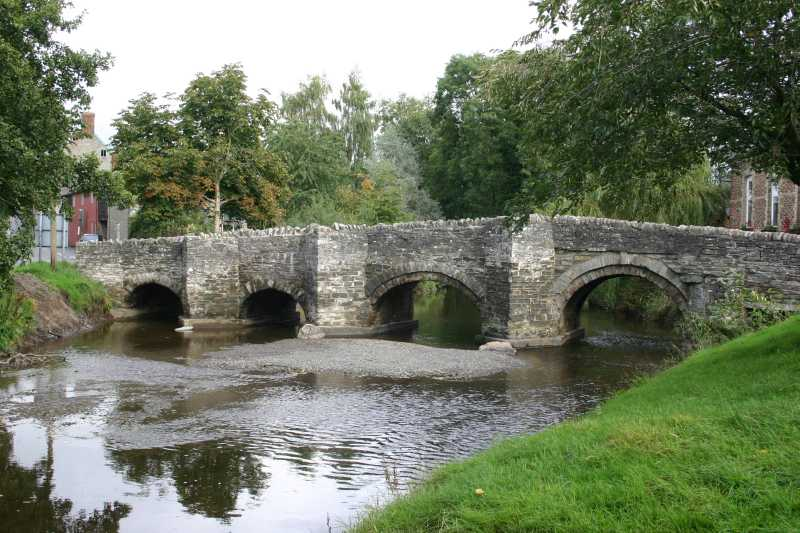
- The river flowing through the town of Clun, in which the historic packhorse bridge is still the only vehicle-carrying bridge.
- Etymology: Colun (British)

Location
- Country: England, United Kingdom
- Region: West Midlands
- County: Shropshire, Herefordshire
- Cities: Newcastle, Clun, Clunton, Clungunford

Physical characteristics
- Source
  - location: Anchor, Shropshire
- Mouth: Confluence with River Teme
  - location: Leintwardine, Herefordshire
  - coordinates: 52.3598°N 2.8785°W
  - elevation: 119 m (390 ft)
- Length: 45.84 km (28.48 mi)
- Basin size: 300 km^{2} (120 sq mi)
- Discharge
  - location: Leintwardine

Basin features
- Tributaries
  - left: River Unk, River Kemp
  - right: River Redlake

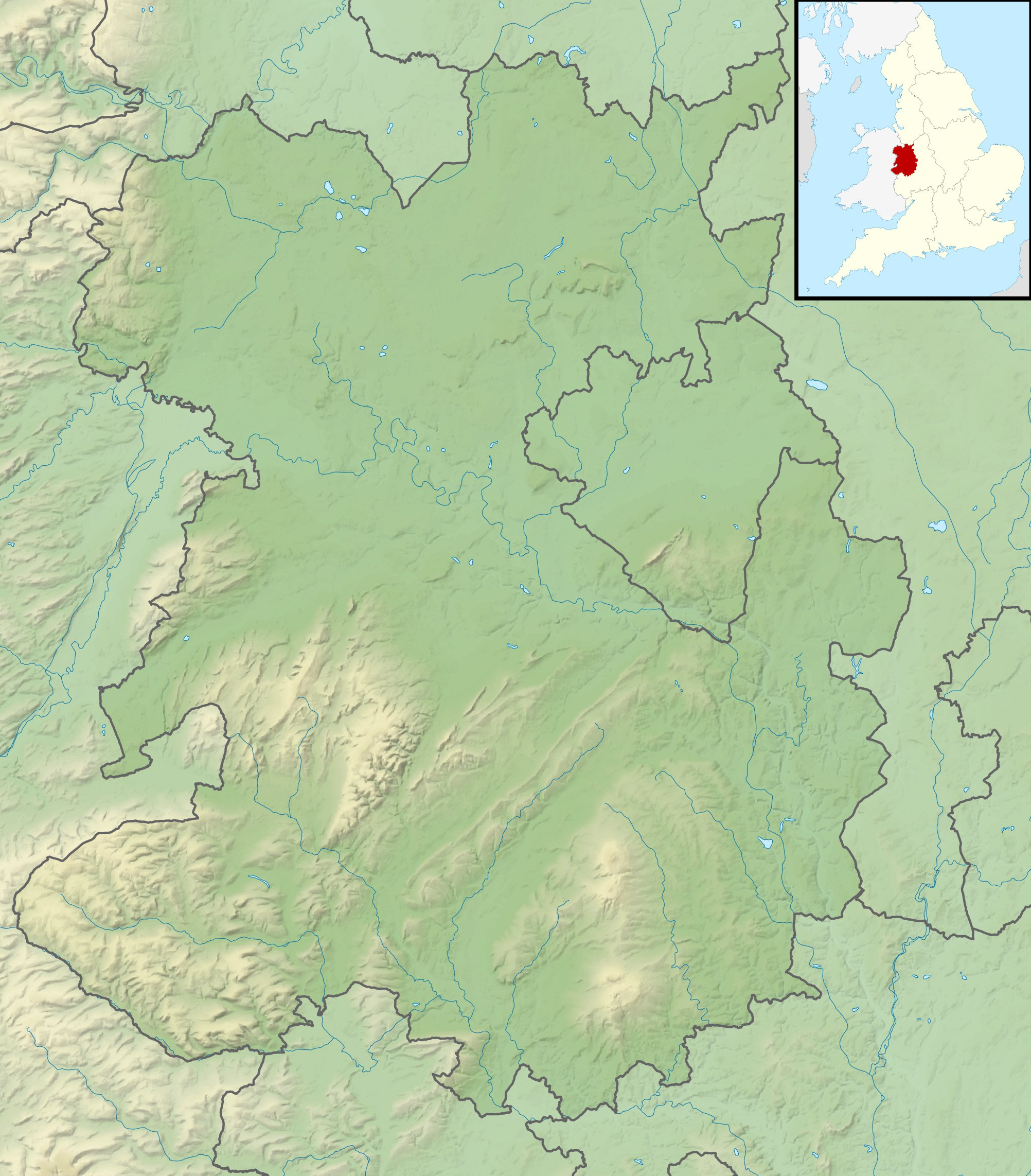
Map showing the source in Shropshire, and the mouth in Herefordshire of the River Clun

The River Clun runs mostly through Shropshire, England and joins the River Teme at Leintwardine, Herefordshire. The Clun Valley is part of the Shropshire Hills AONB (Area of Outstanding Natural Beauty).

== Course ==
The River Clun has its source near the hamlet of Anchor (in a marshy area near the public house), close to the border of Wales. It flows east through the small town of Clun until Aston on Clun where it flows roughly southwards — the river flows around the north of Clunbury Hill. The river enters the lower valley — which widens and has a flatter floor (an extensive flood plain).

The Folly Brook joins the Clun at Newcastle, and the River Unk flows into the Clun near Clun Castle, whilst the River Kemp flows into the river at Oaker near Aston. Near the end of the river's course, the River Redlake joins at Jay.

Just south of Broadward (a Site of Special Scientific Interest for a stretch south of Broadward Bridge) the river flows into Herefordshire where it joins the River Teme.

== Features ==
Many settlements along the course of the river incorporate the river's name, including Clun, and the villages of Newcastle-on-Clun, Clunton, Clunbury, Aston on Clun, and Clungunford. In Clun, the historic Clun Bridge still takes the A488 road over the river. A number of other historic crossings — bridges and fords — exist over the river, including Broadward Bridge.

== Ecology ==
The River Clun is an ideal habitat for otters, salmon, white-clawed crayfish, European bullhead, grayling and brook lamprey. The river is also noted as a habitat for the freshwater pearl mussel. The Clun and one of its tributaries, the Unk, have suffered pollution and sediment build up, undermining the mussel's habitat. The catchment area of the river is mostly rural and produces beef, lamb, potatoes and maize.

The Clun is one of only eleven watercourses in England that is home to the mussel and one of three English rivers that has been designated a European Special Area of Conservation.

A citizen science project, the River Clun Monitoring Group, has been established to monitor, and track changes in, the river's ecological condition.

== See also ==
- Clun Forest
- Offa's Dyke
