= Bucknell =

Bucknell may refer to:

== Places ==
- Bucknell, Oxfordshire, England
- Bucknell, Shropshire, England
- Bucknell railway station, Shropshire, England
- Bucknell Ridge Antarctica
- Bucknell Wood Meadows, Northamptonshire, England

== Educational institutions ==
- Bucknell University, Pennsylvania, United States

== People ==
- Barry Bucknell, Robert "Barry" Barraby Bucknell was an English TV presenter who popularised Do It Yourself (DIY)
- Katherine Bucknell, an American scholar and novelist
- John Bucknell (7 June 1872 – 5 March 1925) was an English cricket player.
- William Bucknell, American Businessman, and benefactor of Bucknell University.
- Margaret Bucknell Pecorini, American painter.
- Peter Bucknell, a filmmaker, an author and classical violist residing in Barcelona.

== See also ==
- Bucknall (disambiguation)
