= Stowe, Shropshire =

Village in Shropshire, England

Coordinates: 52.355°N 3.012°W

Stowe
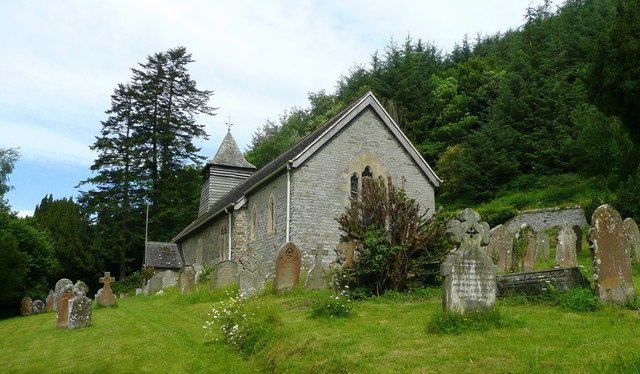
- St. Michael's church, Stowe

- Location within Shropshire
- Population: 140 (2011)
- OS grid reference: SO310735
- Civil parish: Stowe
- Unitary authority: Shropshire
- Ceremonial county: Shropshire
- Region: West Midlands
- Country: England
- Sovereign state: United Kingdom
- Post town: KNIGHTON
- Postcode district: LD7
- Dialling code: 01547
- Police: West Mercia
- Fire: Shropshire
- Ambulance: West Midlands
- UK Parliament: Ludlow

Stowe or Stow is a small village and civil parish in south Shropshire, England.

The parish has a border with Wales and the Welsh town of Knighton is less than two miles to the southwest of the village; a very small part of the town (including Knighton station) actually lies within Stowe parish and Shropshire. The population of the civil ward in the United Kingdom Census of 2011 was 140. In the 2021 census the population has dropped to 120 in 60 households.

Also nearby is the Salopian village of Bucknell and the Welsh hamlet of Milebrook.

The A488 passes through the parish and the A4113 road passes nearby.

== Parish meeting ==
Instead of a parish council it has a parish meeting; this is due to the very small population of the parish. The parish is represented by an elected chairman, these have been

- Mrs Peggy Pickup 1981 - 1991
- Mrs M L Blyghton 1991 - 1993
- Bill Parker 1993 - 1994
- Brenda Sadler 1994 - 2003
- Liz Trow 2003 - 2007
- Connor Birch 2007 - 2012
- Roger Casstles 2012 - 2016
- Colin Bentley 2016 - 2023
- Jimmy Garnier 2023 -

== See also ==
- Listed buildings in Stowe, Shropshire
