= Brandon Camp =

Hillfort in Herefordshire, England

- Location within Herefordshire
- 52°20′46″N 2°52′54″W
- Type: Hillfort
- Periods: Iron Age, Roman
- Location: near Leintwardine, Herefordshire
- OS grid reference: SO 400 724

Site notes
- Excavation dates: 1981–1985
- Archaeologists: Sheppard Frere; J. K. St Joseph

Scheduled monument
- Designated: 28 November 1934
- Reference no.: 1011016

Brandon Camp is an archaeological site, about 1 mile south of Leintwardine, in Herefordshire. England. It is a hillfort of the Iron Age, which later became a Roman fort. The site is a scheduled monument.

== Description ==
The visible defences consist of a single bank forming a roughly triangular enclosure, with rounded angles and slightly curved sides, on the western side of Brandon Hill. The maximum dimensions are about 250 metres (820 ft) west to east and 260 metres (850 ft) north to south, enclosing about 3.5 hectares (8.6 acres). The shape of the hill has determined the location of the defences. There is a precipitous slope on the north-west side, thought to have been artificially steepened. There is a clearly defined rampart on the east and south sides. An entrance on the north side, which has been widened, is probably original; there is an entrance on the east side, also widened, and a modern entrance on the south.

The hillfort Coxall Knoll lies about 3 kilometres (1.9 mi) to the west-north-west, across the River Teme, and there are buried remains of Roman camps in between, including Buckton Roman Fort.

== Cropmarks and excavation ==
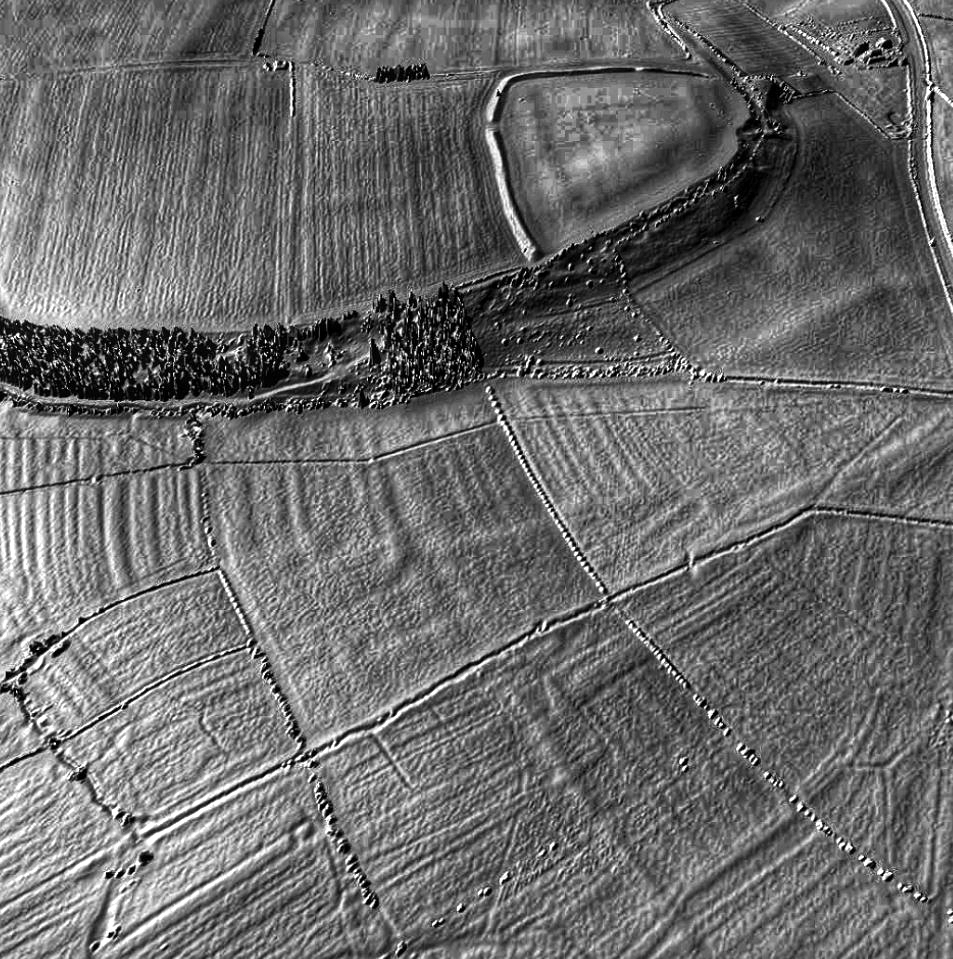
A lidar view looking across to Brandon Camp Iron Age Hillfort and Roman Fort

Aerial photographs taken in 1959 and 1965 showed cropmarks inside the defences, in particular a rectangular area 14.5 by 32 metres (48 by 105 ft) just inside the eastern entrance, thought to be a Roman granary. Aerial photographs of 1965 and 1976 showed that the original Iron Age fort probably occupied most of the hilltop; this suggested that the visible defences date from the Roman period and that, like Hod Hill in Dorset, a Roman fort was built on a captured British fort.

The features seen were investigated by excavation in the early 1980s by Sheppard Frere and J. K. St Joseph. The presence of the granary was confirmed. Immediately to the west were three widely separated canabae, two-roomed huts thought to be accommodation for officers. There were nine huts to the north, spaced more closely together, on either side of what may have been a road. A large circular feature seen as crop-marks on aerial photographs was found to be a Bronze Age ring ditch; nearby there was an Iron Age enclosure ditch. These were partly overlaid by a group of buildings around three sides of a courtyard, with other buildings adjacent to this. The area was interpreted as a combined Roman praetorium (commandant's house) and principia (regimental headquarters). There were finds including shards of Samian ware dating from the reign of Nero.
