= Caer Caradoc =

Hill in Shropshire, England

Coordinates: 52.55302°N 2.77279°W

Caer Caradoc Hill
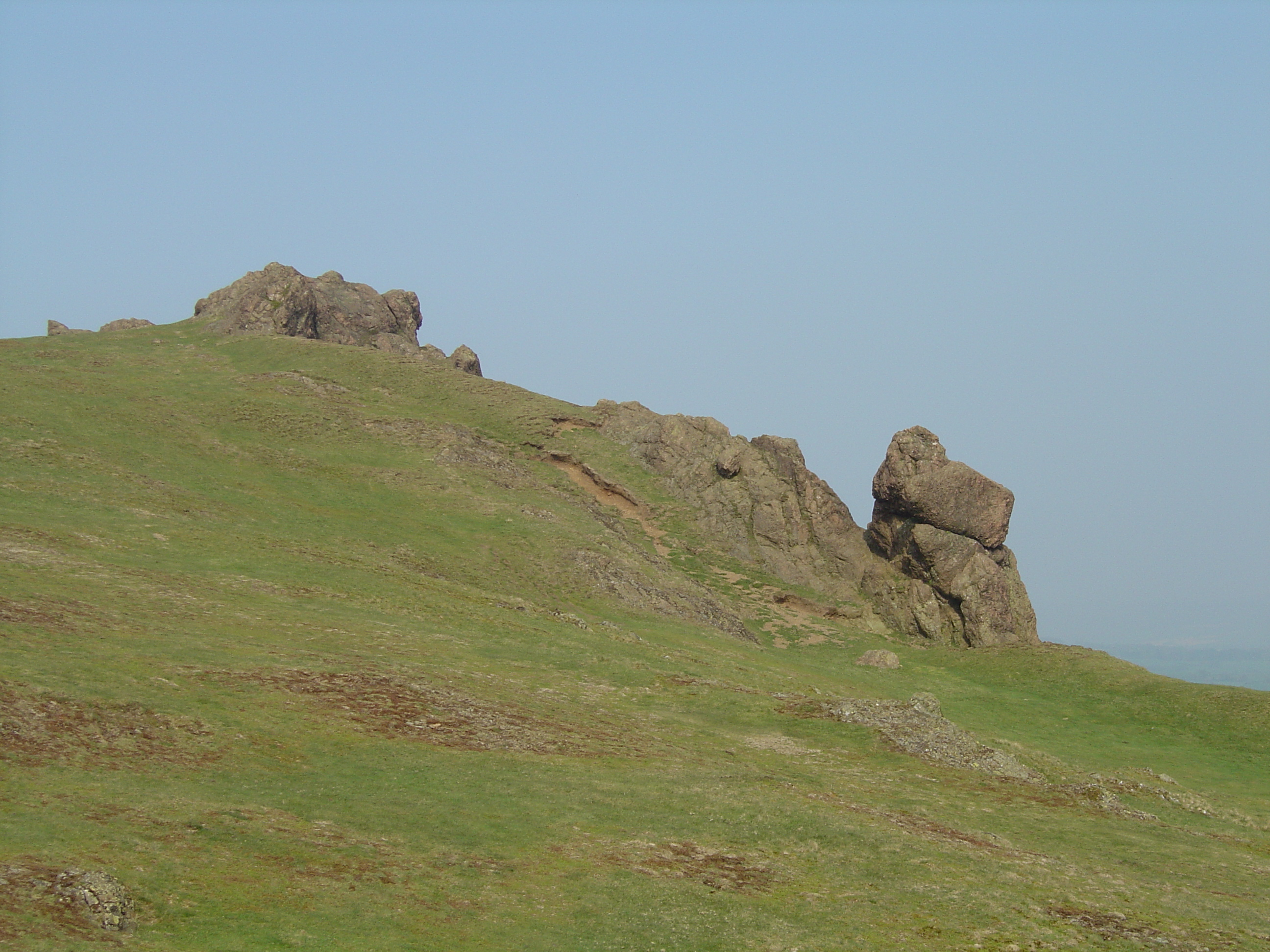
- Caer Caradoc

Highest point
- Elevation: 1,506 ft (459 m)
- Prominence: 889 ft (271 m)
- Listing: Marilyn

Naming
- Native name: Caer Caradog (Welsh)

Geography
- Location: Shropshire, England
- Parent range: Shropshire Hills
- OS grid: SO477953
- Topo map: OS Landranger 137, 138

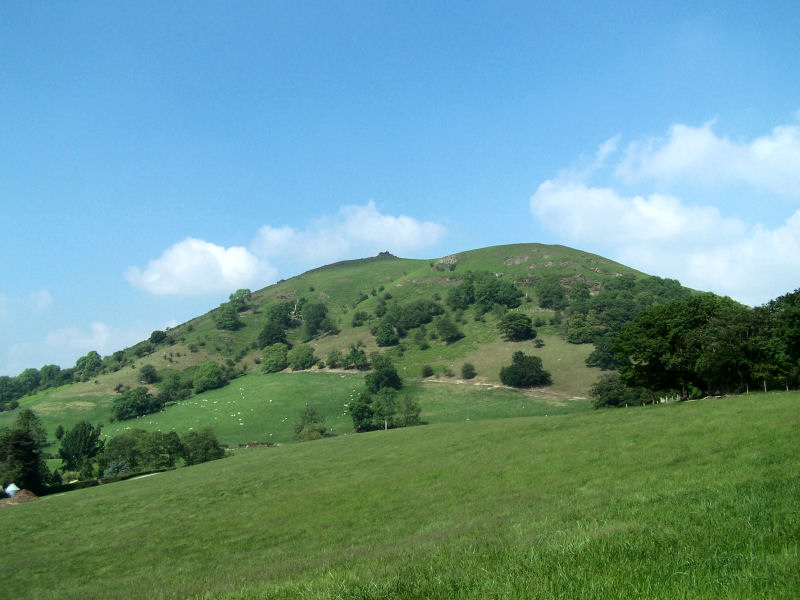
Looking up towards Caer Caradoc from Church Stretton.

Caer Caradoc (Welsh: Caer Caradog, the fort of Caradog) is a hill in the English county of Shropshire. It overlooks the town of Church Stretton and the village of All Stretton and offers panoramic views to the north towards the Wrekin, east to Wenlock Edge, and west over the nearby Long Mynd. It is not to be confused with another hillfort of the same name 1 km west of Chapel Lawn near Bucknell.

Caer Caradoc rises sharply out of a narrow valley known as the Stretton Gap. It is the highest point on a high, narrow, northeast–southwest "whaleback ridge", sometimes called a hogsback ridge. The Wrekin is a very similarly shaped hill and on the same alignment, some 10 miles (16 km) to the north-east. Caer Caradoc can be fairly easily climbed from Church Stretton but the ascent/descent is steep; a more gentle climb is from the village of Cardington, which lies two miles (3 km) east.

Much of the hill is composed from volcanic rocks, like the Wrekin and other hills, formed of narrow ridges of resistant Precambrian rock thrust upwards by movements deep down along the Church Stretton Fault. This fault line runs from Staffordshire in England to Pembrokeshire in Wales and can be seen on Ordnance Survey maps as a line of springs on this hill.

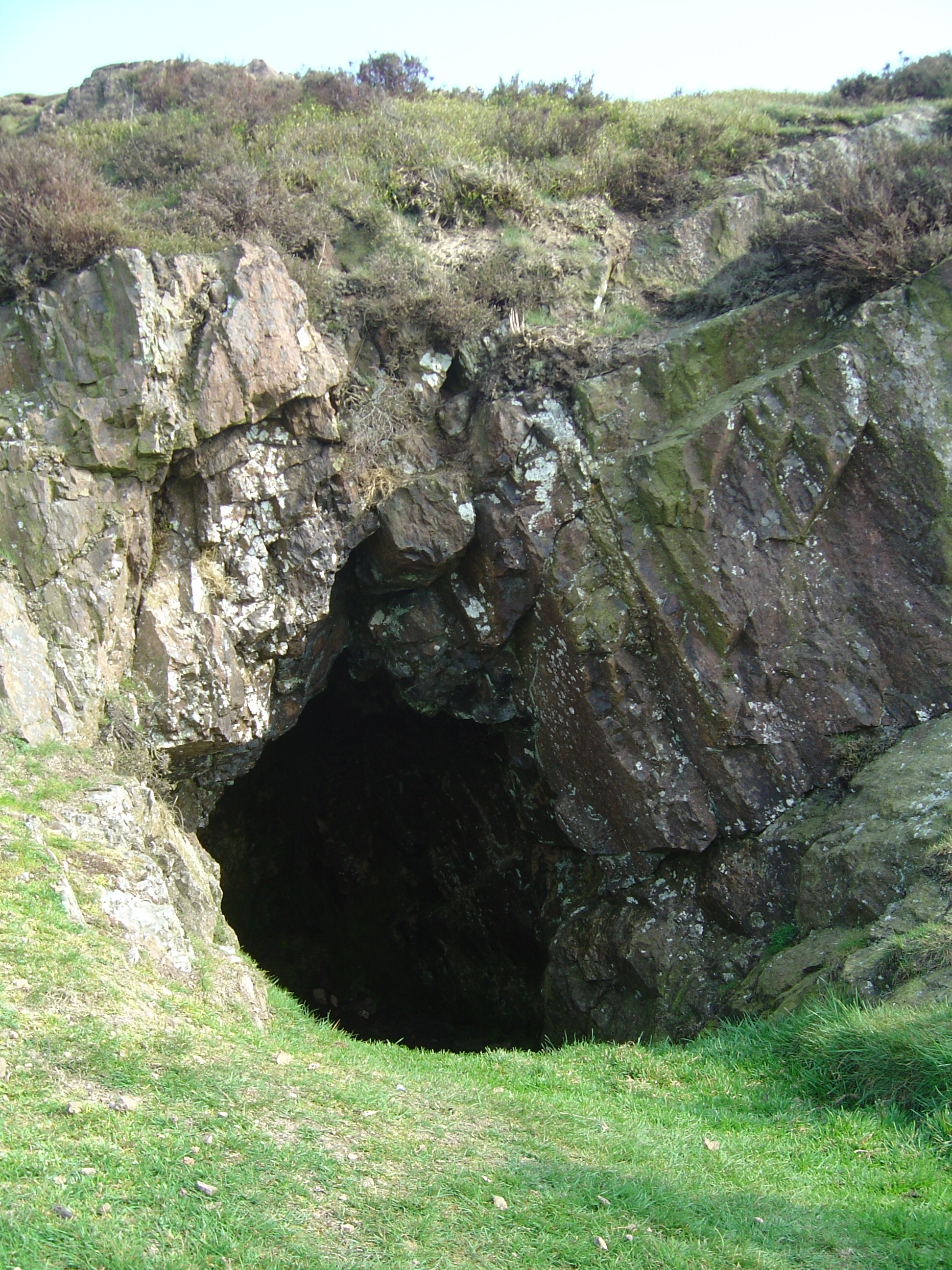
Caer Caradoc cave, near the summit

The summit has an Ancient British Iron Age or late Bronze Age hill fort. It is this which the hill is named after – Caer Caradog in Welsh meaning Caradog's fort. Local legend has it that this was the site of Caratacus' last battle against the Roman legions during the Roman conquest of Britain, and that after the battle he hid in the cave near its summit. However, there is no river nearby and Tacitus refers to a river in his description of the site.
