= Coxall Knoll =

Hill in England

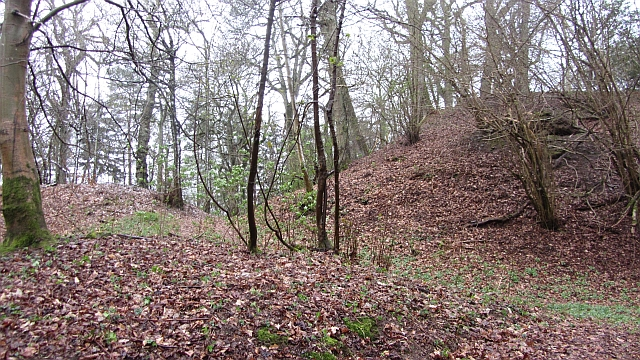
- Ramparts of Coxall Knoll

- Location within Shropshire
- 52.3553°N 2.9334°W
- Type: Hillfort
- Periods: Iron Age
- Location: near Bucknell, Shropshire
- OS grid reference: SO 366 734

Site notes
- Elevation: 262 m (860 ft)

Scheduled monument
- Designated: 3 September 1935
- Reference no.: 1014107

Coxall Knoll is a hill lying on the boundary of Shropshire and Herefordshire, England; it is near Bucknell in Shropshire and Buckton and Coxall in Herefordshire. On the summit is an Iron Age hillfort, a scheduled monument.

== Description ==
The height of the hill is 262 metres (860 ft) and it has a prominence of 120 metres (390 ft).

The hillfort Brandon Camp lies about 3 kilometres (1.9 mi) to the east-south-east, across the River Teme, and there are buried remains of Roman camps in between, including Buckton Roman Fort; so it is supposed that there was activity in the area into the Roman period.

The hillfort on the summit is roughly oval in shape, measuring about 570 metres (1,870 ft) west to east and 200 metres (660 ft) north to south. There are earthen banks following the contours of the hill; the slopes below have been made steeper by the builders of the fort. The main enclosure, with three banks and ditches to the north, has an area of about 3 hectares (7.4 acres). Adjoining is a roughly triangular eastern enclosure with an area of about 1.8 hectares (4.4 acres), and an enclosure to the north of this with an area of about 0.7 hectares (1.7 acres). These two seem to be additions to the main enclosure.

The main entrance to the fort, on the west side, is defined by inturned banks. The south entrance is at the junction of the east and west enclosures. In the north there are two breaks in the banks.

In the northern enclosure there is a recumbent stone, perhaps dating from the Bronze Age. It is known, because of its shape, as the Frog Stone. There is no trace of a hollow where it might have once stood upright; it may have been placed here by the builders of the fort, or by earlier inhabitants.

== Tradition ==
According to Arthur Mee, Coxall Knoll was a site believed "by local tradition" and "with the support of instructed opinion" to be that of Caratacus' last stand against the Roman invaders.
