= Caer Caradoc (Chapel Lawn) =

Iron Age hillfort in Shropshire, England

Coordinates: 52.376045°N 3.014938°W

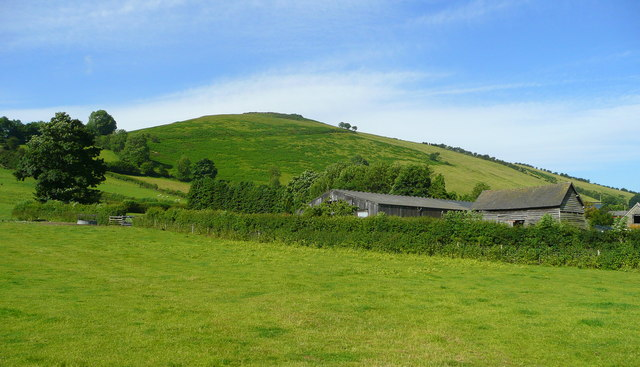
Looking towards Caer Caradoc hill fort from Chapel Lawn

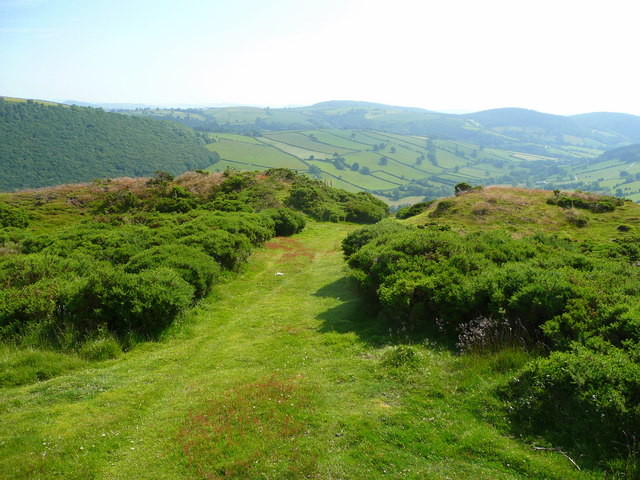
View east from Caer Caradoc hill fort

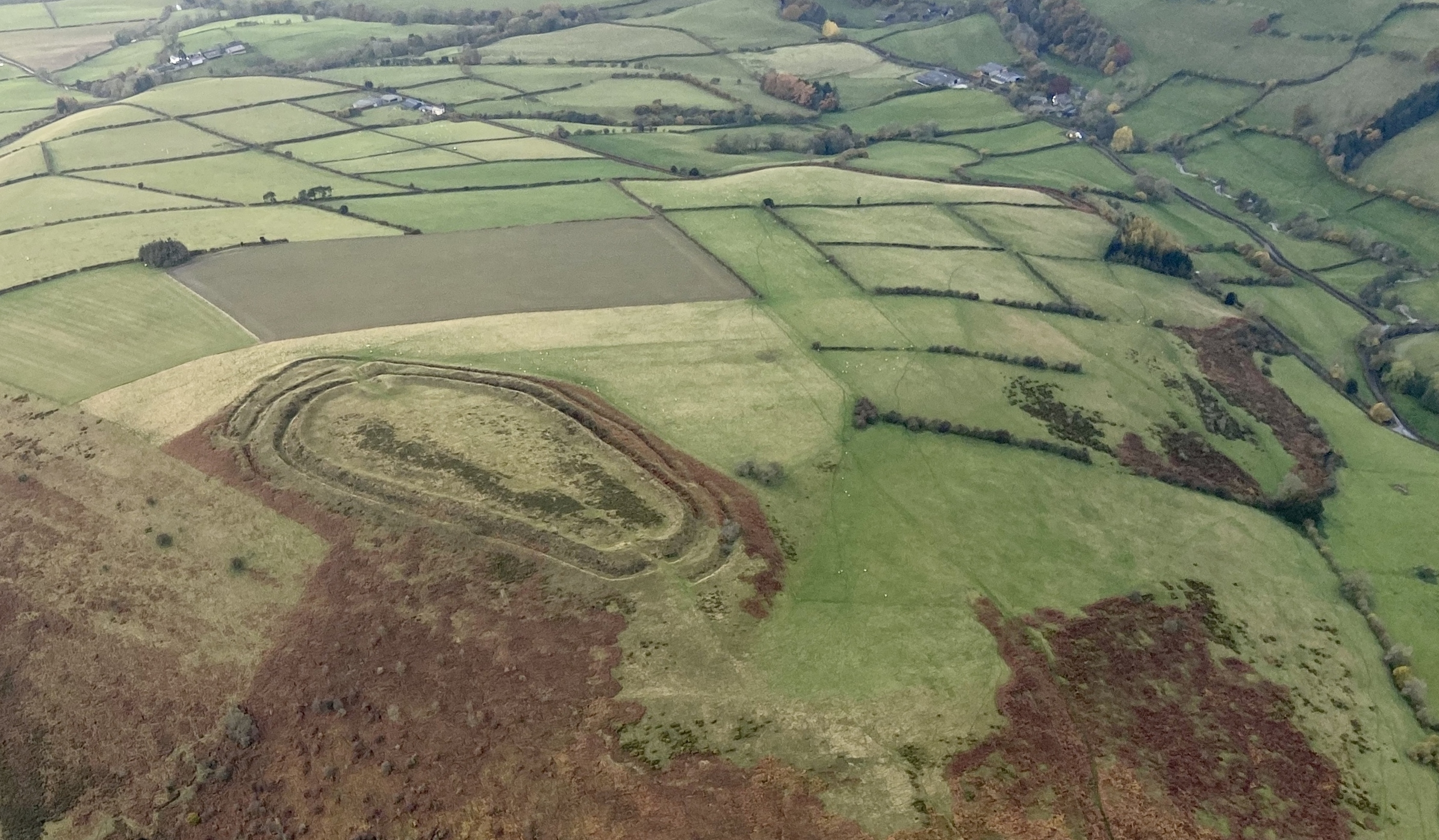
Aerial photo of Caer Caradoc

Caer Caradoc (Welsh – Caer Caradog) is an Iron Age hill fort and Scheduled Monument in the south-west of the English county of Shropshire, near the town of Clun. It overlooks the village of Chapel Lawn and lies within a loop of the River Redlake. It is located within an area of Open Access land and can be reached via a public footpath between the farms of Wax Hall to the west and Bryncambric to the east.

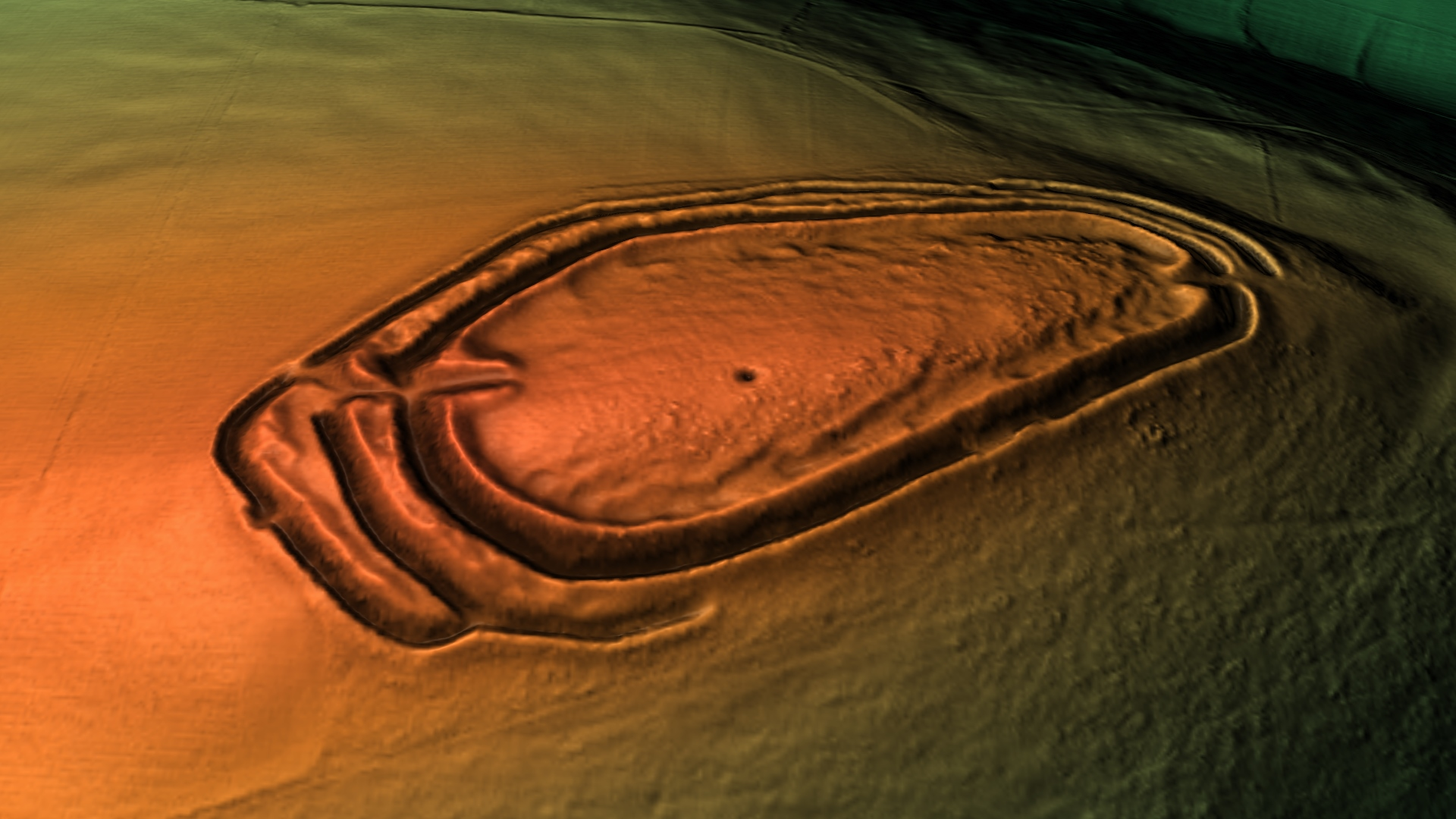
3D view of the digital terrain model

This hill fort has the same name as another, Caer Caradoc near Church Stretton, also in Shropshire but 16 miles (26 km) to the north-east. Like the latter, it has also been claimed to have been the site of Caratacus' last battle against the Roman occupation of Britain.
