= Bucknall-Estcourt =

Bucknall-Estcourt is a surname. Notable people with the surname include:

- James Bucknall Bucknall Estcourt (1803–1855), English major general and MP
- Thomas Bucknall-Estcourt (1801–1876), British politician

== See also ==
- Bucknall (disambiguation)#People named Bucknall
- Estcourt (surname)
- Frederick Estcourt Bucknall
