= Lower Todding =

Hamlet in Herefordshire, England

Coordinates: 52.37164°N 2.86950°W

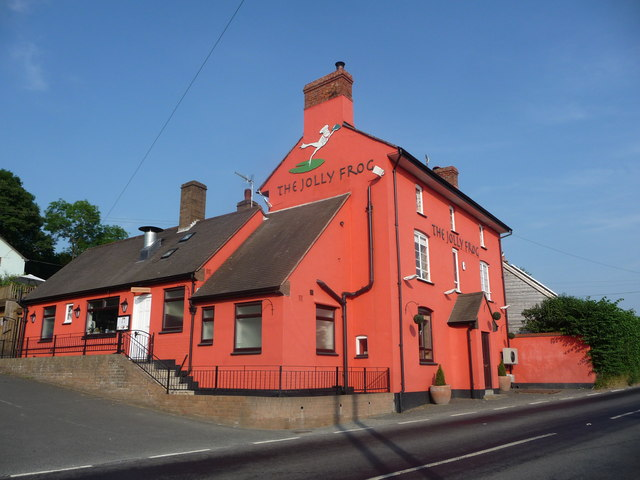
The Jolly Frog

Lower Todding is a hamlet in the English county of Herefordshire.

Lower Todding is located at the junction of the old carriage road and the A4113 road about half a mile north and east of Leintwardine. It is part of The Toddings.

The Jolly Frog fish restaurant (formerly a pub) is located at Lower Todding.
