= Heartsease, Knighton =

Coordinates: 52.3462°N 2.9904°W

Heartsease
- Location within Powys
- Population: <100
- OS grid reference: SO324724
- Principal area: Powys
- Preserved county: Powys
- Country: Wales
- Sovereign state: United Kingdom
- Post town: KNIGHTON
- Postcode district: LD7
- Dialling code: 01547
- Police: Dyfed-Powys
- Fire: Mid and West Wales
- Ambulance: Welsh
- UK Parliament: Brecon, Radnor and Cwm Tawe

Heartsease is a small settlement or hamlet in Powys, Wales. It is close to the border with England and lies near the junction of the two counties of Herefordshire and Shropshire.

Historically, it was part of the ancient cantref of Maelienydd in the Kingdom of Powys, and later the parish of Stanage. For historical population figures see Powys History Project. The hamlet lies on the A4113 road between Knighton and Ludlow and is a few hundred metres from the River Teme (Welsh: Afon Tefeidiad).

A romantic legend attributes the name to a comment made by Owain Glyndŵr whose heart was set at ease when he glimpsed Wales upon returning from England.

Heartsease Farm is the home of Radnor Hills, a business bottling local spring water.
