= Bucknall =

Bucknall could be:

== Places named Bucknall ==
- Bucknall, Lincolnshire
- Bucknall, Staffordshire, a suburb of Stoke-on-Trent

== People named Bucknall ==
- Benjamin Bucknall, (1833–1895) English architect of the Gothic Revival in England and Wales, and neo-Moorish architecture in Algeria.
- Frederick Estcourt Bucknall (1835 – 1896) was an English-born publican, brewer and politician in the colony of South Australia.
- Henry Bucknall (1885-1962), British rower.
- Gerard Bucknall (1894-1980), British World War II general.
- James Bucknall (b. 1958) British general and Deputy Commander ISAF
- Steve Bucknall (b. 1966), English basketball player.
- David Bucknall (1939-2015), British Quantity Surveyor
- James Bucknall Bucknall Estcourt, (1803-1855), was a major-general and MP.
- Thomas Bucknall-Estcourt, was a British Conservative politician.
- Thomas Grimston Bucknall Estcourt, English Politician.
- George Bucknall-Estcourt, English Politician.
- Roger Bucknall, luthier.
- Henry Bucknall Betterton, English Politician.
- Harry Bucknall (1965-), British writer best known for books In the Dolphin's Wake and Like a Tramp Like a Pilgrim.
- Anthony Launce Bucknall (1945-), a former England international rugby union player and captain.
- Cedric Bucknall, (1849-1921), English organist and botanist.
- Thomas Bucknall 18th century English shipbuilder for the Royal Navy
- Sir William Bucknall (1633-1676), English politician.
- William Bucknall, 1750–1814, English politician. Known before 1797 as William Grimston.
- Thomas Bucknall Lloyd, 1824 - 1896 was Archdeacon of Salop from 1886 until his death.

== See also ==
- Bucknell (disambiguation)
