= Walford, Letton and Newton =

Civil parish in Herefordshire, England

Coordinates: 52.34714°N 2.89984°W

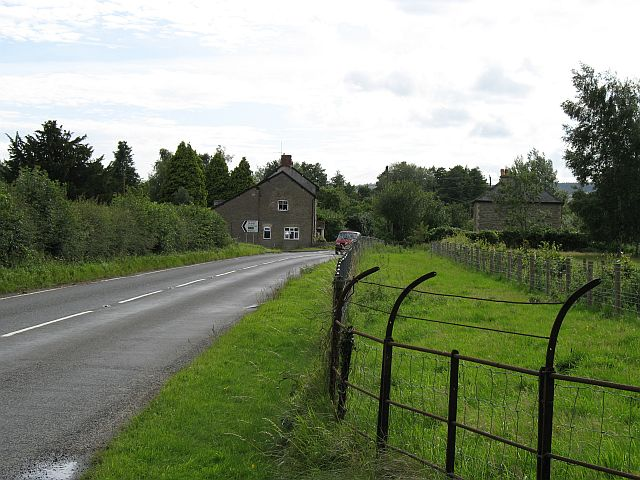
- Walford

- Location within Herefordshire
- Population: 179 (2011 census)
- Civil parish: Walford, Letton and Newton
- Unitary authority: County of Herefordshire
- Ceremonial county: Herefordshire
- Region: West Midlands
- Country: England
- Sovereign state: United Kingdom
- Police: West Mercia
- Fire: Hereford and Worcester
- Ambulance: West Midlands

Walford, Letton and Newton is a civil parish in north Herefordshire, England, and roughly 20 miles (30 km) north-northwest from the city and county town of Hereford, and 2 miles (3 km) east from the border with Wales.

Parish settlements are the village of Walford, at the north, and the hamlets of Letton and Newton further south. The post town is Craven Arms and post district, SY7. Parish population at the 2011 census was 179.

Walford village is 600 yards (500 m) south of the River Teme, and approximately 1 mile (1.6 km) southwest of Leintwardine. The A4113 Bromfield to Knighton road runs through the village. Mound remains of a motte-and-bailey are at the east of Walford (grid reference SO3913972413). Letton, 1.5 miles (2 km) south of Walford, comprises two farms and two residential properties. Newton comprises a group of farm buildings and a row of six cottages.

At the time of the Domesday Survey, Walford was known as 'Waliforde', which may mean 'ford of the Welshmen'.
