= Bucknell railway station =

Railway station in Shropshire, England

Bucknell
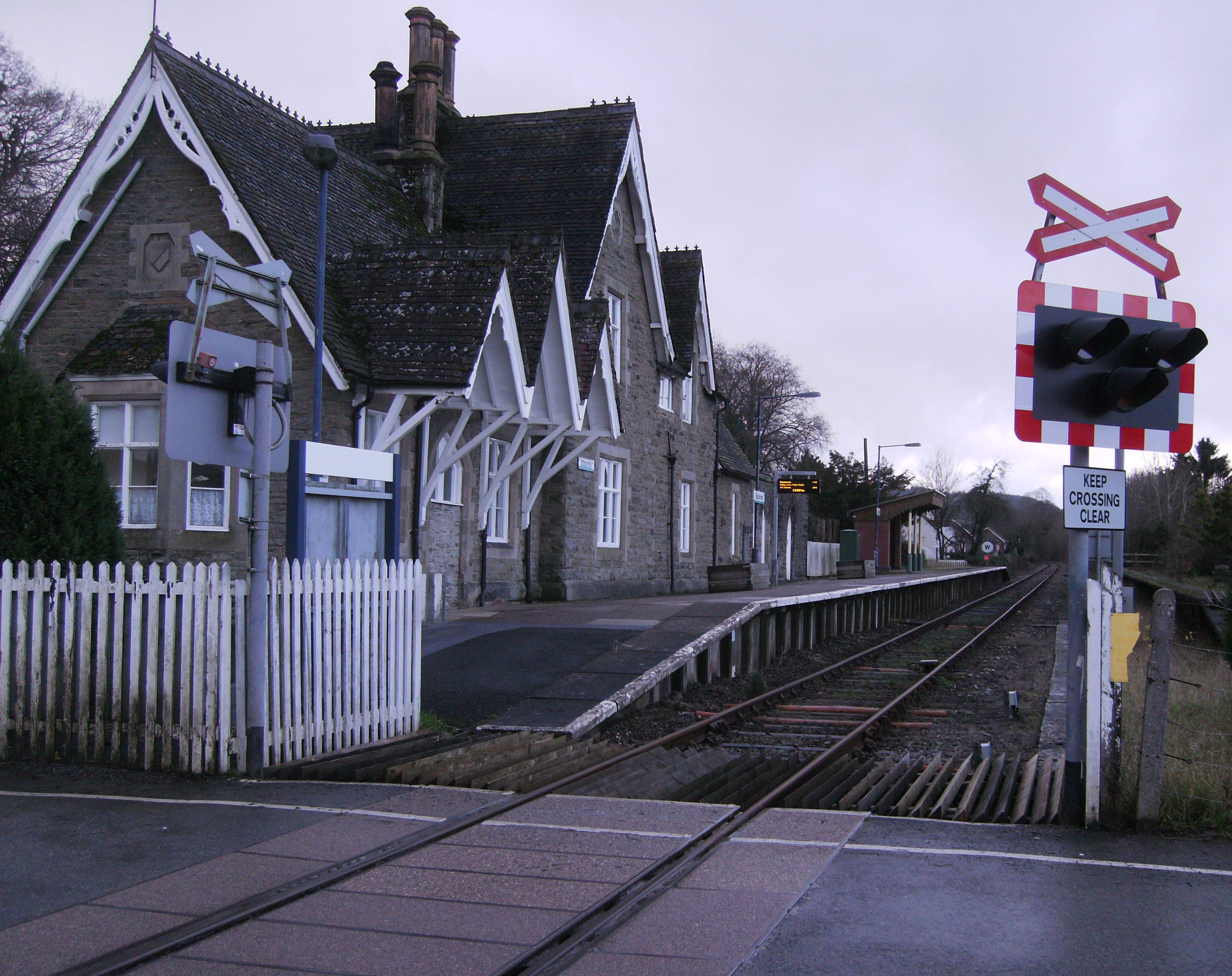

General information
- Location: Bucknell, Shropshire Council; England
- Coordinates: 52.3573°N 2.948°W
- Grid reference: SO355736
- Manager: Transport for Wales
- Platforms: 1

Other information
- Station code: BUK
- Classification: DfT category F2

History
- Opened: 1861

Passengers
- 2021/22: ▲2,132
- 2022/23: ▲3,044
- 2023/24: ▲3,264
- 2024/25: ▲3,858
- 2025/26: ▲7,726
Location
Notes
- Passenger statistics from the Office of Rail and Road

Bucknell railway station serves the village of Bucknell in Shropshire, England 28 1/4 miles (45.5 km) south west of Shrewsbury on the Heart of Wales Line.

This railway station is located at street level, adjacent to the level crossing and parallel with Weston Road near the centre of the village. All trains serving the station are operated by Transport for Wales.

The station has two platforms, although currently only the one adjacent to the original station building (now a private house and holiday cottage, which has been Grade-II listed since 1987) is operational, the other track having been taken out of use in 1965 and subsequently dismantled.

== History ==
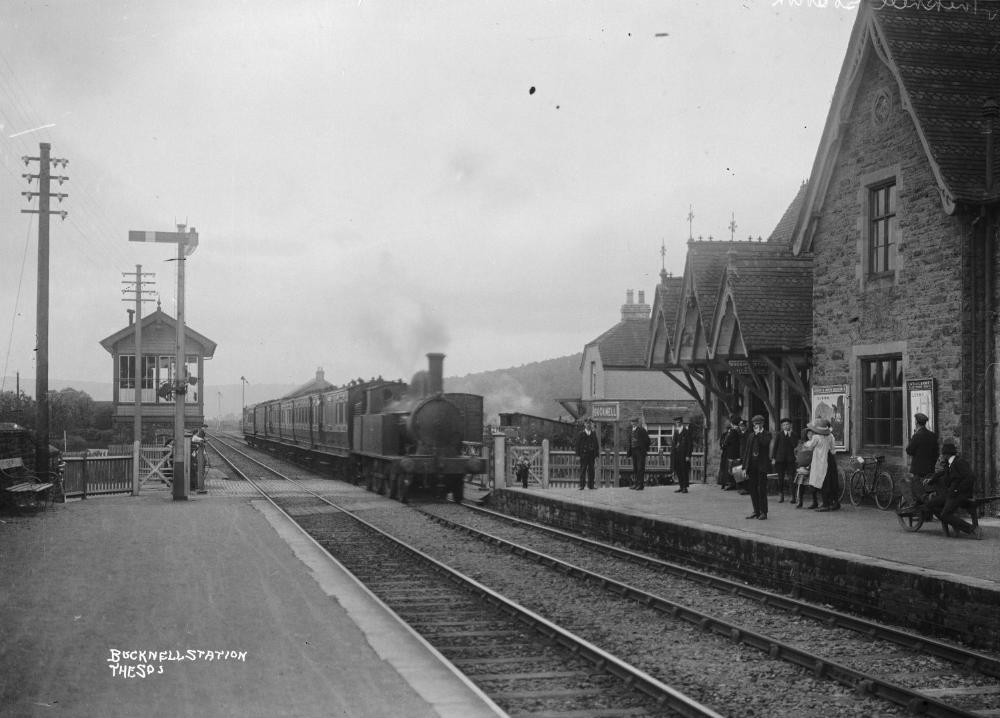
Bucknell station c.1910

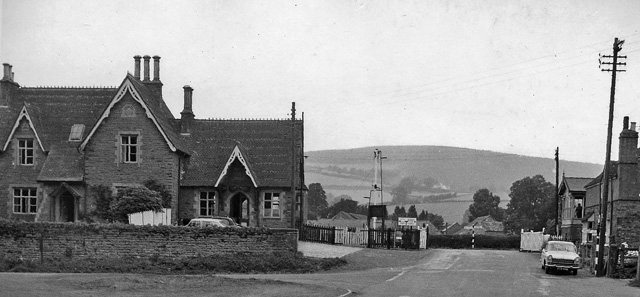
The station in 1963

The station and line was constructed by the Knighton Railway and opened in 1861. Further construction and route openings in 1865 and 1868 subsequently put the station on a through route between Shrewsbury and Swansea.

Bucknell station quickly became the rail outlet for a wide area, stimulating a growth in the village itself.

== Facilities ==
The station is unstaffed and has the same range of amenities as others on the route i.e. CIS display screen, customer help point, waiting shelter and timetable information board.

== Services ==
There are five passenger trains a day southbound and six northbound (five on Saturdays), running between Shrewsbury and Swansea from Monday to Saturday, and two services on Sundays. As of October 2025, trains serving the station are operated by Transport for Wales.

The station is a request stop for trains running from Shrewsbury to Swansea. Those wishing to alight or board the train here must alert the driver/conductor of the train. However, passenger trains running from Swansea to Shrewsbury stop here mandatorily, as the train has to stop before the level crossing. For trains from the Swansea direction, the level crossing is activated by the train crew using a cabinet on the platform. From 1977 to 2014, the level crossing was ungated, but following several near-misses (such as 12 recorded incidents in 2011), half-barriers were installed in spring 2014, and fully commissioned on 28/29 April 2014.

Preceding station	National Rail	Following station
Knighton	Transport for Wales; Heart of Wales Line	Hopton Heath

=== Bus service ===
Local bus services (the Minsterley Motors 738 & 740) call at the station, which travel between Ludlow and Knighton and call at the nearby villages of Bedstone, Brampton Bryan and Leintwardine. Currently 4 buses per day (in each direction) call at Bucknell.

== See also ==
- Railways of Shropshire
- Listed buildings in Bucknell, Shropshire
