= Sun Inn =

Listed pub in Herefordshire, England

- The pub in 2014

General information
- Type: Parlour pub; originally two cottages
- Location: Rosemary Lane, Leintwardine, Herefordshire, England
- Coordinates: 52.3594°N 2.8735°W
- Year built: Late 18th or early 19th century
- Owner: Independent

Design and construction
- Designations

Listed Building – Grade II
- Official name: The Sun Inn
- Designated: 16 January 2008
- Reference no.: 1392362

The Sun Inn is a Grade II listed parlour pub on Rosemary Lane in Leintwardine, a village in Herefordshire, England. Dating from the late 18th or early 19th century, it is regarded as one of the United Kingdom's last remaining parlour pubs and retains a notably well-preserved historic interior. The pub is included on the Campaign for Real Ale (CAMRA)'s National Inventory of Historic Pub Interiors, where it is rated three stars and classified as being of "outstanding national historic importance".

== History ==
The building comprises a public house and adjoining house, dating from the late 18th or early 19th century and thought originally to have been a pair of cottages. Trade directories show that the Sun Inn had become a licensed pub by 1871, having not been recorded as such in 1861, and it has remained in continuous use in that capacity ever since.

It was included on the Campaign for Real Ale (CAMRA)'s National Inventory of Historic Pub Interiors before the inventory's grading system was revised. Under the revised scheme, it is rated three stars and its interior is regarded as being "of outstanding national historic importance". On 16 January 2008, the Sun Inn was designated a Grade II listed building.

The Sun Inn, described as one of the United Kingdom's last remaining parlour pubs, had been owned and operated by resident Flossie Lane, who was born at the pub in 1914 and took over its ownership more than 70 years before her death in June 2009 at the age of 94. Following her death, concerns were raised that the pub might be sold for redevelopment. With support from CAMRA and the Save the Sun Inn campaign, the pub was subsequently purchased from Lane's nieces, who wished it to remain a public house, by a local resident who had known Lane and a local brewery owner. CAMRA later installed a blue plaque in memory of Lane. The pub retains its two original front rooms, comprising a public room and a parlour. A modern pavilion-style extension has been added to the rear, overlooking the garden.

== Architecture ==
=== Exterior ===
The building is constructed of coursed stone rubble with a Welsh slate roof and brick chimneys. The western gable wall and the rear extensions are built of brick. The main range has two storeys and a single-room depth, with a series of single-storey extensions across the rear.

The front elevation has four irregularly spaced bays and two entrances, although only the eastern doorway remains in use. Both doorways have modern porches. The windows are fitted with stone sills and lintels, with sash windows surviving on much of the building and later casement windows in some openings. The eastern gable end contains a further sash window.

At the rear are a series of brick extensions housing former urinals and a kitchen. Two small first-floor windows overlook the rear, one of which retains leaded glazing. The pub sign is mounted on a post beside the building and bears the name "Sun Inn".

=== Interior ===
The interior is arranged around a central entrance hall, with a public bar on one side and a parlour on the other. The public room, known as the "Red Brick Bar", is relatively plainly furnished, with a brick fireplace dating from the late 19th century, a red-tiled floor, simple wooden seating and a timber screen beneath the window. It retains scrubbed wooden tables and bench seating characteristic of its traditional public-bar function. The entrance hall retains timber wall lining used as bench backs.

The parlour contains wooden panelling, a fireplace with its original mantelpiece and cupboards, and a replacement mid-20th-century grate. Formerly used as the living room of the long-serving landlady, it retains a notably domestic character. Behind it is the kitchen, which also serves as the cellar and servery, with beer stored beneath the stairs and shelving for glassware. Traditionally, drinks were served from this area rather than from a conventional bar counter. The kitchen and adjoining rear room both retain stone-flag floors, while the rear room contains late 19th-century joinery and fitted cupboards. The upper floor is reached by simple wooden staircases from both the kitchen and the entrance hall. A rear extension completed in 2011 added a new bar area while leaving the historic front rooms largely unchanged.
