= Listed buildings in Bucknell, Shropshire =

Bucknell is a civil parish in Shropshire, England. The parish contains 30 listed buildings that are recorded in the National Heritage List for England. All the listed buildings are designated at Grade II, the lowest of the three grades, which is applied to "buildings of national importance and special interest". The parish contains the village of Bucknell and the surrounding countryside. Most of the listed buildings are in the village, and a high number of them are basically timber framed and date from the 14th to 17th centuries; these include houses, cottages, farmhouses and farm buildings. The other listed buildings are a church, an ice house, a railway station and a telephone kiosk.

== Buildings ==
Name and location	Photograph	Date	Notes
St Mary's Church; 52.35920°N 2.94903°W		12th century	The church was altered and extended during the following centuries, particularly in 1868–70 by Thomas Nicholson, who added a porch, the north aisle, the vestry, and the bell turret. The church is built in limestone and has a slate roof with ornamental ceramic cresting and iron crosses. It consists of a nave, a north aisle, and a chancel with a northeast vestry and organ chamber. At the west end is a bell turret in oak shingle with a south clock face, surmounted by a slated spire with a brass weathercock.
Lower House; 52.36058°N 2.94875°W		14th or 15th century	The farmhouse, later a private house, was considerably altered in the 19th and 20th centuries. It has a timber framed core, subsequently encased, with limestone to the right and red brick to the left. The roof is slated, there are two storeys, and the windows are 20th-century casements. Above the door is a rectangular fanlight. Inside is a full cruck truss, and an infilled inglenook fireplace.
The Willows; 52.35971°N 2.94971°W		14th or 15th century	The house, which later incorporated a post office, has been altered and extended, and was remodelled in about 1920. It has a cruck construction, and is in timber framing and brick and is roughcast. The extension is in rendered brick, and it all has a slate roof. In the gable end facing the road is a shop front, and the windows are casements. Inside there are two full cruck trusses.
New House; 52.36082°N 2.95242°W		16th century (probable)	A farmhouse that was later extended, particularly in the 19th century, and divided into two dwellings. The original part is timber framed, the later part is in limestone, it is mainly roughcast, and the roof is in slate and stone-slate. The house has two storeys and an irregular plan. The original part has basically an H-shaped plan, with a central range, and two projecting gabled wings. The central range is also gabled, and contains a doorway with a pediment on consoles. The 19th-century extension to the right has a doorway with a semicircular fanlight and a hood on brackets. There are gabled extensions at the rear. The windows are a mix of casements and sashes.
Upper House; 52.36098°N 2.95170°W	—	Mid- to late 16th century	The farmhouse was extended to the right in the early 19th century. Both parts have two storeys, and the roof is slated and hipped to the right. The original part is timber framed and mainly rendered or roughcast. It has two or three bays, the upper storey is jettied, and the windows are casements. The extension is in limestone, and has two bays and sash windows.
The Bytack and barn 52.36755°N 2.94994°W	—	Late 16th or early 17th century	The farmhouse and attached barn are timber framed on a stone plinth. The farmhouse has plastered wattle and daub infill, an extension in limestone, and a slate roof. There is one storey and an attic, the windows are casements, and there are two gabled dormers. The barn is weatherboarded, and has a corrugated iron roof.
Bucknell Cottage; 52.35891°N 2.94942°W		Early 17th century (probable)	A farmhouse that was extended to form three cottages, and then converted into a single dwelling. The original part is timber framed, the extensions are in brick and limestone, mostly rendered, and the roofs are tiled. There is one storey and attics, and the windows are casements. The main range has three doorways and five gabled dormers, and at the right end is a range dating from about 1910, which is gabled and projects at the front and the rear.
Old School House and outbuilding 52.35924°N 2.94741°W		Early 17th century	A farmhouse, later a school and shop, and then two cottages, it is timber framed with brick infill, partly rendered, and partly roughcast and partly weatherboarded, with slate roofs. There are two storeys, a long main range, and at the south end is a single-bay cross-wing to the east. In the main range are casement windows and a large gabled dormer. Facing the road are two gables and a central doorway flanked by bay windows. At the north end is an attached outbuilding, which is timber framed and weatherboarded with a corrugated iron roof.
The Old Farmhouse; 52.36004°N 2.94755°W		Early 17th century	The farmhouse incorporates earlier material. It is mainly timber framed with some limestone and slate roofs. The farmhouse has an L-shaped plan, with a main range, and a stone dairy at right angles at the north end. There is one storey and attics, and a two-storey gable in the centre of the main range. The windows are casements, and there is a gable dormer. Inside is an inglenook fireplace.
Weir Cottage; 52.36030°N 2.94925°W		Early 17th century	A timber framed cottage with rendered infill on a stone plinth with a thatched roof. There is one storey and attics, and three bays. On the front is a gabled porch, and the windows are casements. On the front are two eyebrow eaves dormers, and at the rear is a full gabled dormer.
Yew Tree Cottage; 52.35879°N 2.94595°W		Early 17th century	The cottage is timber framed with rendered infill on a stone plinth, and has a slate roof. There are two storeys and two bays. On the front is a gabled porch, and the windows are casements.
Church Cottage; 52.35883°N 2.94857°W		17th century (probable)	The cottage was later extended. The original part is timber framed, the extension is in brick, it is on a plinth and rendered, and has a slate roof. There is one storey and an attic, and three bays. The doorway has a semicircular hood, the windows are casements, one with a segmental head, and there is a gabled eaves dormer.
Lower Lye Farmhouse; 52.37480°N 2.98052°W		Mid-17th century	The farmhouse was extended later in the 17th century. It is in limestone and has a corrugated iron roof. There is one storey and an attic, and three bays. The windows are casements, and there are two raking eaves dormers. At the right end is a corrugated iron lean-to, and inside there are timber framed walls.
Barn near Old School House; 52.35915°N 2.94717°W		Mid-17th century	The barn is timber framed on a stone plinth, and is partly weatherboarded and partly clad in corrugated iron. The roof is in corrugated iron. The barn contains four doors, five eaves hatches, and a dormer.
The Desert; 52.36035°N 2.95139°W	—	17th century	A timber framed cottage, roughcast, and with a cedar shingle roof. It has one storey and an attic, and four bays. There is a gabled porch, one fixed window, casement windows, and three gabled dormers.
Weir House; 52.36037°N 2.94972°W		17th century (probable)	The oldest part is the right rear wing, the main block being added at right angles in the early 19th century. The house is in pebbledashed limestone, the roof of the earlier part is tiled, and the later part is slated. The older part has one storey and an attic, casement windows and two gabled dormers. The later part has two storeys and attics, three bays, and a lower wing to the left. The windows are sashes, and in the attic are two flat-roofed dormers. On the front is a round-arched porch that has fluted Doric columns, and above the door is a fanlight.
Barn southwest of Fold Cottage; 52.36092°N 2.95100°W		Mid- to late 17th century	The barn is timber framed and weatherboarded on a limestone plinth and has a corrugated iron roof. There are two doors and four eaves hatches.
Woodside Farmhouse; 52.37009°N 2.97295°W	—	Mid- to late 17th century	The original part is timber framed with rendered infill on a stone plinth, it was extended in the 20th century in red brick, and has a slate roof. The farmhouse has one storey and an attic, the original part has two bays, and the extension is a full-length rear lean-to.
Barn, Lower House; 52.36048°N 2.94896°W		Late 17th century	The barn is timber framed and weatherboarded on a stone plinth, and it has a slate roof. There are two raking eaves dormers.
Barn, cart entrance and loose box, The Old Farm; 52.36019°N 2.94816°W		Late 17th century	The farm buildings are timber framed and weatherboarded on a limestone plinth, and with a corrugated iron roof, hipped to the north. At the north end of the barn at right angles is a two-bay loose box, and to the south, beyond the cart entrance is a five-bay former threshing barn. The barn contains five square pitching holes and a central doorway.
Barn south of The Willows; 52.35954°N 2.94949°W	—	Late 17th century	The barn is timber framed and weatherboarded on a limestone plinth, and with a corrugated iron roof. There are three central doors, and double doors outside these.
Barn, Woodside Farm; 52.37031°N 2.97304°W	—	Late 17th century	The barn is timber framed, weatherboarded and clad in corrugated iron, on a stone plinth, and it has a corrugated iron roof. There are scattered doorways and window openings.
Matthews memorial 52.35901°N 2.94892°W	—	c. 1771	The memorial is in the churchyard of St Mary's Church, and is to the memory of members of the Matthews family. It is a pedestal tomb in limestone, and has a moulded plinth and capping, and is surmounted by a fluted urn-shaped finial.
Turkey Hall; 52.36063°N 2.95412°W		c. 1800	A farmhouse that was extended, and later a private house. It is in limestone, with the front in red brick, and a hipped slate roof. It has two storeys, a dentilled eaves cornice, the original part has three bays, and there is a one bay extension to the left. The round-headed doorway has a fanlight, and the windows are sashes.
Bucknell House; 52.35544°N 2.94845°W	—	Early 19th century	A vicarage, later a private house, in red brick with hipped slate roofs. There are two storeys, a main range of three bays, a three-bay range projecting on the right, and a recessed one-bay range to the left. There is a Doric porch with triglyphs and metopes in the entablature. Most of the windows are sashes, those in the ground floor in segmental-arched recesses.
Fold Cottage; 52.36106°N 2.95082°W		Early 19th century	A limestone farmhouse with a tile roof, two storeys and two bays. The windows are casements; the ground floor windows and the doorway have segmental heads.
The Hall; 52.35874°N 2.94744°W		Early 19th century	A red brick house with a dentilled eaves cornice and a hipped slate roof. It has an L-shaped plan, two storeys, and a front of three bays. The central round-headed doorway has a fanlight, and the windows are sashes.
Ice house, The Old Farm; 52.35991°N 2.94743°W	—	Early 19th century (probable)	The ice house is in limestone. There is a segmental-headed entrance to the tunnel, which is blocked at the far end, and the structure is covered in earth.
Bucknell railway station 52.35730°N 2.94730°W		1860–61	The station was built for the Knighton Railway, later part of the Heart of Wales line, and is in limestone with tile roofs. The single-storey part to the left has three gables, the taller two-storey central section has a projecting gabled bay and two bays to the right with a smaller gable, and there is a single-storey wing to the right. The left gable end has a canted bay window, and all the other windows are mullioned and transomed. The gables have elaborately cusped bargeboards.
Telephone kiosk 52.36052°N 2.94931°W		1935	A K6 type telephone kiosk, designed by Giles Gilbert Scott. Constructed in cast iron with a square plan and a dome, it has three unperforated crowns in the top panels.
