= Buckton and Coxall =

Civil parish in north Herefordshire, England

Coordinates: 52.36°N 2.91°W

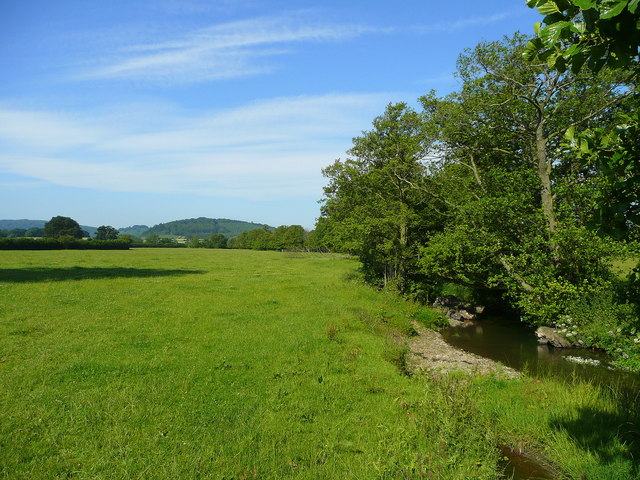
Adley Moor Common with Coxall Knoll in the distance. The River Redlake is to the right.

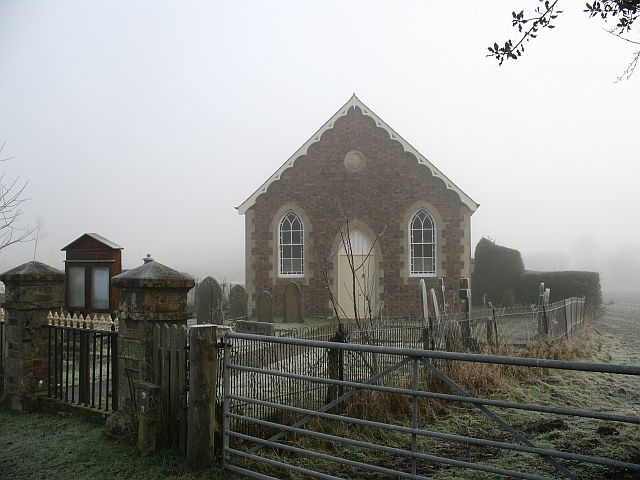
Coxall Baptist Chapel, which is situated near the village of Bedstone.

Buckton and Coxall is a civil parish in north Herefordshire, England.

Buckton and Coxall are hamlets in the parish. Coxall has a Baptist chapel situated on the B4367 road, where there is a Royal Mail post box too. The chapel and post box are on the other side of the Heart of Wales Line from the main part of the hamlet, and in the county of Shropshire. Buckton is a larger hamlet and has a bridge (Buckton Bridge) over the River Teme. There was a Roman fort at Buckton.

Adley Moor (or Adleymoor) is another small hamlet in the parish and lies between Coxall and Jay (a small hamlet in neighbouring Leintwardine civil parish). Between Adley Moor and Jay is a small piece of common land (Adley Moor/Adleymoor Common). The River Redlake flows through the parish, passing Coxall and Adley Moor, before joining the River Clun at Jay.

The Herefordshire Trail long distance footpath passes through the southern part of the parish, on its way between the nearby Herefordshire villages of Brampton Bryan and Leintwardine.

Coxall Knoll is a notable wooded hill in the vicinity, with an Iron Age hill fort atop. It straddles the Shropshire-Herefordshire border, with the fort and peak being on the Shropshire side.

According to the 2001 census the parish had a population of 102. The parish borders with Shropshire and Wales. The Salopian village of Bucknell is about one mile (1.6 km) to the west, on the other side of the Knoll.

== History ==
In January 1639 Brilliana Harley wrote that Robert Mathey had found a religious painting concealed under a plank in his stable at Buckton. Her father Edward Conway, 1st Viscount Conway broke it up as idolatrous.
