= Obley =

Coordinates: 52.394°N 2.986°W

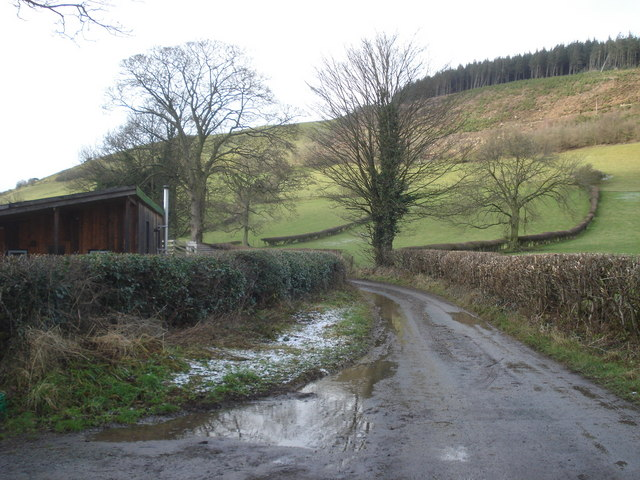
- Ecocabin at Obley

- Location within Shropshire
- OS grid reference: SO329778
- Civil parish: Clunbury
- Unitary authority: Shropshire
- Ceremonial county: Shropshire
- Region: West Midlands
- Country: England
- Sovereign state: United Kingdom
- Post town: BUCKNELL
- Postcode district: SY7
- Dialling code: 01588
- Police: West Mercia
- Fire: Shropshire
- Ambulance: West Midlands
- UK Parliament: Ludlow

Obley is a small dispersed village in Shropshire, England. It is located a mile northeast of the village of Chapel Lawn and two miles west of Hopton Castle.

The nearest towns are Clun within England and Knighton, Powys (in Wales) with the population at the 2011 census being listed under Clunbury. The village lies at 269m above sea level.

The village lies in very rural, hilly countryside. Black Hill (441m) lies to the north.
