= Listed buildings in Stowe, Shropshire =

Stowe is a civil parish in Shropshire, England. It contains seven listed buildings that are recorded in the National Heritage List for England. Of these, one is listed at Grade II*, the middle of the three grades, and the others are at Grade II, the lowest grade. The parish contains the village of Stowe and smaller settlements, and is otherwise rural. The most important listed building is a church in Stowe village. Near the southern border of the parish are a listed railway station and a telephone kiosk, and the other listed buildings are farmhouses and farm buildings.

== Key ==
Grade	Criteria
II*	Particularly important buildings of more than special interest
II	Buildings of national importance and special interest

== Buildings ==
Name and location	Photograph	Date	Notes	Grade
St Michael's Church; 52.35701°N 3.01448°W		13th century (probable)	The bellcote was added in the late 17th century, and the chancel was rebuilt when the church was restored in the late 19th century. The church is built in limestone and has tile roofs with ornamental cresting. It consists of a nave, a south porch, a chancel and a north vestry. The bellcote at the west end is weatherboarded and has a pyramidal slate top. Set into the wall to the right of the porch is an armorial shield.	II*
Little Weston Farmhouse; 52.35498°N 2.98606°W	—	Early to mid 17th century	The farmhouse was altered in the 19th century. It is timber framed with painted brick infill, rendered at the front and right gable end, on a roughcast plinth, and with a slate roof. There are two storeys and three bays. The doorway has a segmental head, and the windows are casements.	II
Weston Farmhouse; 52.35445°N 2.98691°W	—	Mid 17th century	The farmhouse was extended in the 19th century and subsequently altered. It is in limestone with some brick and has slate roofs. There are two storeys and an attic, and an L-shaped plan, consisting of a main range and a rear wing on the left. The doorway has a segmental head, the windows are casements, and there is a flat-roofed dormer.	II
Cowhouse, Stowe Farm; 52.35529°N 3.01322°W	—	Late 17th century (probable)	The cowhouse is in limestone with weatherboarding on the south side, and it has a corrugated iron roof. There are two levels and four bays. The cowhouse contains four doors and an eaves hatch.	II
Barn, Weston Farm; 52.35431°N 2.98656°W	—	Late 17th century	A threshing machine was added in about 1921. The barn is timber framed on a stone plinth and clad in corrugated iron, with weatherboarding on the north gable end, and a corrugated iron roof. There are two levels and seven bays, three doorways and two eaves dormers. At the rear is a threshing entrance with the remains of the threshing machine.	II
Knighton railway station 52.34493°N 3.04247°W		1861–62	The railway station was built for the London and North Western Railway. The building is in limestone, the roofs are tiled with ornamental cresting, and it is Gothic style. It originally consisted of a stationmaster's house with two storeys and a single-storey booking hall, and its functions have since been altered. The entrance front is irregular, and includes gables with ornamental bargeboards, and at the east end is a pavilion with a truncated pyramidal roof. The windows vary, and include mullion and transomed windows, lancets and inserted casement windows.	II
K6 Telephone kiosk 52.34530°N 3.04304°W		1935	A K6 type telephone kiosk, designed by Giles Gilbert Scott. Constructed in cast iron with a square plan and a dome, it has three unperforated crowns in the top panels.	II
