= Bucknell Wood Meadows =

Site in Northamptonshire, England

Coordinates: 52.099°N 1.065°W

- Site of Special Scientific Interest
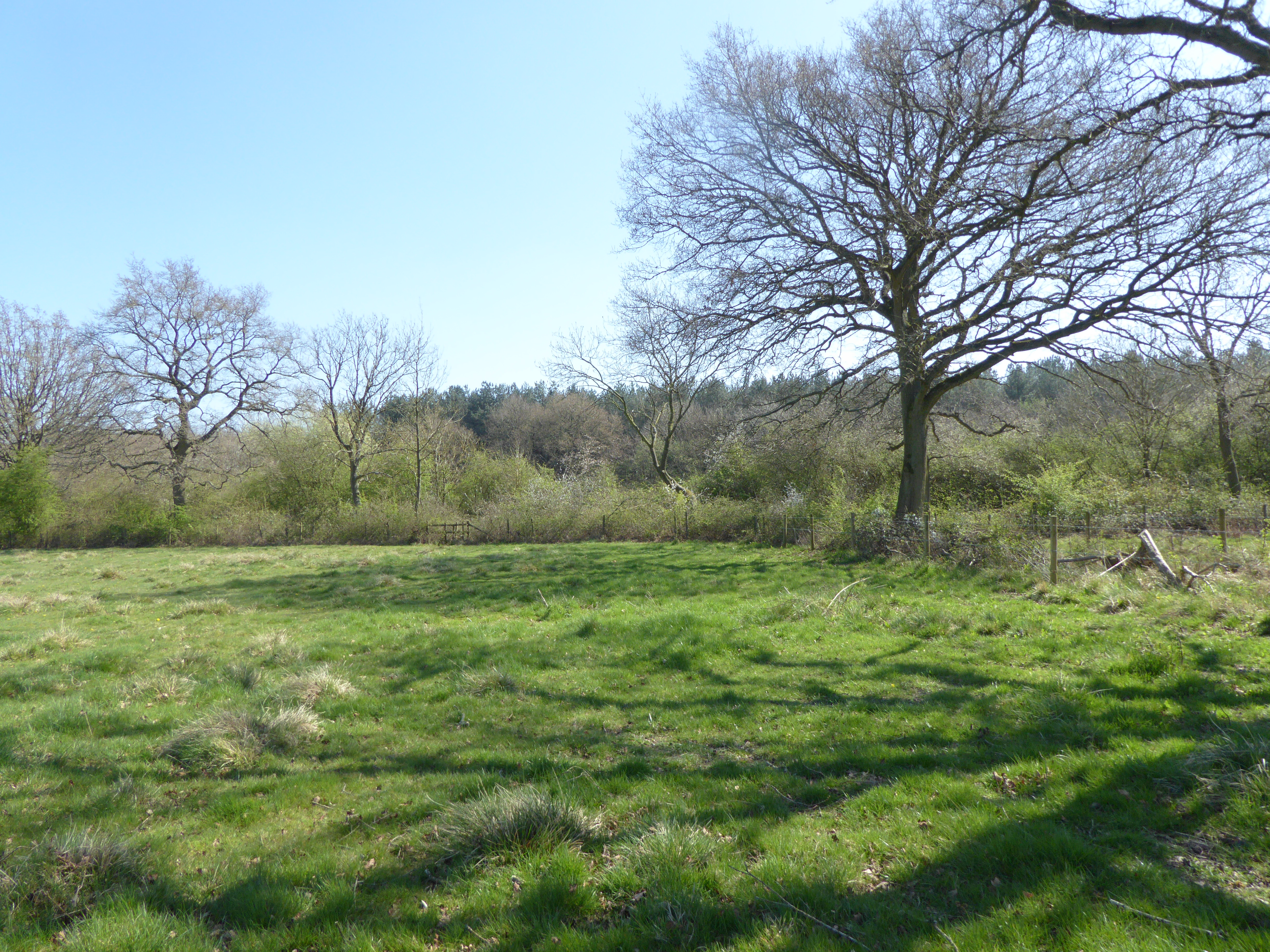
- Location of Bucknell Wood Meadows.
- Area of search: Northamptonshire
- Grid reference: SP 641 449
- Interest: Biological
- Area: 9.2 hectares
- Notification date: 1989
- Location map: Magic Map

Bucknell Wood Meadows is a 9.2-hectare (23-acre) biological Site of Special Scientific Interest north-west of Silverstone in Northamptonshire.

This site consists of agriculturally unimproved fields on seasonally waterlogged soils. The flora is diverse with many herbs, including bird's-foot-trefoil, meadow buttercup and devil's-bit scabious. Variations in the types of flora are partly due to different soils and partly to previous management practices.

There is access from public footpaths which pass through the site.
