= Milebrook =

Hamlet in Powys, Wales

Coordinates: 52.3479°N 3.0092°W

Milebrook is a hamlet in Powys, Wales.

== Location ==
Milebrook is located on a crossroads of the A4113 road almost alongside the Afon Tefeidiad that, thereabouts, forms the border with England. The nearest town is Knighton a mile or so to its west.
