= John Bucknell =

English cricketer

Jack Bucknell
Personal information
- Full name: John Bucknell
- Born: 7 June 1872; Bedminster, Bristol, England
- Died: 5 March 1925 (aged 52); Darlington, Co Durham, England
- Batting: Right-handed
- Bowling: Right-arm medium-pace, leg-break
- Role: Bowler

Domestic team information
- Years: Team
- 1895–1905: Somerset
- First-class debut: 13 May 1895 Somerset v Cambridge University
- Last First-class: 7 July 1905 Somerset v Yorkshire

Career statistics
| Competition | First-class |
|---|---|
| Matches | 10 |
| Runs scored | 144 |
| Batting average | 12.00 |
| 100s/50s | –/– |
| Top score | 33 |
| Balls bowled | 943 |
| Wickets | 10 |
| Bowling average | 61.70 |
| 5 wickets in innings | – |
| 10 wickets in match | – |
| Best bowling | 3/93 |
| Catches/stumpings | 3/– |
- Source: CricketArchive, 27 February 2011

John Bucknell, known as Jack Bucknell, (7 June 1872 – 5 March 1925) was an English cricket player who played first-class cricket for Somerset between 1895 and 1905. He was born at Bedminster, Bristol and died at Darlington, Co Durham.

Bucknell was a right-handed lower-order batsman and a right-arm medium pace or leg-break bowler. His first-class cricket career was spasmodic, with three matches in each of the 1895, 1899 and 1905 seasons and a single game in 1904. His best bowling and batting performances were both achieved in his first season, 1895. In his first game, against Cambridge University, he took three Cambridge wickets for 93 runs. Then a week later, in the match against Oxford University he made 33, batting at No 10.

His brother Arthur played Minor Counties cricket for Durham.
