= A4113 road =

Road in Eastern Wales, Herefordshire and Shropshire

Coordinates: 52.35317°N 2.88666°W

A4113

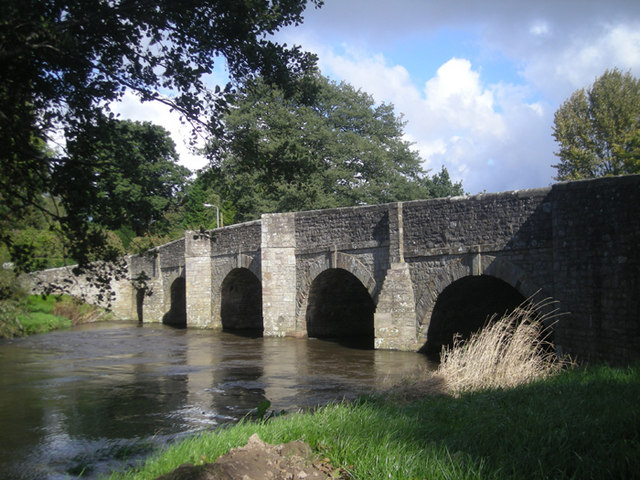
- The A4113 crosses the River Teme at Leintwardine Bridge

Route information
- Length: 14.0 mi (22.5 km)

Major junctions
- West end: Knighton
- A488 A4110; A49
- East end: Bromfield

Location
- Country: United Kingdom
- Primary destinations: none

Road network
- Roads in the United Kingdom; Motorways; A and B road zones

The A4113 road is a single-carriageway road that runs from Knighton in Powys to Bromfield in Shropshire, United Kingdom, passing through north Herefordshire.

From Knighton (and the A488) it heads east along the southern side of the Teme valley (heading downstream), crossing the England–Wales border into Herefordshire, then across the River Teme via Leintwardine Bridge (at 119 metres (390 ft) above sea level). The route then follows a Roman Road north through the Roman village of Leintwardine, leaving the Teme behind.

From Leintwardine the route heads rapidly up into the Leintwardine hills, passing at 242 metres (794 ft) above sea level, before descending into Shropshire and terminating at Bromfield (A49), 2 miles (3.2 km) northwest of Ludlow, at an elevation of 91 metres (299 ft) and also returning close to the River Teme. In total the A4113 is 14.0 miles (22.5 km) in length.

== Route (west to east) ==
- Knighton – junction with A488 road
- Milebrook
- Heartsease
- Wales (Powys) – England (Herefordshire) border
- Brampton Bryan
- Walford
- junction with the A4110 road
- Leintwardine
- Lower Todding
- Highest elevation: 242 metres (794 ft) (at Mocktree)
- Fiddler's Elbow (hairpin bend)
- Herefordshire – Shropshire border
- Bromfield – junction with the A49 trunk road
