= River Redlake =

River in southwest Shropshire, England

Coordinates: 52.382°N 3.012°W

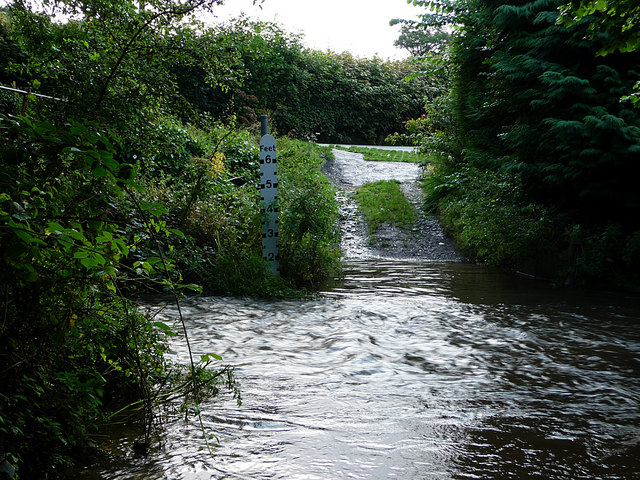
River Redlake at Bucknell ford

The Redlake is a minor river in southwest Shropshire, England.

Its headwaters are to the south of Newcastle, on the other side of Spoad Hill (alternatively Springhill).

It flows through Treverward, Purlogue, New Invention, Chapel Lawn, Bucknell and Coxall, before discharging into the River Clun at Jay. The last part of the river, through Adley Moor, is in Herefordshire.

The Redlake River has had different names in different places at different times. The upper reaches through Treverward and Purlogue were known as the Bradfeld or Bardfield Flud up until the early 19th century. In the 17th century, and maybe before, the middle section was called Chapel Brook after the medieval chapel that was built there in 1513. From Saxon times until the end of the 18th century, the lower reaches and maybe higher, were known as the Adlake, Adlagh and Elagh, plus many variations in spelling, so called because of a Saxon Manor called Adelactune further downstream at Bucknell. It is thought that the 'R' came from either ‘yr’ which is Welsh for ‘the’ or from ‘atter’, which is Middle English for ‘at the’. A longer explanation can be found on the Redlake Valley Artist's webpage.
