= Harry Bucknall =

British writer

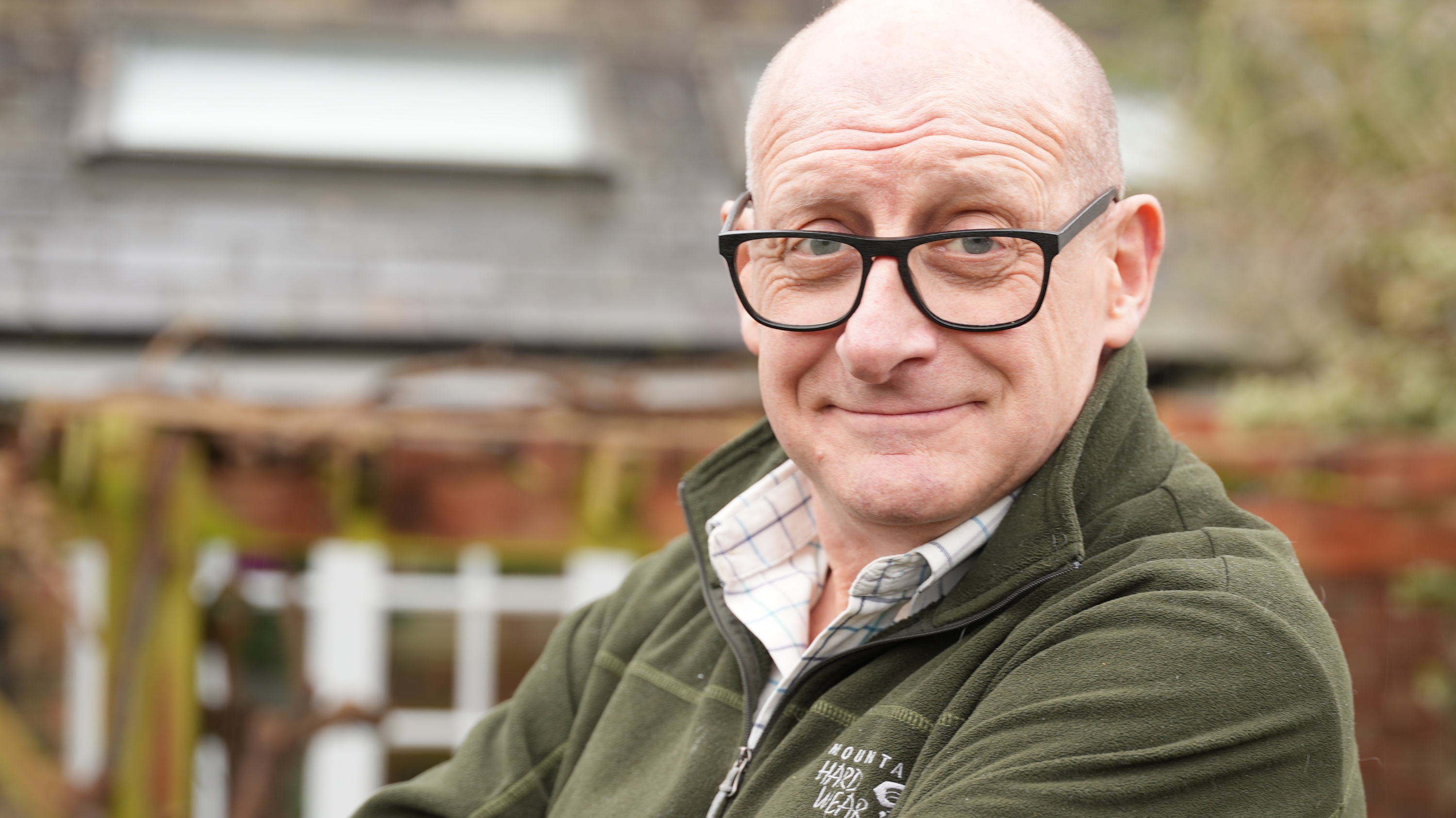
- Bucknall in March 2026
- Born: Harry Corfield Bucknall; 27 November 1965 (age 60)
- Education: Harrow School
- Occupations: Retired Army Officer, Author
- Writing career
- Notable works: In the Dolphin's Wake, Like a Tramp Like a Pilgrim, A Road for All Seasons A Tribute to Britain

Harry Corfield Bucknall (born 27 November 1965) is a British writer best known for books In the Dolphin's Wake and Like a Tramp Like a Pilgrim. He drew inspiration for these books from several major trips he took throughout his life. Bucknall has written for multiple newspapers and outlets, including The Spectator, The Scotsman, and Country Life.

His latest book, “A Road for All Seasons: A Tribute to Britain” was published by Little Brown on 19 March 2026. It tells the story of a 6,518-mile pilgrimage across the length and breadth of Britain in four journeys which mirror the changing seasons.

Bucknall’s route goes from the island of Mull to Sunderland, and from Aberystwyth to Aldeburgh. He travels through various cities, towns, and rural areas. His goal is to find the essential character of the country. Along the journey, he meets a cast of diverse characters whose stories he uses to build a social and cultural snapshot of 21st century Britain.

Bucknall was born in London, the son of Capt. Robin Corfield Bucknall and Diana Beckingham. His paternal grandfather was Lt Gen Gerard Bucknall. He is the younger brother of Sir James Bucknall.

He was educated at the Harrow School and the Royal Military Academy Sandhurst and served as an officer in the Coldstream Guards for 12 years.

After retiring, Bucknall set out on a 5,500 mile journey from Venice to Istanbul via 36 islands and every island chain in the Greek Archipelago. It included 57 sea passages on 35 ferries, four landing craft, three hydrofoils, a fishing caique and a sea plane. The story of the trip became his first book, In the Dolphin's Wake.

In 2012 Bucknall embarked on another trip, where he walked 1,411 miles from London to Rome following the Via Francigena, an ancient pilgrim path. The story of this journey, Like a Tramp Like a Pilgrim, was published by Bloomsbury Publishing in July 2014.

In December 2014, Buckall and his former army driver Jock Davis, now a sergeant in the Metropolitan Police, walked 133 miles from Dorset to London in order to raise funds for homeless former servicemen and women. A year later, they followed it up with a 335-mile walk from the Scottish borders to St Paul's Cathedral in London, following the journey made by George Monck, 1st Duke of Albemarle when he marched from Coldstream to London enabling the Restoration of King Charles II. Their 14-day walk raised £28,000 for homeless veterans.

Bucknall was admitted as a Freeman of the City of London in 2015.
