= Chapel Lawn =

Village in Shropshire, England

Coordinates: 52.381°N 3.007°W

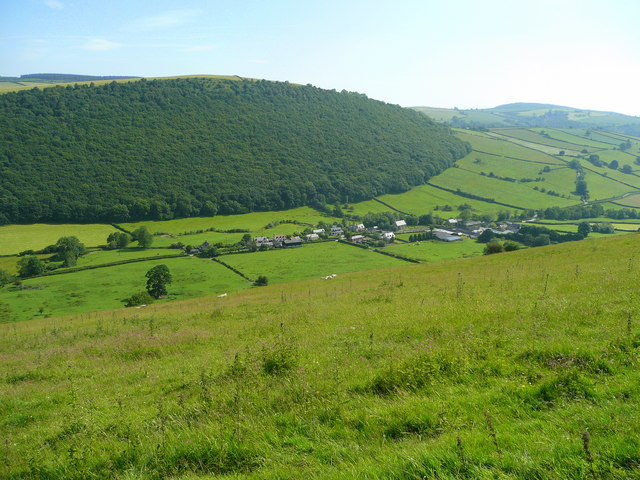
- Chapel Lawn nestled in the Redlake valley

- Location within Shropshire
- OS grid reference: SO314764
- Civil parish: Clun
- Unitary authority: Shropshire
- Ceremonial county: Shropshire
- Region: West Midlands
- Country: England
- Sovereign state: United Kingdom
- Post town: BUCKNELL
- Postcode district: SY7
- Dialling code: 01547
- Police: West Mercia
- Fire: Shropshire
- Ambulance: West Midlands
- UK Parliament: Ludlow

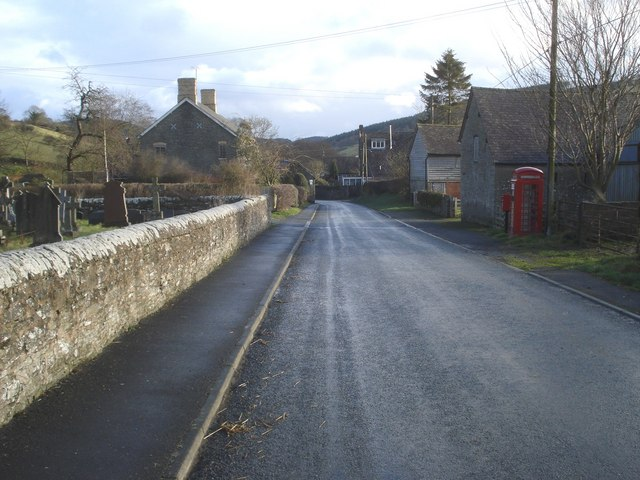
Chapel Lawn village

Chapel Lawn is a small village in southwest Shropshire, England, located within the Redlake Valley, some three miles south of the small town of Clun.

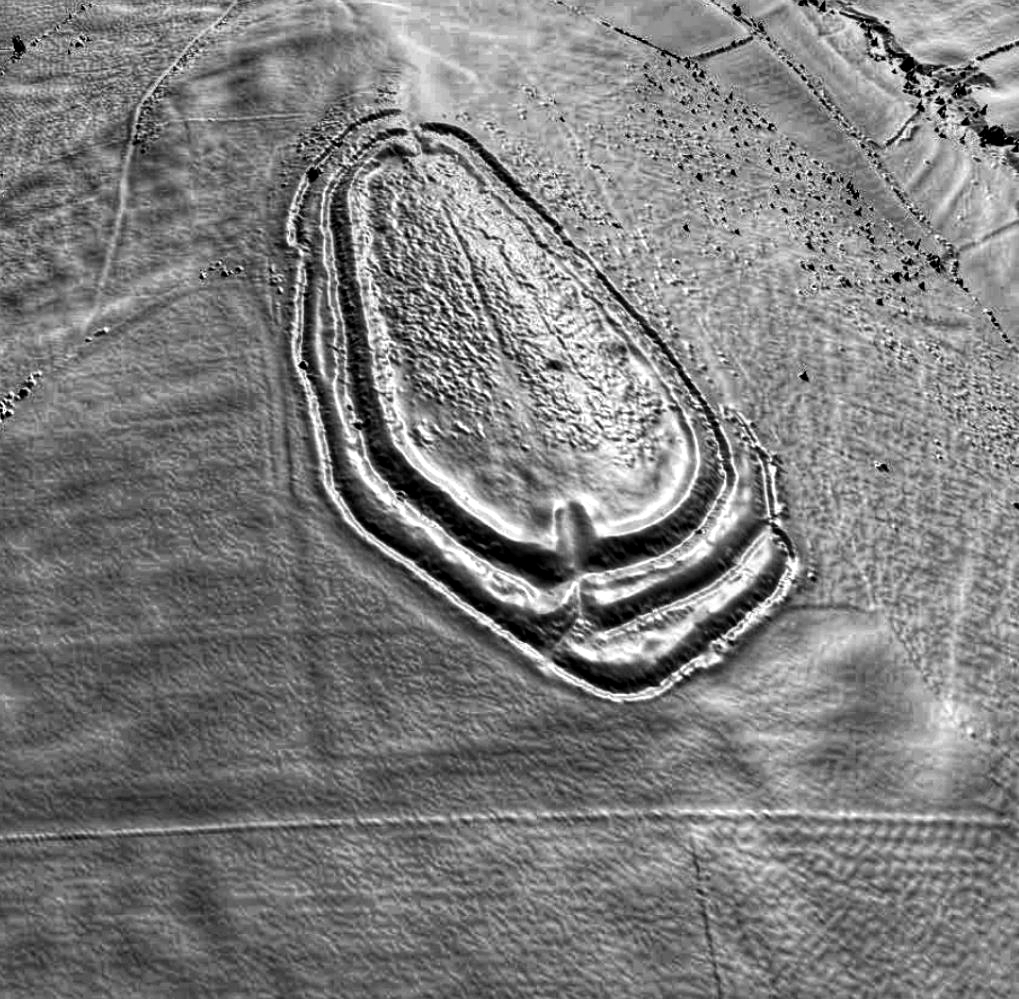
A lidar view of Caer Caradoc

Chapel Lawn lies in an Area of Outstanding Natural Beauty bounded to the north by Bryneddin Wood, an ancient deciduous wood containing extensive plantings of Sessile Oak. On Caer Caradoc, a 399-metre (1,309 ft) hill less than 1 kilometre south of the village, can be found an Iron Age fort with mounds and ditches well defined and scheduled by English Heritage.

== History ==
The name is derived from a chapel attached to Chapel Lawn Farm in the 16th century and "lawn" refers to a grassy clearing in the forest. A school was built in the village in 1856, on the former village green. It had to close in 1985 due to diminished numbers of children; the nearest primary school is now in Bucknell. The history of the village and surrounding townships is gradually being researched and placed on a website by a group of local residents.

== Civil parish ==
The village lies in the civil parish of Clun and with the surrounding countryside forms one of the two wards of the parish. The parish council is formally called "Clun Town Council with Chapel Lawn".

== Features ==
There is a village hall in Chapel Lawn for the local rural community, called the Redlake Valley Village Hall. It was built in 1952.

Many public footpaths cross the Redlake Valley enabling walkers to see the features above, and an information board at the village hall car park, next to the church, displays a map together with local information. Walkers are free to leave their cars at this car park whilst enjoying the local sights. Numerous sheep and cattle graze on the higher fields and walkers are asked to obey the Countryside Code, closing gates after themselves and keeping dogs under control. A local conservation spot, Hodre Pond, lies along the road to Obley, some 1.5 km from the village centre and dates back some 400 years. The pond boasts many aquatic species of flora and fauna.

== Church ==
St Mary's Church in the centre of Chapel Lawn was designed by Edward Haycock Snr in the lancet style and erected in 1844. It was planned to provide 232 sittings, of which 162 were declared free and unappropriated forever. Originally a Chapel of Ease of Clun parish, without an adjoining vicarage and resident priest, it was built to save parishioners the long walk to Clun. Built of stone in the style of the period, it displays the typical plain lancets, flat buttresses, and western bell gable with a wide queen post roof. The polygonal apse, which forms the chancel, is unusual. The church contains war memorials in the form of a brass plaque listing local men who died serving in World War I and a stone plaque to the only man to die serving in World War II, John H.P. Adams. The churchyard contains one war grave of a soldier of the Royal Horse Artillery of World War I.

The church became a parish church in its own right in 1991, part of the benefice of Bucknell and morning services are held on the first and third Sunday of each month. It falls in the ecclesiastical parish of Clun with Chapel Lawn in the Diocese of Hereford.

== See also ==
- Listed buildings in Clun
