= Buckton Roman Fort =

- Location within Herefordshire
- 52°21′16″N 2°53′48″W
- Periods: Roman Britain, 1st–2nd century AD
- Location: Buckton, near Leintwardine, Herefordshire
- OS grid reference: SO 390 733

Scheduled monument
- Designated: 31 May 1962
- Reference no.: 1003592

Buckton Roman Fort is an archaeological site at Buckton, about 1 mile south-west of Leintwardine, in Herefordshire. England. it is a scheduled monument.

== Description ==
The Roman vicus Bravonium was established at present-day Leintwardine about AD 70; a fort was built there about AD 160, and abandoned about AD 196.

The fort at Buckton is just above the floodplain of the River Teme. The remains, entirely buried, were observed and photographed from the air by W A Baker in 1959, during a drought. There was excavation between then and 1961, from which a chronology was established.

Originally there were turf ramparts and timber gate towers, constructed about AD 80. The fort replaced an earlier fort nearby at Jay Lane. It is thought that this site had a better water supply; traces of a bath house were found to the east of the fort.

The fort was rebuilt in stone about AD 120, with a similar size, about 2.3 hectares (5.7 acres). It housed a cavalry unit. There were gates of width 22.3 metres (73 ft), inside stone gate towers; it was the largest gatehouse of an auxiliary fort known in Britain. The fort was later dismantled, perhaps to build the fort at Bravonium, and was abandoned in AD 130.

There is an adjacent fort to the north-west, entirely buried but visible on aerial photographs, of area about 1.5 hectares (3.7 acres). It is presumably associated with the larger fort, and may have been an earlier temporary fort.
