= Jay, Herefordshire =

Hamlet in Herefordshire, England

Coordinates: 52.37°N 2.897°W

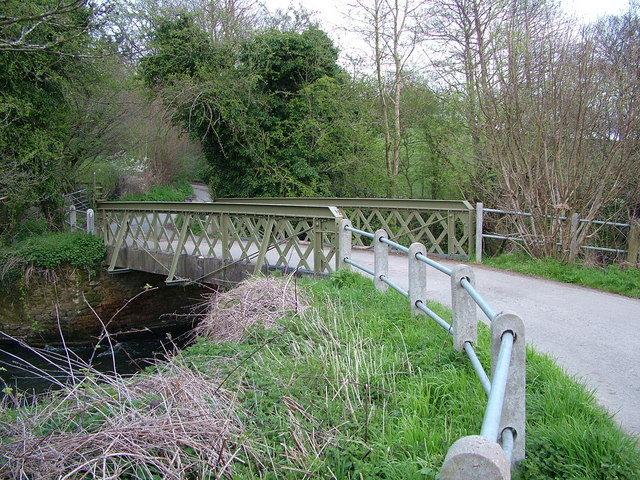
Jay Bridge, taking Jay Lane over the River Clun

Jay is a hamlet located in north Herefordshire, England.

It lies within the civil parish of Leintwardine, situated on the opposite side of the River Clun 1 mile (1.6 km) northwest of the village of Leintwardine. The road connecting Jay to Leintwardine is known as Jay Lane, and it crosses the River Clun via Jay Bridge. The minor River Redlake flows past Jay and joins the Clun just south of Jay Bridge.

Historically, Jay and the nearby hamlet of Heath were part of a single township. Although they are currently part of the civil parish of Leintwardine in Herefordshire, they were considered part of Shropshire until the mid-19th century.

Jay is of historical significance, as a Roman auxiliary cavalry fort was once situated at Jay Lane. The name "Jay", as well as that of the nearby hamlet of Beckjay (about 1 1/2 miles (2.4 km) north), is believed to reference the family of Elias de Jay, who held the local manor of Bedston until 1349. Brian de Jay, a relative of this family, was the last recorded master of the English Knights Templar.

Geographically, Jay is located near several other hamlets and villages. To the north is Broadward in Shropshire, to the west is the small village of Bedstone, also in Shropshire, and to the south is the hamlet of Buckton in Herefordshire.
