= Leintwardine =

Village in Herefordshire, England

Coordinates: 52.361°N 2.876°W

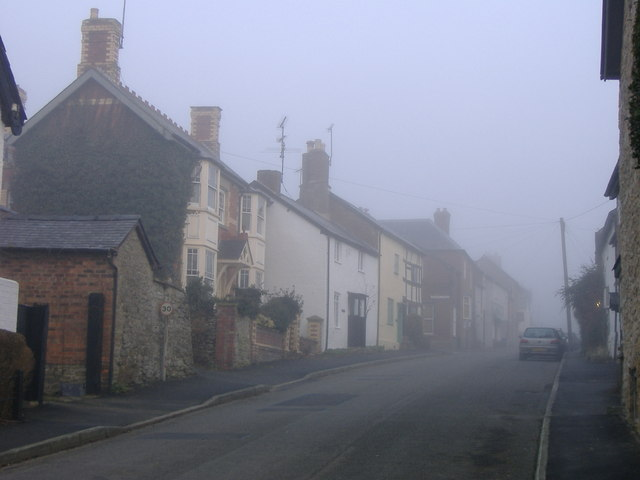
- Watling Street

- Location within Herefordshire
- Population: 830 (2011)
- OS grid reference: SO404741
  - London: 130 mi (210 km) SE
- Unitary authority: Herefordshire
- Ceremonial county: Herefordshire
- Region: West Midlands
- Country: England
- Sovereign state: United Kingdom
- Post town: CRAVEN ARMS
- Postcode district: SY7
- Dialling code: 01547
- Police: West Mercia
- Fire: Hereford and Worcester
- Ambulance: West Midlands
- UK Parliament: North Herefordshire

Leintwardine (/ˈlɛntwərdaɪn/ LENT-wər-dyne) is a small to mid-size village and civil parish in north Herefordshire, England, close to the border with Shropshire.

== History ==
=== Roman ===
A popular misconception is that the Romans called the village Branogenium. Branogenium in fact refers to a Roman fort roughly one-quarter mile (400 m) south of the village. The Roman name for Leintwardine was actually Bravonium. The High Street in Leintwardine is on the same line as the Roman road known (to the English) as Watling Street. (The modern-day street in the village named Watling Street runs to the east of the original Watling Street, roughly on the alignment of the eastern edge of the Roman settlement.)

The name Bravonium, as it appears in the Antonine Itinerary (Iter XII), is derived from the Romano-British word for quern. This suggests that there was either a hill or rock formation here that looked like a quern, or that there were quern quarries nearby. In the Upper Silurian series, the Leintwardine beds outcrop in the area and these consist of a calcareous sandstone which would have been suitable for making querns of a finer grade than could be obtained from Millstone grit, which was commonly used. Querns of this calcareous sandstone have been found at Viroconium.

Herefordshire historian Duncan Brown has argued that Leintwardine performed the role of a trading post and outpost early in the Roman conquest of Britain. It is commonly accepted that a mansio was constructed in Leintwardine. The archaeological excavations at the W. & C.A. Griffiths site prior to the construction of a modern warehouse in the early 1990s discovered Roman baths, which further points to Leintwardine being a "travel lodge" of Roman Britain.

The construction of a rampart in around 170 AD (ranging up to two metres tall), and still visible in places around Leintwardine, is thought by local historians to be the result of one of two events. The argument currently in retreat is that following a local uprising the Romans evicted all locals and constructed a rampart and palisade. The preferred line is that the ramparts were built following widespread local unrest to protect the mansio and the baths, which serviced Roman cavalry forts to the north, south and north-west. There exists a Roman praetorium/principia one mile (1.6 km) southwest of Leintwardine atop Brandon Hill, believed to have contained a storage depot, regimental HQ, latrines and cookhouse. Aerial photographs as early at the middle 1950s showed circular crop marks within the confines of the hill fort. Much of the site's earthworks still exist and Brandon Hill remains an impressive sight.

Roman forts also existed near Leintwardine at Jay Lane and Buckton.

Graves dug in Leintwardine's church, St Mary Magdalene, to a depth of 8 ft show a clear strata level of broken pottery sherds and charcoal, evidence of burning. This is in line with the historical thought that Roman Leintwardine burnt down much like the nearby Roman towns of Magnis, (Kenchester) and Ariconium (Weston-under-Penyard).

=== Medieval ===
Leintwardine is listed in the Domesday Book of 1086 as Lenteurde, and was recorded as being a large settlement for its time. Its name is apparently derived from the Romano-British name for the River Teme – formerly known as the Lent which means simply 'torrent, stream' (liyants) – coupled with the Old English word 'enclosure' (worþ], later replaced by wording 'enclosed settlement'. The modern name therefore means 'the enclosed settlement on the River Lent'.

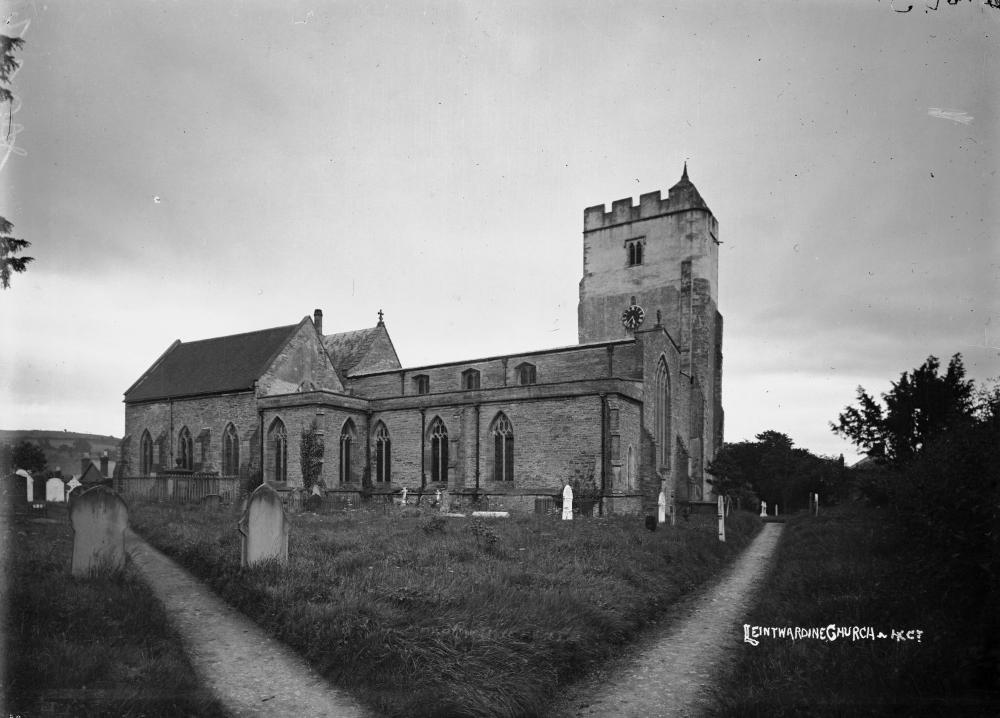
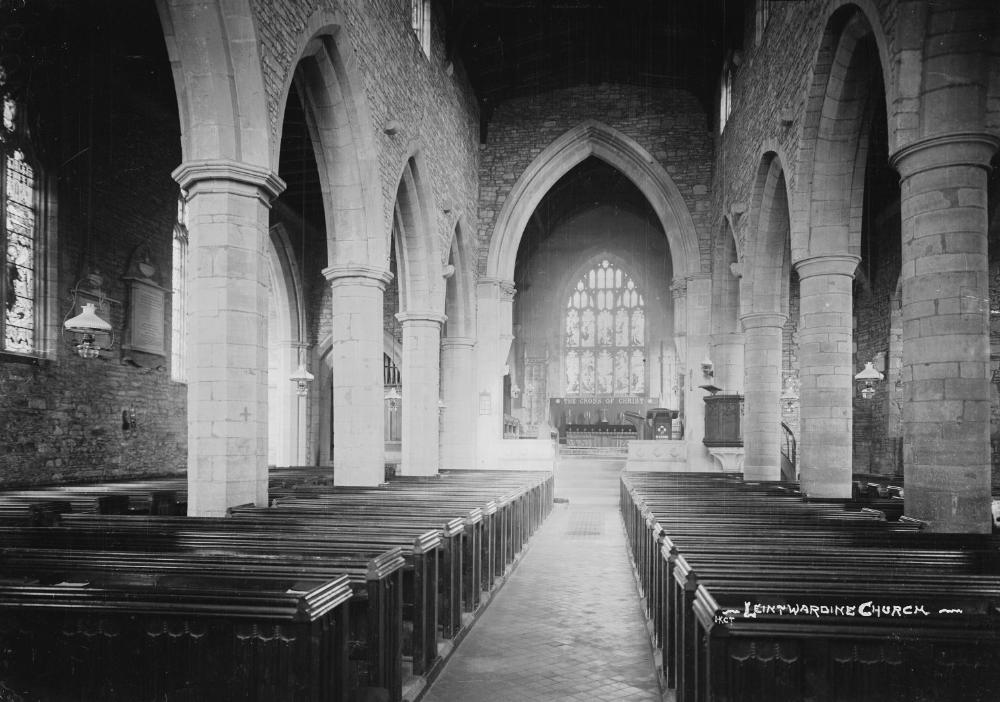
Leintwardine Church, photographed in the 1910s by Percy Benzie Abery

Leintwardine was a hundred at the time of the Domesday Book, which was regarded as a Shropshire hundred and which spanned north into present-day Shropshire (along the vicinity of the Roman road towards Wroxeter) as well as south into present-day Herefordshire. This hundred did not survive long after Domesday, and the village and other places in the hundred's southern half later in medieval times formed part of the new Herefordshire hundred of Wigmore, whilst by the end of the 12th century the northern half had become parts of the new Shropshire hundreds of Purslow and (to a lesser degree) Munslow.

Roger Mortimer, 1st Earl of March, paramour of Edward II's Queen Isabella and usurper of the young Edward III's kingship, founded a collegiate chantry at Leintwardine and built the Mortimer Chapel at the church of St Mary Magdalene, now known as the Lady Chapel, where prayers could be said for the souls of his family. It was to the chapel that in September and November 1353 Edward III made pilgrimages, laying a cloth of gold at the feet of the statue of the Virgin Mary on the occasion of his September visit.

=== Early modern ===
General Sir Banastre Tarleton lived here after retirement. He died in 1833 and is buried at St. Mary's church, where there is a monument.

== Geography ==
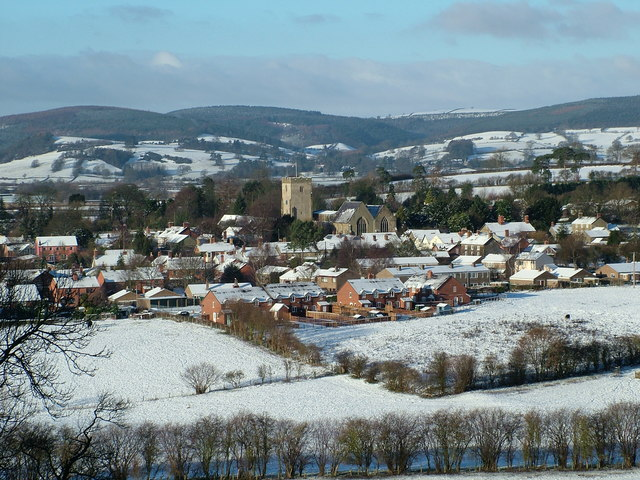
The village from Church Hill, in the snow

The parish is the most northerly in Herefordshire. Neighbouring civil parishes are Adforton, Bedstone (Shropshire), Bromfield (Shropshire), Buckton and Coxall, Burrington, Clungunford (Shropshire), Downton, Hopton Castle (Shropshire), Onibury (Shropshire), and Walford, Letton and Newton.

To the northwest are the hamlets of Jay and Heath, which formed a township and whilst in the present day form part of the civil parish of Leintwardine, and thus a part of Herefordshire, were regarded as being part of Shropshire until late in the 19th century.

The River Clun flows into the River Teme to the southwest of the village.

The A4113 road passes through the village, on the alignment of the Roman road. The A4110 road forks off the A4113 just south of Leintwardine. The market town of Ludlow is 8 miles (13 km) away, in Shropshire.

The closest railway station is located on the Heart of Wales Line being Hopton Heath station with trains run by Transport for Wales.

== Community ==
Leintwardine is home to the Conservative MP Philip Dunne, who represented the Ludlow constituency until 2024, and Leintwardine itself is represented by Ellie Chowns, MP for North Herefordshire.

Amenities in the village include a fire station (Hereford and Worcester Fire and Rescue Service), a primary school and a library. There are two churches: one (the historic parish church of St Mary Magdalene) is Church of England/Anglican, the other a Methodist hall. There is also a village hall and neighbouring community centre (combined with the library).

Local businesses include the Sun Inn, one of the country's last remaining parlour inns and one of CAMRA's listed heritage pubs.
