= Bucknell, Shropshire =

Village in Shropshire, England

Coordinates: 52.360°N 2.950°W

Bucknell
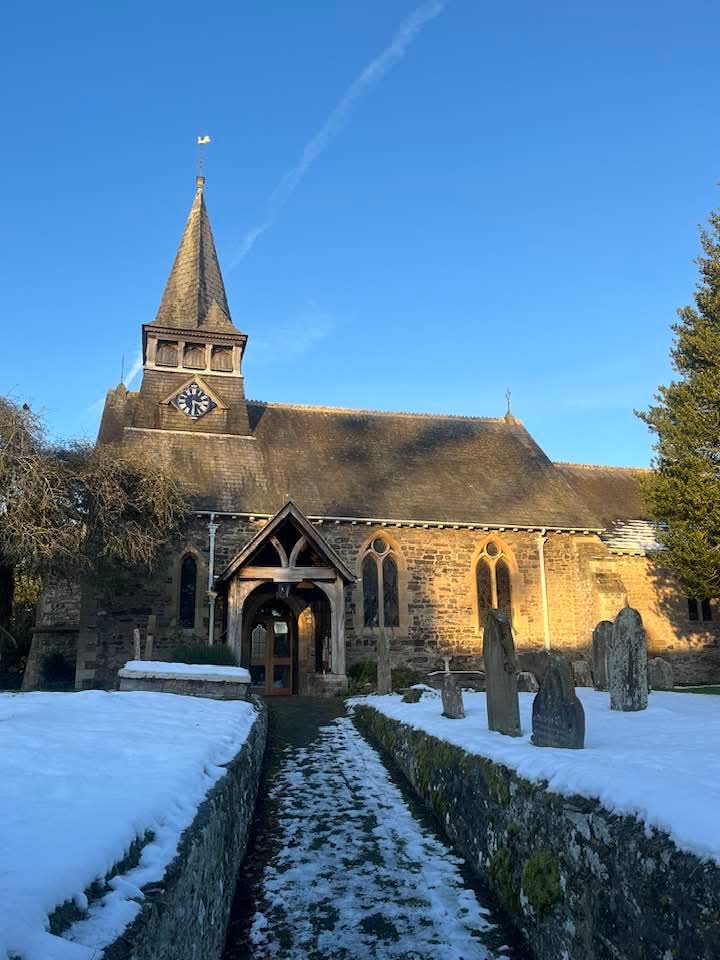
- St Mary's Bucknell

- Location within Shropshire
- Population: 717 (2011)
- OS grid reference: SO353740
- Civil parish: Bucknell
- Unitary authority: Shropshire
- Ceremonial county: Shropshire
- Region: West Midlands
- Country: England
- Sovereign state: United Kingdom
- Post town: BUCKNELL
- Postcode district: SY7
- Dialling code: 01547
- Police: West Mercia
- Fire: Shropshire
- Ambulance: West Midlands
- UK Parliament: Ludlow

Bucknell is a village and civil parish in south Shropshire, England. The village lies on the River Redlake, within 660 yards (600 m) of the River Teme and close to the border of Wales and Herefordshire. It is about 6 miles (9.7 km) east of Knighton and is set within the Shropshire Hills Area of Outstanding Natural Beauty.

The name is derived from Old English and means 'Bucca's hill' or 'he-goats' hill'.

The village has the "P"s identified by Country Life as essential to a successful village: a pub, a post office, a place of worship, a primary school and public transport.

== History ==
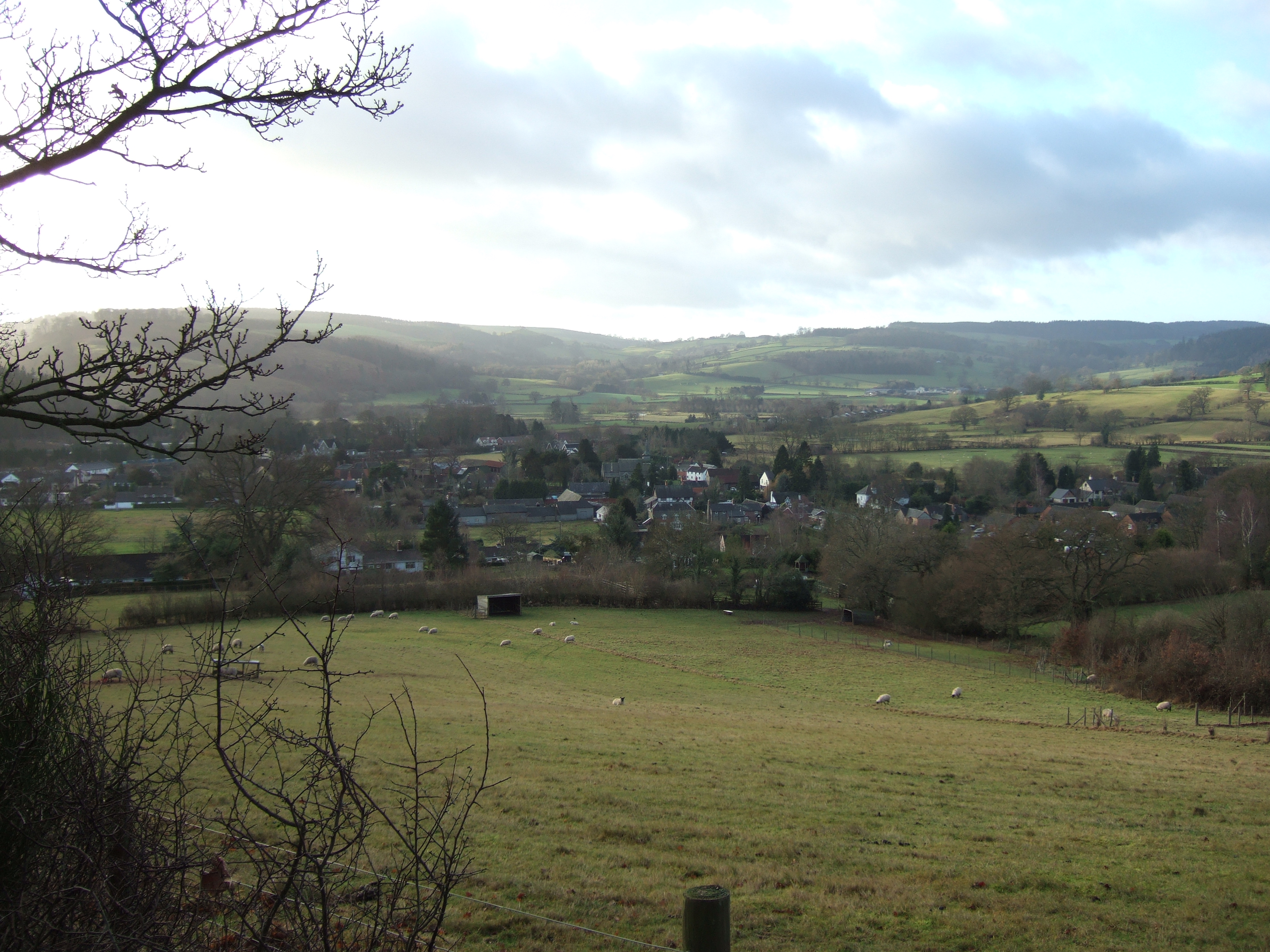
Bucknell from the north west

The settlement of Bucknell was first mentioned in the Domesday Book of 1086, as Buckehale or Buckenhill. At the time of the Domesday survey, the Shropshire and Herefordshire boundary divided the village. The Norman magnate Roger de Montgomery held the village from the King. He built many castles including Montgomery, Shrewsbury, Ludlow, Clun, Hopton and Oswestry; at the time over 90 per cent of the lordships and manors of Shropshire were held in Chief by him. His under-tenants in this area were Ralph de Mortimer, who held Bucknell (amongst his 123 manors with his chief domain in England being at Wigmore Castle), and William de Picot (also known as Picot de Say), with his chief domain at Clun Castle.

The earth mound at The Olde Farm in Bucknell is the remains of a Norman motte castle situated on the banks of the River Redlake, close to a river crossing point and to the Parish Church. In 1554–55 an Act of Parliament was passed transferring the whole of Bucknell to the county of Shropshire. The Lords of the Manor at that time were the Sitwell family.

Historically, most of the male population worked in agriculture and timber.

== Buildings ==
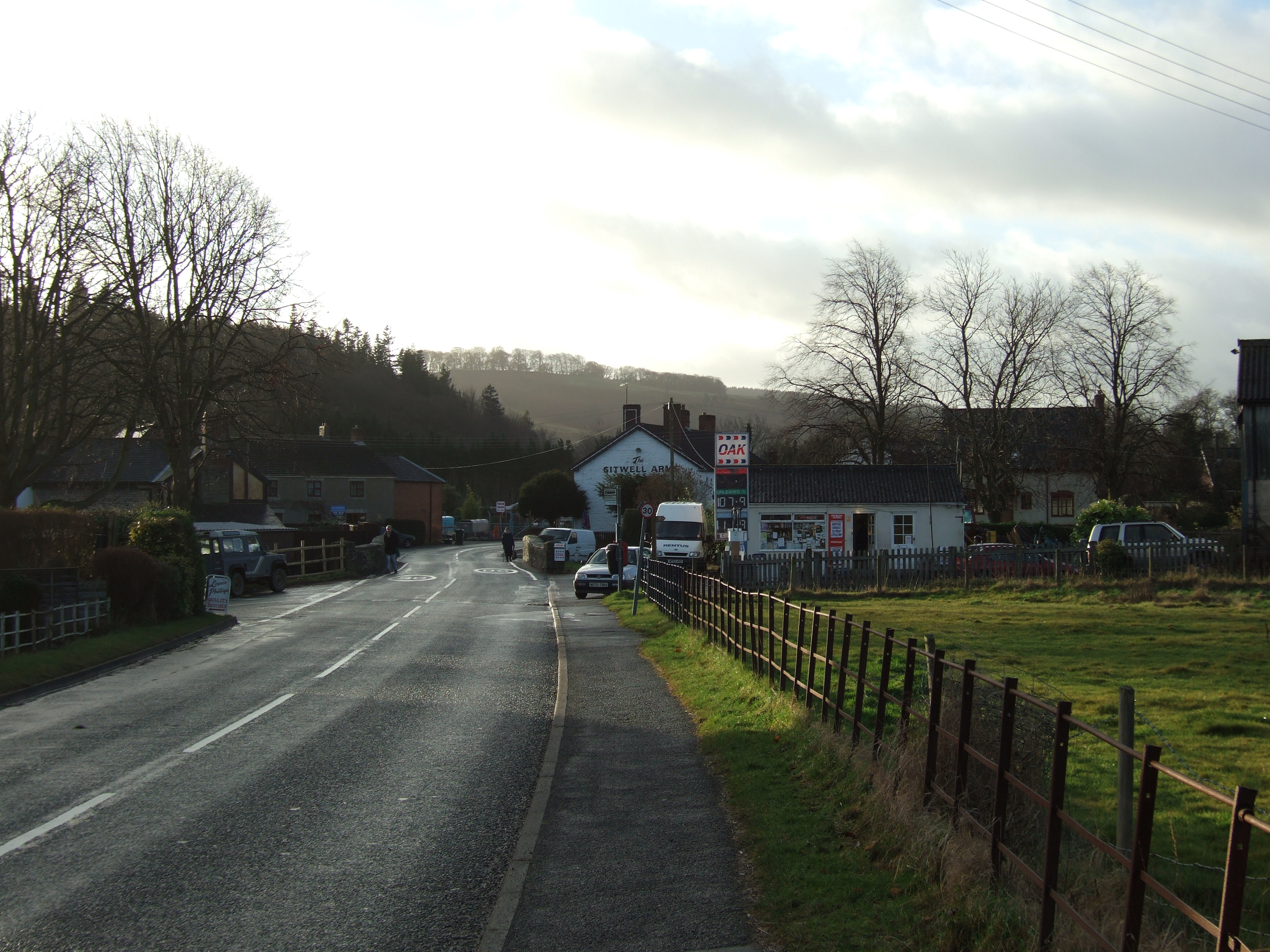
Local services in the village; the Sitwell Arms is in the background

The earliest of the existing buildings date back to the 17th century. The houses were built in a haphazard fashion near the river with easy access to water. The village depended on water from the river and wells until the 1920s when water was piped into the village from a spring above Chapel Lawn. The houses at the lower end of the village were very susceptible to flooding, and this hazard continued until the ford was walled up in the 1950s.

Bucknell had four pubs: The Sitwell Arms, The Plough (just opposite), The Railway Tavern and The Bridge End. The latter three are all now private houses. Bucknell also had a shop and bakery in the Square and its own corn mill which was at the west end of the village. Bucknell Post office opened in the mid-19th century. The original post office was just round the corner and still goes by the name of The Old Post Office. The butcher's shop is still on its original site.

After World War I a Memorial Hall was built in the village, originally from a mess hut removed from a Canadian Army camp, and still stands. It contains plaques in memory of men from the parish who died serving in the World Wars. One of those behind its construction was William Burgoyne.

== Services ==
Today the village boasts an impressive number of businesses and public services for its size: a public house (The Sitwell Arms), a post office, a butcher, Bucknell Nurseries as well as a railway station on the Heart of Wales Line and the primary school. The Church, St Mary's, is well supported and hosts a weekly drop-in cafe run by volunteers. A major employer is Hornsey Steels, recently enlarged and now on the Old Coal Yard. There are also car repair garages and a petrol forecourt and shop.

== The school ==
The Old School House was built in the 16th century, this part being the part of the building next to the river to provide education for those who could pay for it. The school remained until the present one was built in 1865. The Old School House then became a shop and bakers before becoming a private dwelling. The front part of the building pre-dates the rear by around 200 years making it 13th/14th century and whilst being restored was found to have once existed as a ground floor-only property and evidence of an open fire pit and an opening in the roof to allow the smoke to escape; this pre-dates the inglenook fireplace to the rear and was believed to have been a medieval great hall. Restoration was completed in 1999.

The land upon which the present school was built was given in 1865. The first schoolmaster appointed in 1867 to the new St Mary's National School was Mr Henry Evans, 24 years old. The school was extensively re-modelled in 1966 when additional teaching space and a kitchen was added enabling meals to be cooked on the premises. St Mary's school is a maintained Church of England co-educational catering for children between the ages of 2 and 11 years.

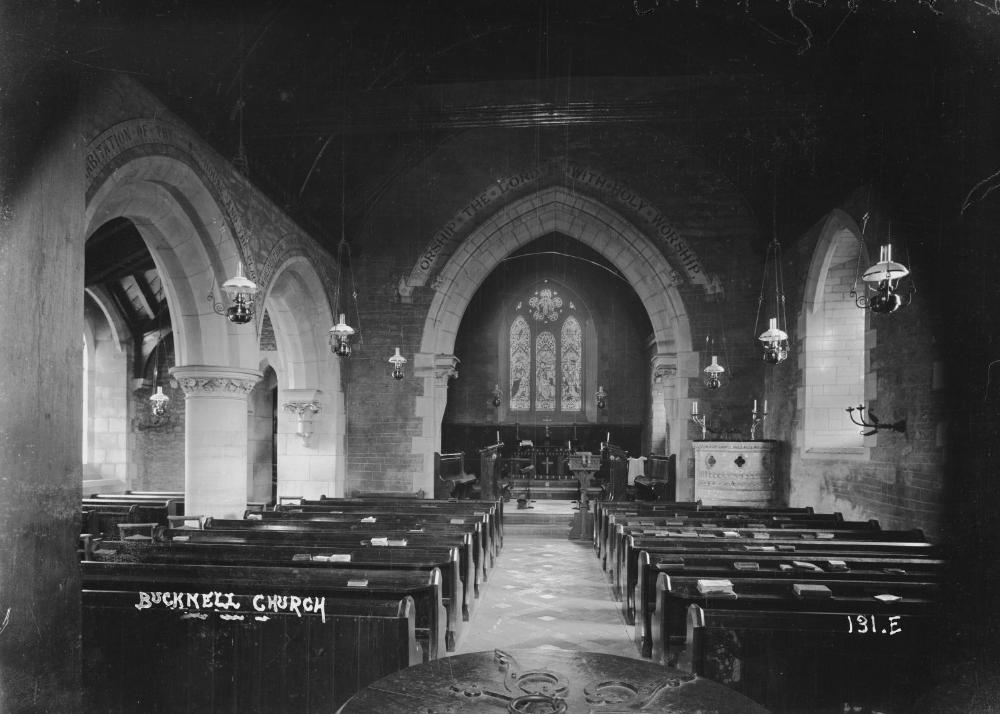
Bucknell church c.1910s

== Places of worship ==
- St Mary's Church (Church of England)
- The Methodist Chapel in Dog Kennel Lane (now a private house)
- Coxall Chapel (Baptist) on the road to Bedstone (now a private house)

== Population ==
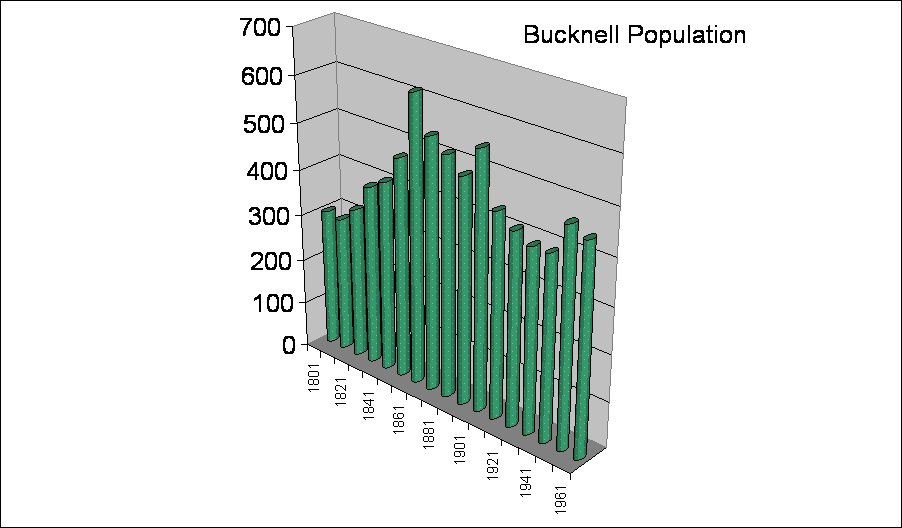
Bucknell population trends

The population of the village in 1811 Census was 226. At the end of the 19th century this had risen to 546. In the 1981 Census the population of the village was 494; in 1991 the population of the parish (probably including Bedstone) was 601 consisting of some 250 dwellings and in 2001 it was 642 in 294 dwellings. The 2021 Census showed that the population had risen to 740, 31.5% of those aged under 17 and 15.2% over 65.

== Transport ==
The village has a railway station on the Heart of Wales Line. There are nine trains a day on weekdays and eight on Saturdays, five/four to Shrewsbury and four to Swansea (plus two each way on Sundays). There is also a bus service to Knighton and Ludlow.

== Bucknell F.C. ==
Bucknell F.C., now defunct, were an association football club who played in the Mid Wales South League (despite being based in England, they played in the Welsh football league system) and the Herefordshire Football League. They played at the Daffodil Lane Recreation Ground.

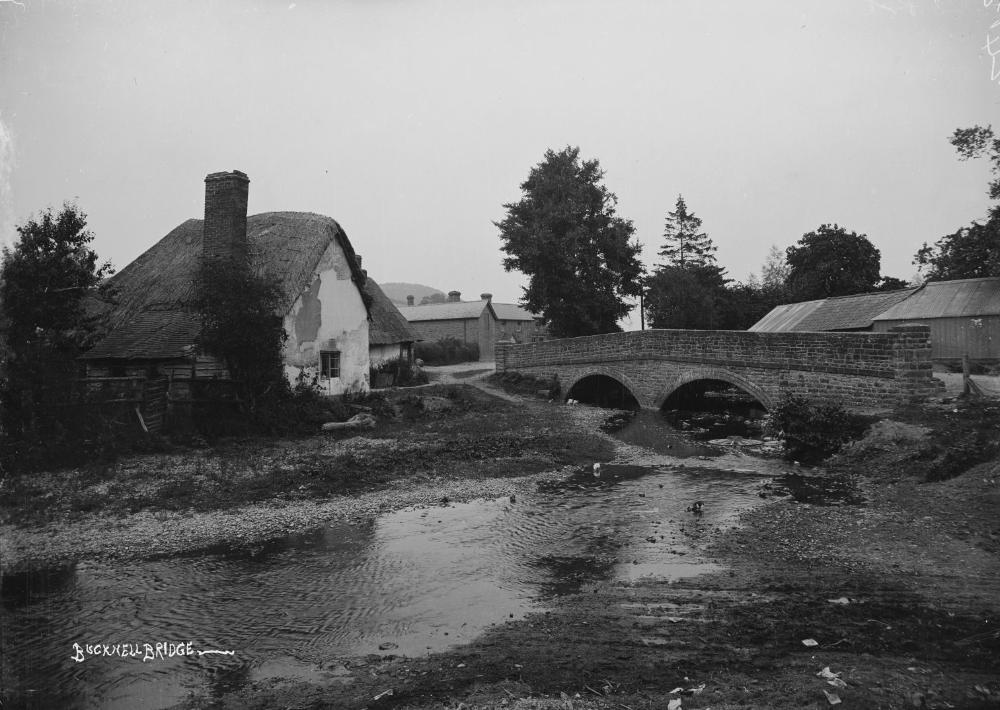
Bucknell bridge; 1900s

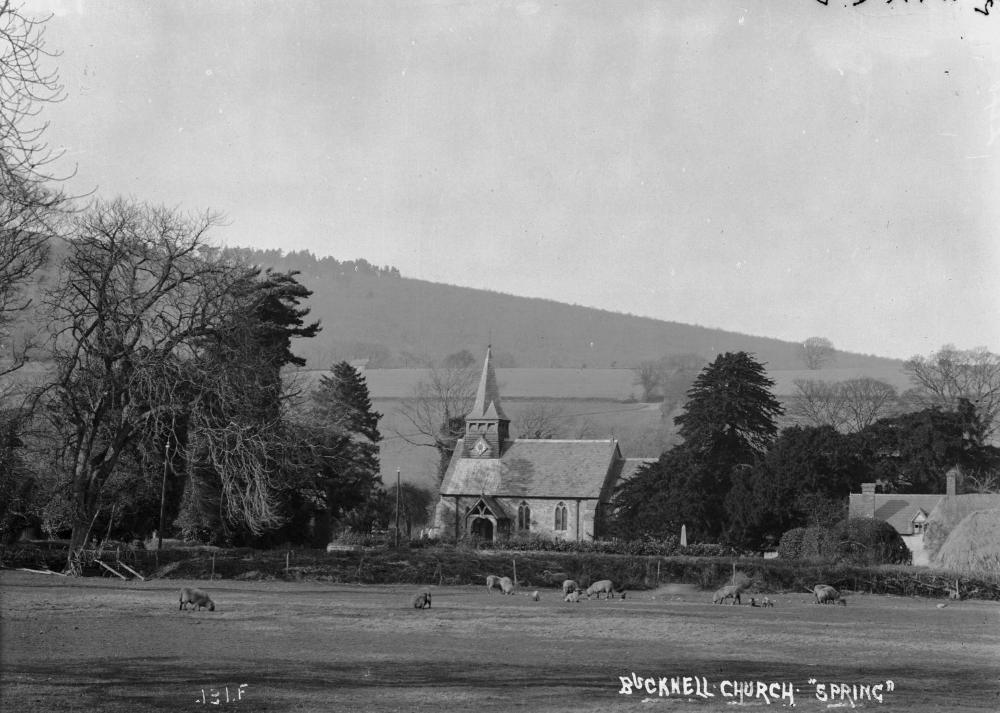
Church; 1900s

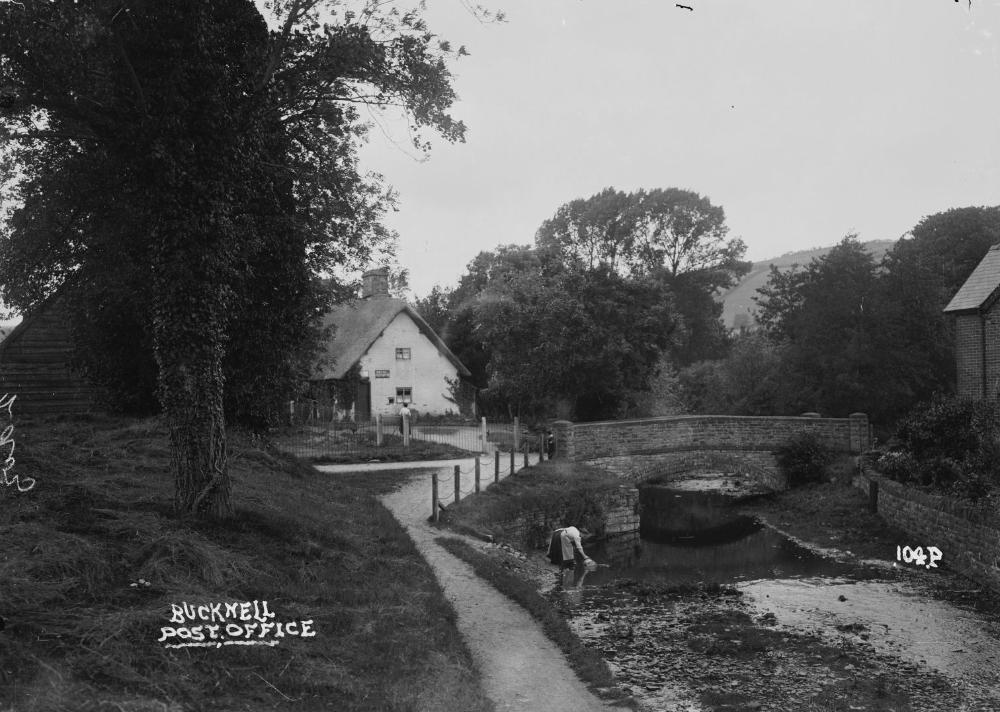
Post Office; 1900s

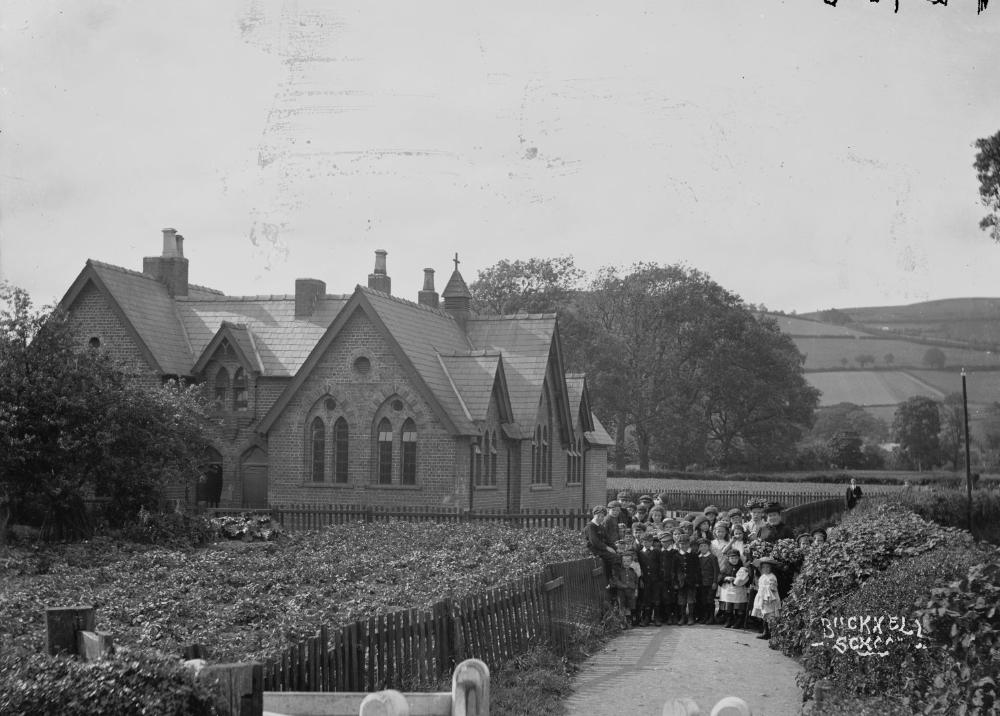
School; 1900s

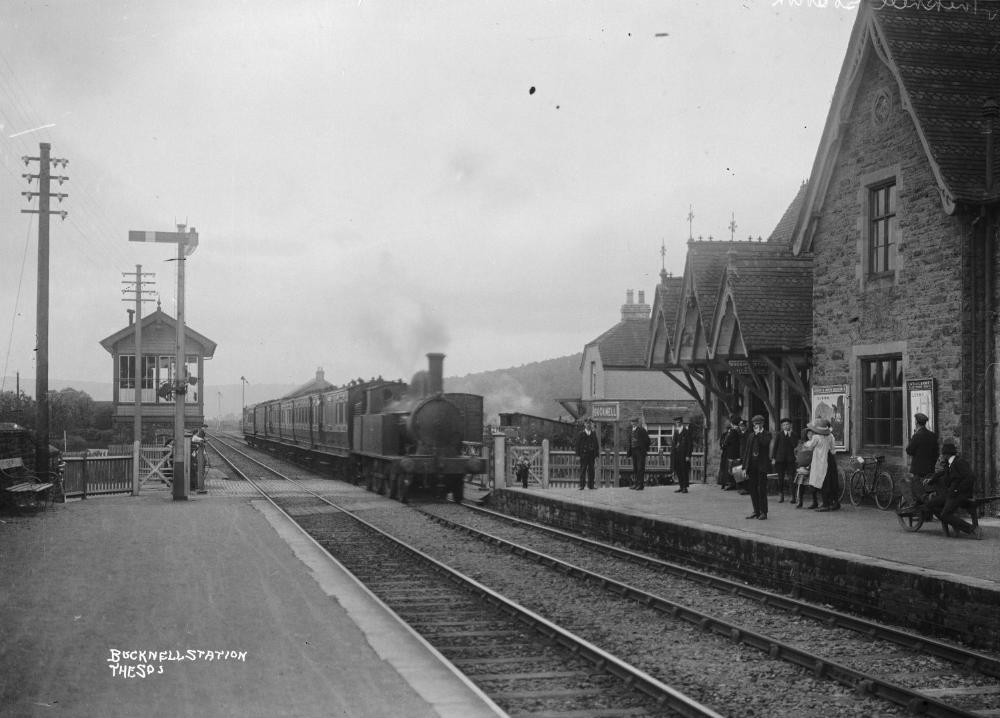
Railway station; 1900s

== See also ==
- Listed buildings in Bucknell, Shropshire
