= List of civil parishes in Shropshire =

The civil parishes of Shropshire.

This is a list of civil parishes in the ceremonial county of Shropshire, England. There are 230 civil parishes. The whole of the county is parished.

Population figures are unavailable for some of the smallest parishes.

Civil parish	Civil parish population 2011	Area (km^{2}) 2011	Pre 1974 district	District
Abdon and Heath	181	22.82	Ludlow Rural District	Shropshire
Acton Burnell	544	6.70	Atcham Rural District	Shropshire
Acton Round			Bridgnorth Rural District	Shropshire
Acton Scott	104	7.81	Ludlow Rural District	Shropshire
Adderley	372	19.65	Market Drayton Rural District	Shropshire
Alberbury with Cardeston	1,011	40.61	Atcham Rural District	Shropshire
Albrighton and Donington			Shifnal Rural District	Shropshire
All Stretton	120	7.25	Atcham Rural District	Shropshire
Alveley	2,098	22.09	Bridgnorth Rural District	Shropshire
Ashford Bowdler	890	6.73	Ludlow Rural District	Shropshire
Ashford Carbonel	321	6.35	Ludlow Rural District	Shropshire
Astley Abbotts	476	13.44	Bridgnorth Rural District	Shropshire
Astley	449	8.42	Atcham Rural District	Shropshire
Aston Botterell			Bridgnorth Rural District	Shropshire
Aston Eyre	271	21.02	Bridgnorth Rural District	Shropshire
Atcham	243	11.34	Atcham Rural District	Shropshire
Badger	126	3.74	Shifnal Rural District	Shropshire
Barrow	680	25.31	Bridgnorth Rural District	Shropshire
Baschurch	2,503	31.84	North Shropshire Rural District	Shropshire
Bayston Hill	5,079	8.64	Atcham Rural District	Shropshire
Beckbury	340	5.45	Shifnal Rural District	Shropshire
Bedstone	272	13.67	Clun and Bishop's Castle Rural District	Shropshire
Berrington	1,059	17.87	Atcham Rural District	Shropshire
Bettws-y-Crwyn	239	36.76	Clun and Bishop's Castle Rural District	Shropshire
Bicton	1,062	18.55	Atcham Rural District	Shropshire
Billingsley	208	5.26	Bridgnorth Rural District	Shropshire
Bishop's Castle (town)	1,893	7.55	Clun and Bishop's Castle Rural District	Shropshire
Bitterley	902	29.26	Ludlow Rural District	Shropshire
Boningale	302	9.20	Shifnal Rural District	Shropshire
Boraston	178	5.08	Ludlow Rural District	Shropshire
Bomere Heath and District	2,118	34.59	Atcham Rural District	Shropshire
Bridgnorth (town)	12,079	10.69	Bridgnorth Rural District	Shropshire
Bromfield	277	24.67	Ludlow Rural District	Shropshire
Broseley (town)	4,929	7.41	Bridgnorth Rural District	Shropshire
Bucknell	717	9.89	Clun and Bishop's Castle Rural District	Shropshire
Buildwas	321	8.21	Atcham Rural District	Shropshire
Burford	1,382	6.02	Ludlow Rural District	Shropshire
Burwarton	233	11.41	Bridgnorth Rural District	Shropshire
Cardington	459	22.87	Atcham Rural District	Shropshire
Caynham	1,489	9.53	Ludlow Rural District	Shropshire
Chelmarsh	518	13.28	Bridgnorth Rural District	Shropshire
Cheswardine	1,076	22.16	Market Drayton Rural District	Shropshire
Chetton	349	16.32	Bridgnorth Rural District	Shropshire
Chetwynd Aston and Woodcote	468	13.05	Wellington Rural District	Telford and Wrekin
Chetwynd	562	19.67	Wellington Rural District	Telford and Wrekin
Child's Ercall	732	15.16	Market Drayton Rural District	Shropshire
Chirbury with Brompton	971	53.11	Clun and Bishop's Castle Rural District	Shropshire
Church Aston	1,354	7.28	Wellington Rural District	Telford and Wrekin
Church Preen			Atcham Rural District	Shropshire
Church Pulverbatch	361	17.65	Atcham Rural District	Shropshire
Church Stretton (town)	4,671	31.33	Ludlow Rural District	Shropshire
Claverley	1,620	33.26	Bridgnorth Rural District	Shropshire
Clee St. Margaret	162	8.07	Ludlow Rural District	Shropshire
Cleobury Mortimer (town)	3,036	20.05	Ludlow Rural District	Shropshire
Cleobury North			Bridgnorth Rural District	Shropshire
Clive	530	6.02	North Shropshire Rural District	Shropshire
Clun (town)	1,184	60.79	Clun and Bishop's Castle Rural District	Shropshire
Clunbury	552	31.62	Clun and Bishop's Castle Rural District	Shropshire
Clungunford	316	13.43	Clun and Bishop's Castle Rural District	Shropshire
Cockshutt	787	22.20	North Shropshire Rural District	Shropshire
Colebatch	210	28.58	Clun and Bishop's Castle Rural District	Shropshire
Condover	1,957	30.29	Atcham Rural District	Shropshire
Coreley	388	8.90	Ludlow Rural District	Shropshire
Cound	476	15.13	Atcham Rural District	Shropshire
Craven Arms (town)	2,595	18.43	Ludlow Rural District	Shropshire
Cressage	707	4.11	Atcham Rural District	Shropshire
Culmington	423	14.38	Ludlow Rural District	Shropshire
Dawley Hamlets	6,431	3.80	Dawley Urban District	Telford and Wrekin
Deuxhill			Bridgnorth Rural District	Shropshire
Diddlebury	670	35.52	Ludlow Rural District	Shropshire
Ditton Priors	821	22.52	Bridgnorth Rural District	Shropshire
Donnington and Muxton				Telford and Wrekin
Eardington	530	5.29	Bridgnorth Rural District	Shropshire
Easthope			Bridgnorth Rural District	Shropshire
Eaton-under-Heywood	171	15.12	Ludlow Rural District	Shropshire
Edgmond	2,062	16.95	Wellington Rural District	Telford and Wrekin
Edgton			Clun and Bishop's Castle Rural District	Shropshire
Ellesmere Rural	2,484	59.48	North Shropshire Rural District	Shropshire
Ellesmere Urban (town)	3,835	4.94	North Shropshire Rural District	Shropshire
Ercall Magna	1,639	37.39	Wellington Rural District	Telford and Wrekin
Eyton upon the Weald Moors			Wellington Rural District	Telford and Wrekin
Farlow	445	9.91	Bridgnorth Rural District	Shropshire
Ford			Atcham Rural District	Shropshire
Frodesley	256	15.07	Atcham Rural District	Shropshire
Glazeley			Bridgnorth Rural District	Shropshire
Great Dawley (town)	11,709	4.61	Dawley Urban District	Telford and Wrekin
Great Hanwood	1,090	4.67	Atcham Rural District	Shropshire
Great Ness	879	15.77	Atcham Rural District	Shropshire
Greete			Ludlow Rural District	Shropshire
Grinshill	274	3.36	North Shropshire Rural District	Shropshire
Hadley and Leegomery	14,466	9.36	Wellington Rural District	Telford and Wrekin
Hadnall	688	9.11	North Shropshire Rural District	Shropshire
Harley	163	8.39	Atcham Rural District	Shropshire
Highley	3,605	6.38	Bridgnorth Rural District	Shropshire
Hinstock	1,200	13.22	Market Drayton Rural District	Shropshire
Hodnet	1,534	38.85	Market Drayton Rural District	Shropshire
Hollinswood and Randlay	6,009	4.56	Dawley Urban District	Telford and Wrekin
Hope Bagot			Ludlow Rural District	Shropshire
Hope Bowdler	233	7.17	Ludlow Rural District	Shropshire
Hopesay	561	19.66	Clun and Bishop's Castle Rural District	Shropshire
Hopton Cangeford			Ludlow Rural District	Shropshire
Hopton Castle			Clun and Bishop's Castle Rural District	Shropshire
Hopton Wafers	753	17.77	Ludlow Rural District	Shropshire
Hordley	292	13.00	North Shropshire Rural District	Shropshire
Hughley			Atcham Rural District	Shropshire
Ightfield	529	15.73	Market Drayton Rural District	Shropshire
Kemberton	244	4.50	Shifnal Rural District	Shropshire
Kenley	258	16.96	Atcham Rural District	Shropshire
Ketley	3,958	2.34	Wellington Urban District	Telford and Wrekin
Kinlet	991	33.03	Bridgnorth Rural District	Shropshire
Kinnerley	1,108	23.89	Oswestry Rural District	Shropshire
Knockin	282	7.71	Oswestry Rural District	Shropshire
Kynnersley	284	13.00	Wellington Rural District	Telford and Wrekin
Lawley and Overdale	7,015	5.55	Dawley Urban District	Telford and Wrekin
Leebotwood	231	6.75	Atcham Rural District	Shropshire
Leighton and Eaton Constantine	467	10.75	Atcham Rural District	Shropshire
Lilleshall		147.66	Oakengates Urban District	Telford and Wrekin
Little Ness	303	5.69	Atcham Rural District	Shropshire
Little Wenlock	605	16.74	Wellington Rural District	Telford and Wrekin
Llanfair Waterdine	225	32.33	Clun and Bishop's Castle Rural District	Shropshire
Llanyblodwel	767	18.14	Oswestry Rural District	Shropshire
Llanymynech and Pant	1,675	7.81	Oswestry Rural District	Shropshire
Longden	1,266	18.44	Atcham Rural District	Shropshire
Longnor	289	8.73	Atcham Rural District	Shropshire
Loppington	611	14.21	North Shropshire Rural District	Shropshire
Ludford	673	8.75	Ludlow Rural District	Shropshire
Ludlow (town)	10,266	4.54	Ludlow Rural District	Shropshire
Lydbury North	695	39.94	Clun and Bishop's Castle Rural District	Shropshire
Lydham	189	15.72	Clun and Bishop's Castle Rural District	Shropshire
Madeley (town)	17,631	8.84	Dawley Urban District	Telford and Wrekin
Mainstone			Clun and Bishop's Castle Rural District	Shropshire
Market Drayton (town)	11,773	4.61	Market Drayton Rural District	Shropshire
Melverley	156	5.79	Oswestry Rural District	Shropshire
Middleton Scriven	146	7.82	Bridgnorth Rural District	Shropshire
Milson			Ludlow Rural District	Shropshire
Minsterley	1,777	10.26	Atcham Rural District	Shropshire
Monkhopton	205	9.59	Bridgnorth Rural District	Shropshire
Montford	574	20.22	Atcham Rural District	Shropshire
More	121	14.20	Clun and Bishop's Castle Rural District	Shropshire
Moreton Corbet and Lee Brockhurst	302	17.31	North Shropshire Rural District	Shropshire
Moreton Say	485	21.63	Market Drayton Rural District	Shropshire
Morville	392	16.02	Bridgnorth Rural District	Shropshire
Much Wenlock (town)	2,877	35.41	Bridgnorth Rural District	Shropshire
Munslow	386	16.67	Ludlow Rural District	Shropshire
Myddle, Broughton and Harmer Hill	1,333	25.85	North Shropshire Rural District	Shropshire
Myndtown			Clun and Bishop's Castle Rural District	Shropshire
Nash	405	13.34	Ludlow Rural District	Shropshire
Neen Savage	350	15.39	Bridgnorth Rural District	Shropshire
Neen Sollars	252	11.43	Ludlow Rural District	Shropshire
Neenton	233	16.91	Bridgnorth Rural District	Shropshire
Newcastle on Clun	319	22.16	Clun and Bishop's Castle Rural District	Shropshire
Newport (town)	11,387	4.11	Newport Urban District	Telford and Wrekin
Norbury	136	9.42	Clun and Bishop's Castle Rural District	Shropshire
Norton in Hales	620	18.39	Market Drayton Rural District	Shropshire
Oakengates (town)	8,359	3.69	Oakengates Urban District	Telford and Wrekin
Onibury	297	12.84	Ludlow Rural District	Shropshire
Oswestry Rural	4,504	61.12	Oswestry Rural District	Shropshire
Oswestry (town)	17,105	8.82	Oswestry Rural District	Shropshire
Petton			North Shropshire Rural District	Shropshire
Pitchford	126	6.80	Atcham Rural District	Shropshire
Pontesbury	3,227	36.86	Atcham Rural District	Shropshire
Prees	2,895	33.38	North Shropshire Rural District	Shropshire
Preston upon the Weald Moors	224	4.00	Wellington Rural District	Telford and Wrekin
Quatt Malvern	200	10.97	Bridgnorth Rural District	Shropshire
Ratlinghope	138	22.13	Clun and Bishop's Castle Rural District	Shropshire
Richard's Castle (Shropshire)	424	12.14	Ludlow Rural District	Shropshire
Rodington	830	13.35	Wellington Rural District	Telford and Wrekin
Romsley	114	5.55	Bridgnorth Rural District	Shropshire
Ruckley and Langley			Atcham Rural District	Shropshire
Rudge			Bridgnorth Rural District	Shropshire
Rushbury	699	23.36	Ludlow Rural District	Shropshire
Ruyton-XI-Towns	1,379	19.57	Oswestry Rural District	Shropshire
Ryton	174	5.85	Shifnal Rural District	Shropshire
Selattyn and Gobowen	4,016	31.91	Oswestry Rural District	Shropshire
Shawbury	2,872	23.17	North Shropshire Rural District	Shropshire
Sheinton	135	9.84	Atcham Rural District	Shropshire
Sheriffhales	722	20.84	Shifnal Rural District	Shropshire
Shifnal (town)	6,776	38.64	Shifnal Rural District	Shropshire
Shipton	121	7.09	Bridgnorth Rural District	Shropshire
Shrewsbury (town)	71,715	38.00	Shrewsbury Municipal Borough	Shropshire
Sibdon Carwood			Ludlow Rural District	Shropshire
Sidbury			Bridgnorth Rural District	Shropshire
Smethcott	254	16.05	Atcham Rural District	Shropshire
St George's and Priorslee	11,033	5.30	Oakengates Urban District	Telford and Wrekin
St Martin's	2,856	12.11	Oswestry Rural District	Shropshire
Stanton Lacy	345	23.25	Ludlow Rural District	Shropshire
Stanton Long	310	14.32	Bridgnorth Rural District	Shropshire
Stanton upon Hine Heath	576	22.90	North Shropshire Rural District	Shropshire
Stirchley and Brookside	10,295	3.29	Dawley Urban District	Telford and Wrekin
Stockton	331	12.95	Bridgnorth Rural District	Shropshire
Stoke St. Milborough	409	25.35	Ludlow Rural District	Shropshire
Stoke upon Tern	2,034	23.12	Market Drayton Rural District	Shropshire
Stottesdon	782	37.41	Bridgnorth Rural District	Shropshire
Stowe	140	11.00	Clun and Bishop's Castle Rural District	Shropshire
Sutton Maddock	254	10.21	Bridgnorth Rural District	Shropshire
Sutton upon Tern	1,232	18.08	Market Drayton Rural District	Shropshire
Tasley	889	4.29	Bridgnorth Rural District	Shropshire
The Gorge	3,275	7.27	Dawley Urban District	Telford and Wrekin
Tibberton and Cherrington	698	10.42	Wellington Rural District	Telford and Wrekin
Tong	243	14.29	Shifnal Rural District	Shropshire
Uffington	234	9.53	Atcham Rural District	Shropshire
Upton Cressett			Bridgnorth Rural District	Shropshire
Upton Magna	321	13.24	Atcham Rural District	Shropshire
Waters Upton	951	18.28	Wellington Rural District	Telford and Wrekin
Wellington (town)	21,352	7.24	Wellington Urban District	Telford and Wrekin
Welshampton and Lyneal	852	28.79	North Shropshire Rural District	Shropshire
Wem Rural	1,659	51.07	North Shropshire Rural District	Shropshire
Wem Urban (town)	5,870	3.67	North Shropshire Rural District	Shropshire
Wentnor	346	32.91	Clun and Bishop's Castle Rural District	Shropshire
West Felton	1,475	24.53	Oswestry Rural District	Shropshire
Westbury	1,352	39.03	Atcham Rural District	Shropshire
Weston Rhyn	2,850	10.34	Oswestry Rural District	Shropshire
Weston-under-Redcastle	285	9.07	North Shropshire Rural District	Shropshire
Wheathill	229	12.00	Ludlow Rural District	Shropshire
Whitchurch Rural	1,533	35.61	North Shropshire Rural District	Shropshire
Whitchurch Urban (town)	9,871	23.81	North Shropshire Rural District	Shropshire
Whittington	2,592	24.34	Oswestry Rural District	Shropshire
Whitton	239	9.84	Ludlow Rural District	Shropshire
Whixall	795	13.74	North Shropshire Rural District	Shropshire
Wistanstow	812	21.63	Ludlow Rural District	Shropshire
Withington	227	4.62	Atcham Rural District	Shropshire
Woolstaston			Atcham Rural District	Shropshire
Woore	1,069	16.00	Market Drayton Rural District	Shropshire
Worfield	2,242	47.60	Bridgnorth Rural District	Shropshire
Worthen with Shelve	2,078	68.96	Clun and Bishop's Castle Rural District	Shropshire
Wrockwardine Wood and Trench	5,440	2.52	Oakengates Urban District	Telford and Wrekin
Wrockwardine	3,838	22.92	Wellington Rural District	Telford and Wrekin
Wroxeter and Uppington	382	27.01	Atcham Rural District	Shropshire

== See also ==
- List of civil parishes in England
- Category:Former civil parishes in Shropshire
