= List of electoral wards in Shropshire =

This is a list of electoral divisions and wards in the ceremonial county of Shropshire in the West Midlands. All changes since the re-organisation of local government following the passing of the Local Government Act 1972 are shown. The number of councillors elected for each electoral division or ward is shown in brackets.

== County council ==
=== Shropshire ===
Electoral Divisions from 1 April 1974 (first election 12 April 1973) to 7 May 1981:

1. Albrighton (1)
2. Baschurch (1)
3. Bishops Castle & Chirbury (1)
4. Bridgnorth (2)
5. Broseley (1)
6. Chelmarsh (1)
7. Church Stretton (1)
8. Clee Hill & Corvedale (1)
9. Cleobury Mortimer (1)
10. Clun & Lydbury (1)
11. Condover (1)
12. Dawley Magna (1)
13. Donnington (1)
14. Drayton (1)
15. Ellesmere (1)
16. Ford (1)
17. Hadley (1)
18. High Ercall (1)
19. Highley (1)
20. Hinstock (1)
21. Hodnet (1)
22. Lilleshall (1)
23. Ludlow (1)
24. Madeley (2)
25. Malinsee (1)
26. Montford (1)
27. Morfe (1)
28. Much Wenlock (1)
29. Newport (2)
30. Oswestry (Eastern) (1)
31. Oswestry (Western) (1)
32. Pontesbury (1)
33. Prees (1)
34. Ruyton-XI-Towns (1)
35. Shawbury (1)
36. Shifnal (1)
37. Shrewsbury (Abbey) (1)
38. Shrewsbury (Battlefield & Harlescott (2)
39. Shrewsbury (Belle Vue) (2)
40. Shrewsbury (Castle) (1)
41. Shrewsbury (Ditherington) (1)
42. Shrewsbury (Kingsland) (1)
43. Shrewsbury (Monkmoor) (1)
44. Shrewsbury (Welsh) (1)
45. St Oswald (1)
46. Teme (1)
47. Wellington (Haygate) (1)
48. Wellington (Park) (2)
49. Wem (1)
50. Weston Rhyn (1)
51. Whitchurch (1)
52. Whittington (1)
53. Wombridge (2)
54. Wrekin (1)
55. Wrockwardine Wood (1)
56. Wroxeter (1)

Electoral Divisions from 7 May 1981 to 5 May 2005:

1. Albrighton (1)
2. Bagley (1)
3. Bayston Hill (1)
4. Belle Vue (1)
5. Bishops Castle (1)
6. Bridgnorth Rural (1)
7. Bridgnorth Town (1)
8. Brookside (1); electoral division abolished in 1998
9. Broseley (1)
10. Burnell (1)
11. Castlefields & Ditherington (1)
12. Church Stretton (1)
13. Clee Hill (1)
14. Clun (1)
15. College (1); electoral division abolished in 1998
16. Copthorne (1)
17. Corvedale (1)
18. Cuckoo Oak (1); electoral division abolished in 1998
19. Dawley Magna (1); electoral division abolished in 1998
20. Donnington (1); electoral division abolished in 1998
21. Dothill (1); electoral division abolished in 1998
22. Edgmond (1); electoral division abolished in 1998
23. Ellesmere (1)
24. Hadley (1); electoral division abolished in 1998
25. Harlescott (1)
26. Haygate (1); electoral division abolished in 1998
27. Hodnet (1)
28. Hollinswood (1); electoral division abolished in 1998
29. Ketley (1); electoral division abolished in 1998
30. Lawley (1); electoral division abolished in 1998
31. Lilleshall (1); electoral division abolished in 1998
32. Loton (1)
33. Ludlow (1)
34. Madeley (1); electoral division abolished in 1998
35. Market Drayton (1)
36. Meole Brace (1)
37. Monkmoor (1)
38. Morfe (1)
39. Much Wenlock (1)
40. Myddle (1)
41. Newport North (1); electoral division abolished in 1998
42. Newport South (1); electoral division abolished in 1998
43. Oswestry East (1)
44. Oswestry West (1)
45. Prees (1)
46. Priorslee (1); electoral division abolished in 1998
47. Quarry (1)
48. Rea Valley (1)
49. Ruyton-XI-Towns (1)
50. Shifnal (1)
51. St Oswald (1)
52. Stirchley (1); electoral division abolished in 1998
53. Stottesdon (1)
54. Sundorne (1)
55. Sutton (1)
56. Tern (1)
57. Underdale (1)
58. Wem (1)
59. Weston Rhyn (1)
60. Whitchurch (1)
61. Whittington (1)
62. Wombridge (1); electoral division abolished in 1998
63. Woodside (1); electoral division abolished in 1998
64. Woore (1)
65. Wrekin Rural (1); electoral division abolished in 1998
66. Wrockwardine Wood (1); electoral division abolished in 1998

Electoral Divisions from 5 May 2005 to 4 June 2009:

1. Albrighton (1)
2. Bagley (1)
3. Baschurch (1)
4. Bayston Hill (1)
5. Belle-Vue (1)
6. Bishop’s Castle (1)
7. Bridgnorth East (1)
8. Bridgnorth Rural (1)
9. Bridgnorth West (1)
10. Broseley (1)
11. Burnell (1)
12. Castlefields & Ditherington (1)
13. Church Stretton (1)
14. Clee (1)
15. Clun (1)
16. Copthorne (1)
17. Corvedale (1)
18. Ellesmere (1)
19. Harlescott (1)
20. Loton (1)
21. Ludlow (1)
22. Ludlow Rural (1)
23. Market Drayton (2)
24. Market Drayton Rural (1)
25. Meole-Brace (1)
26. Monkmoor (1)
27. Morfe (1)
28. Much Wenlock (1)
29. Oswestry (2)
30. Porthill (1)
31. Prees (1)
32. Rea Valley (1)
33. Ruyton-XI-Towns (1)
34. Shawbury (1)
35. Shifnal (1)
36. St Oswald (1)
37. Stottesdon (1)
38. Sundorne (1)
39. Sutton & Reabrook (1)
40. Tern (1)
41. Underdale (1)
42. Wem (1)
43. Wem Rural (1)
44. Weston Rhyn (1)
45. Whitchurch (1)
46. Whittington (1)

Electoral Divisions from 4 June 2009 to 1 May 2025:

1. Abbey (1)
2. Albrighton (1)
3. Alveley & Claverley (1)
4. Bagley (1)
5. Battlefield (1)
6. Bayston Hill, Column & Sutton (3)
7. Belle Vue (1)
8. Bishop’s Castle (1)
9. Bowbrook (1)
10. Bridgnorth East & Astley Abbotts (2)
11. Bridgnorth West & Tasley (2)
12. Broseley (1)
13. Brown Clee (1)
14. Burnell (1)
15. Castlefields & Ditherington (1)
16. Cheswardine (1)
17. Chirbury & Worthen (1)
18. Church Stretton & Craven Arms (2)
19. Clee (1)
20. Cleobury Mortimer (2)
21. Clun (1)
22. Copthorne (1)
23. Corvedale (1)
24. Ellesmere Urban (1)
25. Harlescott (1)
26. Highley (1)
27. Hodnet (1)
28. Llanymynech (1)
29. Longden (1)
30. Loton (1)
31. Ludlow East (1)
32. Ludlow North (1)
33. Ludlow South (1)
34. Market Drayton East (1)
35. Market Drayton West (2)
36. Meole (1)
37. Minsterley (1); renamed Rea Valley in 2010
38. Monkmoor (1)
39. Much Wenlock (1)
40. Oswestry East (2) †
41. Oswestry South (1) †
42. Oswestry West (1) †
43. Porthill (1)
44. Prees (1)
45. Quarry & Coton Hill (1)
46. Radbrook (1)
47. Ruyton & Baschurch (1) †
48. Selattyn & Gobowen (2); renamed Gobowen, Selattyn & Weston Rhyn in 2011 †
49. Severn Valley (1)
50. Shawbury (1)
51. Shifnal North (1)
52. Shifnal South & Cosford (1)
53. St Martin’s (1)
54. St Oswald (1) †
55. Sundorne (1)
56. Tern (1)
57. The Meres (1)
58. Underdale (1)
59. Wem (2)
60. Whitchurch North (2)
61. Whitchurch South (1)
62. Whittington (1) †
63. Worfield (1)

† minor boundary changes in 2013

Electoral Divisions from 1 May 2025 to present:

1. Abbey (1)
2. Albrighton (1)
3. Bagley (1)
4. Battlefield (1)
5. Bayston Hill (1)
6. Belle Vue (1)
7. Bicton Heath (1)
8. Bishop’s Castle (1)
9. Bridgnorth Castle (1)
10. Bridgnorth East (1)
11. Bridgnorth South & Alveley (1)
12. Bridgnorth West & Tasley (1)
13. Broseley (1)
14. Brown Clee (1)
15. Burnell (1)
16. Castlefields & Ditherington (1)
17. Cheswardine (1)
18. Chirbury & Worthen (1)
19. Claverley & Worfield (1)
20. Clee (1)
21. Cleobury Mortimer (1)
22. Clun (1)
23. Column & Sutton (1)
24. Copthorne (1)
25. Corvedale (1)
26. Craven Arms (1)
27. Ellesmere Urban (1)
28. Harlescott (1)
29. Highley (1)
30. Hodnet (1)
31. Llanymynech (1)
32. Longden (1)
33. Loton (1)
34. Ludlow East (1)
35. Ludlow North (1)
36. Ludlow South (1)
37. Market Drayton East & Rural (1)
38. Market Drayton North (1)
39. Market Drayton South (1)
40. Meole (1)
41. Monkmoor (1)
42. Much Wenlock (1)
43. Oswestry North (1)
44. Oswestry North East (1)
45. Oswestry South (1)
46. Oswestry South East (1)
47. Oteley & Reabrook (1)
48. Porthill (1)
49. Prees (1)
50. Quarry & Coton Hill (1)
51. Radbrook (1)
52. Rea Valley (1)
53. Ruyton & Baschurch (1)
54. Selattyn & Gobowen (1)
55. Severn Valley (1)
56. Shawbury (1)
57. Shifnal North (1)
58. Shifnal Rural (1)
59. Shifnal South (1)
60. St Martin’s (2)
61. St Oswald (1)
62. Stottesdon, Kinlet & Hopton Wafers (1)
63. Sundorne & Old Heath (1)
64. Tern (1)
65. The Meres (1)
66. The Strettons (1)
67. Underdale (1)
68. Wem (2)
69. Whitchurch North (1)
70. Whitchurch South (1)
71. Whitchurch West (1)
72. Whittington (1)

== Unitary authority council ==
=== Telford and Wrekin ===
Wards from 1 April 1974 (first election 7 June 1973) to 3 May 1979:

Wards from 3 May 1979 to 1 May 1997:

Wards from 1 May 1997 to 1 May 2003:

1. Arleston (1)
2. Brookside (2)
3. Church Aston & Lilleshall (1)
4. College (1)
5. Cuckoo Oak (2)
6. Dawley Magna (3)
7. Donnington (2)
8. Donnington Wood & Muxton (2)
9. Dothill (1)
10. Edgmond (1)
11. Ercall (1)
12. Ercall Magna (1)
13. Hadley (2)
14. Haygate (1)
15. Hollinswood & Randlay (2)
16. Ironbridge Gorge (1)
17. Ketley (1)
18. Ketley Bank (1)
19. Lawley (2)
20. Leegomery (2)
21. Madeley (2)
22. Malinslee & Langley (3)
23. Newport East (1)
24. Newport North (1)
25. Newport South (1)
26. Newport West (1)
27. Park (1)
28. Shawbirch (1)
29. St George’s & Priorslee (3)
30. Stirchley (2)
31. Wombridge (2)
32. Woodside (2)
33. Wrockwardine (2)
34. Wrockwardine Wood (2)

Wards from 1 May 2003 to 7 May 2015:

1. Apley Castle (1)
2. Arleston (1)
3. Brookside (2)
4. Church Aston & Lilleshall (1)
5. College (1)
6. Cuckoo Oak (2)
7. Dawley Magna (3)
8. Donnington (2)
9. Dothill (1)
10. Edgmond (1)
11. Ercall (1)
12. Ercall Magna (1)
13. Hadley & Leegomery (3)
14. Haygate (1)
15. Horsehay & Lightmoor (2)
16. Ironbridge Gorge (1)
17. Ketley & Oakengates (3)
18. Lawley & Overdale (2)
19. Madeley (2)
20. Malinslee (2)
21. Muxton (2)
22. Newport East (1)
23. Newport North (1)
24. Newport South (1)
25. Newport West (1)
26. Park (1)
27. Priorslee (2)
28. Shawbirch (1)
29. St Georges (2)
30. The Nedge (3)
31. Woodside (2)
32. Wrockwardine (2)
33. Wrockwardine Wood & Trench (2)

Wards from 7 May 2015 to 4 May 2023:

1. Admaston & Bratton (1)
2. Apley Castle (1)
3. Arleston (1)
4. Brookside (2)
5. Church Aston & Lilleshall (1)
6. College (1)
7. Dawley & Aqueduct (3)
8. Donnington (2)
9. Dothill (1)
10. Edgmond & Ercall Magna (2)
11. Ercall (1)
12. Hadley & Leegomery (3)
13. Haygate (1)
14. Horsehay & Lightmoor (2)
15. Ironbridge Gorge (1)
16. Ketley & Overdale (3)
17. Madeley & Sutton Hill (3)
18. Malinslee & Dawley Bank (2)
19. Muxton (2)
20. Newport North & West (2)
21. Newport South & East (2)
22. Oakengates & Ketley Bank (3)
23. Park (1)
24. Priorslee (2)
25. Shawbirch (1)
26. St Georges (2)
27. The Nedge (3)
28. Woodside (2)
29. Wrockwardine (1)
30. Wrockwardine Wood & Trench (2)

Wards from 4 May 2023 to present:

1. Admaston & Bratton (1)
2. Apley Castle (1)
3. Arleston & College (2)
4. Brookside (1)
5. Church Aston & Lilleshall (1)
6. Dawley & Aqueduct (2)
7. Donnington (2)
8. Edgmond (1)
9. Ercall (1)
10. Ercall Magna (1)
11. Hadley & Leegomery (3)
12. Haygate & Park (2)
13. Horsehay & Lightmoor (2)
14. Ironbridge Gorge (1)
15. Ketley (1)
16. Lawley (3)
17. Madeley & Sutton Hill (3)
18. Malinslee & Dawley Bank (2)
19. Muxton (2)
20. Newport East (1)
21. Newport North (1)
22. Newport South (1)
23. Newport West (1)
24. Oakengates & Ketley Bank (3)
25. Overdale & The Rock (1)
26. Priorslee (2)
27. Shawbirch & Dothill (2)
28. St Georges (2)
29. The Nedge (3)
30. Woodside (2)
31. Wrockwardine (1)
32. Wrockwardine Wood & Trench (2)

== Former district councils ==
=== Bridgnorth ===
Wards from 1 April 1974 (first election 7 June 1973) to 3 May 1979:

Wards from 3 May 1979 to 1 May 2003:

Wards from 1 May 2003 to 1 April 2009 (district abolished):

1. Albrighton South (2)
2. Alveley (2)
3. Bridgnorth Castle (2)
4. Bridgnorth East (2)
5. Bridgnorth Morfe (2)
6. Bridgnorth West (2)
7. Broseley East (2)
8. Broseley West (2)
9. Claverley (1)
10. Ditton Priors (1)
11. Donington & Albrighton North (2)
12. Glazeley (1)
13. Harrington (1)
14. Highley (2)
15. Morville (1)
16. Much Wenlock (2)
17. Shifnall Idsall (2)
18. Shifnal Manor (2)
19. Shifnal Rural (1)
20. Stottesdon (1)
21. Worfield (1)

=== North Shropshire ===
Wards from 1 April 1974 (first election 7 June 1973) to 6 May 1976:

Wards from 6 May 1976 to 1 May 2003:

Wards from 1 May 2003 to 1 April 2009 (district abolished):

1. Baschurch (1)
2. Clive & Myddle (2)
3. Cockshutt (1)
4. Dudleston Heath (1)
5. Ellesmere & Welshampton (3)
6. Hinstock (2)
7. Hodnet (2)
8. Hordley, Tetchill & Lyneal (1)
9. Market Drayton East (2)
10. Market Drayton North (3)
11. Market Drayton South (2)
12. Prees (2)
13. Shavington (1)
14. Shawbury (2)
15. Sutton (1)
16. Wem East (2)
17. Wem Rural (1)
18. Wem West (2)
19. Whitchurch North (2)
20. Whitchurch Rural (1)
21. Whitchurch South (2)
22. Whitchurch West (2)
23. Whixhall (1)
24. Woore (1)

=== Oswestry ===
Wards from 1 April 1974 (first election 7 June 1973) to 6 May 1976:

Wards from 6 May 1976 to 1 May 2003:

Wards from 1 May 2003 to 1 April 2009 (district abolished):

1. Cabin Lane (2)
2. Cambrian (2)
3. Carreg Llwyd (2)
4. Castle (2)
5. Gatacre (2)
6. Gobowen (3)
7. Kinnerley (1)
8. Llanyblodwel & Pant (2)
9. Maserfield (2)
10. Ruyton & West Felton (2)
11. St Martin's (2)
12. Sweeney & Trefonen (3)
13. Weston Rhyn (2)
14. Whittington (2)

=== Shrewsbury and Atcham ===
Wards from 1 April 1974 (first election 7 June 1973) to 6 May 1976:

Wards from 6 May 1976 to 2 May 2002:

Wards from 2 May 2002 to 1 April 2009 (district abolished):

1. Bagley (2)
2. Battlefield & Heathgates (2)
3. Bayston Hill (2)
4. Belle Vue (2)
5. Bowbrook (2)
6. Castlefields & Quarry (2)
7. Column (2)
8. Condover (1)
9. Copthorne (2)
10. Hanwood & Longden (1)
11. Harlescott (2)
12. Haughmond & Attingham (1)
13. Lawley (1)
14. Meole Brace (2)
15. Monkmoor (2)
16. Montford (1)
17. Pimhill (1)
18. Porthill (2)
19. Rea Valley (2)
20. Rowton (1)
21. Severn Valley (1)
22. Sundorne (2)
23. Sutton & Reabrook (2)
24. Underdale (2)

=== South Shropshire ===
Wards from 1 April 1974 (first election 7 June 1973) to 6 May 1976:

Wards from 6 May 1976 to 1 May 2003:

Wards from 1 May 2003 to 1 April 2009 (district abolished):

1. Apedale (1)
2. Bishop’s Castle with Onny Valley (2)
3. Bitterley with Stoke St Milborough (1)
4. Bucknell (1)
5. Burford (1)
6. Caynham with Ashford (1)
7. Chirbury (1)
8. Church Stretton North (2)
9. Church Stretton South (2)
10. Clee (2)
11. Cleobury Mortimer (2)
12. Clun (1)
13. Clun Forest (1)
14. Corve Valley (1)
15. Kemp Valley (1)
16. Ludlow Henley (2)
17. Ludlow St Laurence's (2)
18. Ludlow St Peter's (2)
19. Ludlow Sheet with Ludford (2)
20. Stokesay (2)
21. Upper Corvedale (1)
22. Wistanstow with Hopesay (1)
23. Worthen (2)

== Electoral wards by constituency ==
Wards as they existed on 1 December 2020.

=== North Shropshire ===
Shropshire: Ellesmere Urban; Gobowen, Selattyn & Weston Rhyn; Llanymynech; Market Drayton East; Market Drayton West; Oswestry East; Oswestry South; Oswestry West; Prees; Ruyton and Baschurch; St. Martin’s; St. Oswald; Shawbury; The Meres; Wem; Whitchurch North; Whitchurch South; Whittington.

=== Shrewsbury ===
Shropshire: Abbey; Bagley; Battlefield; Bayston Hill, Column & Sutton; Belle Vue; Bowbrook; Castlefields & Ditherington; Copthorne; Harlescott; Longden; Loton; Meole; Monkmoor; Porthill; Quarry & Coton Hill; Radbrook; Rea Valley; Sundorne; Tern; Underdale.

=== South Shropshire ===
Shropshire: Alveley & Claverley; Bishop’s Castle; Bridgnorth East & Astley Abbotts; Bridgnorth West & Tasley; Broseley; Brown Clee; Burnell; Chirbury & Worthen; Church Stretton & Craven Arms; Clee; Cleobury Mortimer; Clun; Corvedale; Highley; Ludlow East;Ludlow North; Ludlow South; Much Wenlock; Severn Valley; Worfield.

=== Telford ===
Telford and Wrekin: Brookside; Dawley & Aqueduct; Horsehay & Lightmoor; Ironbridge Gorge; Ketley & Overdale; Madeley & Sutton Hill; Malinslee & Dawley Bank; Oakengates & Ketley Bank; Priorslee; St. Georges; The Nedge; Woodside; Wrockwardine Wood & Trench.

=== The Wrekin ===
Shropshire: Albrighton; Cheswardine; Hodnet; Shifnal North; Shifnal South & Cosford.

Telford and Wrekin: Admaston & Bratton; Apley Castle; Arleston; Church Aston & Lilleshall; College; Donnington; Dothill; Edgmond & Ercall Magna; Ercall; Hadley & Leegomery; Haygate; Muxton; Newport North & West; Newport South & East; Park; Shawbirch; Wrockwardine.

== See also ==
- Parliamentary constituencies in Shropshire
