= South Shropshire =

Former local government district in England

Coordinates: 52.495°N 2.816°W

South Shropshire District
- Shown within Shropshire
- History
  - Origin: Clun and Bishop's Castle Rural District; Ludlow Rural District
  - Created: 1 April 1974
  - Abolished: 31 March 2009
  - Succeeded by: Shropshire
- Status: District
- ONS code: 39UF
- Government: South Shropshire District Council
  - HQ: Ludlow

South Shropshire was a local government district in Shropshire, England, from 1974 to 2009. Its council was based in the town of Ludlow; the other towns in the district were Church Stretton, Cleobury Mortimer, Clun, Bishop's Castle and Craven Arms.

South Shropshire was the most rural district of one of the UK's most rural counties, the population of the district was 40,410 in 2001 spread out over 1,027 km^{2} of forest, mountains, moorlands, hills and mixed quality farmland. It bordered the unitary authority of Powys in Wales, which it closely resembled, economically, socially, culturally and historically. 65% of the district's area is part of the Shropshire Hills Area of Outstanding Natural Beauty.

The district was created on 1 April 1974, under the Local Government Act 1972, by the merger of the rural districts of Clun and Bishop's Castle and Ludlow.

The district and its council were abolished on 1 April 2009 when the new Shropshire unitary authority was established, as part of the 2009 structural changes to local government in England.

== History ==
South Shropshire had many ancient monuments, with Mitchells Fold on the Welsh border being the most notable, and there is evidence of Neolithic quarrying in the Apedale. The area seems to have been settled by the Ordovices, an Iron Age tribe of people in the last millennium BC, and was a stronghold of the Celtic chieftain Caractacus (Caer Caradoc is said to be named after him). The area was probably part of the "Military" division of the Roman occupation and locals claim that the Romans mined lead in the north west of the district.

In the Early Middle Ages, the area was a battleground between the Welsh and the Anglo Saxon Kingdom of Mercia and Offa's Dyke, which is partially in the district, is a permanent reminder of the areas border status. In the Middle Ages, South Shropshire was part of the Welsh Marches, a lawless area ruled by tyrannical feudal lords, who as Marcher Lords had de facto independence from the King of England.

During the English Civil War the area was generally spared from fighting, although there was a small massacre at Hopton Castle and Ludlow Castle was captured by Parliamentary troops.

During the Industrial Revolution, coal was mined around Clee Hill and lead was mined near the border with Wales, e.g. at Snailbeach. Church Stretton was a centre of textile manufacture and Ludlow thrived on the malting trade, while the rest of the area was populated by smallholders. The economy of the area was fragile, and most industry in the area had collapsed by 1900.

The administrative area of South Shropshire was created on 1 April 1974 under the Local Government Act 1972 as one of six non-metropolitan districts within Shropshire. It covered the area of two former districts:

- Clun and Bishop's Castle Rural District (which included the rural borough of Bishop's Castle)
- Ludlow Rural District (which included the rural borough of Ludlow)

The district and its council were abolished as part of the 2009 structural changes to local government in England. The council's functions were taken over from 1 April 2009 by Shropshire County Council, which was renamed Shropshire Council at the same time.

== Geography ==
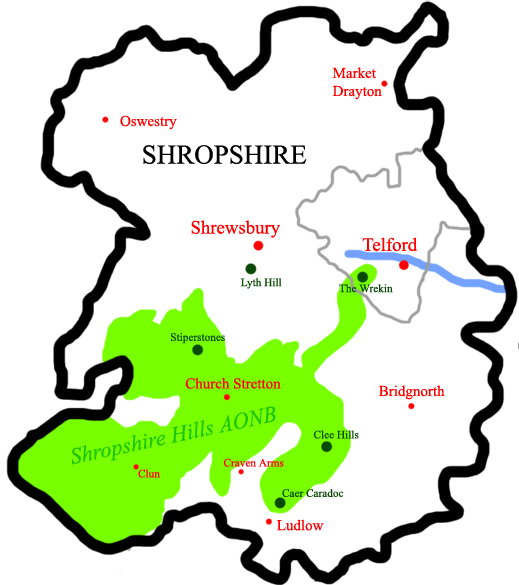
The AONB is highlighted in green

The District of South Shropshire covered an area of 1,028 square kilometres, or 397 square miles (1,030 km^{2}), which was roughly one third of the administrative county of Shropshire as of 2008.

South Shropshire included mountains, valleys, hills, moors, forests and low grade farmland. The landscape is often rugged, with crags and rock outcrops very common, especially in the west and around the Clee Hills, and was for the most part gouged by glaciers during the ice age. The area's many rock types made it particularly interesting to geologists, with Wenlock Edge being especially noteworthy.

The Shropshire Hills AONB (Area of Outstanding Natural Beauty) covered much of the district, reflecting the natural geography of the area.

=== Parishes ===
Map of civil parishes in South Shropshire

The district contained the following civil parishes:

- Abdon, Acton Scott, Ashford Bowdler, Ashford Carbonell
- Bedstone, Bettws-y-Crwyn, Bishop's Castle, Bitterley, Boraston, Bromfield, Bucknell, Burford
- Caynham, Chirbury with Brompton, Church Stretton, Clee St. Margaret, Cleobury Mortimer, Clun, Clunbury, Clungunford, Colebatch, Coreley, Craven Arms, Culmington
- Diddlebury
- Eaton-under-Heywood, Edgton
- Greete
- Heath, Hope Bagot, Hope Bowdler, Hopesay, Hopton Cangeford, Hopton Castle, Hopton Wafers
- Llanfair Waterdine, Ludford, Ludlow, Lydbury North, Lydham
- Mainstone, Milson, More, Munslow, Myndtown
- Nash, Neen Sollars, Newcastle on Clun, Norbury
- Onibury
- Ratlinghope, Richard's Castle, Rushbury
- Sibdon Carwood, Stanton Lacy, Stoke St. Milborough, Stowe
- Wentnor, Wheathill, Whitton, Wistanstow, Worthen with Shelve

== Economics and demographics ==
Economically the district was largely dependent on tourism, partly due to the decline in the economic significance of farming and also the decline and subsequent end of local lead and coal mining industry. In addition to tourism, some light industry did exist in the district, in the Church Stretton and Ludlow areas, and in Burford, near Tenbury Wells.

Additionally, the local demographics show a large economic gap between affluent residents and poorer communities. Many of the affluent residents have moved into the area from other places, such as South East England on their retirement. This continues an older trend whose root was initially in the imbalance of wealth associated with the farming economy previously prevalent in the area.

Historical population
Year	Pop.	±%
1801	28,871	—
1811	31,731	+9.9%
1821	34,248	+7.9%
1831	36,961	+7.9%
1841	37,533	+1.5%
1851	37,334	−0.5%
1861	38,520	+3.2%
1871	39,705	+3.1%
1881	40,890	+3.0%
1891	38,131	−6.7%
1901	37,555	−1.5%
1911	36,989	−1.5%
1921	35,713	−3.4%
1931	34,481	−3.4%
1941	34,241	−0.7%
1951	34,003	−0.7%
1961	33,184	−2.4%
1971	32,284	−2.7%
1981	33,426	+3.5%
1991	38,586	+15.4%
2001	40,389	+4.7%
Population figures for South Shropshire. Source:

=== Energy policy ===
In May 2006, a report commissioned by British Gas showed that housing in South Shropshire produced the 13th highest average carbon emissions in the country at 7,156 kg of carbon dioxide per dwelling.

== Governance ==
=== Political control ===
The first elections to the council were held in 1973, initially operating as a shadow authority until the new arrangements came into effect on 1 April 1974. Political control of the council from 1974 until its abolition in 2009 was as follows:

Party in control	Years
Independent	1974–2003
No overall control	2003–2007
Conservative	2007–2009

=== Leadership ===
The leaders of the council from 2003 until its abolition in 2009 were:

Councillor	Party	From	To
Heather Kidd	Liberal Democrats	2003	2007
Cecilia Motley	Conservative	2007	31 March 2009

=== Premises ===
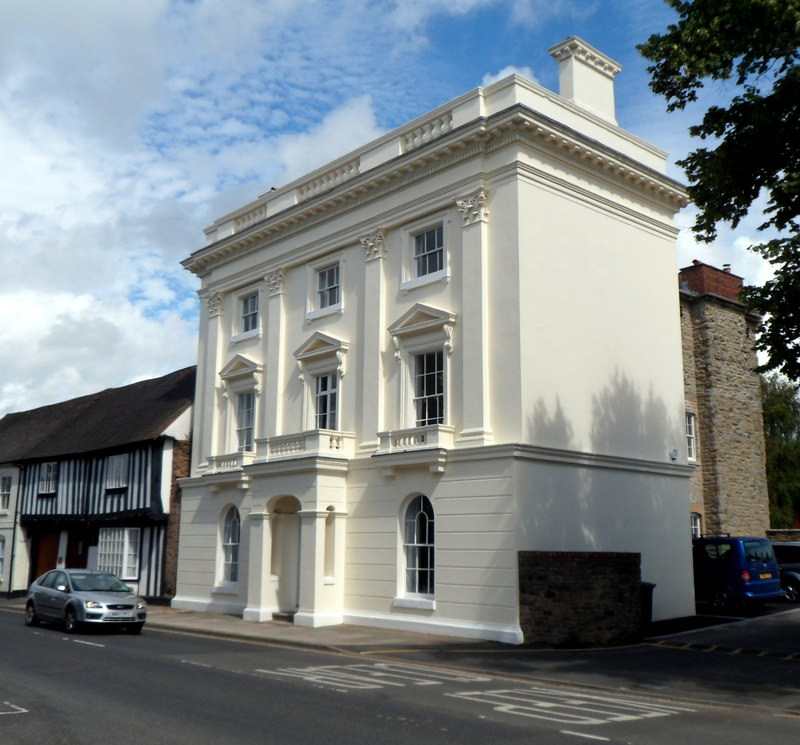
Council's headquarters: Stone House, Corve Street, Ludlow

The council was based at Stone House on Corve Street in Ludlow, a converted late 18th century house which had served as the headquarters of Ludlow Rural District Council, one of South Shropshire District Council's predecessors, since 1946. On the council's abolition in 2009, the building passed to Shropshire Council, which closed it in 2014 and it was subsequently sold.

== Council elections ==
- 1973 South Shropshire District Council election
- 1976 South Shropshire District Council election (New ward boundaries)
- 1979 South Shropshire District Council election
- 1983 South Shropshire District Council election
- 1987 South Shropshire District Council election (District boundary changes took place but the number of seats remained the same)
- 1991 South Shropshire District Council election
- 1995 South Shropshire District Council election
- 1999 South Shropshire District Council election
- 2003 South Shropshire District Council election (New ward boundaries)
- 2007 South Shropshire District Council election

=== Results maps ===
2003 results map

2007 results map

=== By-election results ===
Bishops Castle By-Election 16 January 1997
Party	Candidate	Votes	%	±%
Independent		579	74.4	
Liberal Democrats		177	22.8	
Labour		22	2.8	
Majority		402	51.6	
Turnout		778	50.5	
Independent hold		Swing		

Ludlow East Hamlet By-Election 31 July 1997
Party	Candidate	Votes	%	±%
Independent		236	38.5	+38.5
Green		201	32.8	+15.0
Liberal Democrats		176	28.7	−25.4
Majority		35	5.7	
Turnout		613	21.4	
Independent gain from Liberal Democrats		Swing		

Ludlow Castle By-Election 28 September 2000
Party	Candidate	Votes	%	±%
Liberal Democrats		342	45.4	+14.4
Conservative		273	36.3	+36.3
Independent		138	18.3	−5.1
Majority		69	9.1	
Turnout		753	30.3	
Liberal Democrats gain from Independent		Swing		

Ludlow Castle By-Election 15 November 2001
Party	Candidate	Votes	%	±%
Conservative		546	50.9	+50.9
Liberal Democrats		526	49.1	+16.3
Majority		20	1.8	
Turnout		1,072	43.1	
Conservative gain from Green		Swing		

Worthen By-Election 21 February 2002
Party	Candidate	Votes	%	±%
Liberal Democrats		517	58.1	
Conservative		373	41.9	
Majority		144	16.2	
Turnout		890	56.1	
Liberal Democrats gain from Independent		Swing		

Church Stretton North By-Election 7 July 2005
Party	Candidate	Votes	%	±%
Liberal Democrats	Charles West	637	71.5	+34.0
Conservative	Mark Wiggin	188	21.1	−6.7
Independent	Michael Whitehouse	66	7.4	+7.4
Majority		449	50.4	
Turnout		891	53.0	
Liberal Democrats hold		Swing		

St Peters By-Election 14 September 2006
Party	Candidate	Votes	%	±%
Liberal Democrats	Tracy Huffer	488	57.0	+4.1
Conservative		298	34.8	+9.4
Green		70	8.2	+8.2
Majority		190	12.2	
Turnout		856	44.1	
Liberal Democrats hold		Swing		
