= Burford Rural District =

Former rural district in England

Coordinates: 52.316°N 2.600°W

Burford was a rural district in Shropshire in England from 1894 to 1934.

It was formed under the Local Government Act 1894 that part of the Tenbury rural sanitary district which was in Shropshire (the bulk forming Tenbury Rural District in Worcestershire). It consisted of the parishes of Boraston, Burford, Greete, Nash and Whitton.

It was abolished in 1934 by a county review order made under the Local Government Act 1929, with its area being transferred to the Ludlow Rural District.
