= Shropshire North =

Shropshire North may refer to:

- Shropshire North (UK Parliament constituency), now named North Shropshire
- North Shropshire, a former local government district in England
