= Listed buildings in Whitton, Shropshire =

Whitton is a civil parish in Shropshire, England. It contains three listed buildings that are recorded in the National Heritage List for England. Of these, one is listed at Grade I, the highest of the three grades, one is at Grade II*, the middle grade, and the other is at Grade II, the lowest grade. The parish contains the village of Whitton and the surrounding area, and the listed buildings consist of a church, a churchyard cross, and a former manor house.

== Key ==
Grade	Criteria
I	Buildings of exceptional interest, sometimes considered to be internationally important
II*	Particularly important buildings of more than special interest
II	Buildings of national importance and special interest

== Buildings ==
Name and location	Photograph	Date	Notes	Grade
St Mary's Church; 52.35218°N 2.62411°W		12th century	The oldest parts of the church are the nave and the chancel, the tower was added in the 14th century, and the church was restored and the chancel was extended in 1892 by Aston Webb. The church is built in stone with a tile roof, and consists of a long nave and chancel in one cell, a south porch, a vestry and a west tower. The tower has a plain parapet and pyramidal roof, and contains a lancet windows and slit windows. There are Norman windows in the nave, and the south doorway is also Norman. The east window is in Decorated style.	II*
Churchyard cross 52.35210°N 2.62413°W		Medieval	The remains of the cross are in the churchyard of St Mary's Church. The cross is in sandstone, and consists of a truncated octagonal shaft on a circular plinth with a cusped ogee-headed niche, all on two circular steps.	II
Whitton Court; 52.35778°N 2.61988°W	—	Late 16th century	A manor house with an earlier core, it has been extended and was restored in about 1862 and in 1883. The house is partly in red brick with stone dressings on a stone plinth, partly timber framed with painted infill, and partly in stone, and the roofs are tiled with stone-coped gables. Initially it had a U-shaped plan, with a hall and cross-wings, and the extension has formed a square plan around a courtyard. There are two storeys, an attic and a cellar. The south front has two bays and flanking slightly projecting wings. The windows are mullioned and transomed, mullioned, or transomed.	I
