= Bridgnorth District =

Former non-metropolitan district in Shropshire, England

Coordinates: 52°32′03″N 2°25′06″W

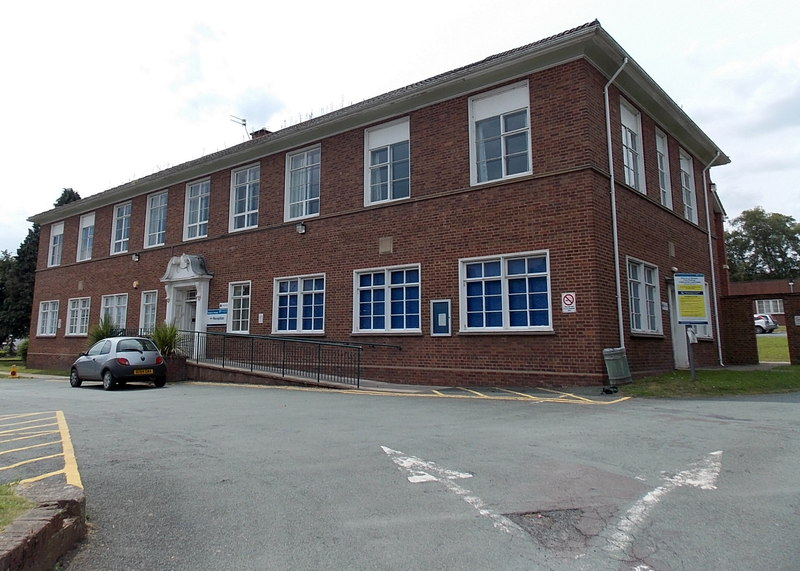
- Council Offices, Westgate, Bridgnorth

- Shown within Shropshire
- History
  - Origin: Bridgnorth Rural District; Much Wenlock Municipal Borough; Shifnal Rural District (part)
  - Created: 1 April 1974
  - Abolished: 31 March 2009
  - Succeeded by: Shropshire
- Status: District
- ONS code: 39UB
- Government: Bridgnorth District Council
  - HQ: Bridgnorth

Bridgnorth District was a local government district in Shropshire, England, from 1974 to 2009. Its council was based in the town of Bridgnorth. The district also included the towns of Much Wenlock, Shifnal and Broseley and the villages of Albrighton and Sheriffhales, as well as RAF Cosford.

== History ==
The district was formed on 1 April 1974, under the Local Government Act 1972. The district covered the former Bridgnorth Rural District, and nearly all of the Shifnal Rural District, excluding a small part of Shifnal parish within the area of Telford New Town, which went to Wrekin district. The former municipal boroughs of Much Wenlock and Bridgnorth had been converted into rural boroughs in 1966 and 1967 respectively, making them part of Bridgnorth Rural District whilst retaining some of their civic dignities such as the right to appoint a mayor.

The new district created in 1974 was administered by Bridgnorth District Council. The district and its council were abolished as part of the 2009 structural changes to local government in England. The council's functions were taken over from 1 April 2009 by Shropshire County Council, which was renamed Shropshire Council at the same time.

== Parishes ==
Map of civil parishes in Bridgnorth

The district contained the following civil parishes:

- Acton Round, Albrighton, Alveley, Astley Abbotts, Aston Botterell, Aston Eyre
- Badger, Barrow, Beckbury, Billingsley, Boningale, Bridgnorth, Broseley, Burwarton
- Chelmarsh, Chetton, Claverley, Cleobury North
- Deuxhill, Ditton Priors, Donington
- Eardington, Easthope
- Farlow
- Glazeley
- Highley
- Kemberton, Kinlet
- Middleton Scriven, Monkhopton, Morville, Much Wenlock
- Neen Savage, Neenton
- Quatt Malvern
- Romsley, Rudge, Ryton
- Sheriffhales, Shifnal, Shipton, Sidbury, Stanton Long, Stockton, Stottesdon, Sutton Maddock
- Tasley, Tong
- Upton Cressett
- Worfield

== Energy policy ==
In May 2006, a report commissioned by British Gas showed that housing in the district of Bridgnorth produced the 12th highest average carbon emissions in the country at 7,176 kg of carbon dioxide per dwelling.

== Governance ==
=== Political control ===
The first elections to the council were held in 1973, initially operating as a shadow authority until the new arrangements came into effect on 1 April 1974. Political control of the council from 1974 until its abolition in 2009 was as follows:

Party in control	Years
Independent	1974–2003
No overall control	2003–2009

=== Leadership ===
The last leader of the council was Elizabeth Yeomans, an independent.

Councillor	Party	From	To
Elizabeth Yeomans	Independent		31 Mar 2009

=== Premises ===
The council was based at the Council Offices on Westgate in Bridgnorth. It had been built in 1952 for the old Bridgnorth Rural District Council, one of the council's predecessors. On the council's abolition in 2009, the building passed to Shropshire Council, which closed it in 2014. The building was subsequently sold and demolished.

== Elections ==
- 1973 Bridgnorth District Council election
- 1976 Bridgnorth District Council election
- 1979 Bridgnorth District Council election (New ward boundaries)
- 1983 Bridgnorth District Council election
- 1987 Bridgnorth District Council election
- 1991 Bridgnorth District Council election (District boundary changes took place but the number of seats remained the same)
- 1995 Bridgnorth District Council election
- 1999 Bridgnorth District Council election
- 2003 Bridgnorth District Council election (New ward boundaries)
- 2007 Bridgnorth District Council election

=== Results maps ===
2003 results map

2007 results map

=== By-election results ===
Harrington By-Election 31 July 1997
Party	Candidate	Votes	%	±%
Liberal Democrats		126	51.9	+5.0
Conservative		117	48.2	+48.2
Majority		9	3.7	
Turnout		243	21.4	
Liberal Democrats gain from Independent		Swing		

Sheriffhales By-Election 20 June 2002
Party	Candidate	Votes	%	±%
Conservative		171	60.4	+60.4
Independent		112	39.6	−16.6
Majority		59	20.8	
Turnout		283	14.0	
Conservative gain from Independent		Swing		

Ditton Priors By-Election 14 July 2005
Party	Candidate	Votes	%	±%
Conservative		295	62.5	+11.9
Liberal Democrats		177	37.5	+37.5
Majority		118	25.0	
Turnout		472	36.0	
Conservative hold		Swing		
