= 2007 North Shropshire District Council election =

2007 English local election

Results of the 2007 North Shropshire District Council election

The 2007 North Shropshire District Council election took place to elect members to the District Council of North Shropshire, a local government district in Shropshire, England from 1974 to 2009.

== Results summary ==
Results summary
Party	Seats	Gains	Losses	Net +/-	Seats %	Votes	Votes%
Conservative	26				65	4787	49.5%
Independent	11				27.5	4244	43.9%
Labour	2				5	642	6.6%
Liberal Democrat	1				2.5	0	0.0%
