= Local Government Commission for Wales =

The Local Government Commission for Wales was established by the Local Government Act 1958 to review the organisation of local government in Wales and to make recommendations for its reform. It delivered its report in 1963 and was dissolved in 1967. Its recommendations were not carried out.

== Membership and terms of reference ==
The legislation establishing the commission set out its duties and powers: it was charged with "the duty of reviewing the organisation of local government" in Wales (including Monmouthshire) "and of making such proposals as are hereinafter authorised for effecting changes appearing... desirable in the interests of effective and convenient local government". The commission was to consist of "a chairman, a deputy chairman, and not more than five other members": at least one of whom was to be "a person able to speak the Welsh language".

Proposed changes to local government areas could be effected in five ways, used alone or in combination:

- The alteration of the area of an administrative county or county borough (including the abolition of any county district in the course of the extension of a county borough)
- The constitution of a new administrative county by the amalgamation of two or more areas, whether counties or county boroughs, or by the aggregation of parts of such areas or the separation of a part of such an area
- The constitution of a new county borough by the amalgamation of two or more boroughs (whether county or non-county), the conversion of a non-county borough or urban district into a county borough, or the division of an existing county borough into parts and the constitution of all or any of the parts a county borough
- The abolition of an administrative county or county borough and the distribution of its area among other areas, being counties or county boroughs
- The conversion of a county borough into a non-county borough and its inclusion in an administrative county

The commission was appointed by royal warrant dated 5 January 1959, with a membership of five. The chairman was Sir Guildhaume Myrddin-Evans, and Deputy-Chairman was Sir David Emrys Evans. The remaining members were William Jones, Professor Charles Edward Gittins and Janet Morgan.

== Review areas ==
For the purposes of the commission's work Wales was divided into three review areas:

- West and Mid Wales Review Area: the administrative counties of Breconshire, Cardiganshire, Carmarthenshire, Pembrokeshire and Radnorshire:- review commenced 5 May 1959
- Glamorgan and Monmouthshire Review Area: the administrative counties of Glamorgan and Monmouthshire, and the county boroughs of Cardiff, Merthyr Tydfil, Newport and Swansea: - review commenced 5 May 1959
- North Wales Review Area: the administrative counties of Anglesey, Caernarvonshire, Denbighshire, Flintshire, Merioneth and Montgomeryshire: - review commenced 28 March 1960

The commission submitted their draft proposals in May 1961 and made the final report in March 1963.

== Recommendations ==
The commission recommended the following:

- A reduction in the number of administrative counties from 13 to 7
- Extensions of the county boroughs of Cardiff, Newport and Swansea
- The county borough of Merthyr Tydfil to become a non-county borough in Glamorgan

The commission rejected the constitution of the boroughs of Rhondda and Wrexham as county boroughs.

The proposals set out in the report were not accepted by the government, and, following the establishment of an inter-departmental working group in 1965, a white paper was issued in 1967. This incorporated some of the 1963 proposals and included some innovations.

The local government system envisaged in the White Paper comprised:

- 5 "administrative areas" replacing the 13 administrative counties:
  - North West Wales county (Anglesey, Caernarvonshire, Merionethshire)
  - North East Wales county (Denbighshire, Flintshire, Montgomeryshire)
  - South West Wales county (Cardiganshire, Carmarthenshire, Pembrokeshire)
  - Glamorgan (Glamorgan, Merthyr Tydfil county borough)
  - South East Wales county (Breconshire, Monmouthshire, Radnorshire)
- The administrative areas divided into 36 districts
- The county boroughs of Cardiff, Newport and Swansea to continue
- "Common Councils" and a "Welsh Council" for the administration of joint services

While the new areas were to be based on existing administrative counties, there were to be slight boundary changes: the largest being the readjustment of the Caernarvonshire/Denbighshire boundary between North East and North West Wales counties, the inclusion of the Edeyrnion area of Merionethshire in North East Wales, and much of southern Breconshire (or Brecknockshire) passing to Glamorgan.

On 26 February 1964, the Minister of Housing and Local Government and Minister for Welsh Affairs, Sir Keith Joseph, indicated in the House of Commons that the government did not intend to implement the commission's proposals. He stated that while there was an urgent need for reform, the government wished to reconsider the pattern of local government with the possibility of issuing a white paper leading to legislation in the future.

Local government in Wales remained unchanged until the implementation of the Local Government Act 1972 in 1974, which created a two-tier system of counties and districts throughout the principality. Two of the counties created in 1974, Dyfed and Gwynedd closely resembled the South West and North West Wales areas.
