= Market Drayton Rural District =

Former rural district in Shropshire, England

Coordinates: 52.904°N 2.484°W

Drayton or Market Drayton was a rural district in Shropshire, England from 1894 to 1974. It was created by the Local Government Act 1894 under the name 'Drayton', from that part of the Market Drayton rural sanitary district which was in Shropshire (the rest forming Blore Heath Rural District in Staffordshire).

In 1966 the district was merged with the Market Drayton urban district and renamed the 'Market Drayton' rural district.

In 1974, under the Local Government Act 1972 it was abolished, and became part of the North Shropshire district.
