= Shifnal Rural District =

Former local government area in the UK

Coordinates: 52.666°N 2.373°W

Shifnal was a rural district in Shropshire, England from 1894 to 1974.

It was created from the Shifnal rural sanitary district by the Local Government Act 1894. Until 1934 it also administered two parishes in Staffordshire, Blymhill and Weston under Lizard, which were transferred to the Cannock Rural District.

In the 1960s it lost the parish of Stirchley to Dawley urban district, and Stockton and Sutton Maddock to Bridgnorth Rural District

It continued in existence until 1974 when most of it went to form part of the new Bridgnorth district, with the small part in Telford New Town going to The Wrekin district.
