= Wellington Rural District, Shropshire =

Former local government area in the UK

Coordinates: 52.704°N 2.496°W

Wellington was a rural district in Shropshire, England from 1894 to 1974.

It was formed under the Local Government Act 1894 (56 & 57 Vict. c. 73) based on the Wellington rural sanitary district. In 1934, under a County Review Order, it took in the disbanded Newport Rural District.

It was abolished in 1974 under the Local Government Act 1972, and went on to form part of the Wrekin district. Since 1998 this has been a unitary authority under the name 'Telford and Wrekin' (Telford being the new town now at the centre of the district).
