= Clun and Bishop's Castle Rural District =

Former local government area in the UK

Coordinates: 52.470°N 2.943°W

Clun and Bishop's Castle
- Area
  - 1901: 82,206 acres (332.7 km^{2})
  - 1961: 132,512 acres (536.3 km^{2})
- Population
  - 1901: 6,824
  - 1971: 8,883
- History
  - Created: 1894
  - Abolished: 1974
  - Succeeded by: South Shropshire
- Status: Rural district
  - HQ: Clun

Clun and Bishop's Castle was a rural district in Shropshire, England from 1894 to 1974.

It was created by the Local Government Act 1894 as the Clun Rural District, based on the Clun rural sanitary district. It was enlarged in 1934 under a County Review Order by taking in the disbanded Chirbury Rural District and Teme Rural District.

1967 saw the district renamed 'Clun and Bishop's Castle', when it absorbed the municipal borough of Bishop's Castle. Bishop's Castle became a rural borough within the rural district.

The district was abolished in 1974 under the Local Government Act 1972, and was merged to form part of the South Shropshire district.

== Civil parishes ==
The rural district contained the following civil parishes:

- Bedstone (from 1934)†
- Bettwys y Crwyn (from 1934)†
- Bishop's Castle (Rural Borough) (from 1967)
- Bishop's Castle Rural (until 1934) The parish was abolished, partly to create Colebatch CP, remainder absorbed by Lydham CP
- Brompton and Rhiston (from 1934)‡
- Bucknell (from 1934)†
- Chirbury (from 1934)‡
- Clun
- Clunbury
- Clungunford
- Colebatch (created 1934 from part of Bishop's Castle Rural CP)
- Edgton
- Hopesay
- Hopton Castle
- Llanfair Waterdine (from 1934)†
- Lydbury North
- Lydham
- Mainstone
- More
- Myndtown
- Norbury
- Ratlinghope
- Shelve
- Stowe (from 1934)†
- Wentnor
- Worthen (from 1934)‡

†Previously in Teme Rural District

‡Previously in Chirbury Rural District
