= Ludlow Rural District =

Former local government area in the UK

Coordinates: 52.371°N 2.721°W

Ludlow was a rural district in Shropshire, England from 1894 to 1974.

It was created by the Local Government Act 1894 from the Ludlow rural sanitary district. It was enlarged in 1934 under a County Review Order by taking in the disbanded Burford Rural District and parts of the Church Stretton Rural District and Cleobury Mortimer Rural District. Church Stretton, formerly an urban district was added to the district in 1966. Then in 1967 it absorbed the municipal borough of Ludlow, which became a rural borough within the rural district.

The district (and rural borough of Ludlow) was abolished in 1974 under the Local Government Act 1972, and was merged to form part of the South Shropshire district.
