= ONS coding system =

Code used in the UK to tabulate statistical data

The ONS coding system was a hierarchical code used in the United Kingdom for tabulating census and other statistical data. ONS refers to the Office for National Statistics.

It was replaced by the GSS coding system on 1 January 2011.

== Code formulation ==
=== Principal authorities ===
The code was constructed top down from a four character code representing a unitary authority or two-tier county and district.

00EC	Middlesbrough (unitary)
or
12	Cambridgeshire county
12UB	Cambridge district

=== Electoral wards and output areas ===
Local government wards had a two-letter code within their local authority, and census output area an additional four digits within a ward.

12UB	Cambridge district
12UBGA	Petersfield ward
12UBGA0001	Output area: Gwydir Street (north of junction with Hooper St)

The authority and ward codes were recognised by Eurostat as local administrative unit code levels 1 and 2 within the NUTS system.

=== Civil parishes ===
An overlapping system encoded civil parish areas. Parishes were represented by an additional three digits within their local authority:

12UD	Fenland district
12UD010	Tydd St. Giles parish

== List of codes for counties and districts ==
The codes for counties and districts were as follows.

Also showing NUTS(3) codes thus: (UKH12)

=== Greater London ===
These codes became active following local government changes in 1986.

- 00AA (UKI11) City of London
- 00AB (UKI21) Barking and Dagenham
- 00AC (UKI23) Barnet
- 00AD (UKI21) Bexley
- 00AE (UKI23) Brent
- 00AF (UKI22) Bromley
- 00AG (UKI11) Camden
- 00AH (UKI22) Croydon
- 00AJ (UKI23) Ealing
- 00AK (UKI21) Enfield
- 00AL (UKI21) Greenwich
- 00AM (UKI12) Hackney
- 00AN (UKI11) Hammersmith and Fulham
- 00AP (UKI12) Haringey
- 00AQ (UKI23) Harrow
- 00AR (UKI21) Havering
- 00AS (UKI23) Hillingdon
- 00AT (UKI23) Hounslow
- 00AU (UKI12) Islington
- 00AW (UKI11) Kensington and Chelsea
- 00AX (UKI22) Kingston upon Thames
- 00AY (UKI12) Lambeth
- 00AZ (UKI12) Lewisham
- 00BA (UKI22) Merton
- 00BB (UKI12) Newham
- 00BC (UKI21) Redbridge
- 00BD (UKI23) Richmond upon Thames
- 00BE (UKI12) Southwark
- 00BF (UKI22) Sutton
- 00BG (UKI12) Tower Hamlets
- 00BH (UKI21) Waltham Forest
- 00BJ (UKI11) Wandsworth
- 00BK (UKI11) Westminster

=== Metropolitan counties ===
These codes became active following local government changes in 1986.

- Greater Manchester districts
  - 00BL (UKD32) Bolton
  - 00BM (UKD32) Bury
  - 00BN (UKD31) Manchester
  - 00BP (UKD32) Oldham
  - 00BQ (UKD32) Rochdale
  - 00BR (UKD31) Salford
  - 00BS (UKD31) Stockport
  - 00BT (UKD31) Tameside
  - 00BU (UKD31) Trafford
  - 00BW (UKD32) Wigan
- Merseyside districts
  - 00BX (UKD51) Knowsley
  - 00BY (UKD52) Liverpool
  - 00BZ (UKD51) St Helens
  - 00CA (UKD53) Sefton
  - 00CB (UKD54) Wirral
- South Yorkshire districts
  - 00CC (UKE31) Barnsley
  - 00CE (UKE31) Doncaster
  - 00CF (UKE31) Rotherham
  - 00CG (UKE32) Sheffield
- Tyne and Wear districts
  - 00CH (UKC22) Gateshead
  - 00CJ (UKC22) Newcastle-upon-Tyne
  - 00CK (UKC22) North Tyneside
  - 00CL (UKC22) South Tyneside
  - 00CM (UKC23) Sunderland
- West Midlands districts
  - 00CN (UKG31) Birmingham
  - 00CQ (UKG33) Coventry
  - 00CR (UKG34) Dudley
  - 00CS (UKG34) Sandwell
  - 00CT (UKG32) Solihull
  - 00CU (UKG35) Walsall
  - 00CW (UKG35) Wolverhampton
- West Yorkshire districts
  - 00CX (UKE41) Bradford
  - 00CY (UKE43) Calderdale
  - 00CZ (UKE43) Kirklees
  - 00DA (UKE42) Leeds
  - 00DB (UKE43) Wakefield

=== Non-hierarchical codes for Greater London and metropolitan counties ===
- 1B Inner London
- 1C Outer London
- 2A Greater Manchester
- 2B Merseyside
- 2C South Yorkshire
- 2D Tyne and Wear
- 2E West Midlands
- 2F West Yorkshire

=== Unitary authorities established in the 1990s ===
These codes became active following local government changes the 1990s.

- North East England region
  - 00EB (UKC11) Hartlepool
  - 00EC (UKC12) Middlesbrough
  - 00EE (UKC12) Redcar and Cleveland
  - 00EF (UKC11) Stockton-on-Tees
  - 00EH (UKC13) Darlington
- North West England region
  - 00ET (UKD21) Halton
  - 00EU (UKD21) Warrington
  - 00EX (UKD41) Blackburn with Darwen
  - 00EY (UKD42) Blackpool
- Yorkshire and the Humber region
  - 00FA (UKE11) Kingston upon Hull
  - 00FB (UKE12) East Riding of Yorkshire
  - 00FC (UKE13) North East Lincolnshire
  - 00FD (UKE13) North Lincolnshire
  - 00FF (UKE21) York
- East Midlands region
  - 00FK (UKF11) Derby
  - 00FN (UKF21) Leicester
  - 00FP (UKF22) Rutland
  - 00FY (UKF14) Nottingham
- West Midlands region
  - 00GA (UKG11) Herefordshire
  - 00GF (UKG21) Telford and Wrekin
  - 00GL (UKG23) Stoke-on-Trent
- South West England region
  - 00HA (UKK12) Bath and North East Somerset
  - 00HB (UKK11) Bristol
  - 00HC (UKK12) North Somerset
  - 00HD (UKK12) South Gloucestershire
  - 00HG (UKK41) Plymouth
  - 00HH (UKK42) Torbay
  - 00HN (UKK21) Bournemouth
  - 00HP (UKK21) Poole
  - 00HX (UKK14) Swindon
- East of England region
  - 00JA (UKH11) Peterborough
  - 00KA (UKH21) Luton
  - 00KF (UKH31) Southend-on-Sea
  - 00KG (UKH32) Thurrock
- South East England region
  - 00LC (UKJ41) Medway
  - 00MA (UKJ11) Bracknell Forest
  - 00MB (UKJ11) West Berkshire
  - 00MC (UKJ11) Reading
  - 00MD (UKJ11) Slough
  - 00ME (UKJ11) Windsor and Maidenhead
  - 00MF (UKJ11) Wokingham
  - 00MG (UKJ12) Milton Keynes
  - 00ML (UKJ21) Brighton and Hove
  - 00MR (UKJ31) Portsmouth
  - 00MS (UKJ32) Southampton
  - 00MW (UKJ34) Isle of Wight

=== Unitary authorities established in 2009 ===
These codes became active following local government changes in 2009.

- 00KB Bedford
- 00KC Central Bedfordshire
- 00EQ Cheshire East
- 00EW Cheshire West and Chester
- 00HE Cornwall
- 00HF Isles of Scilly
- 00EJ County Durham
- 00EM Northumberland
- 00GG Shropshire
- 00HY Wiltshire

=== Non-metropolitan counties ===
- 08 Avon
  - 08UB Bath
  - 08UC Bristol
  - 08UD Kingswood
  - 08UE Northavon
  - 08UF Wansdyke
  - 08UG Woodspring
- 09 (UKH22) Bedfordshire
  - 09UB Luton
  - 09UC Mid Bedfordshire
  - 09UD Bedford
  - 09UE South Bedfordshire
- 10 Berkshire
  - 10UB Bracknell Forest
  - 10UC Newbury
  - 10UD Reading
  - 10UE Slough
  - 10UF Windsor and Maidenhead
  - 10UG Wokingham
- 11 (UKJ13) Buckinghamshire
  - 11UB Aylesbury Vale
  - 11UC Chiltern
  - 11UD Milton Keynes
  - 11UE South Bucks
  - 11UF Wycombe
- 12 (UKH12) Cambridgeshire
  - 12UB Cambridge
  - 12UC East Cambridgeshire
  - 12UD Fenland
  - 12UE Huntingdonshire
  - 12UF Peterborough
  - 12UG South Cambridgeshire
- 13 (UKD22) Cheshire
  - 13UB Chester
  - 13UC Congleton
  - 13UD Crewe and Nantwich
  - 13UE Ellesmere Port and Neston
  - 13UF Halton
  - 13UG Macclesfield
  - 13UH Vale Royal
  - 13UJ Warrington
- 14 Cleveland
  - 14UB Hartlepool
  - 14UC Langbaurgh-on-Tees
  - 14UD Middlesbrough
  - 14UE Stockton-on-Tees
- 15 (UKK30) Cornwall and Scilly
  - 15UB Caradon
  - 15UC Carrick
  - 15UD Kerrier
  - 15UE North Cornwall
  - 15UF Penwith
  - 15UG Restormel
  - 15UH Isles of Scilly
- 16 Cumbria
  - 16UB (UKD11) Allerdale
  - 16UC (UKD11) Barrow-in-Furness
  - 16UD (UKD12) Carlisle
  - 16UE (UKD11) Copeland
  - 16UF (UKD12) Eden
  - 16UG (UKD12) South Lakeland
- 17 Derbyshire
  - 17UB (UKF13) Amber Valley
  - 17UC (UKF12) Bolsover
  - 17UD (UKF12) Chesterfield
  - 17UE Derby
  - 17UF (UKF13) Derbyshire Dales
  - 17UG (UKF13) Erewash
  - 17UH (UKF13) High Peak
  - 17UJ (UKF12) North East Derbyshire
  - 17UK (UKF13) South Derbyshire
- 18 (UKK43) Devon
  - 18UB East Devon
  - 18UC Exeter
  - 18UD Mid Devon
  - 18UE North Devon
  - 19UF Plymouth
  - 18UG South Hams
  - 18UH Teignbridge
  - 19UJ Torbay
  - 18UK Torridge
  - 18UL West Devon
- 19 (UKK22) Dorset
  - 19UB Bournemouth
  - 19UC Christchurch
  - 19UD East Dorset
  - 19UE North Dorset
  - 19UF Poole
  - 19UG Purbeck
  - 19UH West Dorset
  - 19UJ Weymouth and Portland
- 20 (UKC14) County Durham
  - 20UB Chester-le-Street
  - 20UC Darlington
  - 20UD Derwentside
  - 20UE Durham
  - 20UF Easington
  - 20UG Sedgefield
  - 20UH Teesdale
  - 20UJ Wear Valley
- 21 (UKJ22) East Sussex
  - 21UB Brighton
  - 21UC Eastbourne
  - 21UD Hastings
  - 21UE Hove
  - 21UF Lewes
  - 21UG Rother
  - 21UH Wealden
- 22 (UKH33) Essex
  - 22UB Basildon
  - 22UC Braintree
  - 22UD Brentwood
  - 22UE Castle Point
  - 22UF Chelmsford
  - 22UG Colchester
  - 22UH Epping Forest
  - 22UJ Harlow
  - 22UK Maldon
  - 22UL Rochford
  - 22UM Southend-on-Sea
  - 22UN Tendring
  - 22UP Thurrock
  - 22UQ Uttlesford
- 23 (UKK13) Gloucestershire
  - 23UB Cheltenham
  - 23UC Cotswold
  - 23UD Forest of Dean
  - 23UE Gloucester
  - 23UF Stroud
  - 23UG Tewkesbury
- 24 (UKJ33) Hampshire
  - 24UB Basingstoke and Deane
  - 24UC East Hampshire
  - 24UD Eastleigh
  - 24UE Fareham
  - 24UF Gosport
  - 24UG Hart
  - 24UH Havant
  - 24UJ New Forest
  - 24UK Portsmouth
  - 24UL Rushmoor
  - 24UM Southampton
  - 24UN Test Valley
  - 24UP Winchester
- 25 Hereford and Worcester
  - 25UB Bromsgrove
  - 25UC Hereford
  - 25UD Leominster
  - 25UE Malvern Hills
  - 25UF Redditch
  - 25UG South Herefordshire
  - 25UH Worcester
  - 25UJ Wyre Forest
  - 25UK Wychavon
- 26 (UKH23) Hertfordshire
  - 26UB Broxbourne
  - 26UC Dacorum
  - 26UD East Hertfordshire
  - 26UE Hertsmere
  - 26UF North Hertfordshire
  - 26UG St Albans
  - 26UH Stevenage
  - 26UJ Three Rivers
  - 26UK Watford
  - 26UL Welwyn Hatfield
- 27 Humberside
  - 27UB Boothferry
  - 27UC Cleethorpes
  - 27UD East Yorkshire
  - 27UE Beverley
  - 27UF Glanford
  - 27UG Holderness
  - 27UH Great Grimsby
  - 27UJ Kingston upon Hull
  - 27UK Scunthorpe
- 28 Isle of Wight county
  - 28UB Medina
  - 28UC South Wight
- 29 (UKJ42) Kent
  - 29UB Ashford
  - 29UC Canterbury
  - 29UD Dartford
  - 29UE Dover
  - 29UF Gillingham
  - 29UG Gravesham
  - 29UH Maidstone
  - 29UJ Rochester upon Medway
  - 29UK Sevenoaks
  - 29UL Shepway
  - 29UM Swale
  - 29UN Thanet
  - 29UP Tonbridge and Malling
  - 29UQ Tunbridge Wells
- 30 (UKD43) Lancashire
  - 30UB Blackburn
  - 30UC Blackpool
  - 30UD Burnley
  - 30UE Chorley
  - 30UF Fylde
  - 30UG Hyndburn
  - 30UH Lancaster
  - 30UJ Pendle
  - 30UK Preston
  - 30UL Ribble Valley
  - 30UM Rossendale
  - 30UN South Ribble
  - 30UP West Lancashire
  - 30UQ Wyre
- 31 (UKF22) Leicestershire
  - 31UB Blaby
  - 31UC Charnwood
  - 31UD Harborough
  - 31UE Hinckley and Bosworth
  - 31UF Leicester
  - 31UG Melton
  - 31UH North West Leicestershire
  - 31UJ Oadby and Wigston
  - 31UK Rutland
- 32 (UKF30) Lincolnshire
  - 32UB Boston
  - 32UC East Lindsey
  - 32UD Lincoln
  - 32UE North Kesteven
  - 32UF South Holland
  - 32UG South Kesteven
  - 32UH West Lindsey
- 33 (UKH13) Norfolk
  - 33UB Breckland
  - 33UC Broadland
  - 33UD Great Yarmouth
  - 33UE King's Lynn and West Norfolk
  - 33UF North Norfolk
  - 33UG Norwich
  - 33UH South Norfolk
- 34 (UKF23) Northamptonshire
  - 34UB Corby
  - 34UC Daventry
  - 34UD East Northamptonshire
  - 34UE Kettering
  - 34UF Northampton
  - 34UG South Northamptonshire
  - 34UH Wellingborough
- 35 (UKC21) Northumberland
  - 35UB Alnwick
  - 35UC Berwick-upon-Tweed
  - 35UD Blyth Valley
  - 35UE Castle Morpeth
  - 35UF Tynedale
  - 35UG Wansbeck
- 36 (UKE22) North Yorkshire
  - 36UB Craven
  - 36UC Hambleton
  - 36UD Harrogate
  - 36UE Richmondshire
  - 36UF Ryedale
  - 36UG Scarborough
  - 36UH Selby
  - 36UJ York
- 37 Nottinghamshire
  - 37UB (UKF15) Ashfield
  - 37UC (UKF15) Bassetlaw
  - 37UD (UKF16) Broxtowe
  - 37UE (UKF16) Gedling
  - 37UF (UKF15) Mansfield
  - 37UG (UKF15) Newark and Sherwood
  - 37UH Nottingham
  - 37UJ (UKF16) Rushcliffe
- 38 (UKJ14) Oxfordshire
  - 38UB Cherwell
  - 38UC Oxford
  - 38UD South Oxfordshire
  - 38UE Vale of White Horse
  - 38UF West Oxfordshire
- 39 (UKG22) Shropshire
  - 39UB Bridgnorth
  - 39UC North Shropshire
  - 39UD Oswestry
  - 39UE Shrewsbury and Atcham
  - 39UF South Shropshire
  - 39UG The Wrekin
- 40 (UKK23) Somerset
  - 40UB Mendip
  - 40UC Sedgemoor
  - 40UD South Somerset
  - 40UE Taunton Deane
  - 40UF West Somerset
- 41 (UKG24) Staffordshire
  - 41UB Cannock Chase
  - 41UC East Staffordshire
  - 41UD Lichfield
  - 41UE Newcastle-under-Lyme
  - 41UF South Staffordshire
  - 41UG Stafford
  - 41UH Staffordshire Moorlands
  - 41UJ Stoke-on-Trent
  - 41UK Tamworth
- 42 (UKH14) Suffolk
  - 42UB Babergh
  - 42UC Forest Heath
  - 42UD Ipswich
  - 42UE Mid Suffolk
  - 42UF St. Edmundsbury
  - 42UG Suffolk Coastal
  - 42UH Waveney
- 43 (UKJ23) Surrey
  - 43UB Elmbridge
  - 43UC Epsom and Ewell
  - 43UD Guildford
  - 43UE Mole Valley
  - 43UF Reigate and Banstead
  - 43UG Runnymede
  - 43UH Spelthorne
  - 43UJ Surrey Heath
  - 43UK Tandridge
  - 43UL Waverley
  - 43UM Woking
- 44 (UKG13) Warwickshire
  - 44UB North Warwickshire
  - 44UC Nuneaton and Bedworth
  - 44UD Rugby
  - 44UE Stratford-on-Avon
  - 44UF Warwick
- 45 (UKJ24) West Sussex
  - 45UB Adur
  - 45UC Arun
  - 45UD Chichester
  - 45UE Crawley
  - 45UF Horsham
  - 45UG Mid Sussex
  - 45UH Worthing
- 46 (UKK15) Wiltshire
  - 46UB Kennet
  - 46UC North Wiltshire
  - 46UD Salisbury
  - 46UE Thamesdown
  - 46UF West Wiltshire
- 47 (UKG12) Worcestershire
  - 47UB Bromsgrove
  - 47UC Malvern Hills
  - 47UD Redditch
  - 47UE Worcester
  - 47UF Wychavon
  - 47UG Wyre Forest

=== Wales ===
These codes became active following local government changes in 1996.

- 00NA (UKL11) Isle of Anglesey
- 00NC (UKL12) Gwynedd
- 00NE (UKL13) Conwy
- 00NG (UKL13) Denbighshire
- 00NJ (UKL23) Flintshire
- 00NL (UKL23) Wrexham
- 00NN (UKL24) Powys
- 00NQ (UKL14) Ceredigion
- 00NS (UKL14) Pembrokeshire
- 00NU (UKL14) Carmarthenshire
- 00NX (UKL18) Swansea
- 00NZ (UKL17) Neath Port Talbot
- 00PB (UKL17) Bridgend
- 00PD (UKL22) Vale of Glamorgan
- 00PF (UKL15) Rhondda Cynon Taff
- 00PH (UKL15) Merthyr Tydfil
- 00PK (UKL16) Caerphilly
- 00PL (UKL16) Blaenau Gwent
- 00PM (UKL16) Torfaen
- 00PP (UKL21) Monmouthshire
- 00PR (UKL21) Newport
- 00PT (UKL22) Cardiff

=== Scotland ===
These codes became active following local government changes in 1996.

- 00QA (UKM10) Aberdeen
- 00QB (UKM10) Aberdeenshire
- 00QC (UKM21) Angus
- 00QD (UKM31/43) Argyll and Bute
- 00QE (UKM24) Scottish Borders
- 00QF (UKM22) Clackmannanshire
- 00QG (UKM31) West Dunbartonshire
- 00QH (UKM32) Dumfries and Galloway
- 00QJ (UKM21) Dundee
- 00QK (UKM33) East Ayrshire
- 00QL (UKM31) East Dunbartonshire
- 00QM (UKM23) East Lothian
- 00QN (UKM35) East Renfrewshire
- 00QP (UKM25) Edinburgh
- 00QQ (UKM26) Falkirk
- 00QR (UKM22) Fife
- 00QS (UKM34) Glasgow
- 00QT (UKM41/42/43) Highland
- 00QU (UKM35) Inverclyde
- 00QW (UKM23) Midlothian
- 00QX (UKM10/42) Moray
- 00QY (UKM33/43) North Ayrshire
- 00QZ (UKM36) North Lanarkshire
- 00RA (UKM45) Orkney Islands
- 00RB (UKM27) Perth and Kinross
- 00RC (UKM35) Renfrewshire
- 00RD (UKM46) Shetland Islands
- 00RE (UKM37) South Ayrshire
- 00RF (UKM38) South Lanarkshire
- 00RG (UKM27) Stirling
- 00RH (UKM28) West Lothian
- 00RJ (UKM44) Eilean Siar (Western Isles)

=== Northern Ireland ===
- 95A (UKN04) Derry
- 95B (UKN04) Limavady
- 95C (UKN04) Coleraine
- 95D (UKN04) Ballymoney
- 95E (UKN04) Moyle
- 95F (UKN03) Larne
- 95G (UKN03) Ballymena
- 95H (UKN05) Magherafelt
- 95I (UKN05) Cookstown
- 95J (UKN04) Strabane
- 95K (UKN05) Omagh
- 95L (UKN05) Fermanagh
- 95M (UKN05) Dungannon and South Tyrone
- 95N (UKN03) Craigavon
- 95O (UKN05) Armagh
- 95P (UKN05) Newry and Mourne
- 95Q (UKN03) Banbridge
- 95R (UKN03) Down
- 95S (UKN02) Lisburn
- 95T (UKN03) Antrim
- 95U (UKN02) Newtownabbey
- 95V (UKN02) Carrickfergus
- 95W (UKN02) North Down
- 95X (UKN03) Ards
- 95Y (UKN02) Castlereagh
- 95Z (UKN01) Belfast
