= North Shropshire Rural District =

Former local government district in Shropshire, England

Coordinates: 52.856°N 2.723°W

North Shropshire was a rural district in Shropshire, England from 1967 to 1974.

It was formed in 1967 by a merger of most of the Ellesmere Rural District, Wem Rural District, along with the urban districts of Ellesmere, Wem and Whitchurch, and part of Whittington from Oswestry Rural District.

The district survived until 1974 when it was abolished under the Local Government Act 1972 to form part of a new, larger North Shropshire district.
