= Shropshire (district) =

Unitary authority area in England

- Unitary authority area
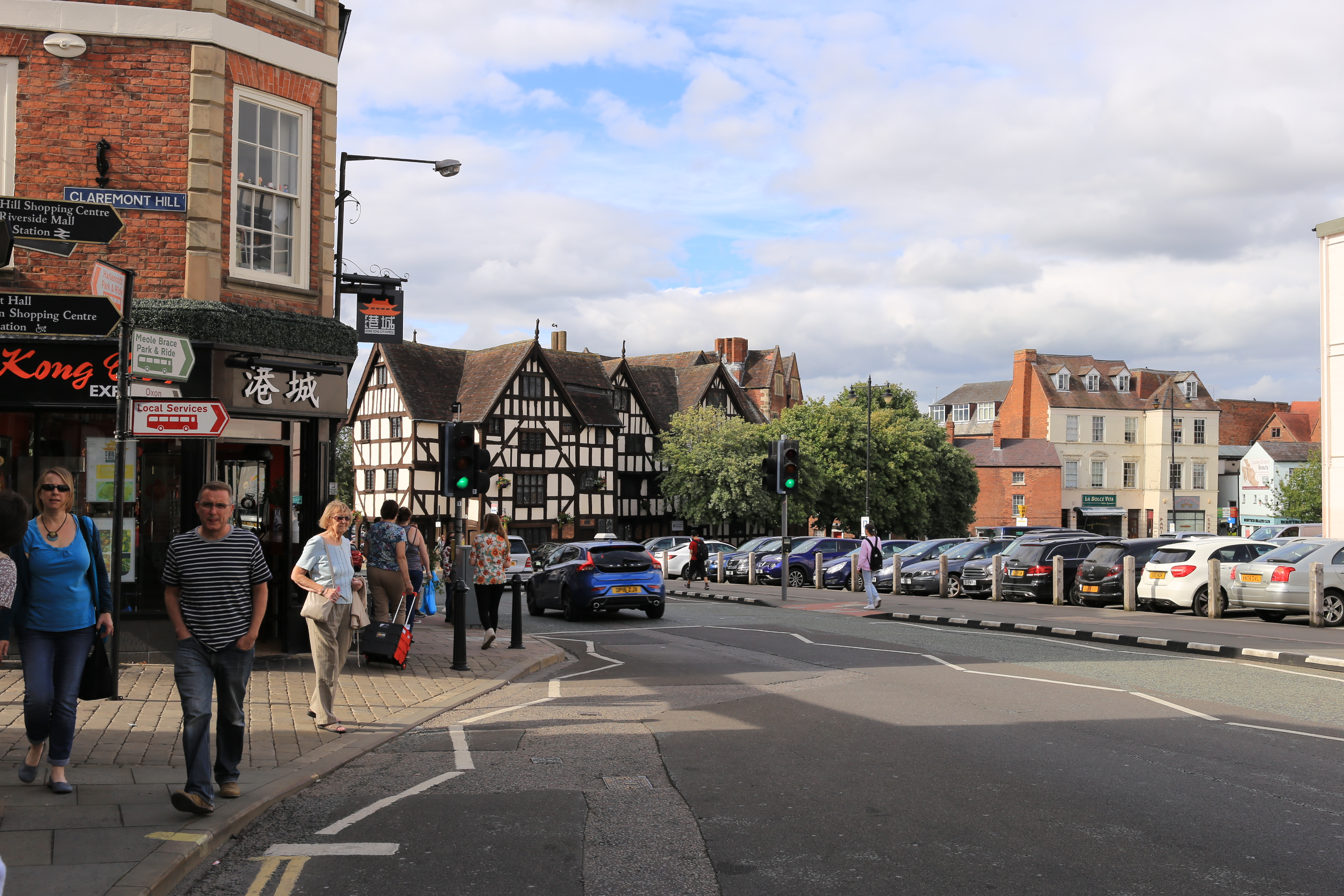
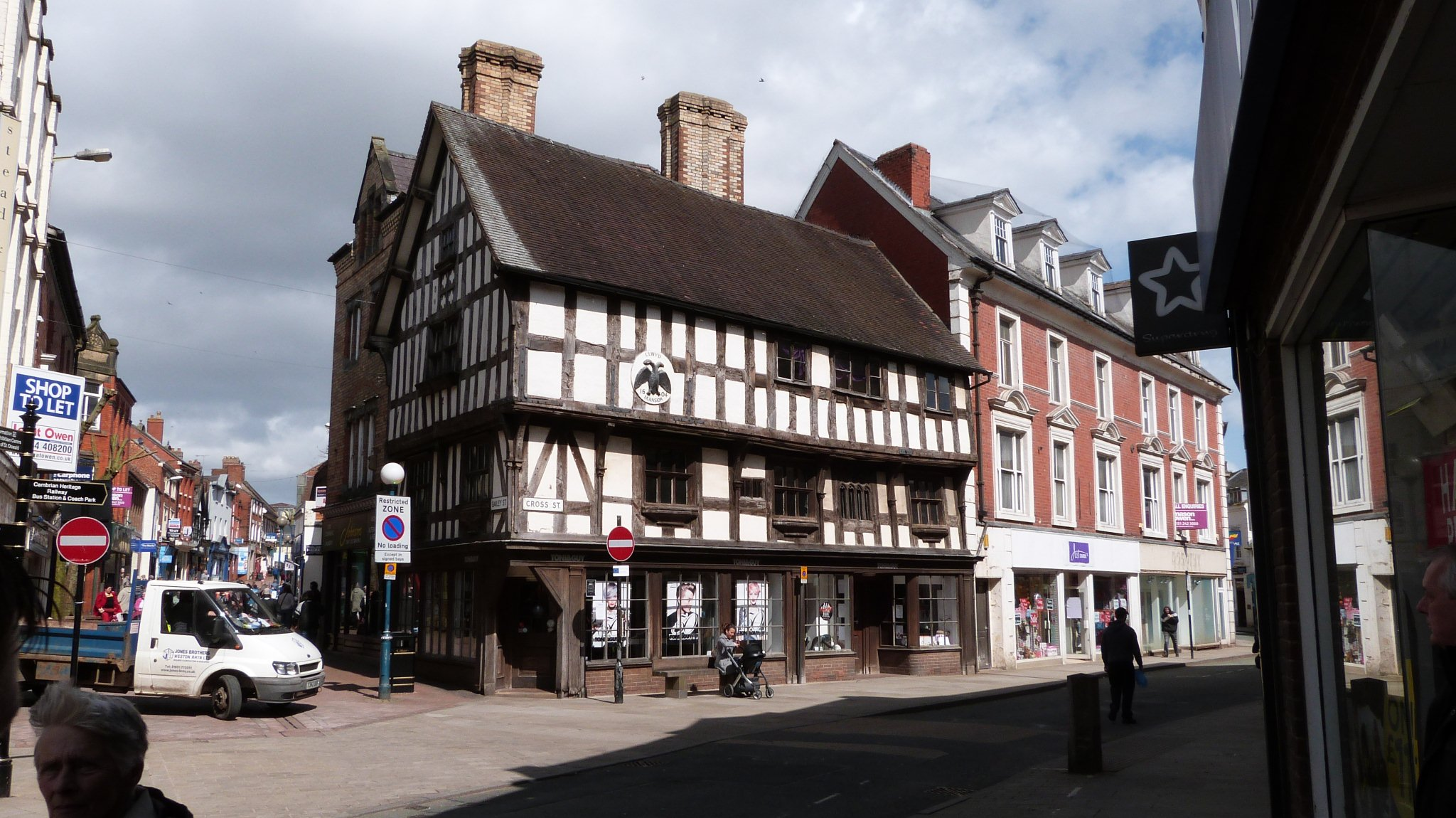
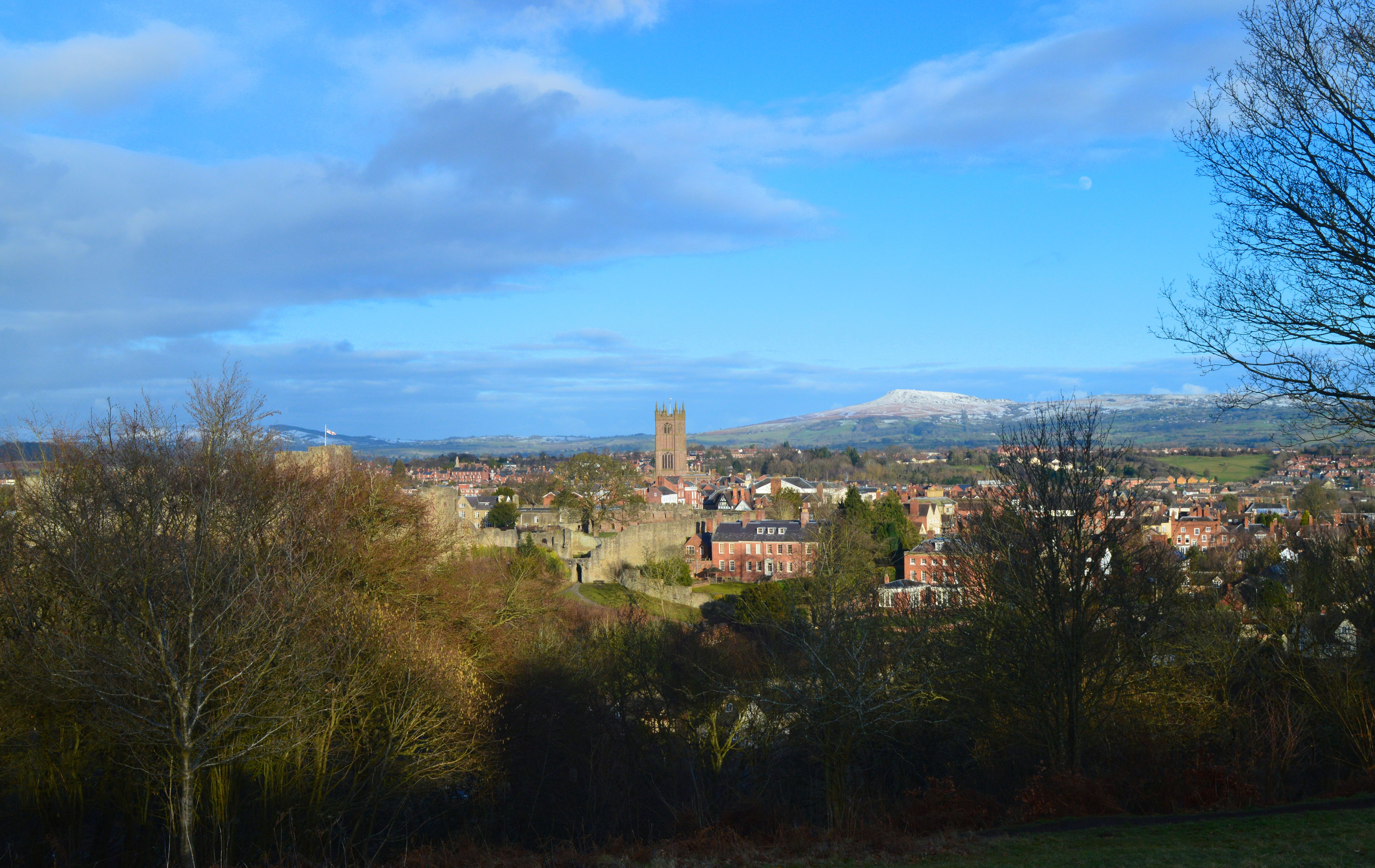
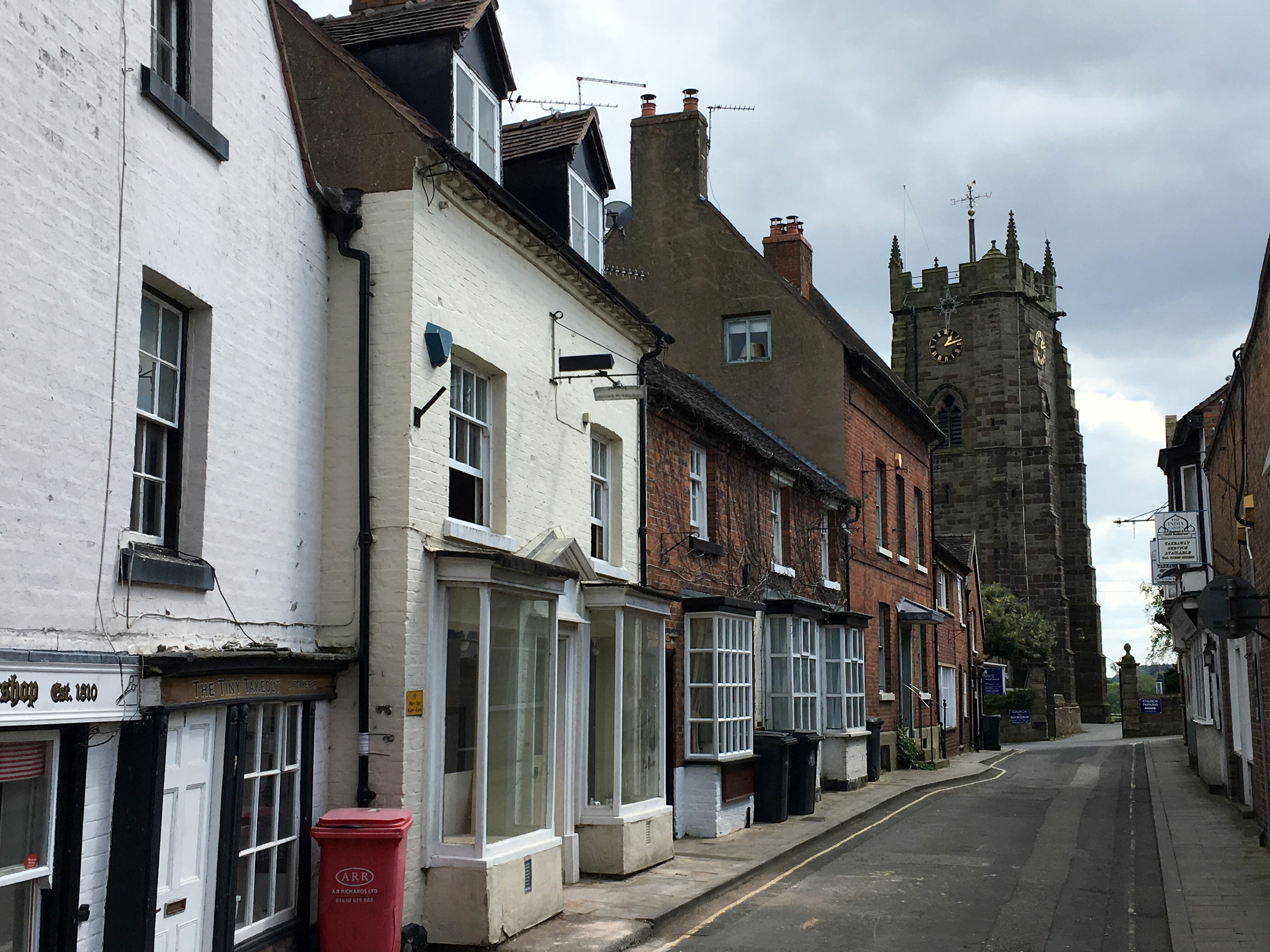
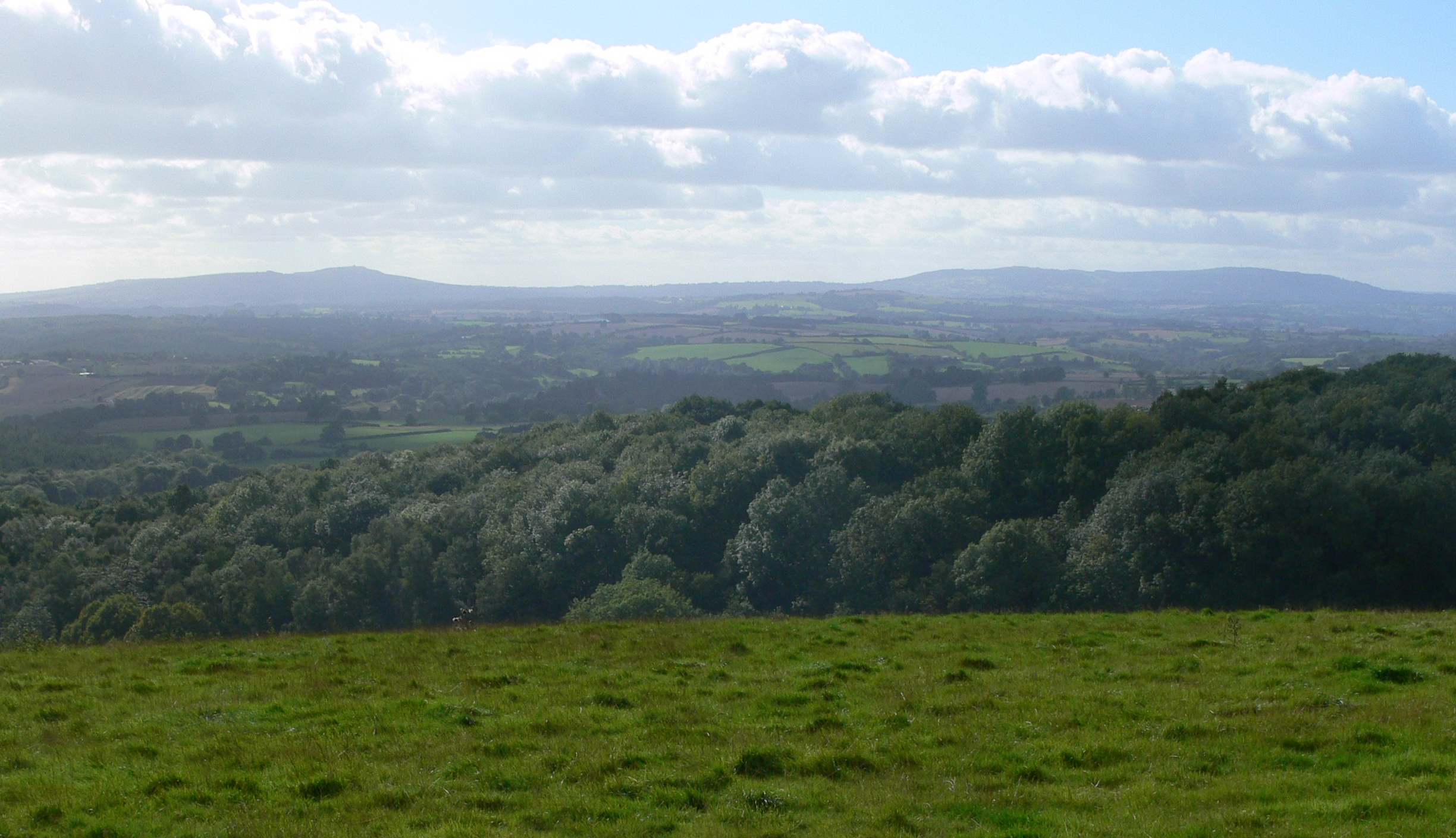
- Clockwise from top: Shrewsbury; Ludlow from the castle; the Shropshire Hills; Market Drayton; and Oswestry

- Coat of arms

- Shown within the ceremonial county of Shropshire
- Interactive map of Shropshire
- Location within England Location within the United Kingdom Location in Europe
- Sovereign state: United Kingdom
- Country: England
- Region: West Midlands
- County: Shropshire
- Unitary Authority: 1 April 2009

Government
  - Type: Non-metropolitan district
  - Local Authority: Shropshire Council
  - MPs: Julia Buckley (L); Stuart Anderson (C); Helen Morgan (LD); Mark Pritchard (C)

Area
  - Land: 1.234 sq mi (3.197 km^{2})

Population (2025)
  - Total: 333,162 (Ranked 37th)
  - Density: 269.3/sq mi (103.99/km^{2})

Ethnicity (2021)
  - Ethnic groups: List: 96.7% White; 1.3% Asian; 1.2% Mixed; 0.4% other; 0.3% Black

Religion (2021)
  - Religion: List: 55.5% Christianity; 37% no religion; 0.5% Islam; 0.2% Hinduism; 0.1% Judaism; 0.2% Sikhism; 0.3% Buddhism; 0.5% other; 5.9% not stated
- Time zone: UTC+0 (Greenwich Mean Time)
- Postcode: SY1-SY13, SY15, SY21, SY99, TF9, TF11-TF13, WV15-WV16, LL14, WR15
- Post town: Shrewsbury and others
- Dialling code: 01743 and others
- ISO 3166 code: GB-SHR
- ONS code: 17UD (ONS); E06000051 (GSS)
- Website: shropshire.gov.uk

Shropshire is a unitary authority area in the ceremonial county of Shropshire, in the West Midlands region of England. It was created on 1 April 2009 from the former districts of Bridgnorth, North Shropshire, Oswestry, Shrewsbury and Atcham and South Shropshire. The district is governed by Shropshire Council. It contains 188 civil parishes.

== Geography ==
The district covers the towns of Oswestry, Church Stretton, Craven Arms, Ellesmere, Wem, Whitchurch, Much Wenlock, Shifnal, Bridgnorth, Broseley, Clun, Knighton (part), Bishop's Castle, Cleobury Mortimer, Market Drayton and Shrewsbury.

Neighbouring council areas
Local authority	In relation to the district
Cheshire East	North
Borough of Newcastle-under-Lyme	North east
Borough of Stafford	North east
Telford and Wrekin	North east
South Staffordshire	East
Wyre Forest District	South east
Malvern Hills District	South
Herefordshire	South
Powys	West and south west
Wrexham County Borough	North west
Cheshire West and Chester	North west (short border at Grindley Brook)

== Governance ==
The council was under Conservative control from its creation in 2009 until 2025, when control passed to the Liberal Democrats.
