= Local Government Act 1958 =

Act of the Parliament of the United Kingdom

Local Government Act 1958 (Note: Section 68.)
- Act of Parliament
- Parliament of the United Kingdom
- Long title: An Act to make further provision, as respects England and Wales, with respect to grants to local or police authorities, with respect to the rating of industrial and freight-transport hereditaments and of transport, electricity and gas authorities, with respect to the making of changes in the area, name, status and functions of local authorities, and with respect to local government finance and elections; to amend the law in England and Wales and in Northern Ireland as to the making by trustees of loans to local and other authorities; and for purposes connected with the matters aforesaid.
- Citation: 6 & 7 Eliz. 2. c. 55
- Introduced by: Henry Brooke (Commons)
- Territorial extent: United Kingdom

Dates
- Royal assent: 23 July 1958
- Commencement: 23 July 1958 (Note: The Acts of Parliament (Commencement) Act 1793.)
Other legislation
Amends	Local Government Act 1894; Local Government_Act 1933; Local Government Act 1948; Prevention of Damage by Pests Act 1949
Repeals/revokes	Local Government Boundary Commission (Dissolution) Act 1949
Amended by	Statute Law Revision Act 1948; Mental Health Act 1959; Road Traffic Act 1960; Charities Act 1960; Trustee Investments Act 1961; Vehicles (Excise) Act 1962; London Government Act 1963; Police Act 1964; Police Act 1996; General Rate Act 1967; Local Government (Termination of Reviews) Act 1967; Children and Young Persons Act 1969; Local Authority Social Services Act 1970; Courts Act 1971; Housing Finance Act 1972; Gas Act 1972; Local Government Act 1972; Statute Law (Repeals) Act 1974; Statute Law (Repeals) Act 1975; Statute Law (Repeals) Act 1978; Child Care Act 1980; Representation of the People Act 1983; Statute Law (Repeals) Act 1993; Statute Law (Repeals) Act 2004

Status: Partially repealed

Text of statute as originally enacted

Revised text of statute as amended

Text of the Local Government Act 1958 as in force today (including any amendments) within the United Kingdom, from legislation.gov.uk.

The Local Government Act 1958 (6 & 7 Eliz. 2. c. 55) is an act of the Parliament of the United Kingdom affecting local government in England and Wales outside London. Among its provisions it included the establishment of Local Government Commissions to review the areas and functions of local authorities, and introduced new procedures for carrying these into action.

== White papers ==
The act originated in three government white papers.

The first of these, Local government – areas and status of local authorities in England and Wales, was published on 31 July 1956 (Cmnd. 9831). Rather than completely reforming the local government system, it proposed a partial overhaul of the existing system. Two local government commissions, one for England and one for Wales, were to be established to carry out reviews under these guidelines. The commissions were to have powers to:

- Constitute or extend county boroughs, removing the power of boroughs to promote local bills for this purpose. The population requirement for becoming a county borough would be raised. The English commission was not permitted to create county boroughs in Middlesex, as this would lead to the disintegration of the administrative county, which the government wished to retain as part of the administration of the Greater London area.
- Establish new, larger authorities in the large conurbations.
- Reduce the number of small county districts by amalgamation.
- Alter county boundaries.
- In exceptional cases, amalgamate counties.

The County of London was to be excluded from the reviews.

The Association of Municipal Authorities, which represented 432 boroughs in England and Wales gave its considered response to the paper in December. They pointed out that there were "unhappy relationships" between many county councils and boroughs in their area, with the inconsistent delegation of powers by the counties to the boroughs. The association wished for these powers to be conferred by legislation instead of delegated.

They also wanted any future reviews of county districts to be conducted by the commissions and not by county councils. They also stated their view that the population requirement for new county boroughs should be based on projected rather than present population. They also suggested that where rural parishes were included in an extended borough, the parish council should continue to exist, and that it should be possible to create parish councils within existing urban areas. The association also recommended that additional powers be devolved from the county to the boroughs in Middlesex.

The second white paper Local government – functions of county councils and county district councils was published on 2 May 1957 (Cmnd. 161). The document proposed giving additional powers to larger non-county boroughs and urban districts. Such towns, if they had a population of 60,000 would be entitled to assume responsibility for a number of county-level functions among which were education, welfare and health services, libraries, classified roads, bridges, licensing of cinemas and theatres if they so wished. County councils would also be permitted to delegate these powers to smaller county districts. Rural districts with less than 6,000 inhabitants would not be eligible to gain delegated powers, and those already exercising them would lose them.

The third white paper, Local Government Finance (England and Wales) (Cmnd. 207) was published on 10 July 1957. The rating system was to be reformed with industry and freight to pay 50% instead of 25% rates. Nationalised industries were also to be brought into the rating system. It was anticipated that the measures would produce thirty million pounds per year. This would allow the government to reduce grants to local authorities. A general grant would be payable to county and county borough councils according to population and a number of other factors, the amount of which would be fixed for a number of years. Rate deficiency grants (renamed from equalisation grants) were to make up any shortfall in rate product to qualifying councils.

== Passage ==
The opposition Labour Party and education groups opposed the general or block grant on the basis that it would lead to cut-backs in educational expenditure. However, attempts to overturn the policy were defeated. James MacColl, the Labour MP for Widnes, introduced an unsuccessful amendment for the establishment of a local income tax.

Outside of Parliament, the Cinque Ports voiced their opposition to the bill, in particular the amalgamation or reduction in status of smaller boroughs in the confederation.

On 6 May 1958, a group of fourteen Conservative MPs representing coastal resorts revolted against the government. They sought a change in the rating formula, so that resort towns would be reckoned as having fifty per cent more than their resident winter population. This was so that they could provide services to the much larger number of inhabitants in the Summer. The amendment was lost, with only the opposition member for Lowestoft voting with the "rebels".

== Provisions ==
- Part I of the act dealt with the finance of councils, in particular it introduced a general grant, payable to all councils, and a rate-deficiency grant for those councils whose area had lower than average per capita rates income. These measures replaced a number of earlier separate grants for different services, which reflected the increasing number of services being provided by local authorities. These grants were later replaced with the rate support grant by the General Rate Act 1967. Part I also dealt with the rating of the nationalised gas and electricity undertakings.
- Part II of the act dealt with reviews of local government areas. It established a Local Government Commission for England who were charged with reviewing the organisation of local government in five special review areas, and also had the power to make reviews elsewhere in England outside a defined metropolitan area. A similar Local Government Commission for Wales (including Monmouthshire) was also formed, although no special review areas were designated in Wales. Each county council in England and Wales was required to make a review of the local government in its area. However, they were not empowered to make any proposals in any place included in a special review area, or in the metropolitan area. As the entire County of London was included in the metropolitan area, the London County Council was excluded from making reviews. If the county council, in the opinion of the Minister of Health, had failed to carry out a proper review, he could ask the relevant local government commission to carry out one. Local authorities were prohibited from promoting any private bill to parliament "forming any new area of local government, or for altering, or altering the status of, any area of local government" for a period of fifteen years from the commencement of the act. Finally, the population required for the formation of a new county borough was increased from 75,000 to 100,000.
- Part III allowed county councils to delegate certain powers in relation to health, welfare and education to borough, rural or urban district councils.
- Part IV dealt with general and supplementary provisions of the act. One section in this part of the act – Section 59 – allowed the council of a county or county borough to change the name of the borough or county by agreement with the Minister for Health. This section was quickly used by Southampton County Council, which changed the administrative county's name (and therefore the council's name) to Hampshire from 1 April 1959. The power to change the name of urban and rural districts and of civil parishes remained with the county council under the Local Government Act 1894 (56 & 57 Vict. c. 73).

== Special review areas ==
The five special review areas consisted of major conurbations outside London: Tyneside, West Yorkshire, South East Lancashire, Merseyside and the West Midlands. A full review was only carried out in the West Midlands, when much of the review area was incorporated into five large county boroughs. Later legislation was to reform local government areas and services in these areas. Several police forces in the review areas were combined under the Police Act 1964, the Transport Act 1968 created transport authorities for four of the areas and all of the review areas were eventually to form the nucleus of metropolitan counties in 1974 under the Local Government Act 1972.

The commission requested in 1963 that the Merseyside and Selnec special review areas be extended such that they touched in the middle, thus including Warrington, St Helens and Wigan. The then government delayed a decision on the issue: new local government Minister Tony Crosland decided in April 1965 to allow modest expansions.

=== Tyneside ===
- The county boroughs of Gateshead, Newcastle upon Tyne, South Shields and Tynemouth
- Part of County Durham, namely: the municipal borough of Jarrow, and the urban districts of Blaydon, Felling, Hebburn, Ryton and Whickham
- Part of Northumberland, namely: the municipal boroughs of Wallsend and Whitley Bay, and the urban districts of Gosforth, Longbenton and Newburn.

These areas (except part of Whitley Bay) were all eventually included in the larger metropolitan county of Tyne and Wear (which also included the Sunderland area on Wearside) in 1974.

=== West Yorkshire ===
- The county boroughs of Bradford, Dewsbury, Halifax, Huddersfield, Leeds and Wakefield
- Part of the West Riding of Yorkshire, namely: the municipal boroughs of Batley, Brighouse, Castleford, Keighley, Morley, Ossett, Pontefract, Pudsey and Spenborough, and the urban districts of Aireborough, Baildon, Bingley, Colne Valley, Denby Dale, Denholme, Elland, Featherstone, Heckmondwike, Holmfirth, Horbury, Horsforth, Kirkburton, Knottingley, Meltham, Mirfield, Normanton, Queensbury and Shelf, Ripponden, Rothwell, Shipley, Sowerby Bridge and Stanley.

In 1974 this area formed the core of the metropolitan county of West Yorkshire, which also included some outlying rural areas and towns.

=== South East Lancashire ===
- The county boroughs of Bolton, Bury, Manchester, Oldham, Rochdale, Salford and Stockport
- Part of Cheshire, namely: the municipal boroughs of Altrincham, Dukinfield, Hyde, Sale and Stalybridge, the urban districts of Alderley Edge, Bowdon, Bredbury and Romiley, Cheadle and Gatley, Hale, Hazel Grove and Bramhall, Marple and Wilmslow, the rural district of Disley and the civil parishes of Carrington, Partington and Ringway in the Bucklow Rural District
- Part of Lancashire, namely: the municipal boroughs of Ashton-under-Lyne, Eccles, Farnworth, Heywood, Middleton, Mossley, Prestwich, Radcliffe, Stretford and Swinton and Pendlebury, and the urban districts of Audenshaw, Chadderton, Crompton, Denton, Droylsden, Failsworth, Horwich, Irlam, Kearsley, Lees, Littleborough, Little Lever, Milnrow, Royton, Tottington, Urmston, Wardle, Westhoughton, Whitefield, Whitworth and Worsley

The review area was later extended by the South East Lancashire Review Area Order 1965 to include:

- The urban district of Longdendale, and the parish of Poynton-with-Worth in Macclesfield Rural District in Cheshire
- The municipal borough of Glossop, the urban districts of New Mills and Whaley Bridge, the rural district of Disley and the parishes of Charlesworth and Chisworth in Chapel-en-le-Frith Rural District in Derbyshire
- The urban districts of Ramsbottom and Turton in Lancashire
- The urban district of Saddleworth in Yorkshire, West Riding

Despite the review area's name, much of it was in Cheshire. This was reflected in the area being referred to in later reviews as "South East Lancashire and North East Cheshire" or SELNEC. Although no local government reforms were made under the 1958 act, a SELNEC passenger transport authority was formed in 1969. A metropolitan county of Greater Manchester was formed in 1974 for a similar area to the SRA, although it excluded Alderley Edge, Disley and Wilmslow, and added Wigan.

=== Merseyside ===
- The county boroughs of Birkenhead, Bootle, Liverpool and Wallasey
- Part of Cheshire, namely: the municipal boroughs of Bebington and Ellesmere Port, and the urban districts of Hoylake, Neston and Wirral
- Part of Lancashire, namely: the municipal borough of Crosby, the urban districts of Huyton-with-Roby, Kirkby and Litherland, and the civil parishes of Aintree and Simonswood in the West Lancashire Rural District.

The area was extended by the Merseyside Special Review Area Order 1965 to include:

- the municipal borough of Widnes, the urban districts of Formby and Prescot, more of West Lancashire RD (the parishes of Altcar, Downholland, Ince Blundell, Lydiate, Maghull, Melling, Netherton, Sefton and Thornton), and part of Whiston Rural District (the parishes of Cronton, Hale, Halewood, Knowsley, Rainhill, Tarbock and Whiston) in Lancashire;
- The urban district of Runcorn, part of Runcorn Rural District (the parishes of Frodsham, Halton, Helsby, Norton and Sutton; and the parts of the parishes of Aston, Daresbury, Moore and Preston Brook within the designated area of Runcorn New Town), and part of Chester Rural District (the parishes of Elton, Hapsford, Litle Stunney, Stoke and Thonton-le-Moors) in Cheshire.

In 1974, a metropolitan county of Merseyside was formed which had a different area than the act SRA. While excluding Ellesmere Port and Neston, which remained in Cheshire, the 1974 boundaries included much more of Lancashire, including Formby, St Helens and Southport.

=== West Midlands ===
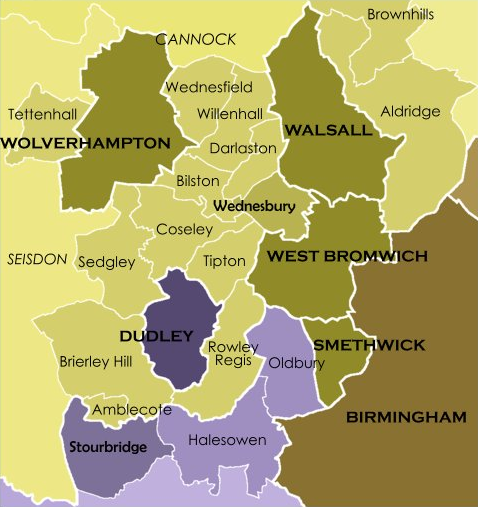
The local government structure within North Worcestershire and South Staffordshire – Prior to the West Midlands Order 1965 reorganisation

- The county boroughs of Birmingham, Dudley, Smethwick, Walsall, West Bromwich and Wolverhampton
- Part of Staffordshire, namely: the municipal boroughs of Bilston, Rowley Regis, Tipton and Wednesbury, and the urban districts of Aldridge, Amblecote, Brierley Hill, Brownhills, Coseley, Darlaston, Sedgley, Tettenhall, Wednesfield and Willenhall
- Part of Warwickshire, namely: the municipal boroughs of Solihull and Sutton Coldfield, and the civil parishes of Castle Bromwich and Kingshurst in Meriden Rural District
- Part of Worcestershire, namely: the municipal boroughs of Halesowen, Oldbury and Stourbridge

In 1964, Solihull, with altered boundaries, became a county borough. In 1966, an order altering local government in much of the "Black Country" part of the SRA came into effect creating five large county boroughs of Dudley, Walsall, Warley, West Bromwich and Wolverhampton, which were also to share a police force, the West Midlands Constabulary. A West Midlands passenger transport authority, including Birmingham, was formed in 1969. In 1974, a larger metropolitan county was formed, including Coventry and the intervening countryside.

== Metropolitan area (Greater London) ==
The 1958 Act did not extend to the Greater London Conurbation (as defined by the Registrar General) where reform of local government was under consideration by the Royal Commission under Sir Edwin Herbert established in the previous year. The area excluded was defined in schedule 5 as:

- County of London
- Middlesex
- From Surrey
  - County Borough of Croydon
  - Municipal Borough of Barnes, Municipal Borough of Beddington and Wallington, Municipal Borough of Epsom and Ewell, Municipal Borough of Kingston upon Thames, Municipal Borough of Malden and Coombe, Municipal Borough of Mitcham, Municipal Borough of Richmond, Municipal Borough of Surbiton, Municipal Borough of Sutton and Cheam and the Municipal Borough of Wimbledon
  - Banstead Urban District, Carshalton Urban District, Caterham and Warlingham Urban District, Coulsdon and Purley Urban District, Esher Urban District, Merton and Morden Urban District and Walton and Weybridge Urban District
- From Kent
  - Municipal Borough of Beckenham, Municipal Borough of Bexley, Municipal Borough of Bromley, Municipal Borough of Dartford and Municipal Borough of Erith
  - Chislehurst and Sidcup Urban District, Crayford Urban District, Orpington Urban District and Penge Urban District
- From Hertfordshire
  - Municipal Borough of Watford
  - Barnet Urban District, Bushey Urban District, Cheshunt Urban District, Chorleywood Urban District, East Barnet Urban District and Rickmansworth Urban District
  - Elstree Rural District and the parish of Northaw in the Hatfield Rural District and the parishes of Aldenham and Watford Rural in the Watford Rural District
- From Essex
  - County Borough of East Ham, County Borough of West Ham
  - Municipal Borough of Barking, Municipal Borough of Chingford, Municipal Borough of Dagenham, Municipal Borough of Ilford, Municipal Borough of Leyton, Municipal Borough of Romford, Municipal Borough of Walthamstow and Municipal Borough of Wanstead and Woodford
  - Chigwell Urban District, Hornchurch Urban District and Waltham Holy Cross Urban District.

The commission delivered its report in 1960, and a much modified version of its proposals (excluding outlying districts) was enacted as the London Government Act 1963.

== Rural boroughs ==
A weakness in the county reviews carried out under the earlier Local Government Act 1929 had been that, unlike small urban districts, municipal boroughs of a similar size could not be merged or amalgamated into a surrounding rural district. This was addressed in the act, which gave the reviewing county council or local government commission the power to include a non-county borough in a rural district. However, some of the civic dignities of the borough corporation would be retained. The boroughs thus effected would be known as "boroughs included in rural districts", or as rural boroughs.

The concept of rural boroughs had originally been announced by Henry Brooke, Minister of Housing and Local Government in the House of Commons on 29 July 1957 when he said he was considering that in future rural districts could include "what might be called a rural borough or country borough with the mayoralty and corporate existence continuing so that the burgesses could go on enjoying the traditions and the corporate property which their predecessors had handed down".

Rural boroughs were no longer to be governed by the Municipal Corporations Act 1882, and the corporation was to consist entirely of elected councillors, from whose number a mayor and deputy mayor were to be chosen annually. The office of alderman was not to exist in rural boroughs. The council of a rural borough was required to continue to appoint a town clerk, and was permitted to employ such officers and servants as needed to discharge the functions of the borough. All provisions of the borough's charter not inconsistent with its new status were to remain in effect. Rural boroughs were prevented from applying for a new or amended charter, however. If the borough corporation so chose it could surrender its charter, and the borough would be converted into a civil parish governed by a parish council.

Seven rural boroughs were created, five of them in Shropshire:

- Bishop's Castle, to Clun and Bishop's Castle Rural District in 1967
- Bridgnorth, to Bridgnorth Rural District in 1967
- Lostwithiel, to St Austell Rural District in 1968
- Ludlow, to Ludlow Rural District in 1967
- South Molton, to South Molton Rural District in 1967
- Oswestry, to Oswestry Rural District in 1967
- Wenlock, to Bridgnorth Rural District in 1966

Rural boroughs were abolished in 1974 under the Local Government Act 1972, and converted to civil parishes.

== Reviews carried out under the act ==
Apart from the West Midlands review mentioned above, there were few large-scale changes brought about by the act:

- Bedfordshire, 1964 (Luton became county borough)
- Cornwall, 1968 (extensive changes to county districts and creation of one rural borough)
- Devon in 1967 (creation of Torbay county borough, other changes including creation of one rural borough)
- County Durham, 1967 (creation of Hartlepool county borough, enlargement of Sunderland)
- Herefordshire, 1968 (two urban districts absorbed by rural districts)
- Huntingdonshire, 1961 (union of boroughs of Huntingdon and Godmanchester)
- Union of administrative counties to create Huntingdon and Peterborough and Cambridgeshire and Isle of Ely in 1965
- Shropshire in 1967 and 1968 (extensive changes in county districts and creation of five rural boroughs)
- Teesside county borough, created 1968

No changes were made in Wales.

Major changes in Greater London that occurred in 1965 were carried out under the London Government Act 1963.

== End of the review process ==
Local Government (Termination of Reviews) Act 1967 (Note: Section 3(1).)
- Act of Parliament
- Parliament of the United Kingdom
- Long title: An Act to dissolve the Local Government Commission for England and the Local Government Commission for Wales, to provide (with retrospective effect) for the discontinuance of reviews under Part II of the Local Government Act 1958 and to repeal section 30(6) and certain related provisions of the London Government Act 1963.
- Citation: 1967 c. 18
- Territorial extent: England and Wales; Scotland; (Note: Section 3(2).)

Dates
- Royal assent: 10 May 1967
- Commencement: 10 May 1967
- Repealed: 27 May 1976
Other legislation
Amends	House of Commons Disqualification Act 1957; Local Government Act 1958; London Government Act 1963
Amended by	House of Commons Disqualification Act 1975
Repealed by	Statute Law (Repeals) Act 1976

Status: Repealed

Text of statute as originally enacted

The Local Government (Termination of Reviews) Act 1967 (c. 18) was an act of the Parliament of the United Kingdom which brought an end to the review process established by the 1958 act.

The 1967 act dissolved the two local government commissions, and ended the duty of county councils to review council areas. No report, proposals or notification made by the commissions or councils was to be carried into effect, if submitted after the beginning of 1963 by the Welsh commission, 10 February 1966 in the case of the English commission and 31 August 1966 by the county councils.

In the meantime, a Royal Commission on Local Government, (usually known as the Redcliffe-Maud Commission) had been appointed on 31 May 1966 to "consider the structure of Local Government in England, outside Greater London... and to make recommendations for authorities and boundaries, and for functions and their division.... The work of the Royal Commission led to a fundamental reorganisation of local councils in 1974 by the Local Government Act 1972.

== Subsequent developments ==
Section 58(2) of, and schedule 9 to, the act, together with words in section 56(1) and parts of schedule 8, were repealed by section 1 of, and part XI of the schedule to, the Statute Law (Repeals) Act 1974, which came into force on 27 June 1974.

Part I, schedule 1, and in Schedule 8, paragraphs 3–10 and 12–14, and in paragraph 35 the words " 1,", " 6," and " 17,", were repealed by section 1(1) of, and part VIII of the schedule to, the Statute Law (Repeals) Act 1975, which came into force on 13 March 1975.

== Bibliography ==
- Youngs F. A., Guide to the Local Administrative Units of England, 2 volumes, London, 1979 and 1991
