= Boraston =

Village and civil parish in Shropshire, England

Coordinates: 52.327°N 2.567°W

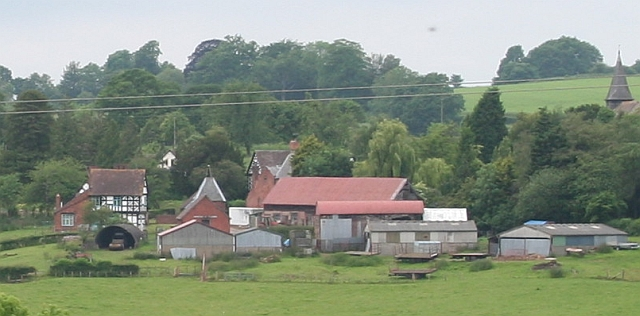
- The village of Boraston

- Location within Shropshire
- Population: 178 (2011)
- OS grid reference: SO613700
- Civil parish: Boraston
- Unitary authority: Shropshire
- Ceremonial county: Shropshire
- Region: West Midlands
- Country: England
- Sovereign state: United Kingdom
- Post town: Tenbury Wells
- Postcode district: WR15
- Dialling code: 01584
- Police: West Mercia
- Fire: Shropshire
- Ambulance: West Midlands
- UK Parliament: South Shropshire

Boraston is a village and civil parish in Shropshire, England. It is situated in the West Midlands, approximately 0.8 mi (1.3 km) north of Worcestershire and 10 mi (16 km) east of the Herefordshire border. Nearby villages include Tenbury Wells (2 mi [3.2 km]) and Burford (1.8 mi [2.9 km]); the nearest town is Kidderminster (17 mi [27 km]). Boraston is surrounded by countryside and is less than 1 mi (1.6 km) from the River Teme.

== History ==
Boraston is an historic village; the earliest record of its existence is found in the Domesday Book, a publication that detailed geographical locations as to describe and record England's farmland and stock. It notes that in 1750 "John Smith of Boraston (in Burford) had 20,000 poles worth £20 and hops worth £30".

British travel writer John Marius Wilson described Boraston in his topographical dictionary Imperial Gazetteer of England and Wales. 'BORASTON, a township-chapelry in Burford parish, Salop; at the verge of the county, on the river Teme, the Kington canal, and the Tenbury railway, 1 mile W[est] of Tenbury. Post Town, Tenbury. Rated property, £1,141. Pop[ulation]., 235. Houses, 39. The property is divided among a few. The living is a p[erpetual]. curacy annexed to the rectory of Burford, in the diocese of Hereford. The church is tolerable'.

Boraston Church dates from the 13th century and has no recorded dedication. The nearby church at Nash, which also belongs to the Tenbury Team Ministry, is dedicated to St John the Baptist. The church has some Norman (1066–1154) features notably a blocked doorway. The building is described as having 'spiral fluting on part of the bowl; probably c.1700', it also claims that the font originates from nearby village Buildwas. Between the years 1884 and 1887 it was renovated by architect Henry Curzon; he made changes to its exterior and enlarged it.

== Population and employment ==
According to the 2001 United Kingdom census, Boraston had a population of 200 people, with a total of 75 households.

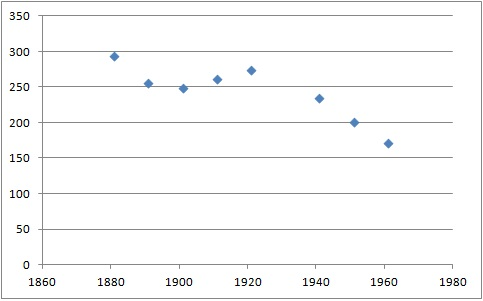
Population change in Boraston from 1860 to 1960.

Between 1914 and 1918, population in the UK declined as a result of the First World War; however Boraston bucked this trend instead showing a slight increase in population. However, as more men (approximately 5 million) were called up to serve in the forces for The Second World War (1939–1945), Boraston saw an incline in numbers, a possible reason for this could be the intake of evacuees. Unlike the rest of the country Boraston also failed to see an incline in population as a result of the post-war 'baby boom', whereby nationally birth rates increased in the period from 1946 to 1974.

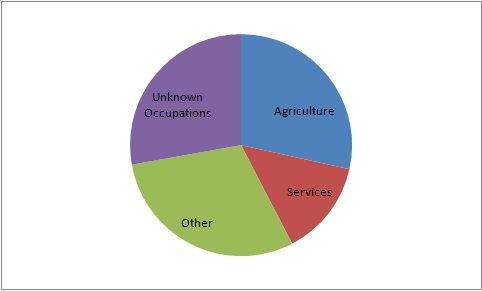
Categories of employment Boraston 1881

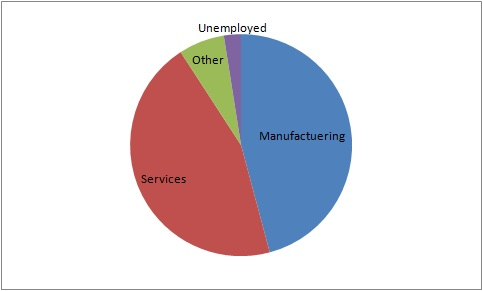
Categories of employment Boraston 2001

Unlike the 1881 Census data agricultural employment is now barely existent in the village due to the fact that food is now transported nationwide rather than just locally and the UK imports much of its produce, furthermore advancement in technology means less staff are required. Increasing service and manufacturing employment makes up 93.3% of Boraston's occupational categories. The increase in manufacturing reflects a more industrialised economy, despite the 1811 Census data being recorded in the time of Industrial Revolution; Boraston had little involvement as a small remote community with a small work force. An increase in services as an occupational category also reflects the UK's shift from primary production to having an increased tertiary sector of the economy.

The 2001 Census shows that the average distance travelled to work by a Boraston resident is 23.65 km (14.7 miles), this suggests that most people now commute outside the village as working in Boraston is not economically viable.

== Governance, transport, and amenities ==
Previously in the Ludlow constituency, Boraston is in the present South Shropshire seat of the UK Parliament. Boraston's current Member of Parliament is Stuart Anderson who held the seat for the Conservative Party in the 2024 General Election. Prior to Brexit in 2020 it was part of the West Midlands constituency for the European Parliament.

In Boraston itself the only public transport is a bus service that starts at Worcester Bus Station and finishes at the second stop in Tenbury Wells with various villages in between, including Boraston. The nearest train station is Ludlow station, which is 7.03 miles (11.31 km) from Boraston, followed by the next nearest Leominster at 9.87 mi (15.88 km). In terms of road access the A456 road which runs between Birmingham and Woofferton, is a mile south of Boraston.

Boraston motocross circuit is located on the outskirts of the village and is a popular track for racers and fans of the sport holding motocross championship races.

== See also ==
- Listed buildings in Boraston
