= North Shropshire =

Former local government district in England

Coordinates: 52.856°N 2.723°W

North Shropshire District
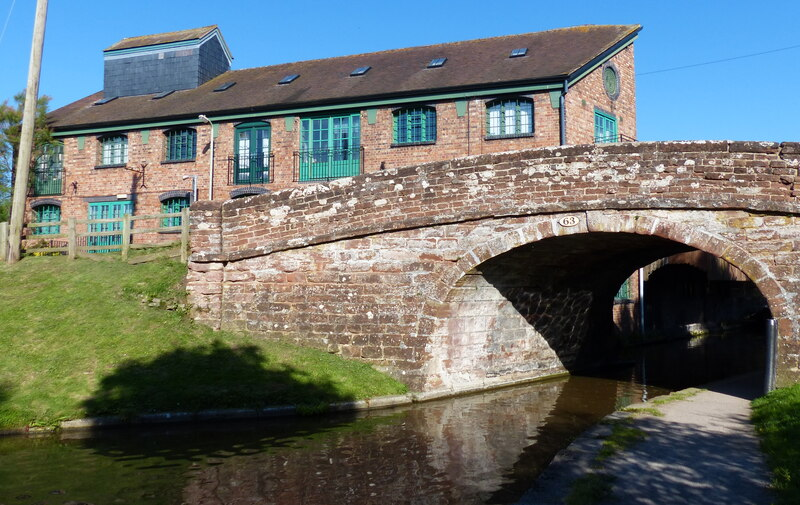
- Betton Mill on the Shropshire Union Canal at Market Drayton

- Shown within Shropshire
- History
  - Origin: Market Drayton Rural District; North Shropshire Rural District
  - Created: 1 April 1974
  - Abolished: 31 March 2009
  - Succeeded by: Shropshire
- Status: District
- ONS code: 39UC
- Government: North Shropshire District Council
  - HQ: Wem

North Shropshire was a local government district in Shropshire, England from 1974 to 2009. The district council was based at Edinburgh House in Wem. Other settlements included the towns of Ellesmere, Market Drayton and Whitchurch, as well as the large villages of Shawbury and Baschurch. The district bordered onto Wales, Cheshire and Staffordshire as well as the Shropshire districts of Oswestry, Shrewsbury and Atcham and the unitary Telford and Wrekin.

== History ==
The district was formed on 1 April 1974, under the Local Government Act 1972, by a merger of Market Drayton Rural District and North Shropshire Rural District.

The district and its council were abolished as part of the 2009 structural changes to local government in England. Its functions were taken over from 1 April 2009 by Shropshire County Council, which was renamed Shropshire Council at the same time.

== Parishes and settlements ==
The district council classified Wem, Market Drayton, Whitchurch and Ellesmere as the market towns of North Shropshire, while it gave the classification of "main service villages" to Baschurch, Cheswardine, Clive, Cockshutt, Dudleston Heath, Hadnall, Hinstock, Hodnet, Prees, Shawbury, Tilstock, Welshampton and Woore. The district also included many other smaller villages and hamlets.

Map of civil parishes in North Shropshire

The district contained the following civil parishes:

- Adderley
- Baschurch
- Cheswardine, Child's Ercall, Clive, Cockshutt
- Ellesmere Rural, Ellesmere Urban
- Grinshill
- Hadnall, Hinstock, Hodnet, Hordley
- Ightfield
- Loppington
- Market Drayton, Moreton Corbet and Lee Brockhurst, Moreton Say, Myddle and Broughton
- Norton in Hales
- Petton, Prees
- Shawbury, Stanton upon Hine Heath, Stoke upon Tern, Sutton upon Tern
- Welshampton and Lyneal, Wem Rural, Wem Urban, Weston-under-Redcastle, Whitchurch Rural, Whitchurch Urban, Whixall, Woore

== Infrastructure ==
The main roads in the district were the A41, A49 and the A53. There were no motorways.

There were four railway stations in the district: (Yorton, Wem, Prees and Whitchurch), all on the Welsh Marches Line. The Shrewsbury to Chester Line ran through the district as well, but the only station on that section of the line within North Shropshire had been at Baschurch, which had closed in 1965, prior to the district's creation. The Shropshire Union Canal and Ellesmere Canal/Llangollen Canal both ran through the district.

== Governance ==
=== Political control ===
The first elections to the council were held in 1973, initially operating as a shadow authority until the new arrangements came into effect on 1 April 1974. Political control of the council from 1974 until its abolition in 2009 was as follows:

Party in control	Years
Independent	1974–2003
No overall control	2003–2007
Conservative	2007–2009

=== Leadership ===
The last leader of the council was David Minnery, a Conservative.

Councillor	Party	From	To
David Minnery	Conservative		31 Mar 2009

=== Premises ===
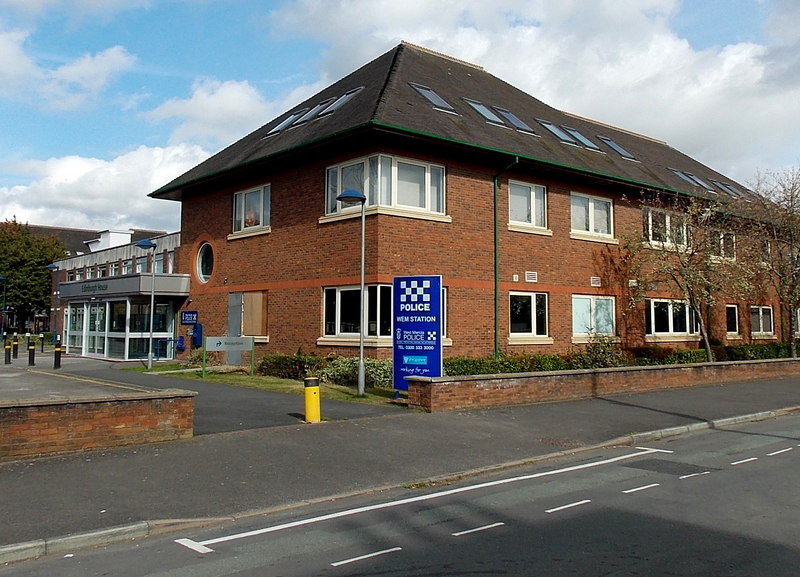
Edinburgh House, New Street, Wem

When created in 1974, the council inherited various offices from its predecessors, including a relatively new office building on New Street in Wem, which had been completed in 1970 for the old North Shropshire Rural District Council. That building was extended in the late 1980s to allow the council's offices to be consolidated there. The extended building was formally re-opened by Prince Philip, Duke of Edinburgh on 21 July 1989, when it was renamed Edinburgh House in recognition of his visit. On the council's abolition in 2009, Edinburgh House passed to Shropshire Council, which subsequently sold it to a housing association in 2013.

== Council elections ==
- 1973 North Shropshire District Council election
- 1976 North Shropshire District Council election (New ward boundaries)
- 1979 North Shropshire District Council election
- 1983 North Shropshire District Council election
- 1987 North Shropshire District Council election
- 1991 North Shropshire District Council election (District boundary changes took place but the number of seats remained the same)
- 1995 North Shropshire District Council election
- 1999 North Shropshire District Council election
- 2003 North Shropshire District Council election (New ward boundaries)
- 2007 North Shropshire District Council election

=== Results maps ===
2003 results map

2007 results map

=== By-election results ===
Market Drayton North By-Election 3 October 1996
Party	Candidate	Votes	%	±%
Labour		405	61.9	
Conservative		249	38.1	
Majority		156	23.8	
Turnout		634	23.2	
Labour hold		Swing		

Prees By-Election 19 November 1998
Party	Candidate	Votes	%	±%
Conservative		277	55.4	
Independent		233	46.6	
Majority		44	8.8	
Turnout		510	23.0	
Conservative gain from Independent		Swing		

Wem Rural By-Election 22 June 2000
Party	Candidate	Votes	%	±%
Conservative		290	82.9	
Independent		60	17.1	
Majority		230	65.8	
Turnout		350	40.0	
Conservative hold		Swing		

Sutton By-Election 27 July 2000
Party	Candidate	Votes	%	±%
Conservative		111	55.2	
Independent		66	32.8	
Independent		24	11.9	
Majority		45	22.4	
Turnout		201	32.0	
Conservative gain from Independent		Swing		

Weston Rhyn By-Election 26 April 2001
Party	Candidate	Votes	%	±%
Liberal Democrats		369	60.8	
Independent		238	39.2	
Majority		131	21.6	
Turnout		607	31.4	
Liberal Democrats gain from Labour		Swing		

Clive By-Election 13 September 2001
Party	Candidate	Votes	%	±%
Conservative		unopposed		
Conservative gain from Liberal Democrats		Swing		

Whitchurch South By-Election 6 October 2005
Party	Candidate	Votes	%	±%
Conservative	Gerald Dakin	204	51.6	+24.5
Independent	Andrew Richardson	191	48.4	+2.6
Majority		13	3.2	
Turnout		395	17.4	
Conservative gain from Independent		Swing		

Hordley, Tetchill and Lyncal By-Election 19 October 2006
Party	Candidate	Votes	%	±%
Conservative	Stephen Davenport	169	59.7	
Independent	William Lewis	74	26.1	
Independent	Jennifer Wright	40	14.1	
Majority		95	33.6	
Turnout		283	26.5	
Conservative gain from Independent		Swing		

== See also ==
- North Shropshire constituency - the name of the UK Parliament constituency which covers the former North Shropshire district and also the former Oswestry borough.
