= Whitton, Shropshire =

Coordinates: 52.349°N 2.623°W

Whitton
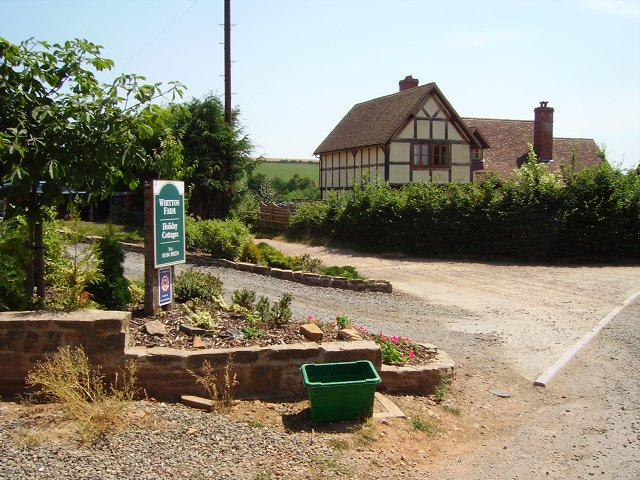
- House in Whitton

- Location within Shropshire
- Population: 239 (2011)
- OS grid reference: SO575725
- Civil parish: Whitton
- Unitary authority: Shropshire
- Ceremonial county: Shropshire
- Region: West Midlands
- Country: England
- Sovereign state: United Kingdom
- Post town: Ludlow
- Postcode district: SY8
- Dialling code: 01584
- Police: West Mercia
- Fire: Shropshire
- Ambulance: West Midlands
- UK Parliament: Ludlow

Whitton is a hamlet and civil parish in Shropshire, England.

It is situated east of Caynham and the market town of Ludlow is 5.2 miles (8.4 km) away. There is a parish church in the hamlet.

Whitton Court is a grade I listed manor house dating from 1611, previously the home of Lord Mayor of London Sebastian Harvey, and members of the Charlton family.

The Norman village church, St Mary The Virgin, is notable for stained-glass by Sir Edward Burne-Jones and Morris & Co. of c. 1893 and 1912 in the east window.

== See also ==
- Listed buildings in Whitton, Shropshire
