= Listed buildings in Shropshire =

There are a number of listed buildings in Shropshire. The term "listed building", in the United Kingdom, refers to a building or structure designated as being of special architectural, historical, or cultural significance. Details of all the listed buildings are contained in the National Heritage List for England. They are categorised in three grades: Grade I consists of buildings of outstanding architectural or historical interest, Grade II* includes significant buildings of more than local interest and Grade II consists of buildings of special architectural or historical interest. Buildings in England are listed by the Secretary of State for Culture, Media and Sport on recommendations provided by English Heritage, which also determines the grading.

Some listed buildings are looked after by the National Trust or English Heritage while others are in private ownership or administered by trusts.

== Listed buildings by grade ==
- Grade I listed buildings in Shropshire
- Grade II* listed buildings in Shropshire (district) (A–G)
- Grade II* listed buildings in Shropshire (district) (H–Z)
- Grade II* listed buildings in Telford and Wrekin

== Listed buildings by civil parish ==
=== Shropshire ===
- Listed buildings in Abdon, Shropshire
- Listed buildings in Acton Burnell
- Listed buildings in Acton Round
- Listed buildings in Acton Scott
- Listed buildings in Adderley
- Listed buildings in Alberbury with Cardeston
- Listed buildings in Albrighton, Bridgnorth
- Listed buildings in All Stretton
- Listed buildings in Alveley
- Listed buildings in Ashford Bowdler
- Listed buildings in Ashford Carbonell
- Listed buildings in Astley, Shropshire
- Listed buildings in Astley Abbotts
- Listed buildings in Aston Botterell
- Listed buildings in Aston Eyre
- Listed buildings in Atcham
- Listed buildings in Badger, Shropshire
- Listed buildings in Barrow, Shropshire
- Listed buildings in Baschurch
- Listed buildings in Bayston Hill
- Listed buildings in Bedstone
- Listed buildings in Beckbury
- Listed buildings in Berrington, Shropshire
- Listed buildings in Bettws-y-Crwyn
- Listed buildings in Bicton, Shrewsbury
- Listed buildings in Billingsley, Shropshire
- Listed buildings in Bishop's Castle
- Listed buildings in Bitterley
- Listed buildings in Boningale
- Listed buildings in Boraston
- Listed buildings in Boscobel
- Listed buildings in Bridgnorth
- Listed buildings in Bromfield, Shropshire
- Listed buildings in Broseley
- Listed buildings in Bucknell, Shropshire
- Listed buildings in Buildwas
- Listed buildings in Burford, Shropshire
- Listed buildings in Burwarton
- Listed buildings in Cardington, Shropshire
- Listed buildings in Caynham
- Listed buildings in Chelmarsh
- Listed buildings in Cheswardine
- Listed buildings in Chetton
- Listed buildings in Child's Ercall
- Listed buildings in Chirbury with Brompton
- Listed buildings in Church Preen
- Listed buildings in Church Pulverbatch
- Listed buildings in Church Stretton
- Listed buildings in Claverley
- Listed buildings in Clee St. Margaret
- Listed buildings in Cleobury Mortimer
- Listed buildings in Cleobury North
- Listed buildings in Clive, Shropshire
- Listed buildings in Clun
- Listed buildings in Clunbury
- Listed buildings in Clungunford
- Listed buildings in Cockshutt, Shropshire
- Listed buildings in Colebatch, Shropshire
- Listed buildings in Condover
- Listed buildings in Coreley
- Listed buildings in Cound
- Listed buildings in Craven Arms
- Listed buildings in Cressage
- Listed buildings in Culmington
- Listed buildings in Deuxhill
- Listed buildings in Diddlebury
- Listed buildings in Ditton Priors
- Listed buildings in Donington, Shropshire
- Listed buildings in Eardington
- Listed buildings in Easthope
- Listed buildings in Eaton-under-Heywood
- Listed buildings in Edgton
- Listed buildings in Ellesmere Rural
- Listed buildings in Ellesmere Urban
- Listed buildings in Farlow, Shropshire
- Listed buildings in Ford, Shropshire
- Listed buildings in Frodesley
- Listed buildings in Glazeley
- Listed buildings in Great Hanwood
- Listed buildings in Great Ness
- Listed buildings in Greete
- Listed buildings in Grinshill
- Listed buildings in Hadnall
- Listed buildings in Harley, Shropshire
- Listed buildings in Heath, Shropshire
- Listed buildings in Highley
- Listed buildings in Hinstock
- Listed buildings in Hodnet
- Listed buildings in Hope Bagot
- Listed buildings in Hope Bowdler
- Listed buildings in Hopesay
- Listed buildings in Hopton Cangeford
- Listed buildings in Hopton Castle
- Listed buildings in Hopton Wafers
- Listed buildings in Hordley
- Listed buildings in Hughley, Shropshire
- Listed buildings in Ightfield
- Listed buildings in Kemberton
- Listed buildings in Kenley, Shropshire
- Listed buildings in Kinlet
- Listed buildings in Kinnerley
- Listed buildings in Knockin
- Listed buildings in Leebotwood
- Listed buildings in Leighton and Eaton Constantine
- Listed buildings in Little Ness
- Listed buildings in Llanfair Waterdine
- Listed buildings in Llanyblodwel
- Listed buildings in Llanymynech and Pant
- Listed buildings in Longden
- Listed buildings in Longnor, Shropshire
- Listed buildings in Loppington
- Listed buildings in Ludford, Shropshire
- Listed buildings in Ludlow (northern area)
- Listed buildings in Ludlow (southern area)
- Listed buildings in Lydbury North
- Listed buildings in Lydham
- Listed buildings in Mainstone
- Listed buildings in Market Drayton
- Listed buildings in Melverley
- Listed buildings in Middleton Scriven
- Listed buildings in Milson, Shropshire
- Listed buildings in Minsterley
- Listed buildings in Monkhopton
- Listed buildings in Montford, Shropshire
- Listed buildings in More, Shropshire
- Listed buildings in Moreton Corbet and Lee Brockhurst
- Listed buildings in Moreton Say
- Listed buildings in Morville, Shropshire
- Listed buildings in Much Wenlock
- Listed buildings in Munslow
- Listed buildings in Myddle and Broughton
- Listed buildings in Myndtown
- Listed buildings in Nash, South Shropshire
- Listed buildings in Neen Savage
- Listed buildings in Neen Sollars
- Listed buildings in Neenton
- Listed buildings in Newcastle on Clun
- Listed buildings in Norbury, Shropshire
- Listed buildings in Norton in Hales
- Listed buildings in Onibury
- Listed buildings in Oswestry
- Listed buildings in Oswestry Rural
- Listed buildings in Petton
- Listed buildings in Pimhill
- Listed buildings in Pitchford
- Listed buildings in Pontesbury
- Listed buildings in Prees
- Listed buildings in Quatt Malvern
- Listed buildings in Ratlinghope
- Listed buildings in Richard's Castle (Shropshire)
- Listed buildings in Romsley, Shropshire
- Listed buildings in Ruckley and Langley
- Listed buildings in Rudge, Shropshire
- Listed buildings in Rushbury
- Listed buildings in Ruyton-XI-Towns
- Listed buildings in Ryton, Shropshire
- Listed buildings in Selattyn and Gobowen
- Listed buildings in Shawbury
- Listed buildings in Sheinton
- Listed buildings in Sheriffhales
- Listed buildings in Shifnal
- Listed buildings in Shipton, Shropshire
- Listed buildings in Shrewsbury (northwest central area)
- Listed buildings in Shrewsbury (southeast central area)
- Listed buildings in Shrewsbury (outer areas)
- Listed buildings in Sibdon Carwood
- Listed buildings in Sidbury, Shropshire
- Listed buildings in Smethcott
- Listed buildings in St Martin's, Shropshire
- Listed buildings in Stanton Lacy
- Listed buildings in Stanton Long
- Listed buildings in Stanton upon Hine Heath
- Listed buildings in Stockton, Worfield
- Listed buildings in Stoke St. Milborough
- Listed buildings in Stoke upon Tern
- Listed buildings in Stottesdon
- Listed buildings in Stowe, Shropshire
- Listed buildings in Sutton Maddock
- Listed buildings in Sutton upon Tern
- Listed buildings in Tasley
- Listed buildings in Tong, Shropshire
- Listed buildings in Uffington, Shropshire
- Listed buildings in Upton Cressett
- Listed buildings in Upton Magna
- Listed buildings in Welshampton and Lyneal
- Listed buildings in Wem Rural
- Listed buildings in Wem Urban
- Listed buildings in Wentnor
- Listed buildings in West Felton
- Listed buildings in Westbury, Shropshire
- Listed buildings in Weston Rhyn
- Listed buildings in Weston-under-Redcastle
- Listed buildings in Wheathill
- Listed buildings in Whitchurch Rural
- Listed buildings in Whitchurch Urban
- Listed buildings in Whittington, Shropshire
- Listed buildings in Whitton, Shropshire
- Listed buildings in Whixall
- Listed buildings in Wistanstow
- Listed buildings in Withington, Shropshire
- Listed buildings in Woolstaston
- Listed buildings in Woore
- Listed buildings in Worfield
- Listed buildings in Worthen with Shelve
- Listed buildings in Wroxeter and Uppington

==== Telford and Wrekin ====
- Listed buildings in Chetwynd, Shropshire
- Listed buildings in Chetwynd Aston and Woodcote
- Listed buildings in Church Aston
- Listed buildings in Dawley Hamlets
- Listed buildings in Edgmond
- Listed buildings in Ercall Magna
- Listed buildings in Eyton upon the Weald Moors
- Listed buildings in Great Dawley
- Listed buildings in Hadley and Leegomery
- Listed buildings in Ketley
- Listed buildings in Kynnersley
- Listed buildings in Lawley and Overdale
- Listed buildings in Lilleshall and Donnington
- Listed buildings in Little Wenlock
- Listed buildings in Madeley, Shropshire
- Listed buildings in Newport, Shropshire
- Listed buildings in Oakengates
- Listed buildings in Preston upon the Weald Moors
- Listed buildings in Rodington, Shropshire
- Listed buildings in St George's and Priorslee
- Listed buildings in Stirchley and Brookside
- Listed buildings in The Gorge
- Listed buildings in Tibberton and Cherrington
- Listed buildings in Waters Upton
- Listed buildings in Wellington, Shropshire
- Listed buildings in Wrockwardine
- Listed buildings in Wrockwardine Wood and Trench

== Churches ==
- Grade I listed churches in Shropshire
