= Sutton Maddock =

Village in Shropshire, England

Coordinates: 52.609941°N 2.4103779°W

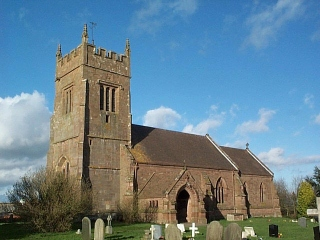

- Location within Shropshire
- Area: 10.21 km^{2} (3.94 sq mi)
- Population: 254 (2011 census)
  - Density: 25/km^{2} (65/sq mi)
- Civil parish: Sutton Maddock
- Unitary authority: Shropshire
- Ceremonial county: Shropshire
- Region: West Midlands
- Country: England
- Sovereign state: United Kingdom
- Police: West Mercia
- Fire: Shropshire
- Ambulance: West Midlands
- Website: https://www.hugofox.com/community/sutton-maddock-parish-council-10144/home/

Sutton Maddock is a village and civil parish 16 miles (26 km) south east of Shrewsbury, in the Shropshire district, in the county of Shropshire, England. The parish includes the hamlet of Brockton. In 2011 the parish had a population of 254. The parish touches Barrow, Beckbury, Broseley, The Gorge, Kemberton, Madeley, Ryton and Stockton.

== Landmarks ==
There are 5 listed buildings in Sutton Maddock. Sutton Maddock has a church called St Mary.

== History ==
The name "Sutton" means 'south farm/settlement' and "Madoc" being the personal name of 3 generations of a family which held the manor in the 12th and 13th centuries. Sutton Maddock was recorded in the Domesday Book as Sudtone.
