= Sidbury, Shropshire =

Village in Shropshire, England

Coordinates: 52.467417°N 2.466578°W

Sidbury
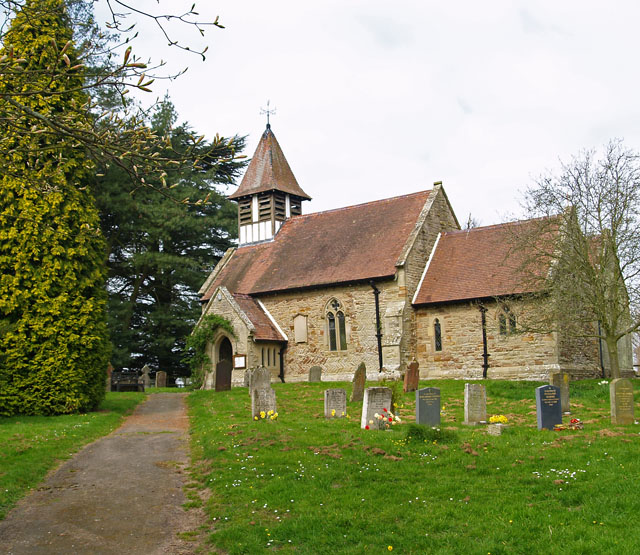

- Location within Shropshire
- Area: 5.20 km^{2} (2.01 sq mi)
- Population: 32 (2001 census)
  - Density: 6/km^{2} (16/sq mi)
- OS grid reference: SO684856
- Civil parish: Sidbury
- Unitary authority: Shropshire
- Ceremonial county: Shropshire
- Region: West Midlands
- Country: England
- Sovereign state: United Kingdom
- Post town: Bridgnorth
- Postcode district: WV16
- Police: West Mercia
- Fire: Shropshire
- Ambulance: West Midlands
- UK Parliament: Ludlow

Sidbury is a village and civil parish 21 miles (34 km) south-east of Shrewsbury, in the Shropshire district, in the ceremonial county of Shropshire, England. In 2001 the parish had a population of 32. Sidbury shared a parish council with Stottesdon. The parish touches Stottesdon, Deuxhill, Middleton Scriven and Billingsley.

== Features ==
There are nine listed buildings in Sidbury. Sidbury has a church called Holy Trinity Church.

== History ==
The name Sidbury means "south fortification". Sidbury was recorded in the Domesday Book as Sudberie. There are earthworks of Sidbury deserted medieval village.
