= Tasley =

Tasley may refer to:

- Tasley, Shropshire, England, United Kingdom, a village and civil parish
- Tasley, Virginia, United States, a census-designated place
