= Edgton =

Village in Shropshire, England

Coordinates: 52.466°N 2.903°W

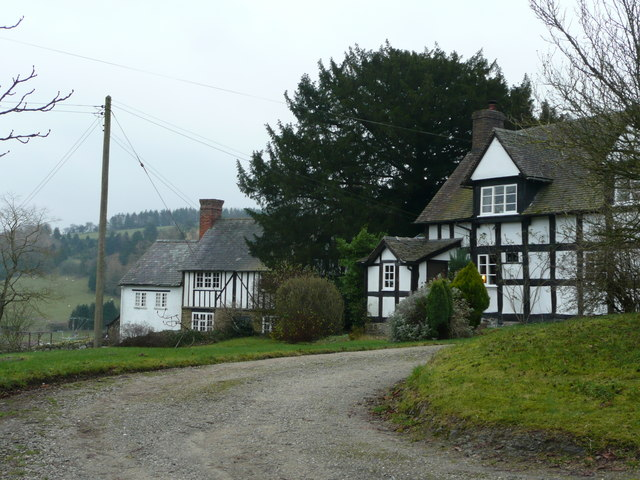
- Half-timbered houses in Edgton

- Location within Shropshire
- OS grid reference: SO386857
- Civil parish: Edgton
- Unitary authority: Shropshire
- Ceremonial county: Shropshire
- Region: West Midlands
- Country: England
- Sovereign state: United Kingdom
- Post town: CRAVEN ARMS
- Postcode district: SY7
- Dialling code: 01588
- Police: West Mercia
- Fire: Shropshire
- Ambulance: West Midlands
- UK Parliament: Ludlow

Edgton is a small village and civil parish in Shropshire, England. It is also an ecclesiastical parish and a chapelry. It lies in a rather remote and very rural area, south of the River Onny. The nearest market towns are Bishop's Castle, Craven Arms, Clun and Church Stretton, while the larger village of Lydbury North lies a few miles to the west. It is located 4 miles west of Craven Arms and is positioned on the former stagecoach route from London to Bishop's Castle.

== The village ==
The village of Edgton contains 3 farms and approximately 20 dwellings. It has very few services as the school (built in 1872), the shop and the village public house were all closed down. The school is currently used as a pottery. The village is fairly compact as it is centred on the 3 farms and the church.

Edgton is home to St Michael's church which was established in the early 13th century. It was rebuilt in 1895-6 and is now a grade II listed building. Before the church was renovated it had fallen into a state of disrepair. Reverend Jones spent £250 of his own money on the repairs and £50 was contributed from the Ecclesiastical Commission. It is a small and intimate church, containing traditional carved box pews and a recently renovated chamber organ.

Instead of a parish council it has a parish meeting; this is due to the very small population of the parish.

Edgton is believed to mean a "settlement on a hill with an edge or brow".

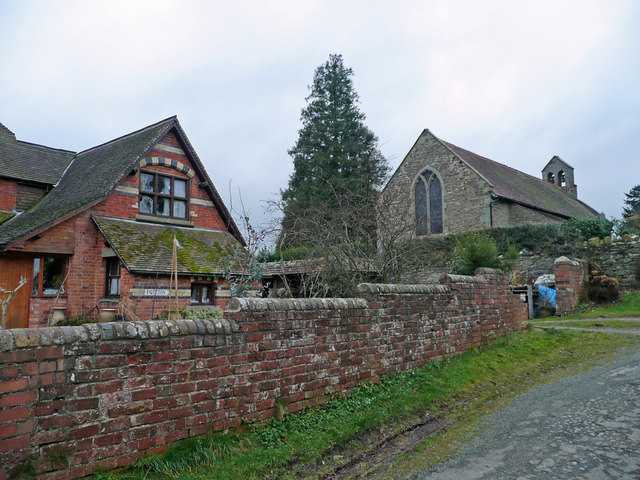
St Michael's Church and the Pottery in Edgton

== Conservation area ==
On 16 December 1993, the central part of Edgton was designated a conservation area. Edgton is located within the Shropshire Hills Area of Outstanding Natural Beauty. The area is made up of a large amount of woodland and arable and pasture land. The natural features of the village such as the mature trees, hedges, stone walls and historic boundaries are very important and need to be preserved.

The following buildings and landmarks are regarded as monuments in the Edgton Conservation Area:

- The Church of St Michael
- The Sundial 2m south west of Church of St Michael
- The pedestal tomb 6m south west of Church of St Michael
- Manor Farmhouse
- Church Farmhouse (former malt house)
- The Barn 5m south east of church Farmhouse
- The Cowhouse 10m south west of Church Farmhouse
- The House on the Green (a 1-storey cottage)
- Edgton Farmhouse
- Villa Farmhouse
- Lower House Farmhouse and attached cowhouse

Almost all of these places are Grade II listed to help to protect them.

== History ==
Historical population
Year	Pop.	±%
1801	188	—
1811	210	+11.7%
1821	220	+4.8%
1831	232	+5.5%
1841	214	−7.8%
1851	191	−10.7%
1881	223	+16.8%
1891	185	−17.0%
1901	134	−27.6%
1911	166	+23.9%
1921	132	−20.5%
1931	134	+1.5%
1951	90	−32.8%
1961	86	−4.4%

Edgton was part of Clun registration district, Clun and Bishops Castle registration district, Lydbury registration sub-district and the Purslow hundred. Edgton used to belong to the ancient monastery of Wenlock Priory. The Reverend Humphrey Sandford bought Edgton in 1812 for £235, so this is when it became a state parish. At the edge of the village there is the Anglo-Saxon church, which in the past allowed travellers to rest at night without disturbing the residents. There is a road which runs nearby the village at Edgton Cross, which has a 19th-century milestone showing that London is 154 miles away and that Bishop's Castle is 5 miles away. There are many milestones along this road, which suggests that it was an important access route in the past.

Occupations in Edgton in 1831, males aged 20 and over:
1. Farmers employing labourers (11.3%)
2. Farmers not employing labourers (3.23%)
3. Agricultural labourers (53.2%)
4. Manufacturing (1.61%)
5. Retail & Handicrafts (24.2%)
6. Labourers (non-agricultural) (6.45%)

== See also ==
- Listed buildings in Edgton
