= Burwarton =

Village in Shropshire, England

Coordinates: 52.462°N 2.562°W

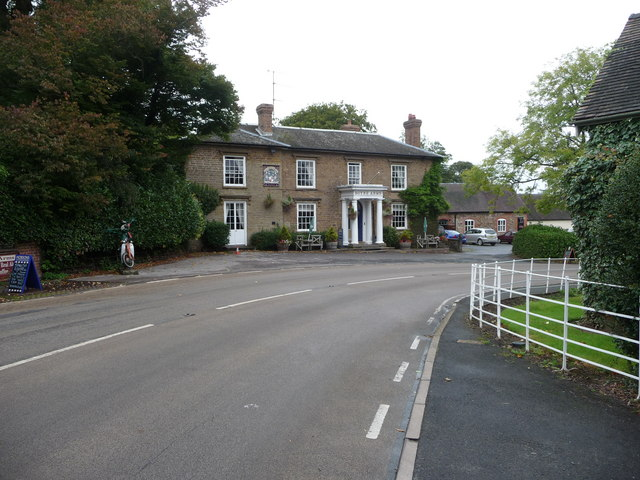
- The Boyne Arms public house, Burwarton

- Location within Shropshire
- Population: 233 (2011)
- OS grid reference: SO618850
- Civil parish: Burwarton
- Unitary authority: Shropshire
- Ceremonial county: Shropshire
- Region: West Midlands
- Country: England
- Sovereign state: United Kingdom
- Post town: Bridgnorth
- Postcode district: WV16
- Dialling code: 01746
- Police: West Mercia
- Fire: Shropshire
- Ambulance: West Midlands
- UK Parliament: Ludlow

Burwarton is a small village and civil parish in Shropshire, England.

Local governance is provided through the 'grouped' Parish Council for Aston Botterill, Burwarton and Cleobury North, and the parish falls within the Brown Clee Division of the Shropshire Unitary Council. There is no village meeting place, but the combined parishes share the facilities of the Village Hall at Cleobury North. The Burwarton Parish embraces most of the "home estate" around Burwarton House. This rises westward from the main Bridgnorth-Ludlow road, passing north–south through the village, up to the ridge summit of Brown Clee Hill. Burwarton House is the seat of Viscount Boyne, whose family gives its name to the village pub, the Boyne Arms.

== Notable landmarks and events ==
Nearby are Burwarton Cottage, owned by the Scout organisation, and the Wenlock Hills. The Shropshire Way passes along the western border of the parish close to the Brown Clee summit. Orienteering and mountain bike events take place periodically. The famous annual Burwarton Show has its offices here, although the show is actually held in the adjacent village of Cleobury North. Public footpaths criss-cross the parish and the Boyne Estate. Hiking route information is also available from links on the website of the Boyne Arms at .

Burwarton's former Parish Church is now a private residence.

== See also ==
- Listed buildings in Burwarton
