= Monkhopton =

Village and civil parish in Shropshire, England

Coordinates: 52°32′N 2°34′W

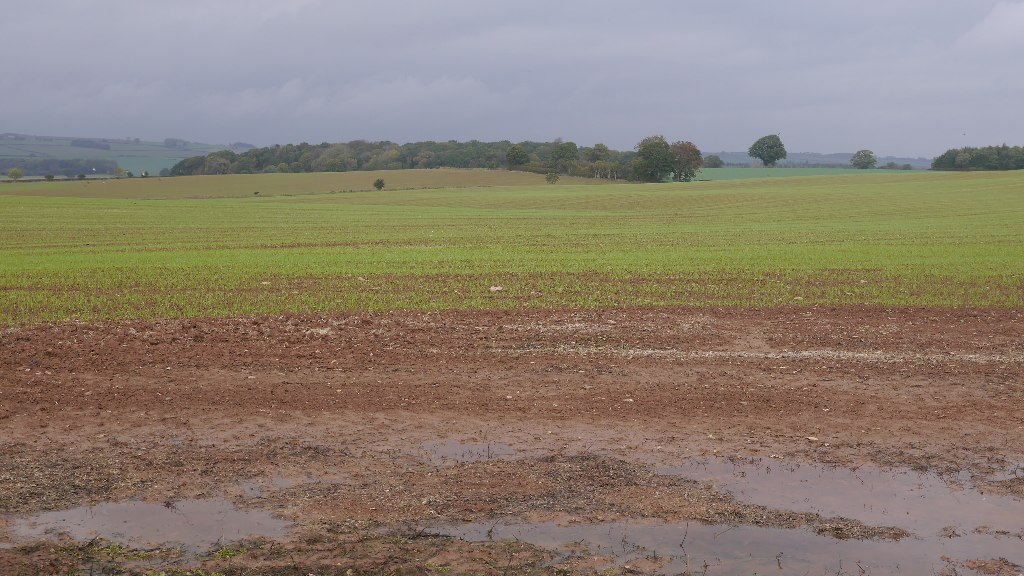
Winter cereals in Monkhopton

Monkhopton is a village and civil parish in Shropshire, England. It is 6.5 miles south of Much Wenlock. There is an Anglican church: Its co-ordinates are 52:32.2836N 2:33.2589W.

== See also ==
- Listed buildings in Monkhopton
