= Rudge, Shropshire =

Civil parish in Shropshire, England

Coordinates: 52.573213°N 2.2806029°W

Rudge
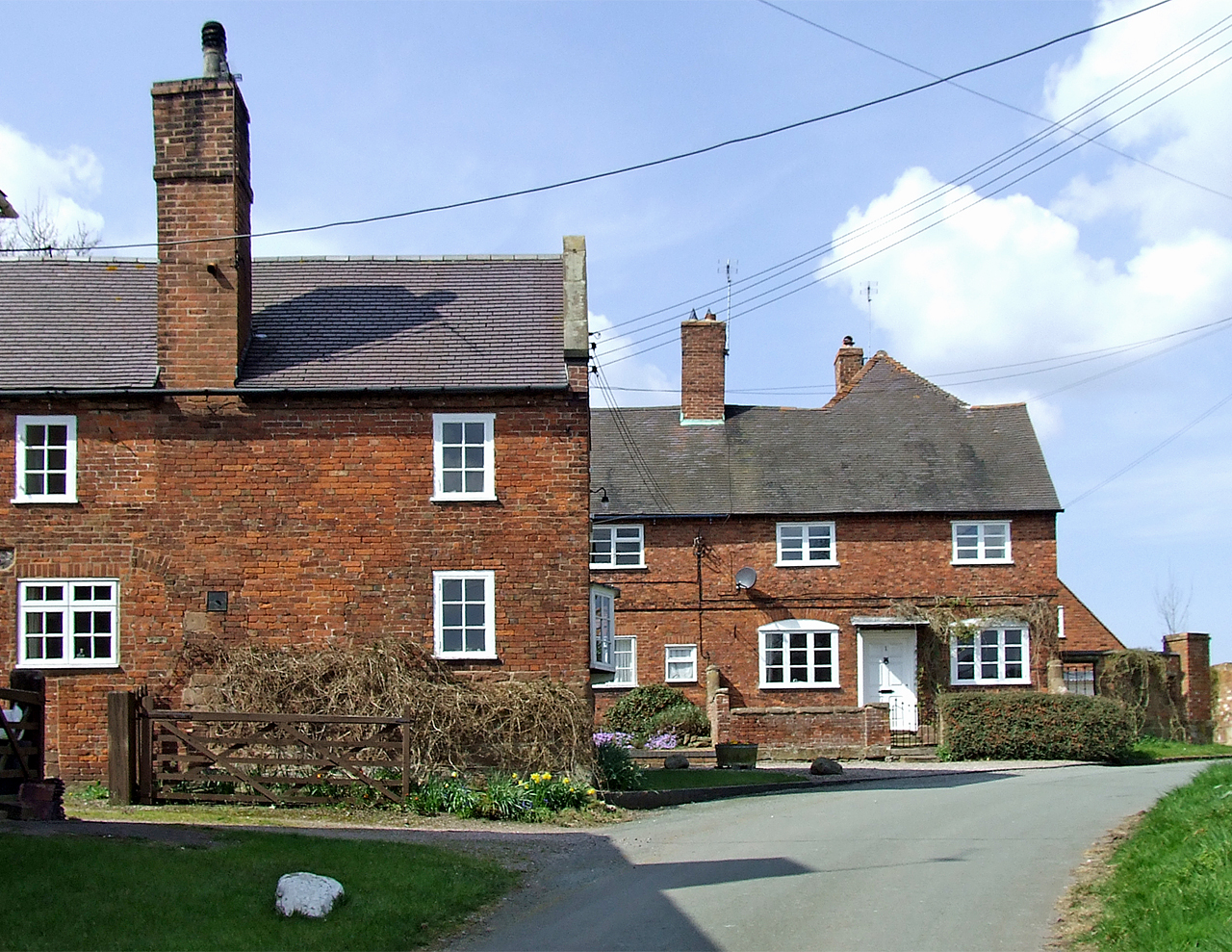

- Location within Shropshire
- Area: 6.247 km^{2} (2.412 sq mi)
- Population: 98 (2001 census)
  - Density: 16/km^{2} (41/sq mi)
- Civil parish: Rudge
- Unitary authority: Shropshire
- Ceremonial county: Shropshire
- Region: West Midlands
- Country: England
- Sovereign state: United Kingdom
- Police: West Mercia
- Fire: Shropshire
- Ambulance: West Midlands
- Website: https://www.worfieldparish.co.uk/

Rudge is a settlement and civil parish about 6 miles east of Bridgnorth, in the ceremonial county of Shropshire, England. In 2001 the parish had a population of 98. The parish touches those of Claverley and Worfield within Shropshire and Pattingham and Patshull and Trysull and Seisdon in Staffordshire. Rudge shares a parish council with Worfield.

== Landmarks ==
There are 4 listed buildings in Rudge. Rudge Hall, with a medieval core, was a seat of the Talbot and Wight-Boycott families. The estate was purchased in 1921 by William Wilson, a Wolverhampton brewer, and reconstructed with an elegant neo-Queen Anne facade in the 1930s to the designs of James A. Swann, in brick with stone dressings, sash windows and a loggia. An 18th-century cattle pound is nearby.

== History ==
The name "Rudge" means 'ridge'.

Rudge was recorded in the Domesday Book as Rigge. Rudge was formerly a township in the parish of Pattingham until in 1866 Rudge became a civil parish in its own right. On 1 April 1967 17 acres was transferred to Claverley parish.
