= Glazeley =

Hamlet in Shropshire, England

Coordinates: 52.491°N 2.438°W

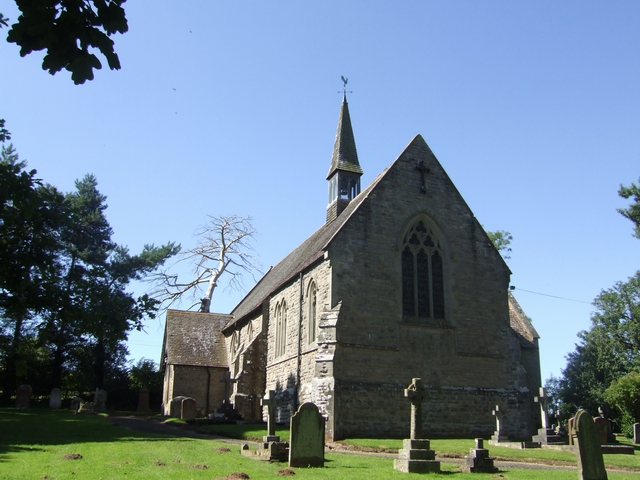
- St Bartholomew's Church

- Location within Shropshire
- OS grid reference: SO702882
- Civil parish: Glazeley
- Unitary authority: Shropshire
- Ceremonial county: Shropshire
- Region: West Midlands
- Country: England
- Sovereign state: United Kingdom
- Post town: BRIDGNORTH
- Postcode district: WV16
- Dialling code: 01746
- Police: West Mercia
- Fire: Shropshire
- Ambulance: West Midlands
- UK Parliament: Ludlow

Glazeley is a hamlet and civil parish in Shropshire, England.

It is situated on the B4363 road, southwest of Bridgnorth.

There is a parish church in the hamlet. The civil parish is small and borders the even smaller parish of Deuxhill. The Borle Brook flows to the northeast of the hamlet, and Glazeley Bridge takes the B-road over this small river. The smaller Crunells Brook forms the southern boundary of the parish.

== See also ==
- Listed buildings in Glazeley
