= Milson, Shropshire =

Village in Shropshire, England

Coordinates: 52.352°N 2.530°W

Milson
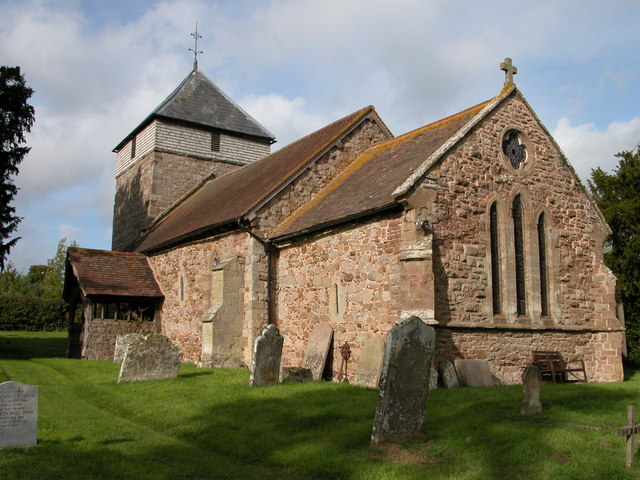
- Milson Church

- Location within Shropshire
- OS grid reference: SO639728
- Civil parish: Milson
- Unitary authority: Shropshire
- Ceremonial county: Shropshire
- Region: West Midlands
- Country: England
- Sovereign state: United Kingdom
- Post town: KIDDERMINSTER
- Postcode district: DY14
- Dialling code: 01299
- Police: West Mercia
- Fire: Shropshire
- Ambulance: West Midlands
- UK Parliament: Ludlow

Milson is a small village and civil parish in Shropshire, England. The Church of England parish church is dedicated to Saint George and is in the Diocese of Hereford.

During the 1970s a small popular airstrip for light aircraft, named MILSON, was created on a small farm within the parish. It is a popular destination during the summer months and is used occasionally by military helicopters from the Defence Helicopter Flying School (DHFS) at RAF Shawbury.

== See also ==
- Listed buildings in Milson, Shropshire
