= Easthope =

Village in Shropshire, England

Coordinates: 52.554°N 2.642°W

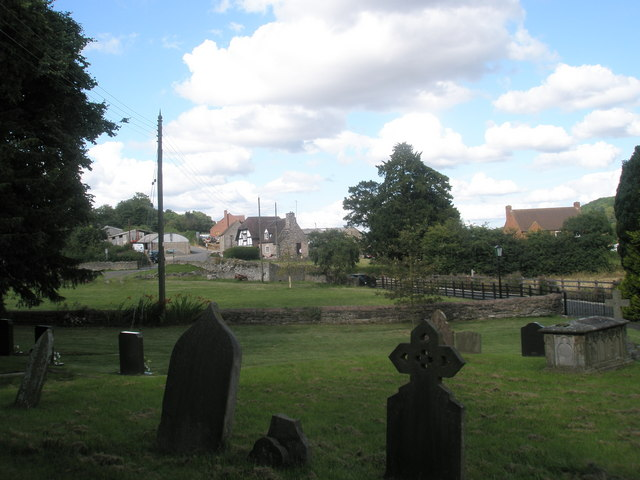
- Looking from St Peter, Easthope towards the village

- Location within Shropshire
- OS grid reference: SO564953
- Civil parish: Easthope
- Unitary authority: Shropshire
- Ceremonial county: Shropshire
- Region: West Midlands
- Country: England
- Sovereign state: United Kingdom
- Post town: MUCH WENLOCK
- Postcode district: TF13
- Dialling code: 01746
- Police: West Mercia
- Fire: Shropshire
- Ambulance: West Midlands
- UK Parliament: Ludlow

Easthope is a small village and small civil parish in Shropshire, England.

Wenlock Edge passes through the parish, to the northwest of the village, along which is Easthope Wood. A hamlet with the same name (or spelled Easthopewood) is on the other side of the Edge, within the parish.

Easthope gives its name to Easthope Road in the nearby town of Church Stretton, as a result of local property developer Ralph Beaumont Benson (1862–1911), who lived at Lutwyche Hall near the village. He was also responsible for the naming of Essex Road (after his wife, Caroline Essex Cholmondeley), Beaumont Road and Lutwyche Road, all in Church Stretton. He was the father of Stella Benson.

== See also ==
- Listed buildings in Easthope
