= Greete =

Coordinates: 52.333°N 2.625°W

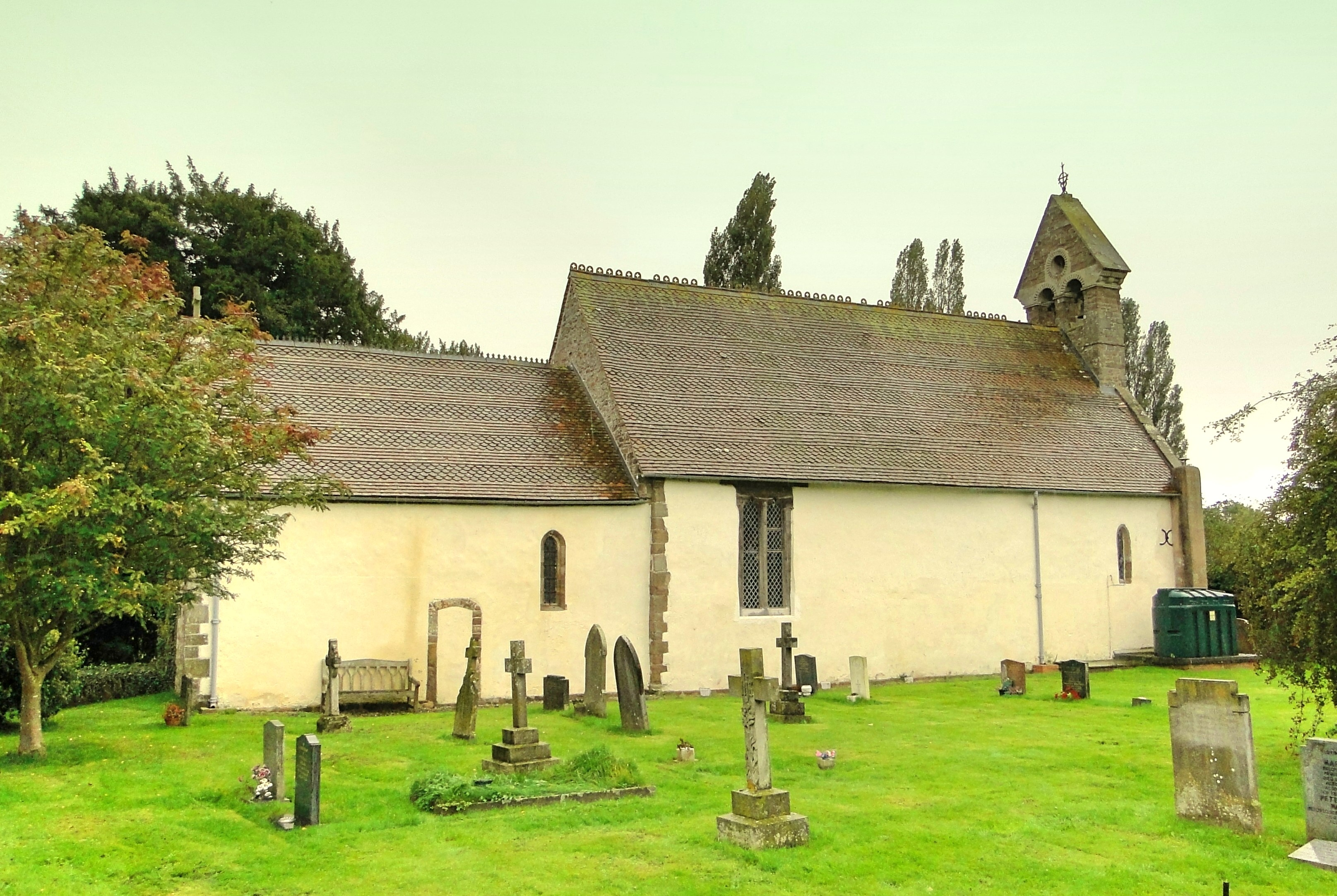
- St James' Church, Greete

- Location within Shropshire
- OS grid reference: SO574707
- Civil parish: Greete
- Unitary authority: Shropshire
- Ceremonial county: Shropshire
- Region: West Midlands
- Country: England
- Sovereign state: United Kingdom
- Post town: LUDLOW
- Postcode district: SY8
- Dialling code: 01584
- Police: West Mercia
- Fire: Shropshire
- Ambulance: West Midlands
- UK Parliament: Ludlow

Greete is a hamlet and civil parish in Shropshire, England.

It is situated between the villages of Caynham and Burford, about 5.2 miles (8.4 km) southeast of Ludlow. To the west flows Ledwyche Brook, which is the border with Herefordshire. The area is hilly and through the middle of the parish flows the Stoke Brook.

There is a church, dedicated to St James, which remains in use by the Church of England (Greete falling within the Diocese of Hereford). The church was built in the late 12th or early 13th century, expanded in 15th century and modernized in the 19th century. In 1856 the roof was rebuilt and so was the chancel arch and the south door.

== See also ==
- Listed buildings in Greete
