= Boningale =

Village and civil parish in Shropshire, England

Coordinates: 52.621°N 2.282°W

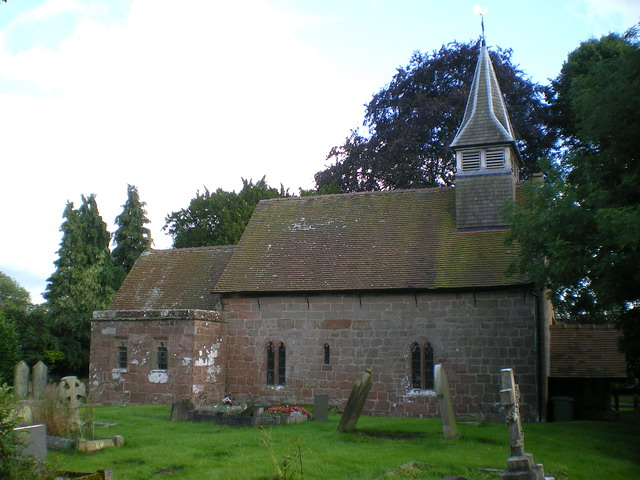
- St Chad's Church, Boningale

- Location within Shropshire
- Population: 302 (2011)
- OS grid reference: SJ809026
- Civil parish: Boningale
- Unitary authority: Shropshire
- Ceremonial county: Shropshire
- Region: West Midlands
- Country: England
- Sovereign state: United Kingdom
- Post town: WOLVERHAMPTON
- Postcode district: WV7
- Dialling code: 01902
- Police: West Mercia
- Fire: Shropshire
- Ambulance: West Midlands
- UK Parliament: The Wrekin

Boningale is a village and civil parish in Shropshire, England. The village lies just south of Albrighton, and just west of the county border with Staffordshire. The village is about eight miles west of Wolverhampton in the West Midlands, on the A464 road, and ten miles east of Telford.

According to the 2001 census, the parish had a population of 266, increasing to 302 at the 2011 census.

Its name was formerly spelt as Boningall or Bonninghall.

== Church ==
The red sandstone church of St. Chad was originally built in the 12th century, and now has a 19th-century interior. There are the remains of a medieval cross in the churchyard.

== Notable residents ==
Boningale's most famous resident is perhaps the notorious eighteenth-century criminal Jonathan Wild, who was said to have been born there in 1682, although he is otherwise described as a native of nearby Wolverhampton.

The mansion of Pepper Hill in the parish was the home of John Talbot (1545–1611) when it had a peripheral role in the aftermath of the Gunpowder Plot. After the plot's discovery, one of the fugitive conspirators Thomas Wintour, the brother of Talbot's son-in-law, Robert, sought assistance from Talbot who turned him away. Talbot was investigated but not charged with complicity while the Wintours were ultimately executed. The mansion, rebuilt in 1698, still stands.

== See also ==
- Listed buildings in Boningale
