= Stoke St. Milborough =

Civil parish in Shropshire, England

Coordinates: 52.436°N 2.637°W

- Stoke St. Milborough Parish Church

- Location within Shropshire
- Population: 409 (2011)
- OS grid reference: SO566823
- Civil parish: Stoke St. Milborough
- Unitary authority: Shropshire
- Ceremonial county: Shropshire
- Region: West Midlands
- Country: England
- Sovereign state: United Kingdom
- Post town: LUDLOW
- Postcode district: SY8
- Dialling code: 01584
- Police: West Mercia
- Fire: Shropshire
- Ambulance: West Midlands
- UK Parliament: Ludlow

Stoke St. Milborough is a parish located in the south of Shropshire, England, north-east of Ludlow. The population of the civil parish at the 2011 census was 409.

== History ==
Stoke and Stanton manors were settled by the compiling of the Domesday Book in 1086. There was a church at Stoke c. 1200, which seems to have incorporated vestiges of an earlier one. There was a mill at Stoke by 1334. Wool and woollen cloth seem to have been important products of the parish in the 14th century. In 1340, the parish's crops were devastated by storms, flocks dwindled and 11 tenants abandoned their holdings. In 1581, the lord of Stoke reserved to himself any mines on the waste and in 1637 he had mines of ironstone and limestone, which he was alleged to let to poor people at expensive rates. Limestone was being quarried in Stoke manor in 1637.

In 1815 there were 11 cottages on Stoke Gorse and 24 on Brown Clee. The population grew rapidly and in 1821, there were 554 inhabitants. The population remained steady until c. 1871, when it began to decline. In 1971, there were only 215 inhabitants. However, by 1991, it had risen again to 300.

== St. Milburga and St. Milburga's Well ==
St. Milburga's Well

St. Milburga was a Benedictine abbess who received the veil from St. Theodore of Canterbury. Her father was the King of Mercia and she was a sister of Saints Mildred of Thanet and Mildgytha. She was the abbess of Wenlock Abbey in Shropshire. She is supposed to have had remarkable abilities, such as levitation and power over birds. Her feast day is the 23rd of February.

According to legend, St. Milburga, after being chased by her enemies for two days, fell and hit her head on a stone. As there was no water that she could bathe the wound in, she commanded her horse to strike a rock, from which water suddenly gushed forth, thus creating the well. It is said that there was originally a stone near to the well that was stained with the saint's blood.

St. Milburga's (or St. Milburgha's) Well is a spring with an old stone basin, on the east side of Stoke village. It was first mentioned in 1321. It later became a clothes-washing place. Stories of its miraculous origin were recorded in the mid-19th century. The water was said to be good for sore eyes. It was covered and altered in 1873 and 1906 and by 1945 its water was piped to six houses.

== Famous people ==
- St. Milburga, Abbess of Wenlock
- Sir Thomas Littleton, 3rd Baronet (1647–1709), speaker of the House of Commons 1698–1700

== See also ==
- Listed buildings in Stoke St. Milborough
