= Aston Eyre =

Hamlet in Shropshire, England

Coordinates: 52.543°N 2.510°W

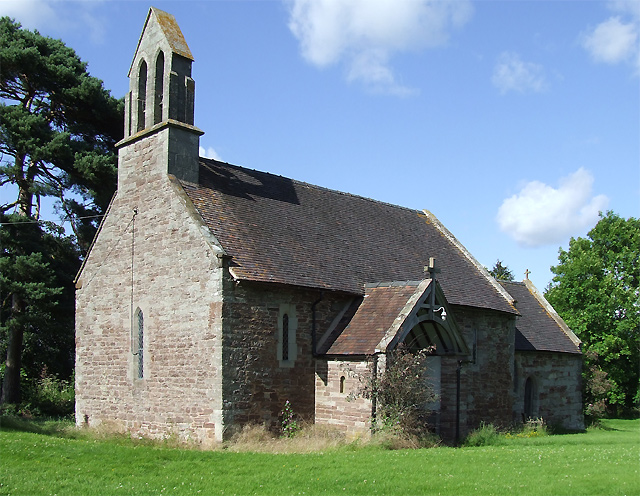
- Aston Eyre Church

- Location within Shropshire
- Population: 271 (2011 Census)
- OS grid reference: SO716927
- Civil parish: Aston Eyre
- Unitary authority: Shropshire
- Ceremonial county: Shropshire
- Region: West Midlands
- Country: England
- Sovereign state: United Kingdom
- Post town: BRIDGNORTH
- Postcode district: WV16
- Dialling code: 01746
- Police: West Mercia
- Fire: Shropshire
- Ambulance: West Midlands
- UK Parliament: Ludlow

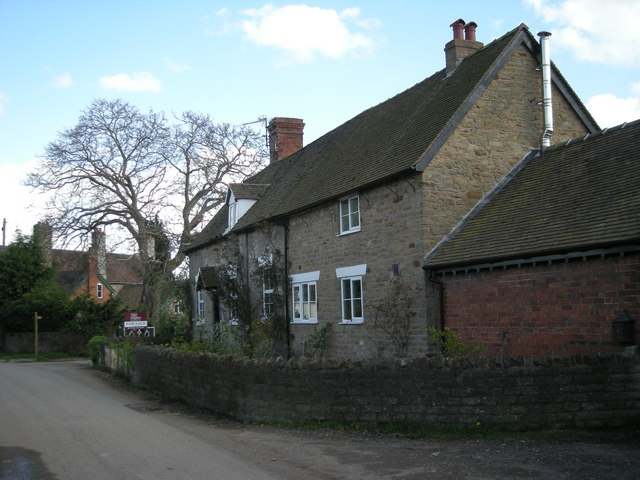
Housing in Aston Eyre

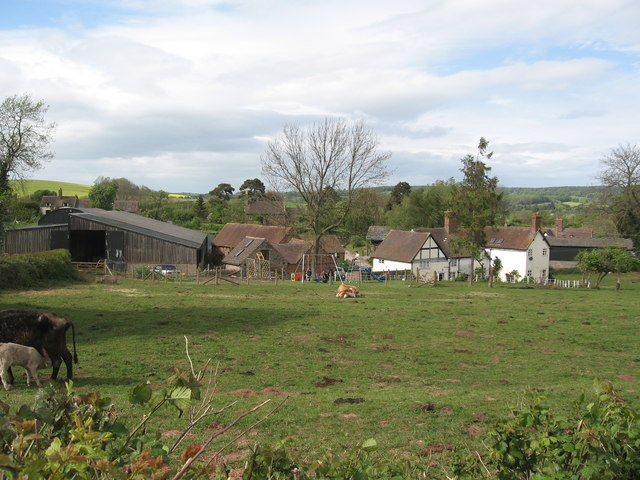
View across Aston Eyre, with the church in the distance.

Aston Eyre is a hamlet and civil parish in Shropshire, England, about four miles west of Bridgnorth. The area has a significant amount of green space. The spine road that runs through the centre of the village is the B4368.

== History ==
Aston Eyre was known as 'East farm/settlement'. It was held by Robert son of Aer (Fitz Aer) in 1212. Previously, the village was distinguished by the affix Wheaten, denoting a place where wheat was grown. In the years 1870-72 John Marius Wilson described Aston Eyre as "ASTON-EYRE, a township in Morvill parish, Salop; 4 miles W by N of Bridgeworth, Acres, 1,330. Pop., 85. Houses, 19. It forms a curacy annexed to the vicarage of Morvill".

In the early 1800s the population was divided into people working with agriculture, trade and manufacturing. After 1845 the inhabitants' occupations started to diversify. By 1881, the dominating 2 occupations were in agriculture and services. From that date onward the numbers in agriculture dropped and the numbers in services increased. By 2001, the numbers in services were 16 times the numbers in agriculture. The settlement has evolved with in accordance to the Industrial Revolution. Firstly heavy agriculture and then as that industry downsizes, services takes over.

== Demographics ==
The Population & Household Census data for 2011 shows that at the time Aston Eyre had a total population of 271. The population density has been at a constant level of less than one person per hectare since 1880-2000. The biggest population increase was from the years 1930-1960, over these years the percentage increase was 5% in an accumulating fashion. There were 11 full-time students in Aston Eyre of which two were economically active. In total 81 people were economically active, 35 of which were self-employed, and nine were part-time workers. 270 residents out of 271 total were of white/English ethnicity.

These demographics show that this parish is a typical English, rural settlement.

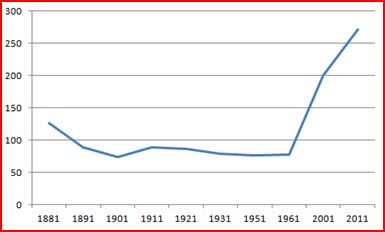
Population change (Aston Eyre)

== Places of interest ==
Aston Eyre Church has no religious dedication. It is described as a chapel of ease. The chapel was built in 1132 for the owners of the now ruined Aston Hall, which was later used for agricultural purposes in the 18th century. The church is located in the centre of the small hamlet.

Aston Eyre Hall was built in the mid-14th century and consists of two wings to the north and west, with a detached gatehouse to the east. The gatehouse has been converted into a functioning farm house and there is a similar barn to the north which dates to around 1613. The site was excavated by Channel 4's Time Team programme in 1997.

== See also ==
- Listed buildings in Aston Eyre
