= Listed buildings in Boningale =

Boningale is a civil parish in Shropshire, England. It contains 21 listed buildings that are recorded in the National Heritage List for England. More properties are 'curtilage listed' by virtue of their location on the grade II listed park and garden of Patshull. Of the formally listed properties, two are listed at Grade II*, the middle of the three grades, and the others are at Grade II, the lowest grade. The parish contains the village of Boningale, and is otherwise rural. The listed buildings include two former manor houses, other houses and associated structures, farmhouses and farm buildings, many of which date back to the 15th–17th centuries and which are basically timber framed. The other listed buildings include a church and items in the churchyard, and a telephone kiosk.

== Key ==
Grade	Criteria
II*	Particularly important buildings of more than special interest
II	Buildings of national importance and special interest

== Buildings ==
Name and location	Photograph	Date	Notes	Grade
St Chad's Church; 52.62085°N 2.27965°W		12th century	The church is in Norman style, the vestry was added in the 16th century, the south aisle in 1861, and the porch in 1894. It is built in sandstone, and has tiled roofs. The church consists of a nave, a south aisle, a south porch, a chancel with a north vestry. At the west end of the nave is a timber belfry with a broach spirelet and a copper weathercock.	II*
Former Churchyard cross 52.62076°N 2.27966°W	—	Medieval	The former cross is in sandstone, and has a roughly square socket stone with chamfered corners. What remains of the octagonal shaft appears to have been inverted to form the base for a sundial. The cross is also a Scheduled Monument.	II
Bishton Manor; 52.61319°N 2.29062°W	—	15th century	A manor house, later altered and extended, it is partly in stone and partly timber framed with plastered infill and rendered, and partly on a sandstone plinth. There are two storeys, and the original part consists of a three-bay open hall with wings. The rear of the service wing is jettied. The windows are casements, and there are canted bay windows.	II*
Lea Hall; 52.62394°N 2.28511°W	—	Late 16th or 17th century	A manor house, later a farmhouse, it has been altered and extended. The house is in red brick with tile roofs, two storeys and attics, and a front of four bays. The right bay projects and is gabled, and the left two bays have a lower roofline. The windows are mullioned and transomed, and the entrance is in the angle between the projecting bay and the main range.	II
Old Farmhouse and malthouse 52.62126°N 2.28199°W	—	16th or 17th century	The farmhouse is timber framed on a stone plinth, mainly rendered and with some brick, and with tiled roofs. The house has a T-shaped plan, two storeys, a range of probably four bays at right angles to the road, and a cross-wing to the east. The gable end facing the road has a jettied upper floor, and the windows are casements. To the rear is a former 17th-century malthouse, later incorporated into the house. It is timber framed on a sandstone plinth, it has two storeys and a cellar, and mullioned ground floor windows.	II
Church Farmhouse; 52.62078°N 2.28131°W		Early 17th century	A timber framed house with plastered infill on a plinth of brick and sandstone, with a tile roof. There are three storeys, both upper floors jettied, and a symmetrical front of three bays, the outer bays projecting and gabled. Some of the windows are mullioned, and the others are later casements.	II
Service wing, Bishton Manor; 52.61308°N 2.29093°W	—	Early to mid 17th century	The service wing is in sandstone on a chamfered plinth, and has a tiled roof. There are two storeys with an attic, and three bays, with a gable above the central bay. There are entrances with elliptical heads in the outer bays. The windows are mullioned, and some have been replaced by 20th-century casements. At the rear is an external flight of steps to a first floor doorway.	II
Barn, Lea Hall; 52.62409°N 2.28513°W	—	17th century (probable)	The barn is timber framed with brick infill on a brick plinth, and it has a corrugated iron roof. There are four bays, a wide entrance, and weatherboarding to the upper floor of the left gable end.	II
Old Cottage; 52.62156°N 2.28245°W		17th century	The cottage was later extended and altered. It is timber framed with brick infill on a sandstone plinth, and has a tiled roof. There is one storey and an attic, and three bays with a cross-passage. The windows are casements, there is one small window, and in the roof are two 20th-century gabled dormers.	II
Whiston Hall Farmhouse; 52.62476°N 2.30692°W	—	17th century	A farmhouse that was later altered and extended, it is mainly timber framed with some replacements in red brick. The infill is partly plastered and partly in red brick, and it has a plinth of brick and stone. The house has quoins, a tile roof, and two storeys. It consists of a main range of 2½ bays and a cross-wing of probably three bays. The windows are 20th-century casements, and the doorway is in the angle between the main range and the cross-wing.	II
Upper Pepperhill; 52.61473°N 2.26549°W	—	1698	The house was altered and extended in the 19th and 20th centuries. It is in red brick on a sandstone plinth, and has tiled roofs and massive chimney stacks. There are two storeys and four bays, the right bay a projecting gabled cross-wing. The windows are 20th-century casements in recessed openings with chamfered sills, and the doorway has a flat-headed arch.	II
Barn, Old Farmhouse; 52.62115°N 2.28209°W	—	17th or early 18th century	The barn is in sandstone on a chamfered plinth, and has exposed wall posts, a brick dentil eaves cornice, and a tile roof. There are three bays, three mullioned windows, a casement window, and three entrances.	II
Headstone to Anna Ward; 52.62065°N 2.27953°W	—	1767	The headstone is in the churchyard of St Chad's Church. It is in sandstone with a curved moulded head, and is carved with a winged angel and leaves, below which is an inscription.	II
Pier in garden, Patshull Hall; 52.60759°N 2.29598°W	—	Late 18th century (probable)	The pier is in the walled garden of the hall. It is in ashlar stone and has a square section, and is surmounted by a pineapple-shaped finial.	II
Wall, Patshull Hall; 52.60804°N 2.29722°W	—	Late 18th century (probable)	The wall encloses a garden to the northwest of the hall. It is in red brick with stone coping, and has a pineapple finial on the east side.	II
Chest tomb to Joseph Nock; 52.62069°N 2.27974°W	—	1791	The tomb is in the churchyard of St Chad's Church. It is in sandstone, and has a moulded plinth, recessed oval panels, six baluster shafts with fluted capitals, and a plain lid with a cornice.	II
Whiston Hall and carriage entrance 52.62216°N 2.30643°W	—	c. 1800	A country house in red brick and sandstone with a wooden cornice and a hipped slate roof. There are three storeys, a front of four bays, and a two-storey extension to the left. In the outer bays are bow windows, and the windows are sashes. In the right return is an Ionic porch. Attached to the northeast corner is a carriage entrance with a segmental arch and a pediment.	II
Two chest tombs 52.62067°N 2.27947°W	—	Late 18th or early 19th century	The chest tombs are in the churchyard of St Chad's Church. They are in sandstone, and have moulded tops, fluted corner pilasters and oval panels in the long sides. The inscriptions are only partly legible.	II
Little Whiston Farmhouse; 52.62116°N 2.30290°W	—	c. 1830–40	A stuccoed house with a moulded cornice and a hipped slate roof. It has an L-shaped plan, two storeys, and a garden front of three bays, chamfered at the ends and deeply recessed in the centre. The windows are sashes.	II
Farm buildings, Boningale Manor; 52.61981°N 2.25616°W	—	Mid 19th century	The farm buildings consist of a horse engine shed, a barn and stables. They are in brick with dentil eaves cornices and tiled roofs. The horse engine shed has a half-octagonal plan, and a conical roof with a finial. The barn has four bays with a loft, a blind round-headed arch, a wide entrance, now blocked, and air vents. In the stable is a blind arcade with inserted doors and windows, a wide entrance, and air vents.	II
Telephone kiosk, 52.62099°N 2.28125°W	—	1935	A K6 type telephone kiosk, designed by Giles Gilbert Scott. Constructed in cast iron with a square plan and a dome, it has three unperforated crowns in the top panels.	II
