= Listed buildings in Sutton Maddock =

Sutton Maddock is a civil parish in Shropshire, England. It contains six listed buildings that are recorded in the National Heritage List for England. Of these, one is listed at Grade II*, the middle of the three grades, and the others are at Grade II, the lowest grade. The parish contains the settlements of Sutton Maddock and Brockton, and is otherwise rural. The listed buildings consist of houses and a church.

== Key ==
Grade	Criteria
II*	Particularly important buildings of more than special interest
II	Buildings of national importance and special interest

== Buildings ==
Name and location	Photograph	Date	Notes	Grade
St Mary's Church; 52.60953°N 2.41650°W		1579	The oldest part of the church is the tower, the rest of the church was built in 1887–88 and designed by Thomas Nicholson. The church is built in sandstone with tile roofs, and consists of a nave, a south porch, a chancel with a north vestry and organ chamber, and a west tower. The tower has two stages, diagonal buttresses, a west window with a four-centred arch, an embattled parapet with corner pinnacles, and a pyramidal roof with a weathervane.	II*
5 and 7 Sutton Maddock; 52.61001°N 2.41077°W	—	Mid 17th century	A pair of cottages with two storeys, three bays, and a later extension on the left. The ground storey is in painted brick, the upper storey is timber framed with painted brick nogging, and the roof is tiled. The windows are casements.	II
Brockton Court; 52.62697°N 2.42025°W	—	1678	The house was extended in the 19th and 20th centuries. It is in brick with quoins and a hipped tile roof. There are two storeys, an attic and a cellar, a range of two bays, the former two-bay service wing to the rear, and a later bay added to the north. Most of the windows are sashes. At the entrance is a porch with Tuscan columns and a pediment, and to the right is a canted bay window.	II
Sutton Hall; 52.60992°N 2.41605°W		18th century	The house probably has a 17th-century core. It is in red brick with a hipped tile roof. There are two storeys, five bays, and a projecting wing with a hipped roof towards the left. The windows are sashes with plain lintels and keyblocks, and the doorway has a moulded surround with pilasters and a pediment.	II
Brockton House; 52.62638°N 2.41464°W	—	18th century	The house is in yellow brick with a moulded stuccoed cornice and a slate roof. There are two storeys and five bays. The centre bay is recessed and contains a doorway with Doric columns.	II
Brockton Hall Farm; 52.63001°N 2.41564°W	—	Early 19th century	The farmhouse is in red brick with a dentilled cornice and a slate roof. There are three storeys, and an L-shaped plan, with a symmetrical south front of three bays, the middle bay projecting under a pediment, and a long rear range. The windows are casements, those in the middle floor with brick segmental arches, and in the pediment is an elliptical window.	II
