= Listed buildings in Ruckley and Langley =

Ruckley and Langley is a civil parish in Shropshire, England. It contains four listed buildings that are recorded in the National Heritage List for England. Of these, one is listed at Grade I, the highest of the three grades, one is at Grade II*, the middle grade, and the others are at Grade II, the lowest grade. The parish is almost entirely rural, and the listed buildings consist of a chapel, the gatehouse of a former hall, a farmhouse, and a cottage.

== Key ==
Grade	Criteria
I	Buildings of exceptional interest, sometimes considered to be internationally important
II*	Particularly important buildings of more than special interest
II	Buildings of national importance and special interest

== Buildings ==
Name and location	Photograph	Date	Notes	Grade
Langley Chapel; 52.59666°N 2.68294°W		Early 14th century (possible)	Most of the chapel comes from later dates, it was re-roofed in 1691, and restored in 1900. The chapel is built in grey sandstone on a chamfered plinth, and has a sandstone slate roof. It consists of a nave and a chancel in one cell, and at the west end is a bellcote with weatherboarding and a pyramidal cap. In the centre of the south front is a chamfered round-arched window, and this is flanked by two Tudor arched doorways. In the north front is a double-chamfered mullioned flat-headed window, the east window has three pointed lights, and above it is a datestone.	I
Gatehouse northeast of Langley Hall Farmhouse; 52.59764°N 2.68064°W		14th century (probable)	The gatehouse is the only surviving part of Langley Hall, the rest of which has been demolished. It is mainly in grey sandstone with a stone-slate roof. There are two storeys and an attic, and three bays. The oldest part in the ground floor, which contains a double-chamfered archway. The upper storey was added in the 16th century, and is in sandstone on the outside, and timber framed on the front facing the former hall; this has infill in wattle and daub, lath and plaster, and red brick. The outer front has two coped gables with full dormers, and mullioned windows. The inner front has two gabled dormers with moulded bargeboards, one with a three-light mullioned window.	II*
Causeway Wood Farmhouse; 52.58353°N 2.70206°W	—	Mid to late 17th century (probable)	The farmhouse was partly rebuilt and extended in the 19th century. The early part is timber framed on a brick plinth with red brick infill, the rebuilding is in red brick and grey sandstone, the extension is in sandstone, and the roof is tiled. There is one storey and an attic, a front range of three bays, a single-storey lean-to extension on the right, and a rear wing. The windows are casements with segmental heads, and there are three full dormers.	II
Duffy's Cottage; 52.59584°N 2.69237°W	—	18th century (probable)	The cottage was later extended. It is in grey sandstone with dressings in red brick and a tile roof. There is one storey and an attic, and an L-shaped plan, consisting of a three-bay front range and a later rear wing. The windows are casements with segmental heads, and there is a gabled eaves dormer.	II
