= Listed buildings in Deuxhill =

Deuxhill s a civil parish in Shropshire, England. It contains three listed buildings that are recorded in the National Heritage List for England. Of these, one is at Grade II*, the middle of the three grades, and the others are at Grade II, the lowest grade. The parish contains the hamlet of Deuxhill and the surrounding countryside, and the listed buildings consist of the ruins of a church and two farmhouses.

== Key ==
Grade	Criteria
II*	Particularly important buildings of more than special interest
II	Buildings of national importance and special interest

== Buildings ==
Name and location	Photograph	Date	Notes	Grade
Church; 52.48247°N 2.44790°W	—	14th century (probable)	The church was abandoned after 1875, and is in ruins. What remains includes a portion of the north wall with a trefoil-headed window, and traces of the foundations.	II
Hall Farm House; 52.48078°N 2.44606°W		1601	The farmhouse is timber framed with a tile roof. There are two storeys with attics, and three gables on the front, the upper storey and gables being jettied. To the right is a cross-wing. The windows are a mix of casements and sashes.	II*
Church Farm House; 52.48209°N 2.44782°W	—	Late 18th century	The farmhouse is in brick with rusticated quoins and a hipped tile roof. There are two storeys and three bays, and a projecting two-bay wing on the left. The doorway has a wooden frame, a fanlight, and a pediment, and the windows are sashes with rusticated lintels.	II
