= Listed buildings in Ludford, Shropshire =

Ludford is a civil parish in Shropshire, England. It contains 24 listed buildings that are recorded in the National Heritage List for England. Of these, one is listed at Grade I, the highest of the three grades, four are at Grade II*, the middle grade, and the others are at Grade II, the lowest grade. The parish is to the south of the town of Ludlow, and contains the village of Ludford, and the surrounding countryside. The listed buildings include houses, cottages, farmhouses and farm buildings, a church, a mill and a weir, a bridge, a row of almshouses, a fives court, a hotel, and a bridge.

== Key ==
Grade	Criteria
I	Buildings of exceptional interest, sometimes considered to be internationally important
II*	Particularly important buildings of more than special interest
II	Buildings of national importance and special interest

== Buildings ==
Name and location	Photograph	Date	Notes	Grade
St Giles' Church; 52.36287°N 2.71683°W		11th century	The chancel dates from about 1300, and the large north chapel was added in about 1555. Alterations were made in 1870, and a porch was added in 1949. The church is built in stone, it has a tile roof, and consists of a nave, a chancel, a north chapel, a south porch, and a short west tower. The west window of the nave, which now looks into the tower, is Norman, and the windows in the south wall of the nave are Decorated.	II*
Charlton House, Garden House, Ludford House, and St Giles House; 52.36266°N 2.71752°W		Late medieval	The house was altered and extended at various times, and became a large house surrounding a rectangular courtyard; it has since been divided into four dwellings. The house is built in stone and brick with some timber framing, and has slate roofs, and two storeys. The windows vary, and include mullioned and transomed windows, casements, sashes, and bay windows. Other features include gables, some jettied, with decorative bargeboards, and an iron balcony over a porch with Ionic pilasters.	II*
Ludford Bridge; 52.36376°N 2.71723°W		15th century	The bridge, which was restored in 1886. carries the B4361 road over the River Teme. It is in stone, and consists of three arches with cutwaters that rise to form refuges. The bridge has a stone band on the east side and ashlar coping.	I
The Old Bell; 52.36338°N 2.71607°W		c. 1600	A timber framed house with plaster infill and a tile roof. There are two storeys and attics, a front of four bays, the right bay gabled, and a single-storey rear wing in stone and brick. The windows are mullioned and transomed and contain casements, and there is a dormer with a hipped roof. The porch has turned posts, balusters, and a moulded bressumer, and the doorway has a moulded surround, a fanlight, and a moulded lintel. The upper floor and attics are jettied, and in the right return is a massive stone chimney stack and a canted bay window.	II*
Steventon Manor; 52.35647°N 2.70472°W	—	Early 17th century	A stone house with a tile roof, it has two storeys, an attic and a cellar, and an E-shaped plan, with three gables at the front. In the centre is a porch with a semicircular arch. The windows are 20th-century casements, some of which are mullioned, or mullioned and transomed.	II
Bowling Green House; 52.36380°N 2.72777°W		17th century	At one time a public house, it has been extended and altered at various times. Originally timber framed with plaster infill, the extensions are in brick and stone, and the roof is tiled. There are two storeys and attics, and an irregular plan. The windows vary, and include casements, mullioned windows, a large bay window with a pentice roof, and an oriel window. On the gables are spike finials.	II
Foldgate Farmhouse; 52.36172°N 2.69789°W	—	17th century	The farmhouse is in brick with a tile roof, and has two storeys, an attic and a cellar, a front of three bays, and a rear wing. In the centre is a projecting porch, and the doorway has moulded jambs and lintel. The windows are mullioned or mullioned and transomed with hood moulds, and contain casements.	II
Barn, Foldgate Farm; 52.36163°N 2.69831°W	—	17th century	The barn was altered in the 19th century. It is partly timber framed with weatherboarding, and partly in brick and stone, and has a tile roof. There are four bays, and a 19th-century granary on the right.	II
Ludford Mill and weir 52.36355°N 2.71518°W		17th century	The mill is built in stone with some timber framing and brick, and has a tile roof. There are two storeys and an attic, and an L-shaped plan. Wooden steps lead to the upper floor, most windows are mullioned, and there are two hipped gable dormers. The weir is of medieval origin, and it has a horseshoe shape.	II
Barn south of Steventon Manor; 52.35602°N 2.70444°W	—	17th century	A house, later extended and converted into a barn, it is in stone and brick and has a tile roof. There are two storeys, and it contains doors, loft doors, and mullioned windows.	II
Barn east of Steventon Manor; 52.35645°N 2.70309°W	—	Late 17th century	A hay barn that was extended in the 18th century and later, it is partly timber framed with weatherboarding, and partly in brick and stone, and has a Welsh slate roof. There are nine bays.	II
St Giles' Hospital; 52.36322°N 2.71645°W		1672	A row of six almshouses in stone with a Welsh slate roof. They have one storey and attics, six bays, and three gables with coped parapets. In the ground floor are six-light mullioned windows, and in the attics are casement windows. The doors have chamfered surrounds and simple hoods.	II
Fives court 52.36429°N 2.72851°W	—	17th or 18th century	The court for fives or racquets is in stone with brick facing and rendered at the rear. There are wings, buttresses at the rear, stone coping, and urn finials.	II*
Barn, Whitcliffe Farm; 52.35941°N 2.72415°W	—	18th century	The barn is in stone with a conical roof of galvanised iron sheet, and it has a circular plan. The barn has a radius of about 4 metres (13 ft) and the walls are about 5 metres (16 ft) high. It contains four loading doors and ventilation slits, and there is a buttress.	II
Charlton Arms Hotel; 52.36348°N 2.71730°W		18th century	A house, later a hotel, it was refaced in the 19th century, and is in stone, partly roughcast, with a roof partly slated and partly tiled. There are two storeys and an attic, and an L-shaped plan with a front of three bays, the right bay wider and gabled. The recessed doorway in the middle bay has a porch with a chamfered stuccoed arch. Most of the windows are sashes, in the right bay is a canted bay window, and in the right return, overlooking the River Teme, is a semicircular oriel window.	II
Sheet House; 52.36362°N 2.68869°W	—	c. 1820	The house is stuccoed and has a hipped Welsh slate roof. There are two storeys, in the centre is a two-tier Tuscan porch flanked by bays, and there is a rear wing. The windows are sashes, and there are blind openings. The doorway has a moulded architrave surmounted by urns.	II
1, 2 and 3 Old Bell Cottages; 52.36314°N 2.71563°W	—	Early 19th century	A row of three cottages on earlier timber framing with tile roofs. They have two storeys, and each cottage has two bays, a porch, a doorway with a segmental head, and casement windows.	II
1 Whitcliffe Hill; 52.36323°N 2.71748°W		Early 19th century	A stone house with a slate roof, two storeys, two bays, and a rear extension. The windows are casements, those in the ground floor with segmental heads. To the right is a single-storey porch containing a doorway with a segmental head, above which is a band and machicolation.	II
Park Cottage; 52.36296°N 2.71544°W	—	Early 19th century	A roughcast house with a tile roof, two storeys and two bays. In the centre is a rustic porch, the doorway has a moulded surround, and the windows are casements.	II
Sheet Lodge; 52.36438°N 2.69014°W		Early 19th century	The former lodge to Sheet House, it is stuccoed, and has a Welsh slate roof with hipped splayed ends. There is a single storey, two bays, and a lean-to on the left. The central porch is recessed with two columns and is flanked by pilasters, and above the door is a fanlight. The windows are casements with ogee heads, and the returns are canted.	II
The Lodge, gates, railings and screen 52.36326°N 2.71672°W		Early 19th century	The lodge is at the entrance to St Giles' Church. It is in stone with a slate roof, and has a hexagonal plan. There is a single storey with an attic and a basement. The windows, some of which are casements, have chamfered lintels and hood moulds. In the gables, which have ornamental bargeboards, are lancet windows. To the right are wrought iron railings and gates with a screen above them.	II
Ledwyche Bridge; 52.36668°N 2.68424°W		Early to mid 19th century	The bridge carries Squirrel Lane over the Ledwyche Brook. It is in stone and brick, and consists of a single segmental arch. The bridge has a string course, keystones, coped parapets, end piers, and splayed approach roads.	II
2 and 3 Whitcliffe Hill and wall 52.36322°N 2.71766°W	—	Mid 19th century	Two houses, later combined into one, it is in stone, roughcast and with applied timber framing. There are two storeys and three bays. In the centre are double doors with pointed heads and simple hoods, and above is a mullioned window. The outer bays are gabled with decorative bargeboards. In the ground floor are mullioned and transomed windows, and the upper floor contains mullioned windows with pointed heads. To the right is a stone wall with two pediments, and a central doorway with a pointed head flanked by tall thin recesses with pointed heads.	II
Cliff Villas; 52.36329°N 2.71733°W		Mid 19th century	A pair of stone houses, roughcast with applied timber framing and a tile roof, in cottage orné style. There are two storeys, attics and cellars, and three bays. The central narrow bay has a recessed porch with pointed heads, and contains double doors, over which is a balcony with balusters, and windows with pointed heads. The outer bays are gabled with ornamental bargeboards. In the ground floor are mullioned windows with hood moulds, in the upper floor are canted oriel windows with moulded cornices, and in the gables are diamond-shaped windows.	II
