= Listed buildings in Glazeley =

Glazeley is a civil parish in Shropshire, England. The parish contains four listed buildings that are recorded in the National Heritage List for England. All the listed buildings are designated at Grade II, the lowest of the three grades, which is applied to "buildings of national importance and special interest". The parish contains the village of Glazeley and the surrounding countryside, and the listed buildings consist of a house, a milestone, a church, and a war memorial.

== Buildings ==
Name and location	Photograph	Date	Notes
Milestone; 52.48907°N 2.44329°W	—	Early 19th century (probable)	The milestone is on the west side of the B4363 road. It consists of a stone with a rounded top, and a cast iron plate inscribed with the distances in miles to Bridgnorth and to Cleobury Mortimer.
Woodlands; 52.49634°N 2.42740°W	—	Early 19th century	A stone house with a hipped slate roof, two storeys and four bays. It has a flat roofed porch, and the windows are sashes with pointed heads and Gothic glazing.
St Bartholomew's Church; 52.49130°N 2.43851°W		1873–75	The church, designed by A. W. Blomfield in Decorated style, is built in grey sandstone with freestone dressings and a tile roof. It consists of a nave, a south porch, and a chancel with a north vestry and organ chamber. Above the east end of the nave is a flèche with a weathervane.
War memorial 52.49187°N 2.43848°W		c. 1920	The war memorial is in a corner of the churchyard of St Bartholomew's Church. It is in stone, and consists of a square tapering pier on an octagonal plinth on a three-stepped platform. Surmounting the pier is a ball finial on a cube. Words are inscribed on the sides of the cube, and on the plinth is another inscription and the names of those lost in the First World War.
