= Listed buildings in Uffington, Shropshire =

Uffington is a civil parish in Shropshire, England. In the parish are 13 listed buildings that are recorded in the National Heritage List for England. Of these, one is listed at Grade I, the highest of the three grades, and the others are at Grade II, the lowest grade. The parish contains the village of Uffington, and is otherwise mainly rural. In the parish are the remains of Haughmond Abbey, which is listed at Grade I, and is also a Scheduled Monument. Also in the parish was Sundorne Castle, a country house that has been demolished. A number of structures associated with the house have survived, and are listed. The other listed buildings include houses, cottages, farmhouses and farm buildings, the earliest of which are timber framed, a pump in an enclosure, and a church.

== Key ==
Grade	Criteria
I	Buildings of exceptional interest, sometimes considered to be internationally important
II	Buildings of national importance and special interest

== Buildings ==
Name and location	Photograph	Date	Notes	Grade
Haughmond Abbey; 52.73202°N 2.68019°W		12th century	A former Augustinian abbey, it was extended in the 13th and 14th centuries. Following the Dissolution of the Monasteries part of it was converted into a mansion, and after the Civil War it became a farm. Only ruins remain, the most substantial parts being parts of the infirmary and the abbot's lodging, the latter with a large three-sided bay window. Only the foundation stones of the church have survived. Other remains include part of the cloister walls, three arches from the chapter house, and three chimneys from the kitchen. The remains are also a Scheduled Monument.	I
Vine Cottage; 52.71891°N 2.69875°W	—	Late 17th century	A timber framed house with rendered infill on a rendered plinth and with a tile roof. There is one storey and an attic, originally with a hall and a gabled cross-wing, and the angle later filled in. The windows are casements.	II
Barn, Haughmond Farm; 52.73380°N 2.67529°W	—	Late 17th century	The barn is timber framed with brick nogging, partly replaced in brick, and with a tile roof. There are three bays, and the barn contains a ground floor opening flanked by two stable doors and a loft door above.	II
The Malthouse; 52.72010°N 2.69943°W	—	Late 17th century	The former malthouse, later altered and divided for residential use, is timber framed with painted brick infill, some brick work, and has a tile roof. The main part has three storeys, four bays, and two doorways, one with a flat-roofed porch, and the other with a gabled hood. To the left, towards the road, is an extension with two storeys and an attic.	II
The Old Post Office, Smithy and 1 and 2 Uffington; 52.72174°N 2.69903°W		Late 18th century	A row of buildings in red brick with tile roofs. In the centre is a house with two storeys and two bays, a central doorway with a semicircular fanlight, and casement windows with segmental heads. To the left is a former smithy, with a single storey, a roof hipped at the left end, segmental-headed openings, and a dormer. To the right is a pair of cottages with one storey and attics, casement windows and four dormers.	II
Pump and enclosure 52.72077°N 2.69969°W		Early 19th century	The pump is in cast iron and has a fluted head, it is moulded at the top and the bottom, and has a long double-curved handle. The pump stands in an enclosure surrounded by low stone walls with pitched coping, and in the front is a large opening.	II
Sunderton Farmhouse; 52.74338°N 2.69608°W	—	Early 19th century	A red brick farmhouse with a tile roof. There are two storeys and an L-shaped plan, with a front of three bays. The central doorway has a fanlight and an open pediment, and the windows are casements with segmental heads.	II
Chapel, Sundorne Castle; 52.73252°N 2.70124°W	—	Early 19th century	The chapel, which possibly incorporates earlier material, is in red brick and sandstone, and has a tile roof with verge parapets. The north front has a small gabled porch with a round-headed entrance, and is otherwise blank. The south front has a moulded plinth and three bays divided by gableted buttresses that rise to crocketed pinnacles, and with an embattled parapet between them. The windows have pointed arches and are in Decorated style.	II
Farm buildings and carriage arch, Sundorne Castle; 52.73267°N 2.70099°W	—	Early 19th century	The buildings are in red brick with a tile roof and verge parapets. There is one storey and attics, and an L-shaped plan. In the centre of the east face is an elliptical-arched carriage entrance. Above it is a gable with an elliptical pitching hole in the tympanum, and it is flanked by a pair of dormers. The windows are casements with segmental heads.	II
Gatehouse, Sundorne Castle; 52.73271°N 2.69991°W		Early 19th century	The gatehouse is in red brick with embattled parapets and taller octagonal corner turrets. It has two storeys, a square plan, and a Tudor arched carriageway. In the upper floor is a Tudor-arched three light mullioned window, and in the turrets are slit windows.	II
Screen wall and tower, Sundorne Castle; 52.73258°N 2.70070°W		Early 19th century	The wall and tower are in red brick. The wall connects the chapel and the gatehouse, it is about 4 metres (13 ft) high, and has eight bays and three buttresses, and is partly embattled. The tower has a square plan, two storeys, and a higher stair turret to the northwest; both are embattled. On the south side is a range of three Tudor arched windows.	II
Wall, gateway and shelter, Sundorne Castle; 52.73416°N 2.70210°W	—	Early 19th century	The perimeter wall is in red brick with some stone coping and forms an F-shaped plan, the main north–south spine being about 150 metres (490 ft) long. It is embattled, and contains buttresses. At the south end is a gateway with a Tudor arched carriage entrance containing cast iron gates, and a smaller pedestrian entrance. At the north end is a gabled shelter containing an entry with a pointed arch.	II
Holy Trinity Church; 52.72059°N 2.70018°W		1855–56	The church, designed by S. Pountney Smith, is built in Grinshill sandstone and has tile roofs. It consists of a nave and chancel in one cell, a narrow north aisle, and a timber framed south porch. On the apex of the west gable is a bellcote, at the east end is a wheel window, and the other windows are lancets with hood moulds.	II
