= Deuxhill =

Hamlet in Shropshire, England

Coordinates: 52.481°N 2.447°W

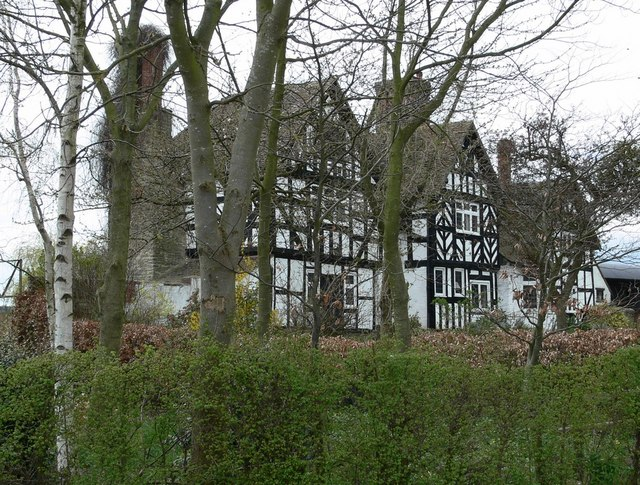
- Farmhouse in Deuxhill, Shropshire

- Location within Shropshire
- OS grid reference: SO696871
- Civil parish: Deuxhill
- Unitary authority: Shropshire
- Ceremonial county: Shropshire
- Region: West Midlands
- Country: England
- Sovereign state: United Kingdom
- Post town: BRIDGNORTH
- Postcode district: WV16
- Dialling code: 01746
- Police: West Mercia
- Fire: Shropshire
- Ambulance: West Midlands
- UK Parliament: Ludlow

Deuxhill (/ˈdjuːkshɪl/ DYOOKS-hill) is a hamlet and very small civil parish in Shropshire, England.

The nearest town is Bridgnorth. The hamlet is situated on the B4363 road, north of Billingsley. Between the two parishes flows the Horsford Brook. To the north and east is the small parish of Glazeley.

According to the 2001 census it had a population of 20. It is the smallest parish in Shropshire by area – the smallest by population is Boscobel.

Despite the small population, there is a village hall.

== See also ==
- Listed buildings in Deuxhill
