= Listed buildings in Milson, Shropshire =

Milson is a civil parish in Shropshire, England. It contains six listed buildings that are recorded in the National Heritage List for England. Of these, one is at Grade II*, the middle of the three grades, and the others are at Grade II, the lowest grade. The parish contains the village of Milson and the surrounding countryside. The oldest listed building is the church. The other listed buildings are farmhouses, a house and a cottage, all of which are timber framed, and all of which date from before the middle of the 17th century.

== Key ==
Grade	Criteria
II*	Particularly important buildings of more than special interest
II	Buildings of national importance and special interest

== Buildings ==
Name and location	Photograph	Date	Notes	Grade
St George's Church; 52.35225°N 2.53051°W		12th century	The tower dates from the 13th century, the porch probably from the 14th century, the roof was added to the tower possibly in 1723, and the church was restored in 1865. It is built in stone with tile roofs, and is in Norman style. The church consists of a nave, a short lower chancel, a south porch, and a west tower. The tower is squat, the top stage is shingled, and it has a pyramidal slate roof.	II*
Church House Farmhouse; 52.35170°N 2.53057°W	—	Late 16th century	The farmhouse, later a private house, was altered in the 19th century and extensively restored in about 1980. It is timber framed with plaster infill, the extensions are in brick, and it has tiled roofs. It originally had an H-shaped plan with a two-bay hall range and two two-bay cross-wings, an extension has been added to the side of the east cross-wing, and there are lean-to extensions at the rear. The house has two storeys, attics and cellars, and the windows are mullioned.	II
Leafields Farmhouse; 52.35185°N 2.52243°W	—	Late 16th to early 17th century	The farmhouse is timber framed with brick infill, partly rendered, with some weatherboarding, some applied timber framing, and a tile roof. There are two storeys, a main range of four bays, and a one-bay rear wing. The windows are casements, and there is a gabled porch.	II
Orchard House; 52.35448°N 2.53092°W	—	Late 16th to early 17th century	A wing was added to the house in the 20th century. The original part is timber framed with brick infill, partly rendered, the extension is in brick, and the roof is shingled. Originally the house consisted of a main range and a two-bay cross-wing, and the extension added another cross-wing, giving an H-shaped plan.. There are two storeys and attics, both storeys of the gable end are jettied, the windows are casements, and there are two gabled dormers.	II
Lower Langley Farmhouse; 52.35527°N 2.51022°W		Early 17th century	The farmhouse, which was later altered and extended, is timber framed with brick infill, the extensions are in brick, and the roof is tiled. It has two storeys and an attic, a two-bay main range, parallel rear extensions and a single-storey extension at the right end. There is a 19th-century canted bay window, and the other windows are casements.	II
Rose Cottage; 52.35573°N 2.53153°W	—	Early 17th century	The cottage was extended in the 19th century and altered in the 20th century. It is timber framed with brick infill, partly rendered, and has a tile roof. There is one storey and an attic, and a single-storey extension to the right. The windows are casements, and there is a gabled porch.	II
