= Listed buildings in Rudge, Shropshire =

Rudge is a civil parish in Shropshire, England. It contains four listed buildings that are recorded in the National Heritage List for England. Of these, one is listed at Grade II*, the middle of the three grades, and the others are at Grade II, the lowest grade. The parish is almost entirely rural, and the listed buildings consist of two houses, outbuildings, and an animal pound.

== Key ==
Grade	Criteria
II*	Particularly important buildings of more than special interest
II	Buildings of national importance and special interest

== Buildings ==
Name and location	Photograph	Date	Notes	Grade
Outbuildings north of Rudge Hall; 52.57752°N 2.27659°W	—	17th century	The outbuildings are in stone and have a tile roof with coped gables. They have two storeys, and contain four stone mullioned windows on the front, and two doorways with cambered heads.	II*
Old Pound; 52.57528°N 2.28000°W		18th century (probable)	The animal pound is at a road junction and is in stone. It consists of a circular enclosure with walls about 6 feet (1.8 m) high.	II
7 Rudge; 52.57368°N 2.27978°W	—	Late 18th century	A brick house on a stone plinth, it has a tile roof. There are two storeys, and two bays. The doorway is flanked by columns, and it has a pediment, and the windows are casements.	II
Rudge Hall; 52.57721°N 2.27642°W	—	1931–33	The core is medieval and the present state of the house is due to considerable rebuilding in Baroque style. It is in red brick with stone dressings and a hipped tile roofs. There are two storeys and five bays. The windows are sashes flanked by pilasters with Corinthian caps. On the south front is a three-arched loggia.	II
