= Listed buildings in Preston upon the Weald Moors =

Preston upon the Weald Moors is a civil parish in the district of Telford and Wrekin, Shropshire, England. It contains six listed buildings that are recorded in the National Heritage List for England. Of these, one is listed at Grade I, the highest of the three grades, one is at Grade II*, the middle grade, and the others are at Grade II, the lowest grade. The parish contains the village of Preston upon the Weald Moors and the surrounding countryside. Five of the listed buildings are in the village, and consist of a group of almshouses and its associated lodges, two farmhouses and a church, and to the southeast of the village is a timber framed house.

== Key ==
Grade	Criteria
I	Buildings of exceptional interest, sometimes considered to be internationally important
II*	Particularly important buildings of more than special interest
II	Buildings of national importance and special interest

== Buildings ==
Name and location	Photograph	Date	Notes	Grade
Hoo Hall; 52.73006°N 2.46835°W	—	c. 1600	A timber framed house with brick infill, mostly encased in brick, and with a tile roof. There are two storeys and an L-shaped plan, consisting of a hall and a cross-wing. The windows are casements, and inside is elaborate plasterwork.	II*
Preston Hospital, screen and gates 52.73468°N 2.47687°W		1721–75	A group of almshouses in Georgian style, built in red brick with dressings in Grinshill sandstone and with hipped tile roofs. They have two storeys and a U-shaped plan, with three ranges around a courtyard, the main range with seven bays, and the flanking ranges each with twelve bays. The middle three bays of the main range form the hall, which has four giant Doric pilasters, a central doorway with a round-arched Gibbs surround and a pediment. In the outer bays are large arched windows with Gibbs surrounds, and above is an entablature with a balustrade and a stone clock tower. The flanking bays and ranges contain sash windows in moulded architraves. Other features include rusticated elliptical arcades, quadrant wings at the ends of the ranges, and ornate wrought iron gates and a screen with an overthrow flanked by cast iron railings.	I
St Lawrence's Church; 52.73519°N 2.47405°W		1739	The chancel was added in 1853. The church is built in red brick with stone dressings, a moulded eaves cornice, and a tile roof. It consists of a nave, a chancel and a west tower. The tower has three stages, round-arched openings, corner pilasters, string courses, clock faces, and a parapet. The nave windows have round heads, keyblocks, imposts, and moulded cills, and the windows in the chancel are lancets.	II
Preston Hall; 52.73570°N 2.47474°W	—	18th century	A red brick farmhouse with a dentilled eaves cornice, string courses, and a tile roof with parapeted gable ends. There are two storeys and an attic, three bays, and a later single-storey extension on the right. The windows are mullioned and transomed casements with kayblocks, and the central doorway has a gabled hood.	II
Village Farmhouse; 52.73630°N 2.47373°W	—	18th century	A red brick house with a dentilled eaves cornice and a tile roof. There are two storeys and two bays. The windows are mullioned and transomed casements with segmental heads, and in the centre is a doorway with pilasters and an entablature.	II
Lodges, Preston Hospital; 52.73389°N 2.47606°W		1831	The lodges flank the gateway to the hospital. They are in red brick on stone plinths, with giant Tuscan pilasters, entablatures and hipped slate roofs. Each lodge has one storey, one bay facing the road, and two facing the drive, the latter containing a round-arched doorway with a fanlight, and a moulded stone architrave with a keyblock and imposts. The windows are sashes with moulded stone architraves and keyblocks.	II
