= Listed buildings in Aston Botterell =

Aston Botterell is a civil parish in Shropshire, England. It contains three listed buildings that are recorded in the National Heritage List for England. Of these, two are listed at Grade II*, the middle of the three grades, and the other is at Grade II, the lowest grade. The parish contains the small village of Aston Botterell and is otherwise completely rural. The listed buildings consist of a church and two houses.

== Key ==
Grade	Criteria
II*	Particularly important buildings of more than special interest
II	Buildings of national importance and special interest

== Buildings ==
Name and location	Photograph	Date	Notes	Grade
St Michael's Church; 52.45375°N 2.54220°W		12th century	The aisle dates from the 13th century, the porch was dated 1639, and the tower was rebuilt in 1883–84. The church consists of a nave and chancel in one cell, a south aisle, a south porch and a west tower. The tower has three stages and an embattled parapet. In the chancel is a Norman window, and a priest's door dating from the 13th century.	II*
Manor House; 52.45408°N 2.54273°W	—	13th century	The house was refashioned in 1576 and later. It is built partly in stone and partly in brick and has tiled roofs. The windows date from the 18th century and later. Inside there is good plasterwork.	II*
The Bold; 52.46032°N 2.52902°W	—	Early 14th century	A farmhouse that incorporates an early two-bay hall. The house has since been refashioned and extended up to the 19th century. It is partly timber framed, partly in stone, and partly in brick, and has tiled roofs. There are two storeys, and the windows are a mix of sashes and casements.	II
