= Listed buildings in Tasley =

Tasley is a civil parish in Shropshire, England. It contains three listed buildings that are recorded in the National Heritage List for England. All the listed buildings are designated at Grade II, the lowest of the three grades, which is applied to "buildings of national importance and special interest". The parish, which is to the west of Bridgnorth, contains the small village of Tasley, some suburban housing on the edge of Bridgnorth, and is otherwise rural farmland and isolated farms. The listed buildings are a church, a house, and a former farmhouse converted into cottages.

== Buildings ==
Name and location	Photograph	Date	Notes
Former farmhouse at The Leasowes; 52.53484°N 2.44881°W	—	17th century (probable)	The farmhouse, later divided into two cottages, is timber framed with a tile roof. There are two storeys and an attic, three bays, and an added bay to the right with applied timber framing. The windows are casements.
The Leasowes; 52.53533°N 2.44940°W	—	Early 19th century	A brick house with a hipped slate roof, two storeys, and three bays. The porch has Tuscan pillars, a stuccoed cornice, and elaborate voluted parapets. The windows are sashes with moulded lintels.
Church of St Peter and St Paul; 52.54431°N 2.44869°W		1840–41	The church is built in yellow brick with a slate roof, and is in Gothic style. It consists of a four-bay nave, and a single-bay chancel. At the west end is a gabled bellcote with two bells and a pierced roundel. The doorway is at the west end and has a pointed arch, and the windows are lancets. Inside are some fittings from an earlier church on the site.
