= Listed buildings in Burwarton =

Burwarton is a civil parish in Shropshire, England. The parish contains three listed buildings that are recorded in the National Heritage List for England. All the listed buildings are designated at Grade II, the lowest of the three grades, which is applied to "buildings of national importance and special interest". The listed buildings consist of two churches, both redundant, and one in ruins, and a public house.

== Buildings ==
Name and location	Photograph	Date	Notes
Old Church of St Laurence; 52.46127°N 2.56362°W		12th century	The remains of the church are ruins, and what remains include the east gables of the nave and the chancel, and the Norman chancel arch.
The Boyne Arms Inn; 52.46261°N 2.56407°W		c. 1840	The public house is in stone and has a hipped slate roof. There are two storeys and four bays, the left bay projecting forward and gabled. On the front is a porch with Doric columns and pilasters and a doorway with a semicircular fanlight. The windows are sashes with bracketed hood moulds.
Former Church of St Laurence; 52.46072°N 2.56417°W		1874–76	The church was designed by Anthony Salvin in Decorated style, but became redundant in 1972, and has been converted into a house. It is in sandstone, the north aisle has a lead roof, and the rest of the roof is tiled. The church consists of a nave with a clerestory, north and south aisles, a south porch, a chancel with a north organ chamber and vestry, and a west tower. The tower has four stages, angle buttresses, a west doorway, a cornice and an embattled parapet containing a coat of arms.
