= Listed buildings in Kemberton =

Kemberton is a civil parish in Shropshire, England. It contains nine listed buildings that are recorded in the National Heritage List for England. All the listed buildings are designated at Grade II, the lowest of the three grades, which is applied to "buildings of national importance and special interest". The parish includes the village of Kemberton and the surrounding countryside. All the listed buildings are in or near the centre of the village, and consist of a church and memorials in the churchyard, houses, farmhouses and farm buildings.

== Buildings ==
Name and location	Photograph	Date	Notes
Kemberton Hall Farmhouse; 52.63529°N 2.39581°W	—	17th century (probable)	The farmhouse is timber framed and mainly pebbledashed, and has a tile roof. There is one storey and attics, and a T-shaped plan, consisting of a main range of nine bays, and a short gabled rear wing with a dentil eaves cornice. The doorway has a plain hood, there are three casement windows, one sash window, and four raking half-dormers. The left gable is crow-stepped.
Barn and cowhouse, Kemberton House; 52.63905°N 2.39987°W	—	17th century	The barn is timber framed with red brick infill, there is some rebuilding in red brick, and it has a tile roof. There are five bays, and a doorway and air vents on the north side. The cowhouse to the north is in sandstone and has a tile roof and two bays. At right angles to it at the southwest is a 19th-century red brick stable, and at the southeast end of the barn is a 17th-century timber-framed barn with crow-stepped gables, which has been converted for domestic use.
The Cedars; 52.63868°N 2.40057°W	—	1722	A red brick house in Georgian style on a stone plinth, with bands, a moulded eaves cornice, and a tile roof. There are three storeys, and three bays. The central doorway has a Tuscan porch and a radial fanlight, and the windows are sashes.
Kemberton House; 52.63893°N 2.40025°W	—	Early to mid 18th century	A red brick house in Georgian style on a sandstone plinth, with a coved plastered cornice and a tile roof. There are two storeys, an attic and a cellar, and five bays. The central doorway is round-headed, it has a recessed porch with side benches, and a radial fanlight. The windows are side-hung casements with segmental heads.
5 Hall Lane; 52.63740°N 2.40348°W	—	1734	A brick cottage with a band, dentil eaves, and a tile roof. There is one storey and an attic, and two bays. The windows are casements, there are two gabled eaves dormers, and at the rear is some exposed timber framing.
Cherrington memorial 52.63779°N 2.40195°W	—	1817	The memorial is in the churchyard of St Andrew's Church, and is to the memory of John Cherrington. It is a cylindrical tomb in sandstone, and has a moulded base and capping and a broken finial.
Ward memorial and enclosure 52.63780°N 2.40193°W	—	Early 19th century	The memorial is in the churchyard of St Andrew's Church, and is to the memory of John Ward and his wife, Sarah. It is a chest tomb in sandstone, and has semicircular inscription panels on the long sides with fluted spandrels, and reeded pilasters and capping. It is surrounded by a wrought iron enclosure.
Pyramidal monument 52.63800°N 2.40200°W	—	c. 1830	The monument is in the corner of the churchyard of St Andrew's Church. It is in sandstone, and has a panelled plinth, incised sloping sides, and a low pyramidal cap. Its inscription is illegible.
St Andrew's Church; 52.63779°N 2.40167°W		1881–82	The church is built on the site of a medieval church. The porch and vestry were added in 1889 and the tower in 1908. The church is built in Cosford sandstone, the roofs are tiled, and it is in Decorated style. The church consists of a nave, a south porch, a chancel, a north vestry, and a west tower. The tower has three stages, diagonal buttresses, an external stair turret on the north side, a clock face on the south side, and an embattled parapet with eight crocketed pinnacles.
