= Listed buildings in Easthope =

Easthope is a civil parish in Shropshire, England. It contains five listed buildings that are recorded in the National Heritage List for England. Of these, one is at Grade II*, the middle of the three grades, and the others are at Grade II, the lowest grade. The parish contains the village of Easthope and the surrounding countryside. All the listed buildings are in the village, and consist of a church, three houses, and a malthouse.

== Key ==
| Grade | Criteria |
|---|---|
| II* | Particularly important buildings of more than special interest |
| II | Buildings of national importance and special interest |

== Buildings ==
| Name and location | Photograph | Date | Notes | Grade |
|---|---|---|---|---|
| St Peter's Church; 52.55222°N 2.64139°W | | 14th century | The church was badly damaged by fire in 1928 and restored, the earliest surviving original feature being a window in the chancel. The church is built in siltstone with freestone dressings and a stone-tile roof. It consists of a nave and chancel in one cell, a south porch and a north vestry, and at the west end is a timber framed belfry. | II |
| Crowther's House; 52.55309°N 2.64042°W | — | 16th century | The house is partly timber framed with some cruck construction, and partly in brick. It has one storey and an attic, and the roof is tiled. | II |
| Manor Farm House; 52.55313°N 2.64104°W | — | Late 16th century (probable) | The farmhouse is in timber framing and brick, and has a tiled roof. There are two storeys, a hall and a cross-wing, and the windows are casements. | II |
| Rectory; 52.55410°N 2.64279°W | — | 18th century | The rectory is in stone and brick and has tiled roofs. There are two storeys, four gables on the front, the outed gables projecting, and a gabled porch. All the gables have decorative bargeboards. The windows are sashes with hood moulds. | II |
| Malthouse, Easthope Cottage Farm; 52.55398°N 2.64152°W | — | Late 18th or early 19th century | The malthouse incorporates one bay of a 14th-century timber framed aisled hall, and a 15th-century four-bay solar range. The building has outer walls of red brick and a corrugated asbestos roof. Its openings include windows with segmental heads, and a hoist door. | II* |
