= Listed buildings in Edgton =

Edgton is a civil parish in Shropshire, England. It contains 14 listed buildings that are recorded in the National Heritage List for England. Of these, one is at Grade II*, the middle of the three grades, and the others are at Grade II, the lowest grade. The parish contains the village of Edgton and the surrounding countryside. Apart from a milestone, all the listed buildings are in the village. Most of these are farmhouses, farm buildings, and houses, many of them timber framed and dating from the 16th and 17th centuries. The other listed buildings are a church, and a sundial and a tomb in the churchyard.

== Key ==
Grade	Criteria
II*	Particularly important buildings of more than special interest
II	Buildings of national importance and special interest

== Buildings ==
Name and location	Photograph	Date	Notes	Grade
St Michael's Church; 52.46606°N 2.90445°W		13th century	The church was largely rebuilt in 1895–96. It is in limestone with some sandstone, and has a tiled roof. The church consists of a nave and a chancel in one unit and a northeast vestry. On the west end is a gabled bellcote. Most of the windows are lancets and the two-light east window is in Decorated style.	II
Church Farmhouse; 52.46646°N 2.90367°W	—	Late 16th century	The farmhouse and former malthouse are mainly in limestone with some timber framing and weatherboarding at the rear, and partly roughcast. The roof is partly tiled and partly with corrugated iron. There are two storeys, and an L-shaped plan, with a gabled wing projecting to the rear, two further gables and lean-tos at the rear, and the former malthouse is attached to the left. The windows are casements, there is a stone porch on the cross-wing, and external steps lead up to an upper floor doorway in the malthouse.	II*
Lower House Farmhouse and cowhouse 52.46720°N 2.90304°W	—	Early 17th century	The farmhouse is partly timber framed with woven and rendered infill, and partly in brick, on a stone plinth, and with a slate roof. There is one storey and an attic, and four bays. The windows are casements, and there are two gabled dormers, one large, the other smaller. To the right is an attached cowhouse that is timber framed with weatherboarding on a stone plinth and with a slate roof. (Note: Street View in April 2009 shows that the cowhouse has been converted for domestic use.)	II
Villa Farmhouse; 52.46665°N 2.90309°W	—	Early to mid 17th century	The farmhouse was altered and extended in the 18th century and again in the 19th century. The earlier parts are timber framed with rendered infill, the 18th-century part is on a high limestone plinth, the 19th-century extension is in brick, and the roofs are slated. There are two storeys and a basement, and an L-shaped plan. At the right is a projecting gabled wing with the gable jettied, to the left is a two-bay range, and to the left of that is the brick extension. At the rear is a two-storey limestone extension. The windows are casements, and there is a French window.	II
Barn, Church Farm; 52.46627°N 2.90350°W	—	17th century	The barn is timber framed with weatherboarding on a stone plinth, and has a corrugated iron roof. There are two levels, and it contains eaves hatches and six doorways.	II
5 and 6 Edgton; 52.46731°N 2.90386°W	—	17th century	There have been alterations and additions; the building has been a house, a public house and a shop, and then two houses. The earlier parts are timber framed, partly roughcast, partly rendered, and with some stone. The roof is slated, and there are two storeys and five bays. At the rear are two extensions in red brick, one with one storey, the other with two. The windows are casements.	II
Edgton Farmhouse; 52.46695°N 2.90273°W	—	Mid 17th century	The farmhouse was extended in the late 18th or early 19th century. The early part is timber framed with brick infill on a stone plinth, it has a roof partly tiled and partly in asbestos sheet, and there are two storeys. The extension to the front is at right angles and has two storeys and an attic. The lower part is in limestone, the upper part is in red brick. It has a dentil eaves cornice and a tile roof. The windows are casements, in the extension they have segmental heads, and there are gabled half-dormers.	II
The House on the Green; 52.46657°N 2.90341°W		Mid 17th century	The house was later altered and extended. It is timber framed with rendered infill on a stone plinth, it has a tile roof, and there is brick cladding or replacement at the rear. It has one storey and an attic, two bays, a doorway with a rectangular fanlight, casement windows, and two gabled eaves dormers.	II
Barn and cowhouse, Villa Farm; 52.46659°N 2.90287°W	—	17th century	The farm buildings are timber framed and have infill that is rendered or in concrete blocks, they are mainly weatherboarded, they are on a stone plinth, and have slate roofs. The buildings contain doorways and a vehicle bay.	II
Cowhouse, Church Farm; 52.46627°N 2.90382°W	—	Late 17th century	The cowhouse, with a hayloft above, is timber framed with weatherboarding on a stone plinth, and has a corrugated iron roof. It has doorways on both sides, one on the north side approached by external steps.	II
Manor Farmhouse; 52.46606°N 2.90519°W	—	Late 17th century	The farmhouse, later a private house, was extended and altered in the 18th century. It is in limestone with some dressings in red brick, and a tile roof. The house has a T-shaped plan, the earliest part being the north range, which has probably three bays. There are two storeys, and the north range has a cellar and lean-tos. The windows are casements, and inside the north range are two inglenook fireplaces.	II
Sundial; 52.46600°N 2.90453°W		1749	The sundial is in the churchyard of St Michael's Church. It is in limestone, and consists of a circular column with a moulded plinth and capping on a rectangular chamfered base. On the top is a brass gnomon and the inscribed royal coat of arms of George II and the date.	II
Pedestal tomb 52.46599°N 2.90464°W	—	Late 18th century (probable)	The pedestal tomb is in the churchyard of St Michael's Church. It is in limestone, and has a moulded plinth and capping, semicircular corner piers, a rectangular base, and an urn-shaped finial. The inscription is illegible.	II
Milestone; 52.46399°N 2.90494°W	—	Early to mid 19th century	The milestone is in limestone, and has a rectangular plan and a rounded top. It is inscribed with the distances in miles to London and to Bishop's Castle.	II

== Notes and references ==
=== Sources ===
- Historic England, "Church of St. Michael, Edgton (1176157)", National Heritage List for England
- Historic England, "Church Farmhouse, Edgton (1307992)", National Heritage List for England
- Historic England, "Lower House Farmhouse and attached cowhouse, Edgton (1054953)", National Heritage List for England
- Historic England, "Villa Farmhouse, Edgton (1176227)", National Heritage List for England
- Historic England, "Barn approximately 5 metres south-east of Church Farmhouse, Edgton (1054950)", National Heritage List for England
- Historic England, "Nos. 5 and 6 Edgton (1176267)", National Heritage List for England
- Historic England, "Edgton Farmhouse, Edgton (1176230)", National Heritage List for England
- Historic England, "The House on the Green, Edgton (1054951)", National Heritage List for England
- Historic England, "Barn and cowhouse approximately 10 metres south of Villa Farmhouse, Edgton (1054952)", National Heritage List for England
- Historic England, "Cowhouse approximately 10 metres south-west of Church Farmhouse, Edgton (1176222)", National Heritage List for England
- Historic England, "Manor Farmhouse, Edgton (1367015)", National Heritage List for England
- Historic England, "Sundial approximately 2 metres south-west of nave of Church of St. Michael, Edgton (1054949)", National Heritage List for England
- Historic England, "Pedestal tomb approximately 6 metres south-west of nave of Church of St. Michael, Edgton (1367016)", National Heritage List for England
- Historic England, "Milestone at N.G.R. SO 3861 8551, Edgton (1054954)", National Heritage List for England
- Historic England, Listed Buildings
- Newman, John; Pevsner, Nikolaus (2006), Shropshire, The Buildings of England, New Haven and London: Yale University Press, ISBN 0-300-12083-4
