= Listed buildings in Sidbury, Shropshire =

Sidbury is a civil parish in Shropshire, England. It contains nine listed buildings that are recorded in the National Heritage List for England. Of these, two are listed at Grade II*, the middle of the three grades, and the others are at Grade II, the lowest grade. The parish is entirely rural, and the listed buildings consist of farmhouses, farm buildings and a church.

== Key ==
Grade	Criteria
II*	Particularly important buildings of more than special interest
II	Buildings of national importance and special interest

== Buildings ==
Name and location	Photograph	Date	Notes	Grade
Holy Trinity Church; 52.46898°N 2.46684°W		12th century	The north chapel was added in 1734, and the church was restored and extended in 1881. It is built in sandstone with herringbone masonry in the nave, siltstone in the north chapel, dressings in freestone, and tile roofs. The church consists of a nave, a south porch, and a chancel with a north chapel. At the west end is a timber framed belfry. In the west wall is a blocked Norman doorway.	II*
Outbuilding, Hall Farm; 52.46753°N 2.46736°W	—	16th century	The building is timber framed with brick infill, the ground floor refaced or rebuilt in brick, with some weatherboarding, and a gabled tile roof. There are two storeys and four bays, the fourth bay with a staircase leading to a doorway with a cambered head.	II
Batch Farm House; 52.46400°N 2.47160°W		Early 17th century	A timber framed farmhouse with infill in brick in herringbone pattern. There is a central range with one storey and an attic, two-storey cross-wings, and a later wing to the right. The windows are of mixed types, mainly casements. The interior has been little altered.	II*
Lower House; 52.46843°N 2.46187°W		Early 17th century	A timber framed farmhouse with infill in brick and plaster, and a gabled tile roof. The windows are casements.	II
Old Rectory Farmhouse; 52.46781°N 2.46580°W	—	Early 17th century	A timber framed farmhouse with painted brick nogging and a gabled tile roof. The windows are small casements.	II
Granaries, Batch Farm; 52.46374°N 2.47145°W	—	17th century	The granaries are to the southeast of the farmhouse. They are partly timber framed and partly in brick, and have tile roofs.	II
Barn to north of Lower House; 52.46869°N 2.46181°W	—	17th century	The barn is timber framed with brick nogging in its lower part, and has weatherboarding above and a tile roof.	II
Stable, Hall Farm; 52.46775°N 2.46762°W		Late 17th century	The stable is in red brick with stone angle quoins, and has a gabled tile roof. There are two storeys and six bays. In the centre is a stone doorway with a pediment.	II
Hall Farm House; 52.46800°N 2.46720°W	—	Late 18th century	The farmhouse is in local buff stone and has dentilled eaves and a tile roof with coped gables. It has a square plan, three storeys, and three bays. The windows are casements.	II
