= Listed buildings in Stoke St. Milborough =

Stoke St. Milborough is a civil parish in Shropshire, England. It contains 20 listed buildings that are recorded in the National Heritage List for England. Of these, one is listed at Grade II*, the middle of the three grades, and the others are at Grade II, the lowest grade. The parish contains the village of Stoke St. Milborough and smaller settlements, and is otherwise rural. Most of the listed buildings are farmhouses, farm buildings and houses, the earlier of which are timber framed. The other listed buildings include a church, memorials in the churchyard, two Methodist chapels, and a milepost.

== Key ==
Grade	Criteria
II*	Particularly important buildings of more than special interest
II	Buildings of national importance and special interest

== Buildings ==
Name and location	Photograph	Date	Notes	Grade
Church of St Milburgha; 52.43690°N 2.63937°W		13th century	The church was altered during the following centuries and restored in 1859 and in 1911. It is built in sandstone with tile roofs, and consists of a nave with a south porch, a chancel, and a west tower. The tower contains lancet windows, and has an embattled parapet and a pyramidal roof. The porch is timber framed with brick nogging and a cruck-framed arch.	II*
Lower Moor; 52.41399°N 2.64508°W	—	16th century	A timber framed house with painted brick infill on a concrete plinth, with moulded bressumers, and a tile roof with moulded bargeboards. There is an L-shaped plan, consisting of a range with two storeys and an attic and two bays, and a rear wing with one storey. The windows are casements with chamfered or moulded surrounds.	II
Bockleton Court; 52.44546°N 2.62208°W	—	Late 16th century	A farmhouse that was altered in the 18th century, it is in stone, and has a timber framed core with painted rendered panels on a stone plinth, and a tile roof. There are two storeys and an attic, and an L-shaped plan, with a main range of five bays, and a rear wing with a jettied upper storey and a cellar. The second and fourth bay are gabled and project forward, the fourth bay forming a two-storey porch. The doorway has a moulded surround, and the gables have shaped bargeboards. Some windows are mullioned, some are mullioned and transomed, and some are casements.	II
East Farmhouse; 52.42316°N 2.61713°W	—	Early 17th century	The farmhouse was extended in the 19th century. It is partly in painted timber framing with brick infill, partly in brick, and partly in stone, and has tile roofs. The house has a cruciform plan, consisting of a three-bay main range, and opposing cross-wings. The windows are casements, some are mullioned and transomed, with hood moulds.	II
Moor Farmhouse; 52.41750°N 2.64086°W	—	Early 17th century	The farmhouse, later a private house, was extended in the 19th century. It is timber framed with brick infill on a stone plinth and has a tile roof. There are two storeys and an attic, and an H-shaped plan, consisting of a three-bay hall range and two cross-wings. Most of the windows are casements, some with lattice glazing, and at the rear is an oriel window and a bay window.	II
Barn northeast of Moor Farmhouse; 52.41765°N 2.64065°W	—	Early 17th century	The barn, later used for other purposes, is timber framed with brick infill and weather boarding on a stone plinth and has a tile roof. It contains a stable door with a segmental head and pitching holes, and has lean-to extensions.	II
Barns, Bockleton Court; 52.44546°N 2.62146°W	—	17th century	Two barns at right angles forming an L-shaped plan, both with tile roofs. The older barn is timber framed with weatherboarding on a stone plinth. It has four bays and contains opposing barn doors. The other barn dates from the 18th century and is in stone. It has five bays and contain various openings, including doors, loft openings, vents, a pitching hole, and a dormer.	II
Lower Farmhouse; 52.42220°N 2.61676°W	—	17th century	A farmhouse, later a private house, it is in stone with dentilled eaves and a tile roof. There are three storeys and an attic, a front range of two bays, a central staircase bay, and small flanking side bays. In the centre is a doorway with a chamfered surround, and the windows have mullions. Inside are timber framed partitions.	II
Stables southwest of Moor Farmhouse; 52.41736°N 2.64144°W	—	17th century	The stables and granary are partly timber framed with brick infill on a stone plinth, and partly in stone and brick. The roofs are partly tiled and partly slated, and they form an L-shaped plan.	II
Barn and Cowshed, Stoke Court; 52.43435°N 2.63233°W	—	17th century	The barn and cowshed are at right angles, forming an L-shaped plan, and both have tile roofs. The barn is the older, it is timber framed with weatherboarding on a stone plinth, and has four bays. The cowshed dates from the 18th century, it is in stone, and has five bays, and there is a one-bay link to the barn.	II
Cheese memorial 52.43674°N 2.63936°W	—	Early 18th century	The memorial is in the churchyard of the Church of St Milburgha, and is to the memory of Mary Cheese. It is a headstone in sandstone and consists of a rectangular slab set vertically. On it is an inscribed panel and an ornamental carved head.	II
Stoke Court; 52.43490°N 2.63241°W	—	18th century	The house, which incorporates earlier material, is in red brick on a stone plinth and has a tile roof. There are two storeys, an attic and a cellar, and an L-shaped plan, consisting of a three-bay front range, a long rear wing, and a lean-to on the west side. Four stone steps flanked by low walls lead up to the central doorway that has pilasters and a four-centred arch. The windows are casements, most of them mullioned and transomed, and there is one dormer.	II
Kinson Farmhouse, malthouse and wall 52.43553°N 2.62644°W	—	Late 18th century	The farmhouse, which has an earlier timber framed core, is in brick on a stone plinth, with a storey band and a tile roof. There are two storeys with an attic and cellar, and five bays. The windows are mullioned and transomed with segmental heads. At the rear is a parallel wing, a former malthouse, in stone with a slate roof, and containing casement windows. To the southwest is a stone wall with a brick upper stage, about 2.5 metres (8 ft 2 in) high, leading to a privy.	II
Moor Hall; 52.41601°N 2.64088°W	—	c. 1800	A roughcast house with a hipped slate roof. There are two storeys, and the house consists of a main block with five bays flanked by recessed two-bay wings. In the centre is a portico with four Tuscan columns and a plain entablature with a cornice, and the doorway has pilasters. In the main block the windows are sashes, and in the wings are sash windows, casements, and French windows.	II
Milepost; 52.42350°N 2.61853°W	—	Early 19th century	The milepost on the north side of the B4364 road is in painted cast iron. It has a sloping top plate, and two angled destination plates below. The top plate is inscribed "MOOR CLEE DOWNTON" and on the lower plates the distances in miles to Bridgnorth and to Ludlow.	II
Morgan memorial and railings 52.43683°N 2.63956°W	—	Early 19th century	The memorial is in the churchyard of the Church of St Milburgha, and is to the memory of members of the Morgan family. It is a pedestal tomb in sandstone, and has a plain lid with a moulded cornice and a cross shaft. There are recessed panels, Doric columns in recessed corners, and a plain plinth. The tomb is surrounded by cast iron railings.	II
Vicarage; 52.43658°N 2.63942°W	—	Early 19th century	The vicarage is stuccoed and roughcast and has a hipped slate roof. The main block has three storeys and two bays, to the east is a two-storey service wing, and between is a linking portico with Tuscan columns and an entablature. Most of the windows are sashes.	II
Gate piers and wall, Vicarage; 52.43615°N 2.63843°W	—	Early 19th century	The gate piers at the entrance to the drive are in rendered stone with a square section, and have pyramidal coping. The wall has flat coping, and is between 2.5 metres (8 ft 2 in) and 3 metres (9.8 ft) high. It runs for about 40 metres (130 ft) to the northeast, then about 45 metres (148 ft) to the northwest.	II
Primitive Methodist Chapel, railings and gate 52.43822°N 2.63817°W	—	1842	The chapel is in red brick with a Welsh slate roof and a single storey. The entrance front faces the street, it is gabled and contains a gabled porch flanked by cast iron windows. There is a smaller similar window and a datestone above. The area in front of the chapel is enclosed by cast iron railings and a gate.	II
Blackford Methodist Chapel; 52.44378°N 2.59300°W		1869	The chapel is in brick, partly stuccoed and scored to resemble ashlar, and with a tile roof. It has a single storey, and a rectangular plan with the gable end facing the road containing a gabled porch. The gables have scalloped bargeboards and finials. Flanking the porch are round-headed multi-pane windows.	II
