= Listed buildings in Monkhopton =

Monkhopton is a civil parish in Shropshire, England. It contains four listed buildings that are recorded in the National Heritage List for England. Of these, two are at Grade II*, the middle of the three grades, and the others are at Grade II, the lowest grade. The parish is almost entirely rural, and the listed buildings consist of a church, a monastic grange converted into a farmhouse, a former toll house, and a war memorial.

== Key ==
Grade	Criteria
II*	Particularly important buildings of more than special interest
II	Buildings of national importance and special interest

== Buildings ==
Name and location	Photograph	Date	Notes	Grade
St Peter's Church; 52.53737°N 2.55338°W		12th century	The tower was added in 1835, and the church was extensively restored in about 1840. The church is rendered, and lined out to resemble ashlar. It consists of a nave, a southwest porch, a chancel with a northeast vestry, and an embraced west tower. The tower has a two-light window with a pointed head and Y-tracery, and an embattled parapet. Some of the other windows are round-headed.	II*
Great Oxenbold; 52.52401°N 2.60069°W	—	Mid 13th century	The building originated as a monastic grange of Wenlock Priory. It later developed into a large sandstone farmhouse, which incorporates the remains of the grange.	II*
Corner House; 52.53262°N 2.59475°W	—	Early 19th century	A former toll house, it is in red brick with a slate roof. There is one storey, and the windows are casements with lattice glazing, chamfered surrounds, and hood moulds.	II
War memorial 52.53740°N 2.55305°W	—	1921	The war memorial is in the corner of the churchyard of St Peter's Church, and was restored in 2000. The base is in roughhewn stone, and the plinth is an inverted cider press, on which stands an oak shaft with carved detailing and a Latin cross. On the front of the plinth is a bronze plaque with an inscription including two names. Above this is a metal plaque with an inscription relating to the restoration.	II
