= Listed buildings in Neenton =

Neenton is a civil parish in Shropshire, England. It contains seven listed buildings that are recorded in the National Heritage List for England. Of these, one is at Grade II*, the middle of the three grades, and the others are at Grade II, the lowest grade. The parish contains the village of Neenton and the surrounding countryside, and the listed buildings consist of a church, houses, farmhouses, and a farm building.

== Key ==
Grade	Criteria
II*	Particularly important buildings of more than special interest
II	Buildings of national importance and special interest

== Buildings ==
Name and location	Photograph	Date	Notes	Grade
Bank Farm House; 52.48994°N 2.53111°W	—	16th century (probable)	The farmhouse was later extended. The earliest part is timber framed, the later parts are in brick and stone, and the roof is tiled. There are two storeys, a front of three bays, and a rendered wing on the left. Some windows are casements, and others are modern.	II
Brook Cottage; 52.48918°N 2.53300°W	—	Late 16th century (probable)	The house has since been extended. It is timber framed with brick infill and has a slate roof. There are two storeys, three bays, and a modern extension on the right. The windows are casements, and inside is much exposed timber framing.	II
Churchyard Farmhouse; 52.48600°N 2.53580°W		Late 16th or early 17th century	The farmhouse has since been altered. It is timber framed with brick, and some wattle and daub, infill, parts have been rebuilt in stone with some brick, parts are rendered, and the roof is tiled. There are two storey and cellars, it originally had an L-shaped plan consisting of a two-bay hall range and a three-bay cross-wing, and later the kitchen extension was added in the angle. There is one original mullioned window, the others being modern replacements. Inside the house are the remains of wall paintings.	II*
Barn, Newhouse Farm; 52.48968°N 2.53286°W	—	17th century (probable)	A barn with a cowhouse and loft added in the 18th century. The older part is timber framed with weatherboarding on a stone plinth, the rebuilding and the extension are in limestone, and it has a tile roof. The barn has three bays, and the cowhouse and loft have two. External steps lead up to the upper doorway, and elsewhere are windows, and more doors, including a loading door.	II
Hall Farm House; 52.48799°N 2.53490°W	—	18th century	The farmhouse is in stone with a tile roof. It has two storeys, an L-shaped plan, and a front of four bays. The windows are casements.	II
Wrickton Manor; 52.47150°N 2.52618°W	—	Late 18th century	A brick house that has a tile roof with coped gables. There are two storeys and an attic, and the house consists of two parallel ranges with a front of three bays. The doorway has a blind fanlight and a pediment and the windows are sashes.	II
All Saints Church; 52.48626°N 2.53572°W		1870–71	The church was designed by A. W. Blomfield in Gothic Revival style. It is built in red sandstone with a tile roof, and consists of a nave, a south porch, a lower chancel, and a north organ chamber. At the west end are buttresses and a gabled bellcote.	II
