= Listed buildings in Greete =

Greete is a civil parish in Shropshire, England. It contains 15 listed buildings that are recorded in the National Heritage List for England. Of these, three are at Grade II*, the middle of the three grades, and the others are at Grade II, the lowest grade. The parish contains the hamlet of Greete and the surrounding countryside, and the listed buildings consist of a church, memorials in the churchyard, houses, farmhouses, farm buildings, and a telephone kiosk.

== Key ==
| Grade | Criteria |
|---|---|
| II* | Particularly important buildings of more than special interest |
| II | Buildings of national importance and special interest |

== Buildings ==
| Name and location | Photograph | Date | Notes | Grade |
|---|---|---|---|---|
| St James' Church; 52.33432°N 2.62195°W | | 12th century | The oldest part of the church is the nave, the chancel dates from the 13th century, there were alterations in the 15th and 18th centuries, and the church was restored in 1856. The church is built in stone, partly roughcast, and has a tiled roof with ornamental pierced ridge tiles. It consists of a nave, a south porch, and a chancel. On the west gable is a gabled twin bellcote, and most of the windows are lancets. | II* |
| Lower Cottage; 52.33303°N 2.63153°W | — | 15th century | The main range dates from the 17th century on an earlier core. The house is partly timber framed with cruck construction and brick infill, partly rendered, and partly in brick and stone, and has a tile roof. It has an L-shaped plan, consisting of a main range with two storeys and three bays, and a cross-wing with one storeys and an attic, and two bays. There is a gabled porch, the windows are casements, and there are two gabled dormers. | II |
| Greete Court; 52.33409°N 2.62137°W | | 16th century | The original part of the farmhouse is timber framed with brick infill, it was largely encased and extended in brick on a stone plinth in the 18th century, and the roof is tiled. There are two storeys, an attic and cellar, the original part has three bays with a central cross-gabled bay, there is the 18th-century extension to the south, and a single-storey service wing to the east. Most of the windows are casements. | II* |
| Barn north of Greete Court; 52.33472°N 2.62145°W | — | 17th century | The barn is timber framed, it is clad in corrugated metal, and has a tile roof. There are five bays, and it contains barn doors. | II |
| Stoke Court; 52.33782°N 2.63928°W | | c. 1700 | A brick house that has a hipped slate roof with coped gables, a central lantern, and a weathervane. There are two storeys an attic and cellar and a U-shaped plan with a two-storey double-depth five-bay main range, and two-bay cross-wings with shaped gables. The central doorway has a plain surround and a pedimented canopy on projecting carved brackets. Most of the windows are sashes with moulded surrounds. | II* |
| Stables, Stoke Court; 52.33794°N 2.63976°W | — | Early 18th century | The stables are in brick, partly on a stone plinth, with a tile roof and coped gables. There is a single storey and a loft, five bays, and a single-storey extension. It contains loft openings, casement windows, stable doors, and a blocked coach house entrance. | II |
| Stoke Farmhouse; 52.33923°N 2.64347°W | — | 18th century | The farmhouse was extended in the 19th and 20th centuries, and is in brick with slate roofs. There are two storeys and an attic, and a U-shaped plan consisting of a three-bay main range, and projecting gabled cross-wings. The windows are mullioned and transomed with segmental-arched lintels, and there is an open porch with a tented roof. | II |
| Brick House Farmhouse; 52.33427°N 2.62292°W | | c. 1760 | The farmhouse is in brick with a storey band and a hipped tile roof. There are two storeys, attics and a cellar, and a square plan, with a symmetrical front of five bays and four bays on the sides. It has a rendered porch, the doorway has a chamfered and moulded surround. and the windows are casements with segmental heads, some of which are blind or blocked. On the west side is a bow window, and at the rear are a 19th-century two-storey coach house extension and a single-storey gabled wing. | II |
| Evans Memorial; 52.33421°N 2.62194°W | — | Late 18th century | The memorial is in the churchyard of St James' Church, and is to the memory of Thomas Evans. It is a headstone in ashlar stone, and is inscribed on both sides. On one side is a heart-shaped raised inscribed tablet with foliate decorated borders, and on the other side is a raised tablet with inset quadrant corners and foliate decoration. | II |
| Group of two slab tombs 52.33432°N 2.62171°W | — | Mid to late 18th century | The tombs are in the churchyard of St James' Church, and are to the memory of members of the Smith family. They consist of sandstone slabs on brick plinths. One slab has a plain lid with a moulded edge, and the other has a lid with incised ornament at corners and a plain edge. | II |
| Elizabeth Mason Memorial; 52.33426°N 2.62175°W | — | Late 18th century | The memorial is in the churchyard of St James' Church, and is to the memory of Elizabeth Mason. It is a chest tomb in sandstone, and has a plain plinth and a moulded chamfered bed, inscribed side panels, one with carved motifs including a skull, a crown, ribbons, a vase and crossed bones, and the other with a raised border and festoons, and a flat plain lid with moulded edges. | II |
| Griffin Memorial; 52.33427°N 2.62182°W | — | Early 19th century | The memorial is in the churchyard of St James' Church, and is to the memory of members of the Griffin family. It is a chest tomb in ashlar stone, and has a plain plinth, inscribed side and end panels, projecting corner pieces, and a plain shallow pyramidal lid. | II |
| Edward Mason Memorial; 52.33425°N 2.62181°W | | Early 19th century | The memorial is in the churchyard of St James' Church, and is to the memory of Edward Mason and his wife. It is a chest tomb in sandstone, and has a plain chamfered plinth, inscribed semicircular side panels with gadrooned spandrel carving, beaded and gadrooned corner piers, and a flat plain lid. | II |
| Richard Mason Memorial; 52.33424°N 2.62190°W | — | Early to mid 19th century | The memorial is in the churchyard of St James' Church, and is to the memory of Richard Mason and his wife. It is a chest tomb in sandstone, and has a plain chamfered plinth and a moulded bed, inscribed side panels, inset corner pillars with scroll capitals and moulded bases, and a saddleback lid with a moulded edge. | II |
| Telephone kiosk 52.33394°N 2.62304°W | | 1935 | A K6 type telephone kiosk, designed by Giles Gilbert Scott. Constructed in cast iron with a square plan and a dome, it has three unperforated crowns in the top panels. | II |
