= Listed buildings in Stanton Lacy =

Stanton Lacy is a civil parish in Shropshire, England. It contains 22 listed buildings that are recorded in the National Heritage List for England. Of these, one is listed at Grade I, the highest of the three grades, one is at Grade II*, the middle grade, and the others are at Grade II, the lowest grade. The parish contains the village of Stanton Lacy and smaller settlements, and is otherwise rural. Most of the listed buildings are houses, farmhouses and farm buildings, many of which are timber framed, or have a timber-framed core. The other listed buildings consist of a church, a sundial in the churchyard, a country house and associated buildings, a milestone, a war memorial, and a telephone kiosk.

== Key ==
Grade	Criteria
I	Buildings of exceptional interest, sometimes considered to be internationally important
II*	Particularly important buildings of more than special interest
II	Buildings of national importance and special interest

== Buildings ==
Name and location	Photograph	Date	Notes	Grade
St Peter's Church; 52.40509°N 2.74305°W		11th century	The chancel dates from the 13th century, and the aisle, transept, and tower from the 14th century. The church was restored in 1847–49 by T.H. Wyatt, who added the east window and the vestry. The church is built in sandstone and has tiled roofs. It consists of a nave, a south aisle, a south porch, a north transept, a chancel, a north vestry, and a tower with an embattled parapet at the crossing. The doorway has Saxon and Norman features, and in the south wall are two external tomb recesses.	I
Witchcot; 52.43193°N 2.68862°W	—	16th or 17th century	A house partly timber framed with wattle and daub infill, some of it rendered, and partly in stone, with a tile roof. There are two storeys and an L-shaped plan. On the front is a gabled porch, most of the windows are casements, and two are mullioned.	II
3 Stanton Lacy; 52.40570°N 2.74096°W		17th century	Two houses later combined into one, it is timber framed with plastered brick and stone panels, and has a cedar shingle roof. There are two storeys, three bays, and a lean-to on the left. On the front is a gabled porch, and the windows are casements, some with hoods.	II
4 Stanton Lacy; 52.40567°N 2.74034°W		17th century	A timber framed house with later additions in painted brick, and a tile roof. There are two storeys, two bays, and a 19th-century rear wing. The windows are casements with lattice glazing, some with hoods, and in the rear wing is a semi-dormer.	II
7 The Hope; 52.40217°N 2.72109°W	—	17th century	The house is in timber framing and plaster with some painted brick infill, on a stone plinth, and with a tile roof. There is a single storey, an attic and a basement, two bays, and a stone outshut on the left. The porch is in stone, and the windows are casements.	II
Bank House; 52.42607°N 2.71436°W	—	17th century	The house is partly timber framed, partly in brick and partly in stone, and it has a tile roof. There is one storey and an attic, and two bays. The windows are casements, and to the left is a massive detached chimney stack.	II
Barns, Church Farm; 52.40552°N 2.74304°W	—	17th century	A group of farm buildings, including barns and stables, that were extended in the following centuries. The oldest barns are timber framed with weatherboarding on sandstone plinths, the later buildings are in brick, and the roofs are tiled. The buildings form an L-shaped plan, and include various openings, and steps up to a granary.	II
Downton Hall and balustrade 52.40945°N 2.69501°W		17th century	A country house that dates mainly from extensions and alterations in the 18th and 19th centuries. It is in brick with stone dressings, a string course, a parapet with a balustrade, and Welsh slate roofs. There are three storeys, and an E-shaped plan with an extension on the right. The east front has a main block of nine bays, the outer two bays at each end projecting, and a recessed three-bay wing on the right. Most of the windows are sashes, those in the projecting bays with moulded architraves and sills with corbels. In the left return is a doorway with a fanlight and a moulded pediment hood on attached columns, and at the rear is a portico with Doric columns and pilasters. Linking the wings and flanking the steps is a balustrade.	II*
Stables and outbuildings, Downton Hall; 52.40973°N 2.69502°W	—	17th century	The range of service buildings was extended in the 18th and 19th centuries. They are partly in brick, partly in stone, with some weatherboarding, and have roofs partly of slate and partly of tile, and are arranged around a courtyard. The buildings have two storeys, and the front range has seven bays, the middle three bays projecting under a pediment containing a clock. The range has pilasters, arches with stuccoed keystones, sash windows, and fixed windows. In the other ranges the windows include casements, cross-windows and fixed windows.	II
Langley; 52.41914°N 2.75556°W	—	17th century	A house, partly timber framed and partly in brick, on a sandstone plinth, with moulded bressumers and a tile roof. There are two storeys and an L-shaped plan, consisting of a three-bay range, a projecting three-bay right wing, and an outshut on the left. The doorway has a gabled porch with a spike finial and a moulded architrave. The windows are mullioned and transomed and contain casements with lattice glazing, and at the rear is a roof dormer.	II
Barn north of Witchcot; 52.43230°N 2.68910°W	—	17th century	The barn is timber framed, clad in corrugated iron, and has a corrugated iron roof.	II
The Old Post Office; 52.40552°N 2.73920°W		Late 17th century (probable)	The house, which has been altered and extended, is timber framed on a stone plinth. There is one storey and an attic, and five bays, the right bay gabled. The doorway and windows have hoods, and there are two gabled dormers.	II
10 The Hope; 52.39972°N 2.71968°W	—	Late 17th or early 18th century	The house is in stone with a thatched roof, and has a single storey and attic, and a T-shaped plan. It consists of a main range, an outshut at each end, and a rear wing in brick over stone and with a tile roof. The windows are casements, and there are gabled dormers.	II
The Old Thatched Cottage; 52.40041°N 2.72084°W	—	Late 17th or early 18th century	A stone house with a thatched roof, it has one storey and an attic. There is a single-storey extension to the right in brick with weatherboarding and a tile roof, and a lean-to on the left with weatherboarding and a thatched roof. The windows are casements, and there are two dormers.	II
The Manor House; 52.40536°N 2.74022°W	—	18th century	The house, which probably has an earlier core, has been divided into two dwellings. It is in brick and stone, and has a storey band and a tile roof. There are two storeys, an attic and a cellar, and the house has a cruciform plan. The doorway has a moulded surround, and the windows are sashes.	II
West Lodge and outbuildings, Downton Hall; 52.40850°N 2.70180°W		c. 1760	The lodge is in stuccoed brick with a storey band and a Welsh slate roof. There are two storeys and an attic, one bay, and an attached outhouse with a tile roof. In the centre is a doorway with an ogee head flanked by lancet windows, and above it is an ogee-headed Venetian window flanked by recessed quatrefoil panels. At the top is gable with an ogee parapet containing a quatrefoil light in a raised architrave.	II
Ayntree Farmhouse; 52.41104°N 2.77530°W		Early 19th century	The farmhouse is in brick on a stone plinth, and has a hipped Welsh slate roof. There are three storeys, three bays, and a single-storey outhouse at the rear. The doorway has a porch and a moulded surround, and the windows are casements, those in the top floor with mullions, and in the lower floors also with transoms.	II
Church Farmhouse; 52.40579°N 2.74277°W	—	Early 19th century	A brick farmhouse with a hipped tile roof. There are three storeys and a cellar, three bays, and a rear wing. In the centre is a timber gabled porch with pierced bargeboards and a finial, and the round-headed doorway has panelled pilasters, a fanlight, and a moulded open pedimented hood on consoles with guttae. The windows are a mix of sashes, casements, and a cross-window.	II
Milestone; 52.40462°N 2.74878°W	—	Early 19th century	The milestone is on the east side of the B4365 road. It is in sandstone, about 1 metre (3 ft 3 in) high, and 0.3 metres (1 ft 0 in) wide, and is inscribed with the distance in miles to Ludlow.	II
Orchard House; 52.42441°N 2.72999°W	—	Early 19th century	A brick house with modillion eaves and a Welsh slate roof. There are three storeys, three bays, and a two-storey lean-to at the right. The doorway has a semicircular head, a fanlight, and a moulded open pediment, and the windows are sashes.	II
War memorial 52.40494°N 2.74314°W		c. 1920	The war memorial is in the churchyard of St Peter's Church. It is in limestone, and consists of a wheel-head cross with a sword in relief on the north side. The cross has a tapered shaft, and stands on a tapered plinth on a two-stepped base. On the lower part of the shaft is an inscription, and the names of those lost in the First World War are on the plinth and the upper step. On the east side of the plinth are the names of those lost in the Second World War, and there is a plaque with an inscription relating to a recipient of the Victoria Cross.	II
Telephone kiosk 52.41933°N 2.66727°W		1935	A K6 type telephone kiosk, designed by Giles Gilbert Scott. Constructed in cast iron with a square plan and a dome, it has three unperforated crowns in the top panels.	II
