= Listed buildings in Boraston =

Boraston is a civil parish and a village in Shropshire, England. It contains eleven listed buildings that are recorded in the National Heritage List for England. Of these, two are listed at Grade II*, the middle of the three grades, and the others are at Grade II, the lowest grade. All the listed buildings are in the village, and they include a church, houses, farmhouses and farm buildings, and a telephone kiosk. Many of the buildings date from the 16th and 17th centuries and they are basically timber framed.

== Key ==
Grade	Criteria
II*	Particularly important buildings of more than special interest
II	Buildings of national importance and special interest

== Buildings ==
Name and location	Photograph	Date	Notes	Grade
Parish Church; 52.32710°N 2.56854°W		12th century	The church was almost entirely rebuilt in 1884–87. It is in stone with tiled roofs, and consists of a nave, a south porch, a chancel with a north vestry, and a west tower. The chancel has a canted apse, the vestry has a pyramidal roof, and the porch is timber framed. The tower has a weatherboarded bell stage, and a shingled broach spire. In the nave is a blocked Norman doorway.	II
Lower House Farmhouse; 52.32626°N 2.56611°W		Late 16th century	The farmhouse was extended in the 17th and 19th centuries. It has a timber framed range with brick and rendered infill on a stone plinth, and a cross-wing and extensions in brick. The roof is tiled, and the house has two storeys and an attic. The main range has two bays, and the upper floor is jettied. The windows are casements, and the gable of the cross-wing is crow-stepped.	II*
Myddle House Farmhouse and oast house 52.32650°N 2.56652°W		c. 1600	A farmhouse, later a private house, a rear wing was added in the 17th century, and service wings in the 18th century. It is partly in brick, and partly timber framed with brick and rendered infill on a brick plinth, and has tiled roofs. The house has two storeys with a cellar and attic, and consists of a three-bay front range, a three-bay cross-wing at the rear, and service bays. The upper floor at the front was originally jettied, but has been underbuilt; on other fronts the jettying remains. In the left return is a porch with a chamfered doorway, and the windows are casements. At the rear is a square brick oast house with a slate roof.	II*
Rose Cottage; 52.32624°N 2.56731°W		Early 17th century|	A farmhouse, later a private house, it was extended in the 19th century, and altered in the 20th century. The house is partly in brick and partly timber framed with brick and rendered infill. It has hipped and gabled tile roofs. There is a single storey and an attic, and an L-shaped plan, consisting of a timber framed range and a later cross-wing. The windows are casements, there are flat-roofed dormers, and canopies over the doorways.	II
Court Cottages; 52.32767°N 2.56648°W		17th century	A pair of houses that were extended to the rear in the 19th century. They are timber framed with rendered infill on a stone plinth, the rear extensions are gabled and in brick, and the roof is tiled. There are two storeys and attics, and each house has one bay. To the left of each house is a doorway with a tiled canopy, the windows are casements, and at the rear each house has a doorway with a segmental head.	II
Myttons Cottage; 52.32839°N 2.57042°W		17th century	The house was extended and restored in the 20th century. It is timber framed with brick and rendered infill on a brick plinth, and has a tile roof. There is a single storey and an attic, a two-bay front, and gabled extensions at both ends. The windows are 20th-century multi-pane casements, there are two dormers, and a gabled porch.	II
Barn and cowhouse, Boraston Court; 52.32727°N 2.56719°W		Mid to late 18th century	The barn and cowhouse are in red brick with dentil eaves and tiled roofs. The barn has three bays, and the cowhouse with granary form a cross-wing to the rear, giving an L-shaped plan. In the centre of the barn is an entrance with a segmental arch and around it are ventilation holes in diamond patterns; elsewhere the ventilation holes are evenly spread. At the rear are openings with segmental-arched lintels. The wing contains casement windows and segmental-arched openings, and on the gable end steps lead up to a door.	II
Boraston Court; 52.32741°N 2.56749°W		Late 18th century	The farmhouse was extended in the 19th century and includes an earlier wing. It is in brick with dentil eaves, and has a timber framed wing partly with brick infill, and partly weatherboarded. There is a hipped slate roof, and the house has an H-shaped plan plus the timber framed wing. The front has two projecting wings; the central range and the right wing have two storeys and the left wing has three. The windows are sashes, many with segmental heads. Above the door in the central range is a flat canopy.	II
Barn and hop kilns, Boraston Court; 52.32761°N 2.56709°W		Late 18th century	The barn and hop kilns are in brick with dentil eaves, the barn has a tiled roof, and the hop kilns have two slate hipped roofs. The barn has five bays, and the hop kilns form a cross-wing at the end. On the north and south front are four full-height niches, three with ventilation holes in diamond patterns, and one with a doorway, and there is a barn entrance with a segmental head.	II
Boraston House; 52.32759°N 2.56864°W		Late 18th century	A red brick house with dentil eaves and a hipped and gabled tile roof. It has a square plan, three storeys and a symmetrical front of three bays. In the centre is a projecting portico with Tuscan columns and a Doric entablature. The doorway has pilasters and a fanlight with radial and festoon glazing bars. The windows on the front are sashes, and elsewhere they are casements.	II
Telephone kiosk, 52.32632°N 2.56683°W		1935	A K6 type telephone kiosk, designed by Giles Gilbert Scott. Constructed in cast iron with a square plan and a dome, it has three unperforated crowns in the top panels.	II
