= Tasley, Shropshire =

Village in Shropshire, England

Coordinates: 52.544°N 2.448°W

Tasley
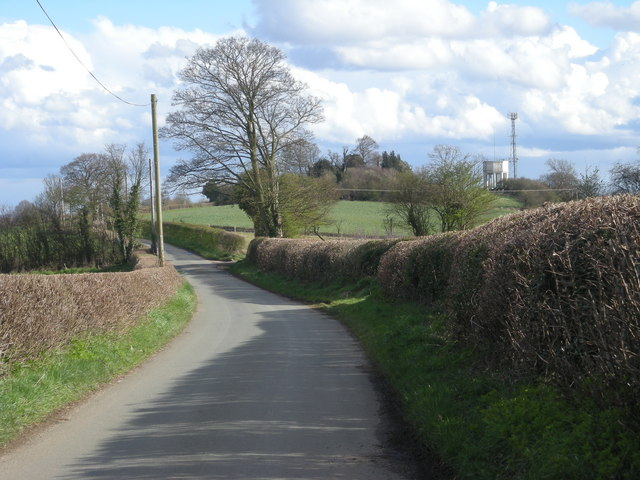

- Location within Shropshire
- Civil parish: Tasley
- Unitary authority: Shropshire
- Ceremonial county: Shropshire
- Region: West Midlands
- Country: England
- Sovereign state: United Kingdom
- Post town: BRIDGNORTH
- Postcode district: WV16
- Dialling code: 01746
- Police: West Mercia
- Fire: Shropshire
- Ambulance: West Midlands
- UK Parliament: Ludlow

Tasley is a village and civil parish in Shropshire, England.

It is located to the immediate west of the town of Bridgnorth, and the A458 road passes through. As well as the small historic village and farms, the parish includes some modern suburban housing and livestock market/auction hall that form part of the built-up area of Bridgnorth.

The village is located on a hill, with an elevation of 125 metres (410 ft), and has a church building dedicated to St Peter and St Paul, built 1840–1.

== See also ==
- Listed buildings in Tasley
