= Listed buildings in Aston Eyre =

Aston Eyre is a civil parish in Shropshire, England. It contains eight listed buildings that are recorded in the National Heritage List for England. Of these, three are listed at Grade II*, the middle of the three grades, and the others are at Grade II, the lowest grade. The parish contains the small village of Aston Eyre but is otherwise rural. Most of the listed buildings are farmhouses and farm buildings, the others being a church and a bridge.

== Key ==
| Grade | Criteria |
|---|---|
| II* | Particularly important buildings of more than special interest |
| II | Buildings of national importance and special interest |

== Buildings ==
| Name and location | Photograph | Date | Notes | Grade |
|---|---|---|---|---|
| Parish Church; 52.54349°N 2.51289°W | | Late 12th century | The church was restored in the 19th century when the bellcote and porch were added. It is built in sandstone with freestone quoins and dressings, and has a clay tile roof with plain ridge tiles. It consists of a nave, a lower and narrower chancel, and a south porch. On the west gable is a bellcote. The reconstructed 12th-century south doorway has a round arch, and in the tympanum is a carving of Christ's entry into Jerusalem. | II* |
| Hall Farm House; 52.54418°N 2.51259°W | — | 1341–52 | The oldest part is a medieval gatehouse which was enclosed by the surrounding farmhouse in the 17th to 19th centuries. The building is partly timber framed with brick infill, partly in stone, and partly in brick, some of which is rendered. The roof is tiled, with a brick ridge. The house has a complex plan. The former gatehouse forms the main range, and has three storeys and two bays. To the left is a two-storey brick wing containing a square bay window, to the right is a brick and stone wing with one storey and a loft. At the rear are a 17th-century timber-framed wing and a 19th-century wing. | II* |
| Barns to west of Hall Farm House; 52.54397°N 2.51334°W | | 15th century | Originally part of a medieval house with possibly an earlier core. It is in sandstone with a tiled roof, and has an L-shaped plan. The main part was the hall, and the solar is at right angles, with stone stairs leading to the upper floor. | II* |
| Barn range northwest of Hall Farm House; 52.54426°N 2.51300°W | — | 1613 | The barn range was extended in the 18th century and rebuilt in the 19th century. The central four bays are timber framed and weatherboarded, with a brick bay to the right and 19th-century rebuilding on the left. The roof is tiled, and there is a single storey with a loft. It contains doorways, windows, and ventilation crosses. | II |
| East Farm House; 52.54311°N 2.51179°W | — | Early 17th century (probable) | The farmhouse is timber framed with brick infill on a stone plinth, and has a tiled roof. There are two storeys, and the windows are casements, those in the upper floor in gabled dormers. | II |
| Ouseley Farmbuildings; 52.55040°N 2.52512°W | — | Early 17th century (probable) | The range of farm buildings was altered in the 18th century. They are in stone and brick with a tile roof, and form a T-shaped plan. They include a three-bay barn win the cruck truss and ventilation holes, a barn to the rear with five bays and opposing doorways, and a six-bay cowhouse. | II |
| Barns to west of East Farm House; 52.54318°N 2.51209°W | — | 17th century (probable) | The barns are timber framed with brick infill on a stone plinth. The roofs are tiled. | II |
| Ash Bridge; 52.54533°N 2.49366°W | — | Late 18th century (probable) | The bridge carries the B4368 road over Mor Brook. It is in stone and consists of a single arch. The bridge has a keyblock, string courses, and an ashlar parapet. | II |
