= Kemberton =

Village in Shropshire, England

Coordinates: 52°38′12″N 2°24′16″W

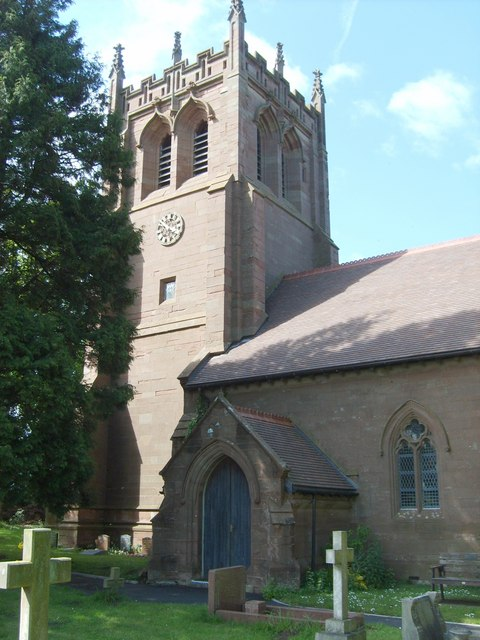

- Location within Shropshire
- Population: 244 (2011)
- Unitary authority: Shropshire
- Ceremonial county: Shropshire
- Region: West Midlands
- Country: England
- Sovereign state: United Kingdom
- Post town: Shifnal
- Postcode district: TF11
- Dialling code: 01952
- Police: West Mercia
- Fire: Shropshire
- Ambulance: West Midlands
- UK Parliament: North Shropshire

Kemberton is a village and civil parish located in Shropshire, England. The population of the civil parish at the 2011 Census was 244.

== See also ==
- Listed buildings in Kemberton
