= St Peter's Church, Adderley =

Coordinates: 52.9522°N 2.5059°W

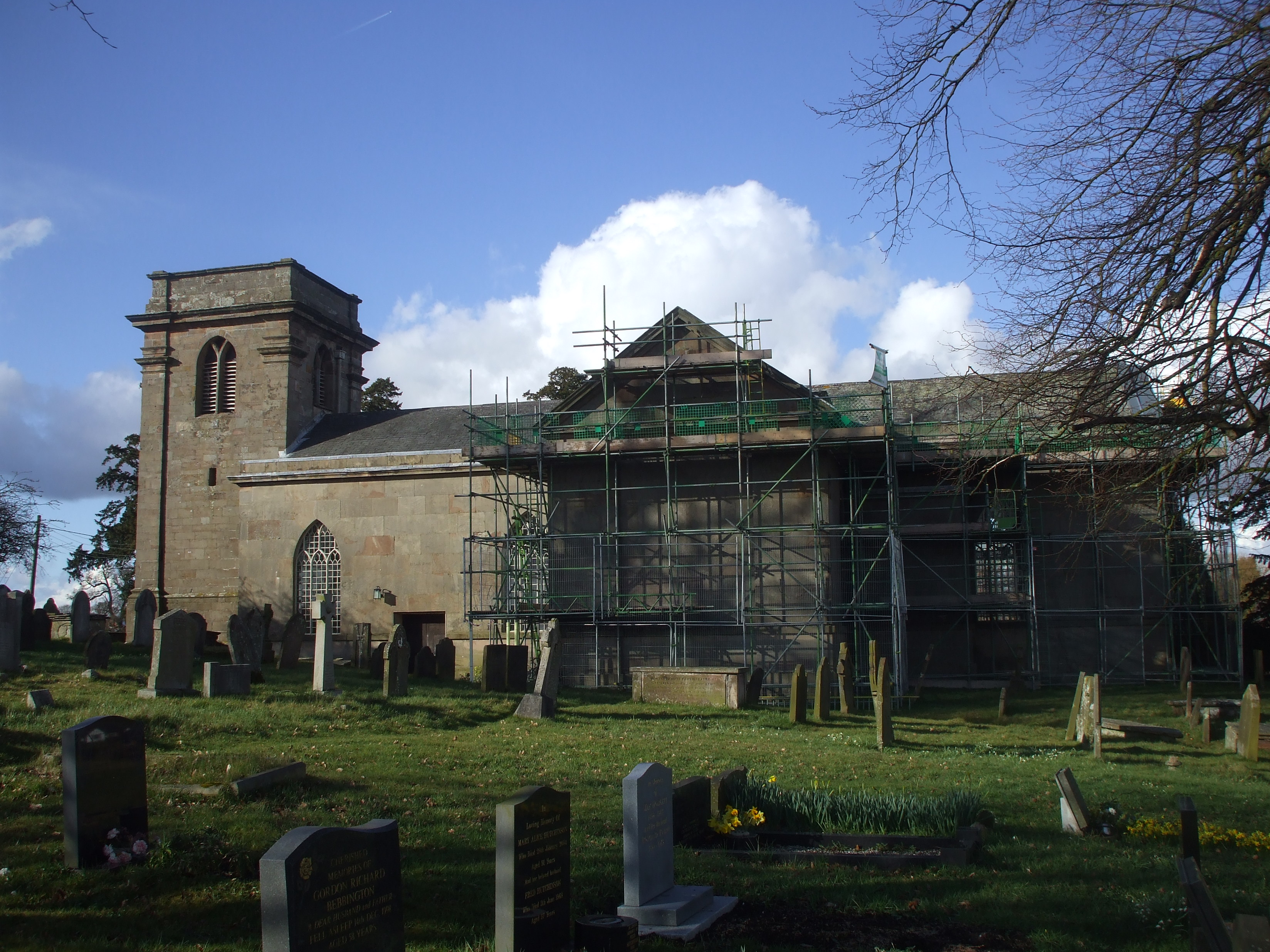
- St Peter's Church, Adderley, from the south

- Location in Shropshire
- OS grid reference: SJ 66110 39542
- Location: Adderley, Shropshire
- Country: England
- Denomination: Anglican
- Website: Churches Conservation Trust

History
- Status: Parish church
- Dedication: Saint Peter

Architecture
- Functional status: Partly active, partly redundant
- Heritage designation: Grade I
- Designated: 10 February 1959
- Architect: Richard Baker
- Architectural type: Church
- Style: Gothic, Gothic Revival
- Completed: 1801

Specifications
- Materials: Sandstone, slate roofs

Administration
- Province: York
- Diocese: Litchfield
- Archdeaconry: Salop
- Deanery: Hodnet
- Parish: Adderley

St Peter's Church is an Anglican church in the village of Adderley, Shropshire, England. It is recorded in the National Heritage List for England as a designated Grade I listed building, The church has a dual function. Its nave and tower form an active parish church in the united benefice of Adderley, Ash, Calverhall, Ightfield and Moreton Say, in the deanery of Hodnet, the archdeaconry of Salop, and the diocese of Lichfield. The chancel and transepts are under the care of The Churches Conservation Trust.

== History ==
The oldest existing part of the present church is the north transept, which was built in 1635–36 as a burial chapel for the Needham family, the Viscounts Kilmorey of Shavington. The other remaining part of the older church is the tower, built in 1712. The rest of the church was built in 1801 by Richard Baker; it is the only known work by this architect. The chancel was restored in 1822. The interior of the church was divided in about 1970 (the church's own records show this taking place in 1956) for the nave to continue in use as a parish church, and the rest of the church to be preserved by the Churches Conservation Trust.

== Architecture ==
=== Exterior ===
The church is constructed in yellow-grey sandstone, with some red sandstone in the tower. The roofs are in slate. Its plan is cruciform, with a three-bay nave, a single-bay chancel and transepts, and a west tower. There is an apsidal end to the chancel and the south transept. The tower is in two stages on a plinth. At the corners are Doric pilasters. In the lower stage is a round-headed west doorway. The upper stage contains two-light louvred bell openings. At the top is a moulded cornice, and a plain parapet. The north transept (Kilmorey chapel) has a battlemented parapet with crocketed pinnacles at the corners and on the apex of the gable. It contains a three-light north window, a two-light east window, and a west doorway with four steps leading up to it. The remainder of the church has a plain parapet. Each of the gable ends has a triangular pediment, and on the north and south gables are small gabled finials. The windows have pointed arches and Gothic-style tracery. The windows have cast iron frames and tracery in Perpendicular style. These were made in nearby Coalbrookdale. On the south side of the nave is a pair of doors.

=== Interior ===
The church is divided between the nave and the rest of the church. At the entrance to the north transept is an elaborately carved wooden screen dating from about 1637 with Tuscan columns. The chancel screen dates from 1908, includes Corinthian columns, and was probably made by C. Hodgson Fowler. The font is large, square, and Norman in style. Its carving includes rosettes and volutes, and it contains a medieval inscription in Latin, which translates as "Here wickedly the first man enjoyed the apple with his wife". The wooden pulpit is hexagonal and dates from about 1801. On each side of the tower arch are Commandment boards, and in the vestry, under the tower, is a benefactors board. Above the south doorway are tablets inscribed with the Lord's Prayer and the Creed. There is a fireplace in the west wall of the north transept. The stained glass consists of twelve heraldic panels containing the Needham family arms. The oldest monument is a brass dating from about 1390. Another brass commemorates Sir Robert Needham who died in 1556 and his wife, Agnes who died in 1560. This brass was lifted c. 1970 under the supervision of Peter Scott, Paul Dinsdale, and Brian Egan, members of the Monumental Brass Society, together with local resident Albert Edwards, as it had loosened in its setting and required to be relaid. It was discovered to be a 'palimpsest' - i.e. an earlier brass, probably fourteenth century Flemish in origin, which had been cut up and re-used by engraving the reverse side. There are other memorials to members of the Needham family.

== External features ==
There are two structures in the churchyard that are listed Grade II. One is a red sandstone sundial dating from the 18th century consisting of a square base, a square shaft, and a cubic block containing a wrought iron gnomon and a globe finial. (The sundial was taken as part of a theft at the church a number of years ago and has never been recovered.) The other is a mounting block dating from 1774 consisting of four sandstone steps.

== See also ==
- Grade I listed churches in Shropshire
- Listed buildings in Adderley
- List of churches preserved by The Churches Conservation Trust in the English Midlands
