= Grade II* listed buildings in Telford and Wrekin =

There are over 20,000 Grade II* listed buildings in England. This page is a list of these buildings in the district of Telford and Wrekin in Shropshire.

== Telford and Wrekin ==
Name	Location	Type	Completed (Note: The date given is the date used by Historic England as significant for the initial building or that of an important part in the structure's description.)	Date designated	Grid ref. (Note: Sometimes known as OSGB36, the grid reference is based on the British national grid reference system used by the Ordnance Survey.) Geo-coordinates	Entry number (Note: The "List Entry Number" is a unique number assigned to each listed building and scheduled monument by Historic England.)	Image
Church of St Michael and All Angels	Chetwynd, Telford and Wrekin	Church	1865-1867	18 June 1959	SJ7356221310; 52°47′19″N 2°23′36″W	1054109	Church of St Michael and All Angels More images
Church of St. Luke	Sambrook, Chetwynd, Telford and Wrekin	Church	1856	8 April 1983	SJ7145924494; 52°49′02″N 2°25′30″W	1205992	Church of St. Luke More images
Manor Farmhouse	Sambrook, Chetwynd, Telford and Wrekin	Farmhouse	Early 18th century	8 April 1983	SJ7141524748; 52°49′10″N 2°25′32″W	1206032	Upload Photo
Parish Church (chapel)	Woodcote, Chetwynd Aston and Woodcote, Telford and Wrekin	Chapel	Late 12th century	18 June 1959	SJ7676215415; 52°44′09″N 2°20′44″W	1292305	Upload Photo
Church Aston Manor	Church Aston, Telford and Wrekin	House	Earlier Core	4 January 1954	SJ7423417676; 52°45′22″N 2°23′00″W	1367402	Upload Photo
Longford Hall	Longford, Church Aston, Telford and Wrekin	Country House	1794-1797	18 June 1959	SJ7286218251; 52°45′40″N 2°24′13″W	1208541	Longford Hall More images
Talbot Chapel	Longford, Church Aston, Telford and Wrekin	Church	13th century	18 June 1959	SJ7259718452; 52°45′47″N 2°24′27″W	1037009	Talbot Chapel More images
Provosts House	Edgmond, Telford and Wrekin	House	Early 14th century	18 June 1959	SJ7196919212; 52°46′11″N 2°25′01″W	1367393	Upload Photo
Arcade to South East of Ercall Hall	High Ercall, Ercall Magna, Telford and Wrekin	Arcade	c. 1608	18 June 1959	SJ5941417377; 52°45′09″N 2°36′10″W	1038605	Arcade to South East of Ercall Hall
Ercall Hall	High Erscall, Ercall Magna, Telford and Wrekin	House	1608	4 January 1952	SJ5941417420; 52°45′10″N 2°36′10″W	1187259	Ercall Hall More images
Church of St. Catherine	Eyton upon the Weald Moors, Telford and Wrekin	Church	1743	18 June 1959	SJ6509714835; 52°43′48″N 2°31′06″W	1038622	Church of St. Catherine More images
Church of St Leonard	Malinslee, Great Dawley, Telford and Wrekin	Church	1805	26 March 1968	SJ6890108117; 52°40′12″N 2°27′41″W	1367391	Church of St Leonard More images
Stables at Apley Castle	Apley, Hadley & Leegomery, Telford and Wrekin	Manor House	Early to Mid 14th century	8 April 1983	SJ6548913178; 52°42′55″N 2°30′44″W	1201614	Stables at Apley Castle More images
Church of St Chad	Kynnersley, Telford and Wrekin	Church	Medieval	18 June 1959	SJ6727216703; 52°44′49″N 2°29′11″W	1374541	Church of St Chad More images
Church of St Lawrence	Little Wenlock, Telford and Wrekin	Church	Medieval	8 April 1983	SJ6470406839; 52°39′29″N 2°31′24″W	1208381	Church of St Lawrence More images
Church of St Michael	Madeley, Telford and Wrekin	Church	1796	8 April 1983	SJ6962504091; 52°38′01″N 2°27′01″W	1293011	Church of St Michael More images
Former Water Mill South of Madeley Court	Madeley, Telford and Wrekin	Watermill	17th century	8 April 1983	SJ6955305066; 52°38′33″N 2°27′05″W	1033281	Upload Photo
Garden Walls North West and West of Madeley Court	Madeley, Telford and Wrekin	Walls	Late 17th century	8 April 1983	SJ6946305174; 52°38′36″N 2°27′10″W	1033280	Upload Photo
Gatepiers West of the Old Vicarage	Madeley, Telford and Wrekin	Gate	Modern	8 April 1983	SJ6963104144; 52°38′03″N 2°27′01″W	1208716	Gatepiers West of the Old Vicarage
Madeley Court	Madeley, Telford and Wrekin	House	16th century	8 April 1983	SJ6954905153; 52°38′36″N 2°27′05″W	1352026	Madeley Court More images
Sundial immediately West of Madeley Court	Madeley, Telford and Wrekin	Sundial	17th century	8 April 1983	SJ6949805151; 52°38′36″N 2°27′08″W	1352027	Upload Photo
The Old Hall	Madeley, Telford and Wrekin	Apartment	c. 1980	8 April 1983	SJ6945104238; 52°38′06″N 2°27′10″W	1208643	The Old Hall
The Old Vicarage	Madeley, Telford and Wrekin	House	c. 1700	8 April 1983	SJ6964804138; 52°38′03″N 2°27′00″W	1352023	The Old Vicarage More images
Central Block, Adams' Grammar School	Newport, Telford and Wrekin	Grammar School	1656	28 April 1952	SJ7433719146; 52°46′09″N 2°22′54″W	1054359	Central Block, Adams' Grammar School More images
Chetwynd House	Newport, Telford and Wrekin	House	Mid 18th century	28 April 1952	SJ7429019458; 52°46′20″N 2°22′57″W	1054385	Upload Photo
Church of St Nicholas of Myra	Newport, Telford and Wrekin	Parish Church	14th century	28 April 1952	SJ7450519186; 52°46′11″N 2°22′46″W	1178337	Church of St Nicholas of Myra More images
Old Guildhall	Newport, Telford and Wrekin	House	c. 1400	28 April 1952	SJ7460518892; 52°46′01″N 2°22′40″W	1177807	Old Guildhall More images
Hoo Hall	Horton, Preston upon the Weald Moors, Telford and Wrekin	House	19th century	18 June 1959	SJ6847514812; 52°43′48″N 2°28′06″W	1025044	Upload Photo
Longdon Hall	Longdon-on-Tern, Rodington, Telford and Wrekin	House	Late 16th century	18 June 1959	SJ6226115392; 52°44′05″N 2°33′37″W	1037002	Upload Photo
Walcot Bridge	Walcot, Rodington, Telford and Wrekin	Road Bridge	1782	8 April 1983	SJ5931312395; 52°42′28″N 2°36′13″W	1033347	Walcot Bridge More images
Church of Holy Trinity	Coalbrookdale, The Gorge, Telford and Wrekin	Church	1850-1854	8 April 1983	SJ6705304465; 52°38′13″N 2°29′18″W	1280353	Church of Holy Trinity More images
Coalbrookdale Institute (premises of YHA)	Coalbrookdale, The Gorge, Telford and Wrekin	Institute	c. 1859	26 March 1968	SJ6703404310; 52°38′08″N 2°29′19″W	1054148	Coalbrookdale Institute (premises of YHA) More images
Former Coalport Chinaworks	Coalport, The Gorge, Telford and Wrekin	Brick Kiln	1792	26 March 1968	SJ6955502436; 52°37′08″N 2°27′04″W	1206637	Former Coalport Chinaworks More images
Rose Cottage	Coalbrookdale, The Gorge, Telford and Wrekin	Timber Framed House	1642	8 April 1983	SJ6684604068; 52°38′00″N 2°29′29″W	1367408	Rose Cottage More images
Severn Wharf Building (premises of Ironbridge Gorge Museum Trust)	Ironbridge, The Gorge, Telford and Wrekin	Warehouse	Mid to Late 19th century	26 March 1968	SJ6678203638; 52°37′46″N 2°29′32″W	1293325	Severn Wharf Building (premises of Ironbridge Gorge Museum Trust) More images
Snapper Furnace	Coalbrookdale, The Gorge, Telford and Wrekin	Blast Furnace	1792	8 April 1983	SJ6679404883; 52°38′26″N 2°29′32″W	1280325	Snapper Furnace
The Bedlam Furnace	Ironbridge, The Gorge, Telford and Wrekin	Blast Furnace	Early 18th century	26 March 1968	SJ6782003358; 52°37′37″N 2°28′37″W	1207904	The Bedlam Furnace More images
The Grange (The Grove)	Coalbrookdale, The Gorge, Telford and Wrekin	House	Early/Mid 18th century	8 April 1983	SJ6666604961; 52°38′29″N 2°29′39″W	1206355	The Grange (The Grove)
The Market Buildings	Ironbridge, The Gorge, Telford and Wrekin	Market Hall	Early 19th century	8 April 1983	SJ6729503468; 52°37′41″N 2°29′05″W	1279601	The Market Buildings More images
The Tontine Hotel	Ironbridge, The Gorge, Telford and Wrekin	Hotel	c. 1800	8 April 1983	SJ6724603471; 52°37′41″N 2°29′07″W	1207874	The Tontine Hotel More images
The Valley Hotel	Coalbrookdale, The Gorge, Telford and Wrekin	House	18th century	9 August 1974	SJ6644403790; 52°37′51″N 2°29′50″W	1054130	The Valley Hotel More images
Warehouse with Clock Tower	Coalbrookdale, The Gorge, Telford and Wrekin	Iron Works	c. 1792	8 April 1983	SJ6673804720; 52°38′21″N 2°29′35″W	1206215	Warehouse with Clock Tower More images
Cherrington Manor House	Tibberton and Cherrington, Telford and Wrekin	House	19th century	8 April 1983	SJ6660220162; 52°46′41″N 2°29′48″W	1205917	Cherrington Manor House
Church of St. John the Baptist	Great Bolas, Waters Upton, Telford and Wrekin	Church	Medieval	18 June 1959	SJ6473521353; 52°47′19″N 2°31′28″W	1367430	Church of St. John the Baptist More images
The Hall	Waters Upton, Telford and Wrekin	House	Early 18th century	18 June 1959	SJ6338219519; 52°46′19″N 2°32′39″W	1352005	The Hall
Arleston Manor House	Arleston, Wellington, Telford and Wrekin	Hunting Lodge	17th century	18 June 1959	SJ6657810376; 52°41′24″N 2°29′45″W	1351989	Arleston Manor House
Church of All Saints	Wellington, Telford and Wrekin	Church	1790	8 April 1983	SJ6511111719; 52°42′07″N 2°31′04″W	1033317	Church of All Saints More images
Cluddley Farmhouse	Cluddley, Wrockwardine, Telford and Wrekin	Farmhouse	18th century	8 April 1983	SJ6318710261; 52°41′20″N 2°32′46″W	1217801	Upload Photo
Gazebo East of Orleton Hall	Watling Street, Wrockwardine, Telford and Wrekin	Gazebo	18th century	18 June 1959	SJ6361211286; 52°41′53″N 2°32′24″W	1033349	Gazebo East of Orleton Hall
Orleton Hall	Watling Street, Wrockwardine, Telford and Wrekin	House	Pre 18th century	18 June 1959	SJ6345611283; 52°41′53″N 2°32′32″W	1033348	Orleton Hall More images
Wrockwardine Hall	Wrockwardine, Wrockwardine, Telford and Wrekin	House	1628	8 April 1983	SJ6248112111; 52°42′19″N 2°33′24″W	1218001	Upload Photo
