= Listed buildings in Moreton Say =

Moreton Say is a civil parish in Shropshire, England. It contains 21 listed buildings that are recorded in the National Heritage List for England. Of these, two are at Grade II*, the middle of the three grades, and the others are at Grade II, the lowest grade. The parish includes villages and smaller settlements, including Bletchley, Longford, and Moreton Say, and is otherwise rural. Most of the listed buildings are houses and cottages, farmhouses and farm buildings, the earliest of which are timber framed, one with cruck construction. The other listed buildings include a small country house and associated structures, a church and a tomb in the churchyard, a milepost, and a pump.

== Key ==
Grade	Criteria
II*	Particularly important buildings of more than special interest
II	Buildings of national importance and special interest

== Buildings ==
Name and location	Photograph	Date	Notes	Grade
Oldfields Farmhouse; 52.92332°N 2.55390°W	—	Early 15th century (probable)	The farmhouse was altered and extended in the 17th and 19th centuries. It is timber framed with cruck construction, the rebuilding and extensions are in brick and the roof is tiled. The original part has one storey and an attic, and consists of a quasi-aisled hall with three bays, and there is a rebuilt cross-wing to the southeast and a later extension to the southwest, both with two storeys. The windows are casements, and there are two small gabled eaves dormers. Inside is a central base cruck truss.	II*
Glynde Cottage; 52.90165°N 2.53008°W	—	16th century	The house was later altered and extended. The original part is timber framed with cruck construction and brick nogging on a brick plinth, and with a tile roof. There are two storeys, two bays, and a single-storey extension to the right. The doorway has a gabled porch, and the windows are casements.	II
Bletchley Manor; 52.89799°N 2.56341°W	—	Late 16th century	The farmhouse was altered and extended in the 19th century. The original part is timber framed and rendered, and the rebuilding and refacing are in brick, with applied timber and painting to resemble timber framing. The farmhouse has a three-span tile roof with three gables and three bays at the front. The original part has two storeys and an attic, and the extension has two storeys. There is a central doorway with a moulded architrave and a timber-framed gabled porch. The windows are cross-windows, and there is a sash window in the extension.	II
Holly Cottage; 52.90202°N 2.52833°W	—	Late 16th century	The cottage was altered and extended in the 19th and 20th centuries. The original part is timber framed with plaster infill, it has been partly rebuilt and underbuilt in brick, and the roof is tiled. There is one storey and an attic, two bays, and a one-storey lean-to at each end. The windows are casements, and at the rear are a lean-to porch and gabled eaves dormers.	II
The Old Smithy; 52.91326°N 2.51451°W	—	1600	Alterations and additions were made later to the cottage, which is timber framed with brick nogging on a rendered plinth, the extensions are in brick, and the roof is tiled. There are two storeys, originally with two bays and later extensions. There are two gabled porches, and the windows are casements.	II
The Royal Oak Farmhouse; 52.89886°N 2.56270°W	—	c. 1600	The farmhouse, at one time an inn, was extended in the 19th century. It is timber framed with plaster infill on a sandstone plinth, the extension is in brick, and the roof is tiled. There is one storey and an attic, and an H-shaped plan, with a central range of one bay, cross-wings of two bays each, and a single bay in the angle at the rear. The cross-wings have jettied upper floors with moulded bressumers on scrolled brackets, and the gables are also jettied with decorative bressumers. The windows are casements, and in the middle range is a large gabled dormer.	II
Longford Old Hall; 52.90236°N 2.52991°W	—	Early 17th century	The farmhouse is timber framed with brick infill, underbuilding in brick, and a tile roof. There are two storeys and an attic, and an H-shaped plan, consisting of a central single-bay range, two gabled cross-wings, each with two bays, and a single-storey lean-to at the rear. The doorway has a chamfered surround, the windows are casements, and there is a central gabled full dormer.	II
Rhiews Farmhouse; 52.93260°N 2.53775°W	—	Early to mid 17th century	The farmhouse, later a private house, has been altered and extended. It is timber framed with brick nogging on a brick plinth, and extended in brick painted to resemble timber framing, one gable end is rendered, and the roof is tiled. There are two storeys, two bays, an extension to the southeast, and a rear wing. The windows are casements, and there is a lean-to porch.	II
New Street Lane Farmhouse; 52.92929°N 2.54336°W	—	17th century	The farmhouse was remodelled in the 18th century and extended in the 19th century. It is in red brick with a timber framed core, on a plinth, with quoins, a dentil eaves cornice, and a tile roof. The farmhouse is partly in one storey, and partly in two storeys with an attic, there are three bays, and a rear wing. The windows are casements, some with segmental heads, and some with Gothick arches, and there is a gabled porch.	II
Styche Hall; 52.91768°N 2.53005°W		1762–66	A small country house designed by William Chambers, altered in 1796–98 by Joseph Bromfield, and altered again in about 1900. It is in brick with a hipped tile roof. There are three storeys and a basement, and a square plan with sides of seven and six bays. The central doorway has a moulded architrave, and a porch with fluted Corinthian pilasters, an entablature, and a triangular pedimented gable. This is flanked by full-height canted bay windows, and the other windows are sashes.	II
Stychefields Residential Home and The Coach House; 52.91830°N 2.52955°W	—	1763–66	Originally the stables and coach house for Styche Hall designed by William Chambers, they are in red brick with grey sandstone dressings, and have hipped tile roofs. The stables from an L-shaped plan around a courtyard with fronts of seven and five bays, with the former coach house in the southeast corner. There are two storeys, the windows are casements, and in the centre of each block is a window with a moulded architrave, a pulvinated frieze, and a moulded cornice. The round-arched entrance has a moulded architrave, flanking Tuscan pilasters and a full entablature. On the roof is a wooden cupola with a clock, a tented lead cap, and a weathervane.	II
Nobridge Farmhouse; 52.92355°N 2.52325°W	—	Mid to late 18th century	The farmhouse, which incorporates a 17th-century core, is in red brick with a plat band and a tile roof with coped and parapeted gable ends. There are three storeys and five bays, a kitchen wing, and attached coach house and stables. The windows are sashes, and the doorway has pilasters, a frieze, a cornice, and a bracketed hood.	II
St Margaret's Church; 52.90629°N 2.55157°W		1769	The oldest substantial part of the church is the tower, and the nave and chancel were added in 1788, incorporating a 12th-century core. The church was restored and the porch was added in 1900. The church is built in red brick with grey sandstone dressings, the east end was rebuilt or refaced in red sandstone in 1900, and the roof is tiled. It consists of a nave and a chancel in one unit, a south porch, and a west tower. The tower has three stages and a low parapet with corner obelisks, Along the sides of the church are two tiers of round-headed windows, there is a string course, and quoins on the corners. The porch is gabled and has a Tudor arched entrance.	II*
Markham memorial 52.90628°N 2.55184°W	—	1778	The memorial is in the churchyard of St Margaret's Church, and is to the memory of John James Markham Bart. It is a pedestal tomb in grey sandstone with a large sandstone base. The tomb has a moulded plinth, square panels, a moulded cornice, a hollow chamfered top, and an ovoid finial.	II
Milepost near Fordhall Cottages; 52.89472°N 2.52368°W	—	Early to mid 19th century	The milepost is on the southeast side of the A53 road. It is in cast iron, and has a triangular section with a chamfered top. The milepost is inscribed with the distances in miles to "SALOP" (Shrewsbury) and to "DRAYTON" (Market Drayton).	II
Granary, Oldfields Farm; 52.92329°N 2.55416°W	—	Early to mid 19th century	The granary, which incorporates some 14th-century material, is timber framed with red brick nogging on a red sandstone plinth, the rear wall is rebuilt in brick, and the roof is tiled. There is one storey and a loft, three bays, and a one-storey brick extension to the left. The granary contains doorways and loft openings, and in the extension are a window and a stable door, both with segmental heads.	II
Pump, Oldfields Farmhouse; 52.92336°N 2.55371°W	—	Mid to late 19th century	The pump is in cast iron, and has a circular shaft with moulded rings and spout, a fluted top, a fluted domed cap, and a handle with winding mechanism. There is also a stone trough.	II
Pool Cottage; 52.92413°N 2.57037°W	—	1872	An estate cottage by William Eden Nesfield. It is timber framed with plaster infill on a red brick plinth, and in brick painted to resemble timber framing. The roof is tiled and partly hipped, the gables are tile-hung, and there are globe finials on the apices. There is one storey and an attic and an irregular T-shaped plan. The windows are mullioned and transomed, and other features include canted bay windows, jettied attics with moulded bressumers, a polygonal-arched entrance, and an attic oriel window.	II
Outbuilding, Pool Cottage; 52.92419°N 2.57029°W	—	c. 1872	The outbuilding is in red brick with a dentil eaves cornice and a hipped tile roof. It has one storey, a casement window, and a pair of segmental-headed doors.	II
Tern Hill House Farmhouse; 52.88597°N 2.54222°W		Late 19th century	The farmhouse is in red brick with a plat band and a dentil eaves cornice, and a hipped slate roof. There are three storeys, three bays, and a single-storey rear wing. The central doorway has unfluted attached Doric columns and an entablature, and the windows are sashes.	II
The Haven; 52.91104°N 2.55873°W	—	1876	An estate cottage by William Eden Nesfield. It is timber framed with plaster infill on a red brick plinth, and in brick painted to resemble timber framing. The roof is tiled and partly hipped, the gables are tile-hung, and there are globe finials on the apices. There is one storey and an attic and an irregular T-shaped plan. The windows are mullioned and transomed, and other features include canted bay windows, jettied attics with moulded bressumers, a polygonal-arched entrance, and an attic oriel window.	II
