= Talbot Chapel, Longford =

Coordinates: 52.7630°N 2.4075°W

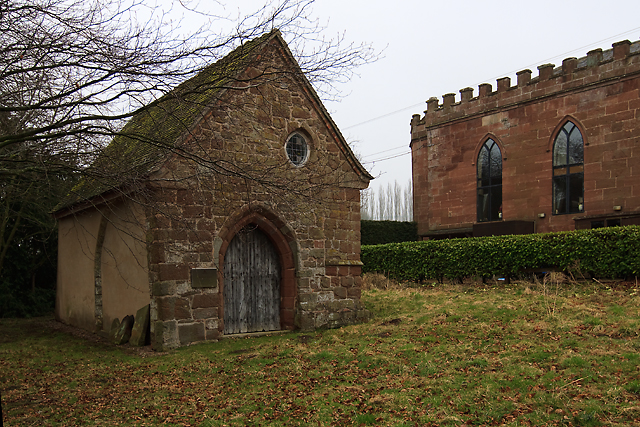
- Talbot Chapel (at left)

- Location in Shropshire
- OS grid reference: SJ 725 184
- Location: Longford, Shropshire
- Country: England
- Denomination: Anglican
- Website: Churches Conservation Trust

Architecture
- Functional status: Redundant
- Heritage designation: Grade II*
- Designated: 18 June 1959
- Style: Gothic
- Groundbreaking: Late 13th century

Specifications
- Materials: Sandstone, tiled roof

Talbot Chapel is the remaining part of a redundant Anglican church in the village of Longford, Shropshire, England. It has been designated by English Heritage as a Grade II* listed building, and is under the care of the Churches Conservation Trust. It stands beside St Mary's Church, which replaced the former medieval church.

== History ==
The original church was built in the late 13th century, and it was almost completely demolished in 1802. What remains is its south chancel chapel, which was preserved because it was owned by the Earls of Shrewsbury. It is now the mortuary chapel of the Talbot family.

== Architecture ==
The chapel is constructed in sandstone, and has a tiled roof with gables. The doorway is in the west side. There are two pairs of lancet windows on the north side, and a window at the east consisting of five lancets under one arch. In the south wall is a blocked arch that formerly connected the chapel to the rest of the church. In the chapel is a piscina set on a corbel. In the floor is a tomb-slab dating from the 14th century carved with a cross and the head of a youth. The major feature of the chapel is a large wall monument to Thomas Talbot, who died in 1686 and his wife, Anne, who died in 1706. It consists of a long panel bearing an inscription praising the virtues of the couple. This is surrounded by twisted Corinthian columns, an entablature with a segmental pediment, and carved drapery containing putti. The monument is surrounded by iron railings.

== See also ==
- Grade II* listed buildings in Telford and Wrekin
- Listed buildings in Church Aston
- List of churches preserved by the Churches Conservation Trust in the English Midlands
