= Listed buildings in Adderley =

Adderley is a civil parish in Shropshire, England. It contains 26 listed buildings that are recorded in the National Heritage List for England. Of these, one is listed at Grade I, the highest of the three grades, and the others are at Grade II, the lowest grade. Apart from the village of Adderley, the parish is rural. Two country houses were demolished in the 1950s, Adderley Hall, and Shavington Hall, but a number of structures associated with them have survived and are listed, including stable blocks, farmhouses and farm buildings, and bridges. The Shropshire Union Canal passes through the parish, and a number of bridges and two mileposts associated with it are listed. The other listed buildings include a church and associated structures.

== Key ==
Grade	Criteria
I	Buildings of exceptional interest, sometimes considered to be internationally important
II	Buildings of national importance and special interest

== Buildings ==
Name and location	Photograph	Date	Notes	Grade
Shavington Wood Farmhouse; 52.94892°N 2.57078°W	—	1536	A farmhouse that has been altered and extended, the original part is timber framed with plastered and painted infill. The 18th and 19th-century extensions are in brick, and the house has a tiled roof, one storey and an attic. The entrance front has three gabled dormers, a doorway with a moulded architrave, and a timber framed porch. Most windows are casements, and the right gable is slightly jettied with a moulded bressumer.	II
Barn, Shavington Wood Farm; 52.94909°N 2.57147°W	—	c. 1600	The barn is timber framed with weatherboarding, and it has been partly rebuilt with red brick nogging. The left wall has been rebuilt in brick, and the barn has a corrugated iron roof. It contains doors, loft doors and lozenge-shaped vents.	II
St Peter's Church; 52.95219°N 2.50593°W		1635–37	The oldest part of the church is the north transept, the tower was built in 1712, and the rest of the church in 1801. The church is built in sandstone and has slate roofs. It has a cruciform plan, consisting of a nave, north and south transepts, a chancel and a west tower. The chancel and south transept have apsidal ends. The tower has two stages, with Doric pilasters, a moulded cornice, and a plain parapet. The north transept has an embattled parapet with crocketed pinnacles. The church has been divided internally, the nave being used as a parish church, and the rest of the church being under the care of the Churches Conservation Trust.	I
Stable block, Shavington Gardens; 52.94480°N 2.54258°W	—	c. 1685	The stable block was extended at the rear in the 19th century, forming a courtyard plan. It is in red brick with grey sandstone dressings, chamfered quoins, a moulded eaves cornice, and a hipped slate roof. There are two storeys, and the east front has seven bays. In the centre is a round-arched carriageway with rusticated surround, flanked by segmental-arched openings. At the top is an open triangular pediment containing a clock face in the tympanum. On the roof is an octagonal wooden cupola with fluted Greek Doric columns, a moulded cornice, and a lead dome with a weathervane.	II
Ice House, Pool House; 52.95998°N 2.50161°W	—	18th century	The ice house is in the grounds of Pool House. It consists of an entrance passage in red brick with a barrel vaulted roof that leads to a domed central chamber.	II
Sundial; 52.95258°N 2.50583°W		18th century (probable)	The sundial stands in a triangle of grass to the north of St Peter's Church. It is in red sandstone, and has a base of two steps, a tapered square shaft with chamfered corners, a cubic dial block with wrought-iron gnomons, and a globe finial.	II
Mounting block 52.95246°N 2.50602°W		1774	The mounting block is to the north of St Peter's Church. It is in sandstone and consists of four steps.	II
Estate bridge 52.94067°N 2.53401°W	—	Late 18th century	The bridge is in Shavington Park, and carries an estate track over the River Duckow. It is in sandstone, and consists of two segmental arches with round-topped semicircular cutwaters and flanking pilaster buttresses. The parapet has a moulded string course and square end piers with globe finials. Approaching the bridge are quadrant wing walls.	II
Shavington Bridge (northwestern); 52.94671°N 2.52999°W	—	Late 18th century (probable)	One of a pair of bridges carrying a road over the River Duckow. It is in grey sandstone, and consists of two segmental arches with round-topped circular cutwaters and flanking pilaster buttresses. The parapet has a moulded string course and square end piers with globe finials. Approaching the bridge are quadrant wing walls.	II
Shavington Bridge (southeastern); 52.94659°N 2.52958°W		Late 18th century (probable)	One of a pair of bridges carrying a road over the River Duckow. It is in red sandstone, and consists of a single segmental arch with flanking pilaster buttresses. The parapet has a moulded string course and square end piers. Approaching the bridge are quadrant wing walls.	II
Former stable block, Adderley Hall Farm; 52.95574°N 2.50933°W	—	c. 1787–88	The former stable block is in red brick with dressings in grey sandstone and a hipped slate roof. It has two storeys and consists of four ranges around a square courtyard. The main front on the west has eleven bays. There is a central elliptical-headed carriageway above which is a pediment with a moulded cornice and a clock in the tympanum. On the roof is a square wooden bellcote with a lead cap, a globe finial and a weathervane. The windows are sashes, some of which have been blocked.	II
Church Farmhouse; 52.95299°N 2.50563°W	—	c. 1790	The farmhouse is in red brick on a plinth, with a dentil eaves cornice and a hipped tile roof. There are three storeys and a basement, and a symmetrical front of five bays, the central three bays projecting forward under a pediment. There is a central round-headed doorway with a fanlight, and the windows are casements.	II
Bridge No. 67 (Bettoncoppice Bridge); 52.93915°N 2.49136°W		c. 1830	An accommodation and roving bridge crossing the Shropshire Union Canal, it is in sandstone, and consists of a single elliptical arch with a hump back deck. The bridge has voussoirs, a flush keystone, a chamfered string course, and a parapet with rounded coping and a square end pier to the north. The abutments are slightly battered and curved, and the towpath and accommodation part of the bridge are divided by a stone wall.	II
Bridge No. 68 (Adderley Lees Bridge); 52.94459°N 2.49099°W		c. 1830	An accommodation bridge carrying a track over the Shropshire Union Canal, it is in sandstone, and consists of a single elliptical arch with a hump back deck. The bridge has voussoirs, a raised keystone, a chamfered string course, and a parapet with square end piers and rounded coping. The abutments are battered and curved, and there are cast iron corner posts.	II
Bridge No. 69 (Adderley Wharf Bridge); 52.94867°N 2.49193°W		c. 1830	The bridge carries a road over the Shropshire Union Canal, it is in sandstone, and consists of a single elliptical arch. The bridge has voussoirs, a flush keystone, a chamfered string course, and a parapet with square end piers and rounded coping. The abutments are battered and curved, and there are cast iron corner posts.	II
Bridge No. 70 (Wems Bridge); 52.95093°N 2.49273°W		c. 1830	An accommodation bridge carrying a track over the Shropshire Union Canal, it is in red brick with dressings in blue brick, and consists of a single elliptical arch with a hump back deck. The bridge has a chamfered string course, and a parapet with square end piers and rounded stone coping. The abutments are slightly battered and curved, and there are cast iron corner posts.	II
Bridge No. 71 (Massey's Bridge); 52.95332°N 2.49352°W		c. 1830	An accommodation bridge carrying a track over the Shropshire Union Canal, it is in red brick with dressings in blue brick, and consists of a single elliptical arch with a hump back deck. The bridge has a chamfered string course, and a parapet with square end piers and rounded stone coping. The abutments are slightly battered and curved, and there are cast iron corner posts.	II
Bridge No. 72 (Hawksmoor Bridge); 52.95760°N 2.49501°W		c. 1830	The bridge carries Rectory Lane over the Shropshire Union Canal, it is in red brick with dressings in blue brick, and consists of a single elliptical arch with a hump back deck. The bridge has a chamfered string course, and a parapet with square end piers and rounded stone coping. The abutments are slightly battered and curved, and there are cast iron corner posts.	II
Bridge No. 73 (Adderley Pool Bridge); 52.96095°N 2.49922°W		c. 1830	An accommodation bridge carrying a track over the Shropshire Union Canal, it is in red brick with dressings in blue brick, and consists of a single elliptical arch with a hump back deck. The bridge has a chamfered string course, and a parapet with square end piers and rounded stone coping. The abutments are slightly battered and curved, and there are cast iron corner posts.	II
Milepost near Bridge No. 70; 52.95143°N 2.49277°W	—	c. 1830	The milepost is on the towpath of the Shropshire Union Canal to the north of bridge no. 70. It is in cast iron, and consists of a cylindrical round-topped post carrying three convex plates indicating the distances in miles to Nantwich, Autherley Junction and Norbury Junction.	II
Milepost near Bridge No. 73; 52.96493°N 2.50471°W		c. 1830	The milepost is on the towpath of the Shropshire Union Canal to the south of bridge no. 73. It is in cast iron, and consists of a cylindrical round-topped post carrying three convex plates indicating the distances in miles to Nantwich, Autherley Junction and Norbury Junction.	II
No. 1 Tittenley Lodge; 52.93654°N 2.52814°W		1885	One of a pair of entrance lodges to Shavington Park designed by Norman Shaw. It is in orange brick with sandstone dressings, chamfered quoins, a moulded dentil eaves cornice, and a lead pyramidal roof. The chimney is in the centre of the roof, and has quoins, stone coping and globe finials on the corners. The lodge has a square plan and two storeys. Steps with low flanking walls lead up to the central doorway that has a porch on supports, and there is a square window to the right. In the returns are Venetian windows, and the upper floor contains a Diocletian window on each front. At the rear is a walled garden enclosure.	II
Retaining wall southeast of No. 1 Tittenley Lodge; 52.93646°N 2.52820°W	—	1885	The wall is in red brick with sandstone dressings and chamfered stone coping. It has a quadrant plan, and square end piers with recessed panels and moulded stone caps with globe finials.	II
No. 2 Tittenley Lodge; 52.93646°N 2.52848°W		1885	One of a pair of entrance lodges to Shavington Park designed by Norman Shaw. It is in orange brick with sandstone dressings, chamfered quoins, a moulded dentil eaves cornice, and a lead pyramidal roof. The chimney is in the centre of the roof, and has quoins, stone coping and globe finials on the corners. The lodge has a square plan and two storeys. Steps with low flanking walls lead up to the central doorway that has a porch on supports, and there is a square window to the left. In the returns are Venetian windows, and the upper floor contains a Diocletian window on each front. At the rear is a walled garden enclosure.	II
Retaining wall southwest of No. 2 Tittenley Lodge; 52.93644°N 2.52832°W	—	1885	The wall is in red brick with sandstone dressings and chamfered stone coping. It has a quadrant plan, and square end piers with recessed panels and moulded stone caps with globe finials.	II
7 and 8 Shavington Park; 52.95073°N 2.54138°W	—	c. 1903	A pair of estate cottages in red brick with tile-hung gables and attics, and a tiled roof, hipped at the rear. They have one storey and attics, a U-shaped plan with a front face of four bays, rear wings and a one-storey service block between them. The porches are pebbledashed, the gables have plain bargeboards, the windows are casements, and in the upper floor are dormers.	II
