= Bletchley (disambiguation) =

Bletchley may refer to:

- Bletchley, a constituent town of Milton Keynes, in Buckinghamshire, England.
- Bletchley, Shropshire

== See also ==
- Bletchley Park
- The Bletchley Circle (television series)
