= Moreton Say =

Village in Shropshire, England

Coordinates: 52.905°N 2.551°W

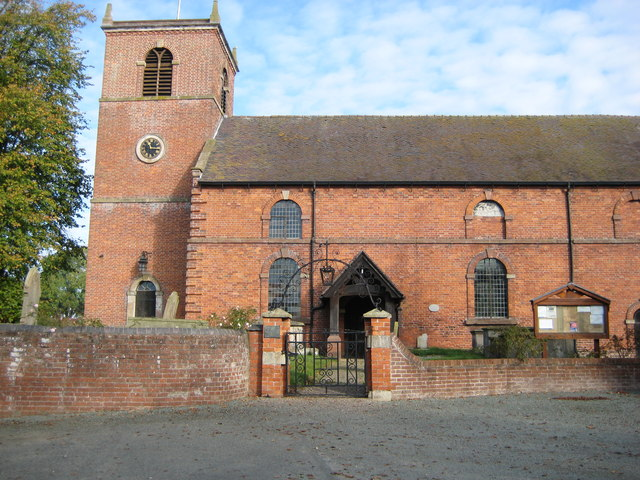
- St Margaret's Church, Moreton Say

- Location within Shropshire
- Population: 485 (2011)
- OS grid reference: SJ629343
- Civil parish: Moreton Say
- Unitary authority: Shropshire
- Ceremonial county: Shropshire
- Region: West Midlands
- Country: England
- Sovereign state: United Kingdom
- Post town: Market Drayton
- Postcode district: TF9
- Dialling code: 01630
- Police: West Mercia
- Fire: Shropshire
- Ambulance: West Midlands
- UK Parliament: North Shropshire

Moreton Say is a small village and sparsely populated civil parish in Shropshire, England, near the borders with Cheshire and Staffordshire, just northwest of the town of Market Drayton. It is sometimes spelled Moreton Saye or Moreton Sea. The civil parish, which also covers the hamlets of Longford and Longslow, had a total population of 429 at the 2001 census, increasing to 485 at the 2011 Census. The parish is 5,999 acres (9.373 sq mi; 24.28 km^{2}).

There are no shops or services within the village. As a result, the only employment opportunities are at the local primary school, a residential home, and surrounding farms.

Robert Clive, 1st Baron Clive, "Clive of India", who is credited with securing India and the wealth that followed for the British crown was born in the parish at Styche Hall and is buried in St Margaret's Church.

Every year the village holds a flower and produce show during summer, where villagers and people from the local community can compete in many classes such as best vegetable and fruit, flowers, crafts, and cookery as well as other classes.

== Parish Church ==
St Margaret's Church, dedicated to St Margaret of Antioch, dates back to the 12th century, when it was founded as a chapel of Hodnet, It is a brick structure which was completed in 1788. It comprises a chancel and nave, with a porch to the south and a square steeple tower to the west which contains two bells, which were left to the parishioners by the commissioners of Edward VI in 1553, along with another small bell as well as a silver chalice and paten.

The interior of the church contains several monuments of the Vernon, Clive and Corser families, one of which is a modern memorial to Robert Clive, who is recorded in the parish register as having been baptised on 2 October 1725, and buried at the church on 30 November 1774, there is also a 17th-century tomb to John Bostock and Jane his wife.

Within the Churchyard Extension, next to the road, is the parish war memorial in form of an ornate carved stone cross, with names of dead from World War I on the obverse, and those of World War II dead on the reverse.

Moreton Say parish, which covers an area of nearly 6000 acres, includes the villages of Longford, Bletchley, Styche with Woodlands, and Tern Hill. The parish is in the diocese of Lichfield which also includes the parishes of Ash, Adderley, Ightfield and Calverhall.

== Education ==
Moreton Say C.E. Controlled Primary School

Moreton Say Primary School is a coeducational Church of England controlled primary school with 90 pupils on roll, separated into four classes of mixed ages of two-year groups in each, and is maintained by Shropshire Council. It is located in its original buildings which were completed in 1871, along with an extension built in 2003 to house the Goslings Nursery class, and an extension to the offices in 2006. The School's last inspection by Ofsted identified them as good (Grade 2) in most criteria, meaning "These are very positive features of a school. A school that is good is serving its pupils well".

Secondary School

The nearest secondary school to the village is The Grove in Market Drayton which is 4 miles (6 km) away.

== Demographics ==
Population of Moreton Say, 1801–2001

=== Population ===
At the time of the first census in 1801 the population of the village was 683, the population reached its peak of 858 in the year of 1901, ever since it has been declining to 429 in 2001. With the lack of employment in the village itself many people moved to towns and cities, such as Market Drayton.

=== Industry ===
Generally in the village a majority of the population has been employed in agriculture, at present this is still a sector where a lot of people work in as well as the service sector, although with no shops or businesses in the village around half the working population commutes outside of the village to their place of work.

== Transport ==
By road, the village itself is on an unnamed road, the nearest main road is the A41 which is less than 1 mile (2 km) from the centre of the village, and the next closest is the A53, which is the road which connects the village to, Market Drayton, the nearest town 3 miles (5 km) away.

There is at present no public transport regularly to or from the village.

== Climate ==
Climate data for Moreton Say, Shropshire, England
Month	Jan	Feb	Mar	Apr	May	Jun	Jul	Aug	Sep	Oct	Nov	Dec	Year
Mean daily maximum °C (°F)	7 (45)	7 (45)	10 (50)	12 (54)	16 (61)	19 (66)	21 (70)	21 (70)	18 (64)	14 (57)	10 (50)	7 (45)	14 (56)
Mean daily minimum °C (°F)	0 (32)	0 (32)	1 (34)	2 (36)	5 (41)	8 (46)	10 (50)	10 (50)	7 (45)	4 (39)	2 (36)	1 (34)	4 (40)
Average precipitation cm (inches)	5.48 (2.16)	4.11 (1.62)	4.53 (1.78)	4.63 (1.82)	5.42 (2.13)	5.43 (2.14)	5.18 (2.04)	5.69 (2.24)	5.88 (2.31)	6.18 (2.43)	6.08 (2.39)	6.10 (2.40)	64.71 (25.46)
Source: www.bing.com

== See also ==
- Listed buildings in Moreton Say
