= John Pemberton Heywood =

English banker

John Pemberton Heywood (1803–1877) was a banker from Liverpool, England, who was High Sheriff of Lancashire in 1855.

== Life ==
He was the second son of John Pemberton Heywood the elder of Wakefield, and his wife Margaret Drinkwater, and grandson of Arthur Heywood (1715–1795). He became a banker in Liverpool.

Initially a Unitarian and a member of the congregation at Renshaw Street Chapel, Heywood was the largest financial donor to the construction of Hope Street Unitarian Chapel before changing his religious affiliation to the Church of England. Thereafter, he and his wife paid for the crossing tower designed by George Gilbert Scott at St Mary's Church in the village of West Derby. His other financial contributions to public architecture include a William Eden Nesfield-designed cross and some charity cottages, also in West Derby.

Heywood, who was a "lifelong and active" Liberal in politics, was a friend of the Earl of Sefton and lived for some time at Norris Green, which bordered on the earl's Croxteth estate. Cloverley Hall, a mansion house in Shropshire, was built for him by Nesfield between 1864 and 1870. (Note: Cloverley Hall still exists and is a Grade II* listed building. It was partly demolished and rebuilt in 1926-1927.)

In 1855, Heywood served as High Sheriff of Lancashire.

Heywood was uncle to Henry Bright and to Arthur Pemberton Lonsdale. Upon his death in 1877, Lonsdale inherited £1.25 million of Heywood's £1.9 million estate.
