= Listed buildings in Ightfield =

Ightfield is a civil parish in Shropshire, England. It contains 16 listed buildings that are recorded in the National Heritage List for England. Of these, three are at Grade II*, the middle of the three grades, and the others are at Grade II, the lowest grade. The parish contains the villages of Ightfield and Calverhall, and is otherwise mainly rural. The largest building in the parish is Cloverley Hall, which is listed, together with structures in its grounds. The other listed buildings are two churches, a lychgate, farmhouses and farm buildings, and a row of almshouses.

== Key ==
Grade	Criteria
II*	Particularly important buildings of more than special interest
II	Buildings of national importance and special interest

== Buildings ==
Name and location	Photograph	Date	Notes	Grade
St John's Church, Ightfield; 52.94388°N 2.60788°W		Late 15th century	The church was restored and partly rebuilt in 1865. It is in sandstone with tile roofs, and is in Perpendicular style. The church consists of a nave, a north aisle, a south porch, a chancel, and a west tower. The tower has three stages, diagonal buttresses, a half-octagonal stair turret with a pyramidal cap and finial, a clock face on the south side, a quatrefoil frieze, corner gargoyles, and an embattled parapet with crocketed corner pinnacles. Along the sides of the church are battlements and crocketed pinnacles.	II*
Barn southeast of Ightfield Hall; 52.95011°N 2.59629°W	—	Mid 17th century	The barn is timber framed with red brick infill on a brick plinth, it is partly rebuilt in red brick and has a tile roof. There is one storey and a loft, six bays, five loft openings, and seven doors.	II
The Gables; 52.94124°N 2.60608°W	—	Mid 17th century	A farmhouse that was altered and extended in the 19th century, it is timber framed with brick infill, with rebuilding and extensions in brick and with a tile roof. It has one storey and an attic, and a T-shaped plan, consisting of a two-bay hall range, a projecting three-bay cross-wing, and a 19th-century two-storey rear wing. There is a jettied gable with a moulded bressumer, the windows are casements, and there are gabled eaves dormers. The rear wing has external stone steps leading up to a loft door.	II
Ightfield Hall; 52.95035°N 2.59716°W	—	Late 17th century (probable)	The farmhouse, which is on a moated site, was altered and extended in the 19th century. It is in red brick, and has a beaded wooden fascia, and a tile roof with sandstone copings and parapeted gables. There are two storeys and an attic and a T-shaped plan, with a main block of three bays and a rear wing. On the front is a timber framed gabled porch and a doorway with a rectangular fanlight. The windows are sashes, and there are three hipped eaves dormers.	II
Former stable southwest of Ightfield Hall; 52.95033°N 2.59755°W	—	Late 17th or 18th century (probable)	The former stable, which is on a moated site, is timber framed with red brick infill on a brick plinth, and has a slate roof. There is one storey and a loft, and two bays. The openings include doorways window, a loft door, and dovecote holes.	II
1–6 Church Terrace; 52.93093°N 2.59164°W	—	Mid 18th century	A row of almshouses in red brick with tile roofs, and with one storey and attics. The main range has twelve bays, and there is a projecting wing on the right that has a plinth, a basement, and coped gables. There is a gable above the middle four bays, and gabled dormers in the other bays. The other windows are cross-windows, and there are projecting flat-roofed porches. In the centre are carved and inscribed granite plaques.	II
Holy Trinity Church, Calverhall; 52.93106°N 2.59174°W		1843	In 1872 the chancel, transepts and north chapel were largely rebuilt in Decorated style by William Eden Nesfield, and in 1878 Nesfield rebuilt the nave, north aisle and northwest tower in Perpendicular style. The church is constructed in Grinshill sandstone. The tower has three stages, diagonal buttresses, a north portal with a pointed arch, an embattled parapet, and gargoyle spouts at the corners.	II*
Cloverley Hall and stable yards 52.92978°N 2.57381°W		1864–70	A country house designed by William Eden Nesfield in Gothic Revival style, it was partly demolished and rebuilt as a smaller house in 1926–27. The house is built in red brick with some diapering in blue brick and sandstone dressings. There is some slate hanging and the roofs are slated. The house has an L-shaped plan, and there is a service range and stable block to the southwest. The house is partly in two storeys and partly in one storey with attics. In the centre of the entrance front of the house is a four-stage clock tower and gatehouse with carriage entrance and a wooden gabled belfry. Most of the windows are mullioned and transomed, and there are half-dormers. Other features include gables with finials.	II*
Cloverley Lodge, gates and gate piers 52.92848°N 2.58587°W		1868–70	The lodge at the main entrance to the drive of Cloverley Hall was designed by William Eden Nesfield. It is in red brick on a chamfered plinth, with dressings in Grinshill sandstone and a slate roof with parapeted and coped gables, globe finials and tile cresting. There is one storey and an attic, and the windows are mullioned and transomed. On the front facing the road is a wide gabled bay containing a two-storey oriel window. The front facing the drive has a wide gabled bay containing the doorway that has a chamfered arch, and elsewhere are canted bay windows. To the left and flanking the drive and the pedestrian entrance are stone gate piers, each with red brick ribs, carved panels, a moulded cornice, and a pyramidal cap with a trumpet finial. The gates are in wrought iron.	II
The Lodge, gate and gate piers 52.93534°N 2.56867°W	—	c. 1868–70	The lodge at the north entrance to the dive of Cloverley Hall was designed by William Eden Nesfield. It is in red brick on a chamfered plinth, with slate-hung gables and a slate roof. There is one storey and an attic, and a T-shaped plan consisting of a main range and a gabled cross-wing. In the cross-wing is a canted bay window with a hipped roof. To the right is a doorway in a porch formed by overhanging eaves on wooden posts. To the left of the lodge are gate piers flanking the drive, a low wall and a smaller end pier. Each pier has a moulded plinth and cornice and a pyramidal cap with a trumpet finial. The gate is wooden.	II
Boat house, Cloverley Hall; 52.92819°N 2.57036°W	—	c. 1870	The boat house is by the lake in the grounds of the hall, and was designed by William Eden Nesfield. It is timber framed on a brick plinth with matchboarding and a slate roof, and the gables have pierced scalloped bargeboards and finials with pendants. At the east end are two elliptical-arched openings, and at the west end is a doorway.	II
Forecourt walls and gate piers, Cloverley Hall; 52.92955°N 2.57439°W	—	c. 1870	The walls and gate piers were designed by William Eden Nesfield. The walls are in red brick with grey sandstone dressings on a double-chamfered plinth, they have chamfered coping, and form a rough L-shaped plan. Most of the piers are in brick on chamfered plinths, and have pyramidal caps with trumpet finials. There is a pair of larger piers that with more elaborate decoration including pineapple finials, and there is a wrought iron gateway.	II
Sundial, Cloverley Hall; 52.92912°N 2.57399°W	—	1872	The sundial in the grounds of the hall is in Portland stone, it stands on three steps, and has an octagonal plan. It has a plinth with a moulded top, a circular stem with four floral panels divided by pilaster strips, and a moulded top. On the top is an inscribed and decorated copper dial and a gnomon incorporating a bird.	II
Pool House; 52.92343°N 2.57579°W	—	1872	A farmhouse, later a private house, it is timber framed with plaster infill on a red brick plinth, and has a tile roof, hipped to the northwest, with globe finials. There is one storey and an attic, and an irregular T-shaped plan. In an angle is a lean-to porch with a polygonal opening and benches inside. Most of the windows are mullioned and transomed, and other features include jettied gables with moulded bressumers, a square bay window, and eaves dormers.	II
Lychgate and churchyard wall, Holy Trinity Church; 52.93108°N 2.59201°W	—	c. 1878	The lychgate at the entrance to the churchyard was designed by William Eden Nesfield. It has sandstone walls with a timber superstructure and a hipped tile roof. Along the sides is wooden balustrading, and the gates are wooden. Inside are three steps and an inscribed copper plate. The churchyard wall is also in sandstone, and has chamfered and moulded coping.	II
