= Adderley Hall =

Former British historic country house

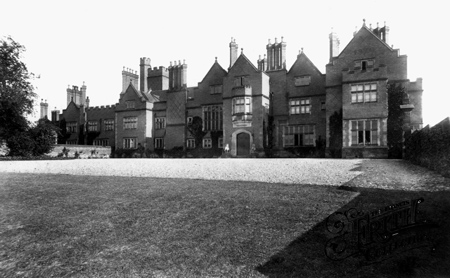

- Location within Shropshire

General information
- Location: Adderley, Shropshire, England
- Coordinates: 52.96°N 2.5°W
- Demolished: 1955

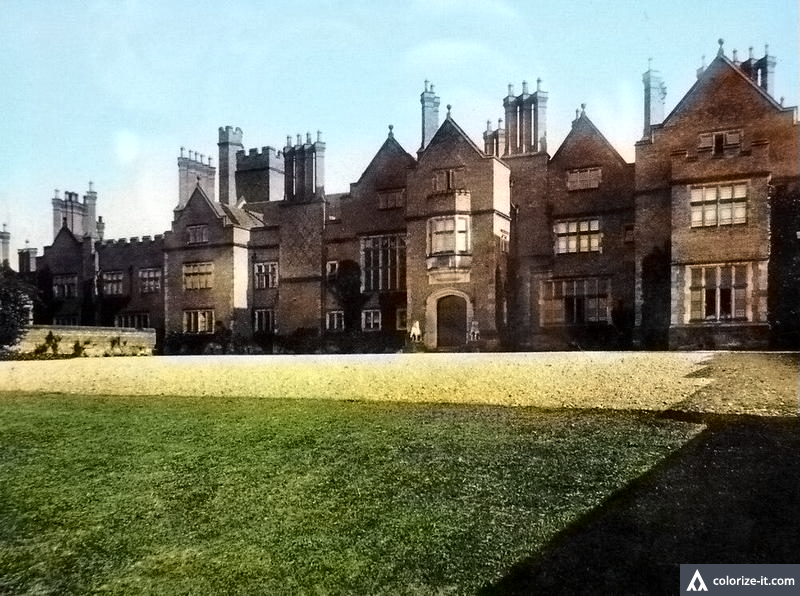
Adderley Hall – Colourised version of black and white image above.

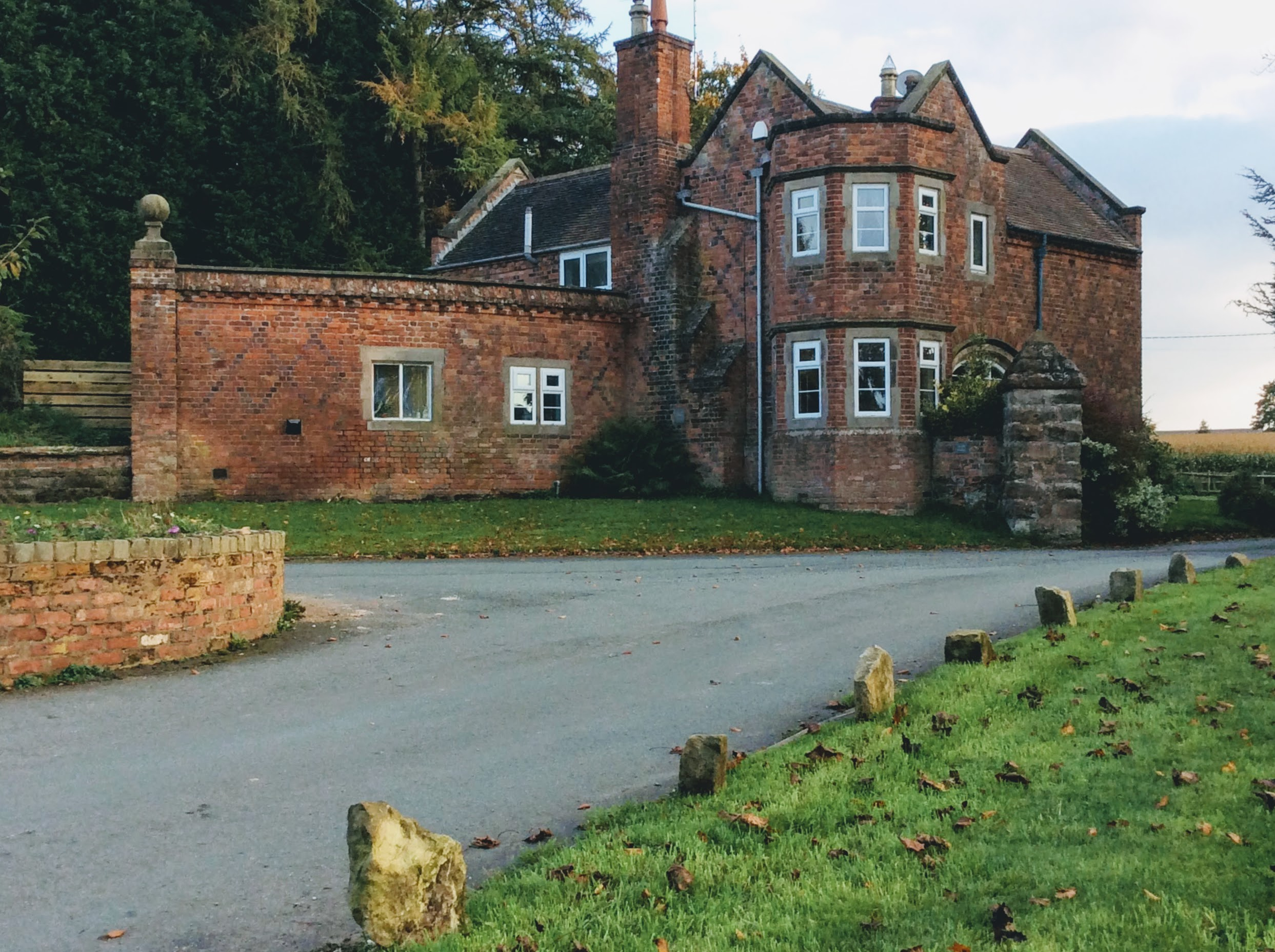
North Lodge – Also designed by George Devey, showing actual colour of brickwork of Adderley Hall.

Adderley Hall was a historic country house in Adderley, near Market Drayton in Shropshire, England. The first house was burned down and a new Victorian house was built and completed in 1879. It was demolished in 1955.

The estate grounds now consist of largely arable farming, the North and South Lodges remaining the only tangible links with the demolished house.

== George Devey ==
The Shropshire Archives holds a collection of materials on the building of the 'new' hall by Henry Reginald Corbet, who invited the architect, George Devey, 'to inspect the old house of Adderley to make it habitable'. Devey concluded that little could be done on account of its condition and outlook, recommending it be pulled down and a new hall placed on an elevated position to the northwest. The architect produced plans that were not to his clients' satisfaction and following discussions, led by Mrs Corbet, a new design agreed.

Four months following the inspection, in May 1877, the demolition of the old hall commenced with the digging of the cellars of the new. The materials from the demolition were used in the construction of the approved designs. The Victorian building was made from red bricks – mostly made locally at works "in the hole between the pool and the Church". Windows and coping stones carved from stone were made from the portico columns that formed the entrance of the former building – this stone being of higher quality than the stone purchased from the quarry.

== Completion, demise and demolition ==
The first bricks were laid on the 29th of August of 1877 and a year later much progress had been made. The building employed wood and lath and plaster partitions upon which the roof was supported. Some sources indicate that rotten flooring led to the demise of the property, leading to its demolition some 60 years later – it could be assumed that using the wooden partition to hold up the weight of the grand tiled roof may have led to structural issues if rot was indeed a factor in the decision to demolish in 1955.

The site cannot be accessed from the public highway and the transfer of the land from the Corbet family was in 1958.
