= Joseph Bromfield =

English tradesman come architect

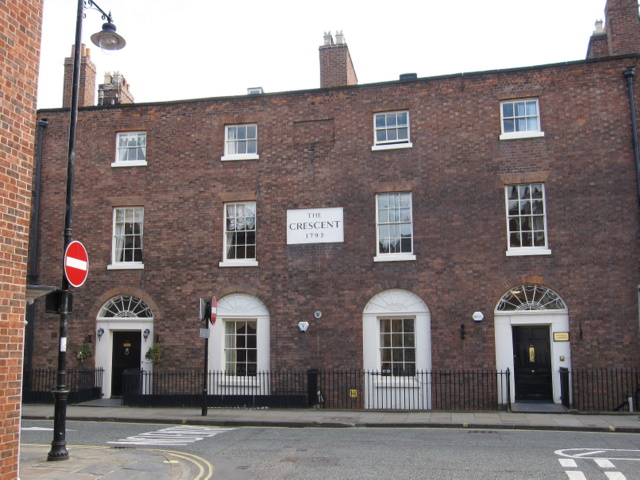
- The Crescent, Shrewsbury, built by Bromfield in 1793
- Born: 1744 ?Whitchurch, Shropshire, England
- Died: 1824 (aged 79–80); Shrewsbury, Shropshire, England
- Occupation: Architect
- Buildings: Glansevern, Rhug, Plas Bodegroes, Nanhoron

Joseph Bromfield (1744–1824) was a notable English plasterer and architect working in the West Midlands and in Central and Northern Wales in the late Georgian period. He was Mayor of Shrewsbury in 1809.

== Early career ==
He was born, probably in Whitchurch, Shropshire, in 1744. His father, Robert Bromfield, was a builder. By 1752 the family had moved to Old Swinford in Worcestershire, where his father had become the clerk to the works at Hagley Hall. Joseph Bromfield was one of four brothers – the other three were also involved in the building trades, the youngest being Benjamin Bromfield, who became a sculptor, designer and manufacturer of marble fireplaces which he supplied to stately homes including Chirk Castle in Denbighshire. The father, Robert Bromfield, appears to have been associated with the Shrewsbury architect Thomas Farnolls Pritchard whose most important work was the designs for the Iron Bridge at Ironbridge. Through this connection his son Joseph started to undertake plasterwork commissions for Farnolls Pritchard.

== Public life ==
Bromfield served as Mayor of Shrewsbury for 1809–1810.

== Architect ==
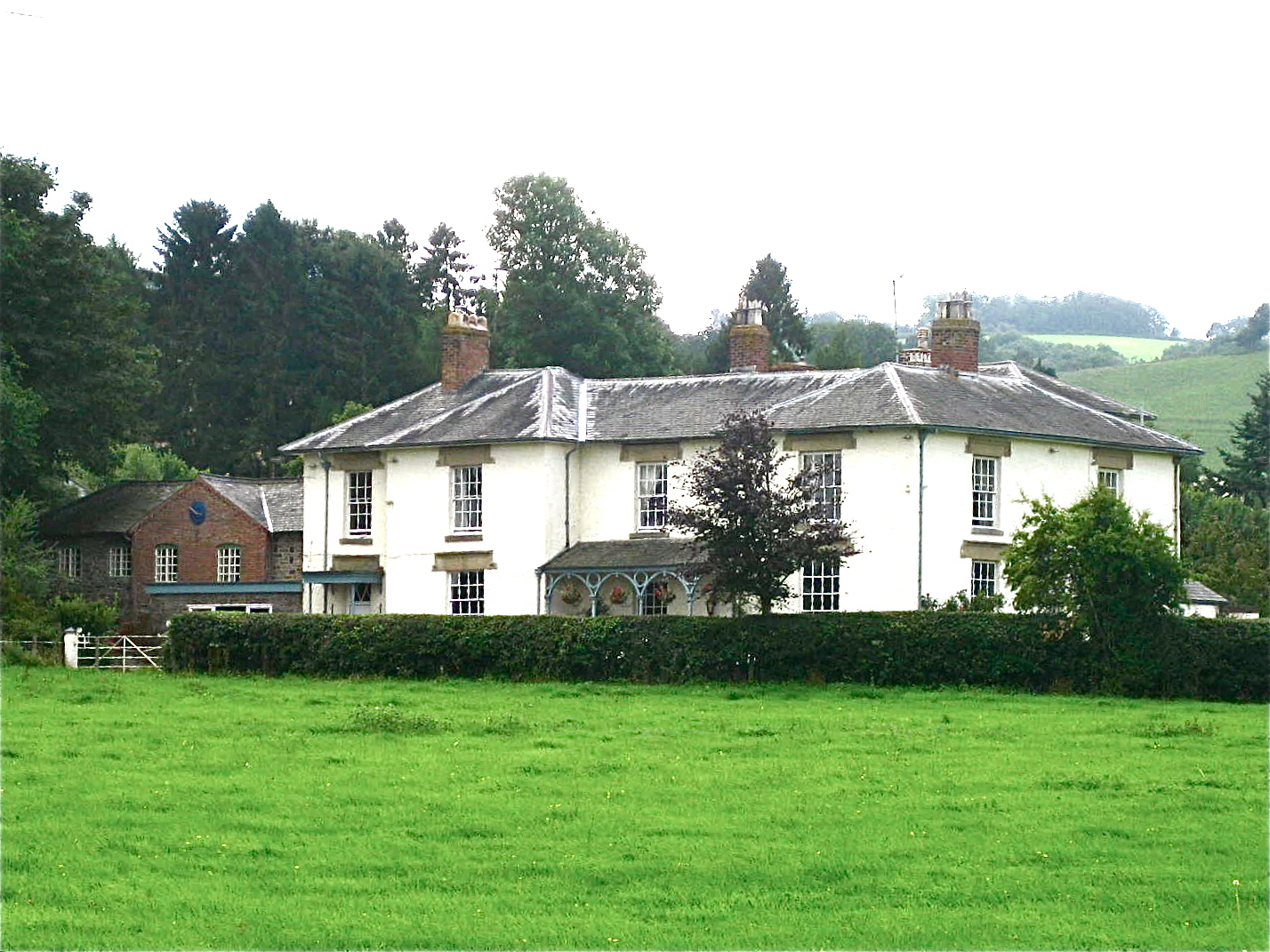
The Old Rectory, Llandyssil

In 1777 when Farnolls Pritchard died, Bromfield, a talented draughtsman, appears to have decided to work as an architect and to take over Farnolls Pritchard's architectural practice. Initially he worked in Shropshire, but his architectural practice gradually spread to cover most of North and Central Wales. He owned a property, Brannas Lodge on the river Dee, near Bala in Merionethshire, from where he seems to have practised. He now undertook some commissions for fairly major country houses, such as Rhug, Caerynwch and Nanhoron; rectories, including Newtown and Llandyssil in Montgomeryshire, and the workhouses at Morda outside Oswestry and Forden near Montgomery. His work is typified by the use of large bay windows and the use of “wrap-round” or half “wrap-round” verandas. He was influenced by the villa designs in Italianate style that was developed by John Nash, who had designed Cronkhill close to Attingham Park in 1805. Bromfield was also responsible for Berrington Rectory (later Berrington Hall) in the next parish to Cronkhill, as well as working at Attingham. Many Bromfield houses have typical low sloping Regency roofs with wide eaves. Bromfield was a pioneer of the early use of cast ironwork in domestic buildings, probably sourced from William Hazeldine's foundries in Coleham, Shrewsbury and Plas Kynaston near the Pontcysyllte aqueduct at Chirk. Examples of this ironwork can be seen at Plas Bodegroes on the Llyn Peninsula where the cast iron downspouts and hopper heads are dated 1779, and the Rectory at Llandyssil which has similar downspouts but also cast iron stanchions used to support the veranda, which are similar to those used in early factory construction.

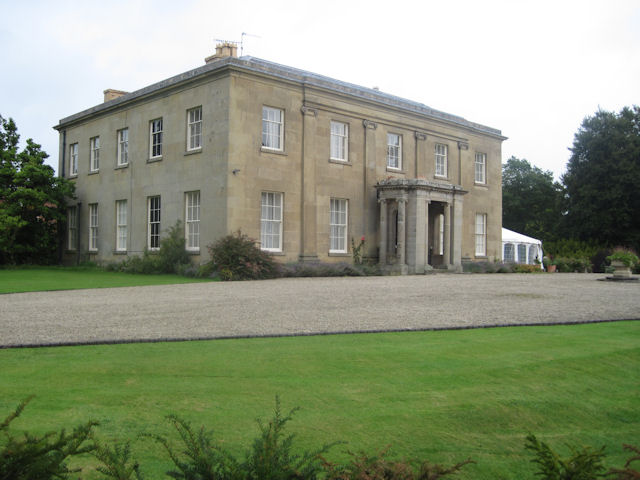
Glansevern hall, Berriew, Montgomeryshire

The most interesting house by Bromfield is Glansevern Hall, between Welshpool and Newtown, which was completed for Sir Arthur Davies Owen in 1807. This house in the Greek Revival style and the stone from which it was built came from the Cefn quarries in Minera near Wrexham. The use of the Greek Revival style is comparatively rare and Pevsner and Lang point out that the earliest example of it is James "Athenian" Stuart's Doric temple at Hagley Park. As Joseph Bromfield's father was the clerk of the works at Hagley, he may have got the idea from this, or alternatively he may have been aware of the work of Thomas Harrison of Chester, who was a major exponent of this style. For the lodge at Brannas Bromfield used 'Gothic' rounded arch windows, apparently copying Farnolls Pritchard, who was very fond of using Gothic and Chinoiserie styles in his architecture. The alterations to Brynkinallt, Denbighshire in 1806 show that Bromfield could also work in the castellated Gothic style.

Until recently Joseph Bromfield was largely unrecognised as an architect. Howard Colvin's first edition of the Biographical Dictionary of British Architects failed to make any mention of his work, while the third edition published in 1995 observes that Bromfield "As an architect he appears to have been competent but unremarkable". Noticeably the 4th edition (2008), which lists more examples of his work, omits this remark.

== Works ==
This is a list of work by Joseph Bromfield

=== Plasterwork ===
- Hartlebury Castle Plasterwork in Bishop Hurd's Library.
- Ruabon Church. Plasterwork in 1770-1
- Wynnstay. Plasterwork in 1770-1
- Powis Castle Plasterwork in the Ballroom 1774-7
- St Alkmund, Shrewsbury
- St Chad, Shrewsbury
- Oakley Park

4 Quarry Place Shrewsbury.

=== Architecture ===
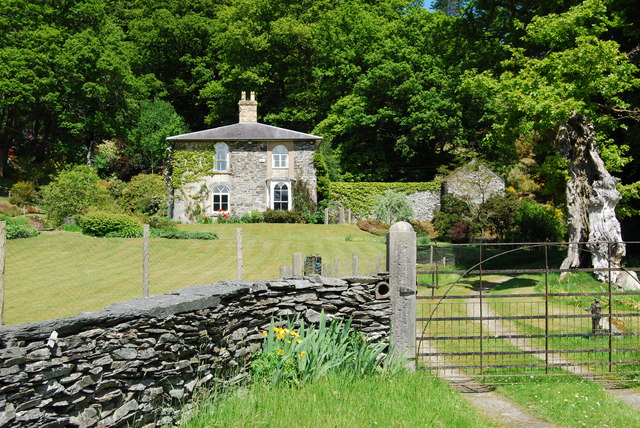
Brannas Lodge, Llandrillo. Joseph Bromfield's House near Cowen

- Nanhoron, Llyn Peninsula. Designed for Col Richard Edwards 1797.
- Broomhall, Llyn Peninsula
- Plas Bodegroes, Llyn Peninsula 1789
- Caerynwch, Brithdir, Merioneth. For Sir Richard Richards
- Brannas Lodge, Llandrillo (attributed)
- Nannau, Llanfachreth (the demolished wing was certainly his work (1806), while the house is attributed)
- Glanllyn, Llyn Peninsula (attrib).
- Rhug. For Col Edward Vaughan Salisbury (1802–05)
- Rhagatt (attributed).

=== Montgomeryshire ===
- Newtown Rectory 1812.
- Llandyssil Rectory for the Rev Devereux Mytton 1812–1814.
- Glansevern, Berriew. Grecian revival style house and gatelodge for Sir Arthur Davies Owen (1803–07)
- Rhiwport, Berriew (attributed-typical veranda)
- St Nicholas, Churchstoke, alterations to Church tower 1814–15
- Forden Workhouse (1794–95)

=== Denbighshire ===
- Brynkinallt, Chirk, near Ruabon. Re-designed the exterior of the house for 2nd Viscount Dungannon, with gothic castellated turrets in 1806, which have now been removed. The gothic castellated park gateway may also be ascribed to him.
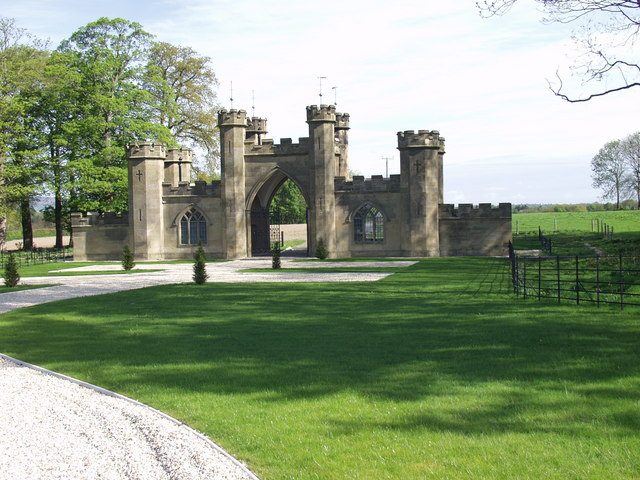
  Gatehouse to Brynkinallt. Probably the work of Joseph Bromfield in 1806.

=== Shropshire ===
- Morda Workhouse, Oswestry.
- Styche Hall (1796–98). Alterations.
- Apley Castle for St John Charlton. (1791–94). Demolished 1955.
- Attingham Park Lodges (1796–99)
- Church Aston Church c. 1800
- Berrington Rectory (later Berrington Hall) (1805)
- Acton Scott Hall. Remodelled for Thomas Stackhouse Acton (c. 1810–20).
- Walcot Hall-Redesign of facade and portico 1784–90 for 2nd Lord Clive.
- Sham Castle (attributed)
- The Crescent, Shrewsbury. 1793
- 37 St Julians Friars, Shrewsbury. Bromfield's Shrewsbury townhouse with fine plasterwork. Now Darwin's Townhouse boutique Bed and Breakfast (formerly Sandford House Hotel)

== Literature ==
- Colvin H. (2008) A Biographical Dictionary of British Architects 1600–1840. Yale University Press, 4th edition London, 163–164.
- Ionides J. (1999) Thomas Farnolls Pritchard of Shrewsbury, Architect and ‘Inventor of Cast Iron Bridges. The Dog Rose Press, Ludlow.
- Moore N. (2002) Llandyssil Rectory: its architecture and building history. Montgomeryshire Collections 90, 99–108
- R Scourfield and R Haslam (2013) The Buildings of Wales: Powys; Montgomeryshire, Radnorshire and Breconshire Yale University Press .
