= Longford Hall, Shropshire =

Country house in Shropshire, England

Coordinates: 52°45′39.4″N 2°24′13.0″W

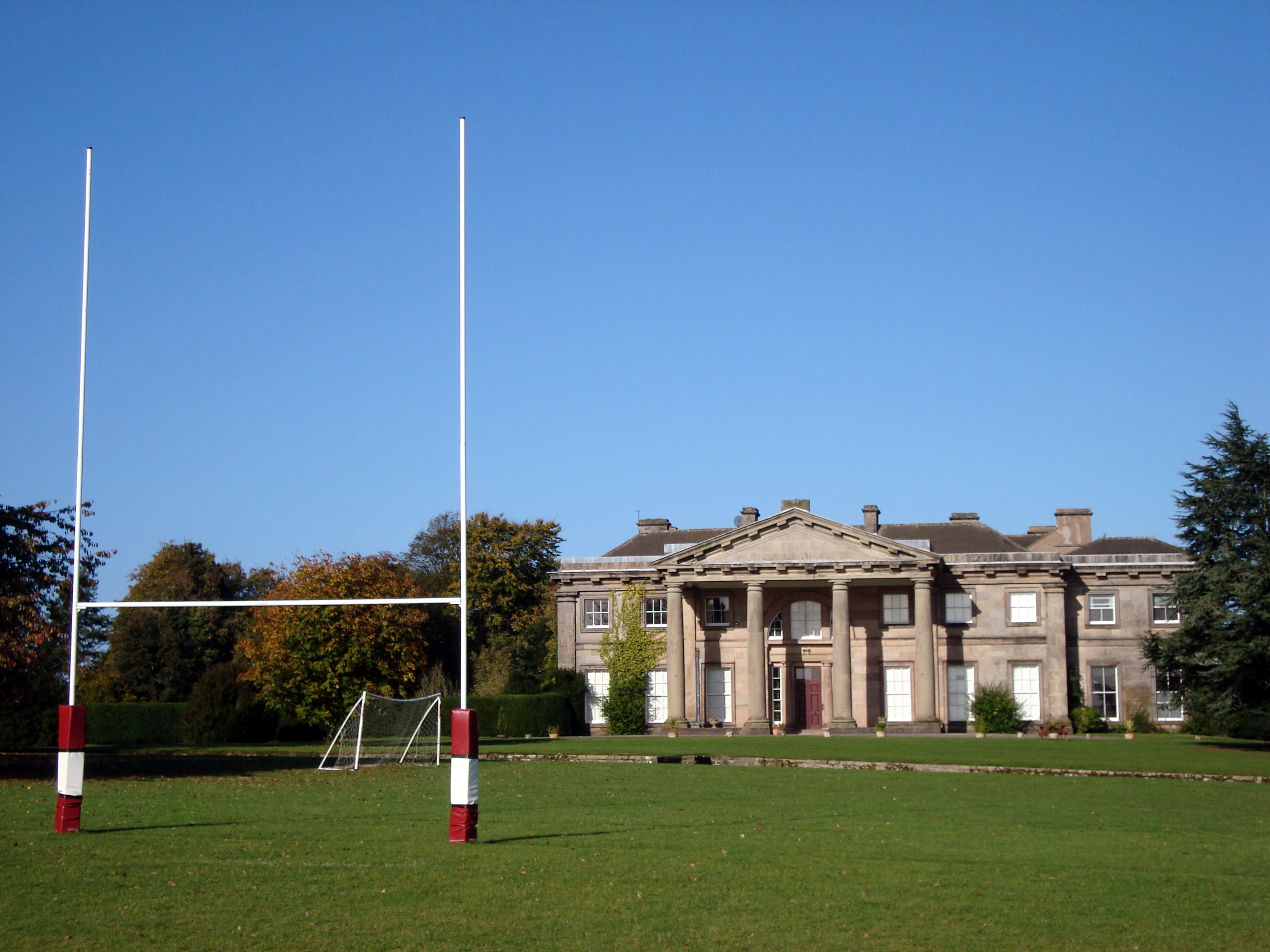
The school's Longford Hall junior boarding house as seen from the 1st XV Rugby pitch

Longford Hall is a large country house in Longford, a village in Shropshire, England near the town of Newport.

== Building history ==
Longford Hall was built in 1275 by Adam de Brompton and owned by the Talbot Earls of Shrewsbury. In April 1644 it was captured by Royalists and subsequently demolished. The present house was built on the site 1794–97 by Colonel Ralph Leeke and designed by Joseph Bonomi. Leeke was a political agent of the British East India Company, the architect had worked with Robert and James Adam. The hall is Grade II* listed with English Heritage.

The hall is placed on top of a low rise and looks over farmland towards the Lilleshall Monument which is surrounded by burials. As with many such buildings, the first 100 feet in front of the hall are manicured grass, bordered by a ha-ha which prevented animals from entering. There is a small series of gardens, including a "quad". Behind the hall are a selection of buildings around a central square containing a dovecote which once formed the farm supporting the estate. These buildings were renovated and sensitively converted into housing between 2001 and 2004. The central dovecote is circular and forms an unusual dwelling.

The hall and lands are currently owned by Haberdashers’ Adams School and are used by them as the school's junior boarding house and sports fields. Some land was sold off in 2000 for private housing – now the "Longford Park" housing estate. To get between the school and the hall, one travels approximately one mile along Longford Road.

== Longford Lake ==
Across the playing fields, approximately 500 metres, is the Longford Lake. This large artificial pool is used for private fishing by the school and holds a wide variety of fish, including carp.

== Notable private residents ==
The 1st Marquess of Abergavenny (1826–1915), whose mother Caroline was a daughter of Ralph Leeke, was born here.

The mansion was rented from 1894 by businessman and Conservative politician Edward Brocklehurst Fielden (1857–1942) before he bought and moved to Condover Hall.

== Boarding Masters ==
Boarding House Masters at Longford Hall have included:

- Mr R. H. Anderson (1967–1971)
- Mr Oliver G. Atkinson (1971 – died at the Hall 1979 after an illness)
- Dr David Westgate (1979–)
- Mr Rodney Jones (1970–1988)
- Mr Gerald Leach (1988–1991)
- Mr George Mayne (1991–1994)
- Mr Philip North (1994–2001)
- Mr Lee Hadley (2001–2007)
- Mr Matthew Skeate (2007–2016)
- Mr Samuel Obeng-Asare (2016–2023)
- Mr Daniel Murray (2023-)

== Matrons ==
- Mrs Atkinson (? – circa 1982)
- Mrs Anderson
- Mrs Fowler
- Mrs Vernon
- Mrs Peters
- Miss Davies
- Miss Clare Pickering 2000–2014
- Mrs Allday (2014– current)

== See also ==
- Grade II* listed buildings in Telford and Wrekin
- Listed buildings in Church Aston
