= Listed buildings in Church Aston =

Church Aston is a civil parish in the district of Telford and Wrekin, Shropshire, England. It contains 22 listed buildings that are recorded in the National Heritage List for England. Of these, three are listed at Grade II*, the middle of the three grades, and the others are at Grade II, the lowest grade. The parish contains the villages of Church Aston and Longford, part of Cheswell, and the surrounding countryside. At Longford, the main building is Longford Hall, a country house which is listed, together with a number of associated structures. Also in this village is a church and the surviving chancel of another church, both of which are listed. Elsewhere most of the listed buildings are houses, cottages, and farm buildings, some of which are timber framed and date from the 17th century, and there is another listed church in Church Aston.

== Key ==
Grade	Criteria
II*	Particularly important buildings of more than special interest
II	Buildings of national importance and special interest

== Buildings ==
Name and location	Photograph	Date	Notes	Grade
Talbot Chapel; 52.76295°N 2.40753°W		Late 13th century	This is the surviving chancel of a church, the rest of it having been demolished, and the chancel then used as a mortuary chapel. It is in sandstone with a tiled roof. At the east end are five lancet windows under an arch, at the west end is a double-chamfered arched doorway, there are two lancets in the north wall, and a blocked arch on the south side. Inside is a large monument to members of the Talbot family.	II*
39 Wellington Road; 52.75705°N 2.38642°W		17th century	A timber framed cottage with a brick front and a thatched roof. It has one storey and an attic. On the front is a casement window, with a door to the right, and the attic window is in the right gable.	II
Barn east of Brockton House; 52.74776°N 2.40385°W	—	17th century	The barn is timber framed with red brick infill on a brick plinth, and has a tile roof. It was extended to the south in the 18th century including crowstepped gables. The barn contains two cart entrances, one blocked.	II
Dog Bank; 52.76013°N 2.38314°W	—	17th century	A timber framed cottage with brick infill and a tile roof. It has one storey and an attic, two bays, and a timber framed rear wing. In the centre is a doorway with a hood, flanked by casement windows, and there are two gabled dormers.	II
Barn, Longford Hall; 52.76214°N 2.40518°W	—	Late 17th century	The barn is in red brick with a string course, dentil eaves, and a tile roof with parapet gable ends. At the centre is a large cart entrance. (Note: Street View in July 2011 shows that the barn has been converted into residential use.)	II
Former stables, Longford Hall; 52.76198°N 2.40451°W	—	Late 17th century	The stables, which have been converted into housing, are in red brick on a sandstone plinth, and have string courses, diagonally-set dentils, and a tiled roof. There are two storeys and six bays. In the centre is an arched doorway, there are two other doorways with chamfered sandstone jambs, segmental arches and corbelled keystones. The windows are casements with segmental heads, and on the front and end walls are sundials dated 1680.	II
Small stables, Longford Hall; 52.76199°N 2.40492°W	—	Late 17th century	The stables are in red brick on a sandstone plinth and have a tile roof. They contain stable doors, a window, and ventilation holes, and in the gable end is a loft door. Large modern doors have been inserted at the rear.	II
19 and 20 Wellington Road; 52.75559°N 2.38910°W		Late 17th to early 18th century	A pair of stone cottages with a brick extension to the right and a thatched roof. They have one storey and attics, and three bays. The windows are casements, and there are three eyebrow dormers.	II
38 Wellington Road; 52.75688°N 2.38662°W		Late 17th to early 18th century (probable)	A small brick cottage with a thatched roof. It has one storey and an attic, one bay, a lean-to on the right, and a large chimney stack protruding on the left. In the ground floor is a doorway and a casement window, and above is an eyebrow dormer.	II
Farm buildings, Longford Grange; 52.74839°N 2.40264°W	—	17th to 18th century	The farm buildings consist of a timber framed barn with red brick infill and a slate roof. To the east is an 18th-century brick stable with a dentil eaves course and a tile roof. On the ridge is a weatherboarded lantern with a weathervane.	II
Cheswell Manor House; 52.75121°N 2.42205°W	—	18th century	A red brick house with dentil eaves, and a tile roof with coped gable ends. There are two storeys and an attic, and five bays. The doorway has an architrave and a hood on brackets. The windows are mullioned and transomed with segmental heads, and there are four gabled dormers.	II
Church Aston Manor; 52.75607°N 2.38334°W	—	18th century	The house has an earlier core. It is in red brick with a moulded modillion cornice, a parapet, and a tile roof with stone coped gables. There are three storeys and a basement, and five bays. Steps with an iron balustrade lead up to a doorway with a moulded architrave and a cornice. The windows are sashes, and in the upper floor some windows have been blocked.	II*
Boundary wall, Longford Hall; 52.76246°N 2.40494°W	—	Late 18th century	The tall wall is in sandstone with pitched stone coping. At the west end are square gate piers with caps.	II
Dovecote, Longford Hall; 52.76223°N 2.40470°W	—	Late 18th century	The dovecote is in red brick on a sandstone plinth, with dentil eaves, an octagonal plan, and a hipped slate roof. On the roof is a cupola with an ogee cap, and on the sides are circular flight holes, some of which are blocked.	II
Lodge, Longford Hall; 52.76144°N 2.40350°W	—	Late 18th century	The lodge to the north of the hall is in sandstone with a tile roof, and is in Gothic style. It has a central ogee-arched doorway flanked by sash windows with pointed arches. In the gable above is blind quatrefoil panel flanked by crosses.	II
Longford Hall; 52.76092°N 2.40352°W		1789–94	A country house designed by Joseph Bonomi, later used as a school. It is in sandstone, with a hipped slate roof. There are two storeys, a front of seven bays with pilasters and an entablature, and sides of four bays. In the central three bays is a porte-cochère with a pediment on four Tuscan columns, behind which is a doorway with Tuscan columns and a Diocletian window above. The windows are sashes with moulded architraves. To the right is a recessed two-bay wing.	II*
Service wing, Longford Hall; 52.76120°N 2.40389°W	—	c. 1794–97	The detached service wing to the north of the hall, was designed by Joseph Bonomi. It is in red brick on a sandstone plinth, and has a hipped tiled roof. There are two storeys, five bays, central double doors with a fanlight, sash windows in the ground floor and casement windows above. In the centre of the roof is a stone clock tower with a pyramidal tiled roof and a weathervane, a moulded eaves cornice, and arched bell openings with continuous impost moulding. The wing has been converted for housing.	II
St Mary's Church; 52.76279°N 2.40752°W		1803–06	The church is in sandstone and has embattled parapets throughout. It consists of a nave, a chancel with a polygonal apse, and a west tower. The tower has a west doorway with a pointed arch, and pinnacles. The windows are lancets with Y-tracery.	II
Brockton Manor House; 52.74765°N 2.40453°W	—	Early 19th century	A red brick house with a dentil eaves course, and a tile roof with coped gable ends. There are three storeys and three bays. The windows are sashes with segmental heads, some of which have been replaced by casements. In the centre is a doorway with a semicircular fanlight and a broken pediment on consoles. The central range is flanked by single-storey gabled wings with a segmental-headed ground floor window and a lunette in an arched panel above.	II
Vauxhall House; 52.76594°N 2.38977°W	—	Early 19th century	A red brick house with a tile roof, three storeys and three bays. There is a central wooden trellis porch and a doorway with a rectangular fanlight. The windows are sashes with stone lintels.	II
Church Aston House; 52.75703°N 2.38325°W	—	Mid 19th century	A stuccoed house with a roughcast front, and a slate roof with overhanging moulded eaves. There are two storeys and three bays. In the centre is an open porch with a moulded cornice on brackets, and the doorway has a moulded architrave. The windows are sashes with segmental heads, the left window in the ground floor has a keyblock, and to the right of the door is a canted bay window. On the right is a canted wing with a modillion eaves cornice, a hipped roof, and a porch with three round arches.	II
St Andrew's Church; 52.75768°N 2.38186°W		1866–67	The church was designed by G. E. Street replacing an earlier church on the site. It is in sandstone with a tile roof, and consists of a nave and chancel in one cell, and a lean-to north aisle. On the nave is a polygonal lead flèche with gablets and finials. The windows in the aisle are lancets, and those in the nave have Geometric tracery.	II

== Notes and references ==
=== Sources ===
- Historic England, "Talbot Chapel, Church Aston (1037009)", National Heritage List for England
- Historic England, "No. 39 Wellington Road, Church Aston (1054127)", National Heritage List for England
- Historic England, "Barn east of Brockton House, Church Aston (1037013)", National Heritage List for England
- Historic England, "Dog Bank, Church Aston (1367404)", National Heritage List for England
- Historic England, "Barn approximately 150 yards north-north-west of Longford Hall, Church Aston (1037011)", National Heritage List for England
- Historic England, "Former stables approximately 130 yards north-north-west of Longford Hall, Church Aston (1351607)", National Heritage List for England
- Historic England, "Small stables immediately south of barn north-north-west of Longford Hall, Church Aston (1037012)", National Heritage List for England
- Historic England, "Nos. 19 and 20 Wellington Road, Church Aston (1054126)", National Heritage List for England
- Historic England, "No. 38 Wellington Road, Church Aston (1367403)", National Heritage List for England
- Historic England, "Range of farm buildings north of Longford Grange, Church Aston (1293063)", National Heritage List for England
- Historic England, "Cheswell Manor House, Church Aston (1351608)", National Heritage List for England
- Historic England, "Church Aston Manor, Church Aston (1367402)", National Heritage List for England
- Historic England, "Boundary wall on north side of former farmyard north-north-west of Longford Hall, Church Aston (1293051)", National Heritage List for England
- Historic England, "Dovecote approximately 150 yards north-north-west of Longford Hall, Church Aston (1208601)", National Heritage List for England
- Historic England, "Lodge immediately north of Longford Hall, Church Aston (1208581)", National Heritage List for England
- Historic England, "Longford Hall, Church Aston (1208541)", National Heritage List for England
- Historic England, "Service wing immediately north north-west of Longford Hall, Church Aston (1037010)", National Heritage List for England
- Historic England, "Church of St Mary, Church Aston (1293120)", National Heritage List for England
- Historic England, "Brockton Manor House, Church Aston (1293057)", National Heritage List for England
- Historic England, "Vauxhall House, Church Aston (1054125)", National Heritage List for England
- Historic England, "Church Aston House, Church Aston (1206128)", National Heritage List for England
- Historic England, "Church of St Andrew, Church Aston (1054124)", National Heritage List for England
- Historic England, Listed Buildings
- Newman, John; Pevsner, Nikolaus (2006), Shropshire, The Buildings of England, New Haven and London: Yale University Press, ISBN 0-300-12083-4
