= Cheswell, Shropshire =

Hamlet in Shropshire, England

Coordinates: 52.750°N 2.419°W

Cheswell
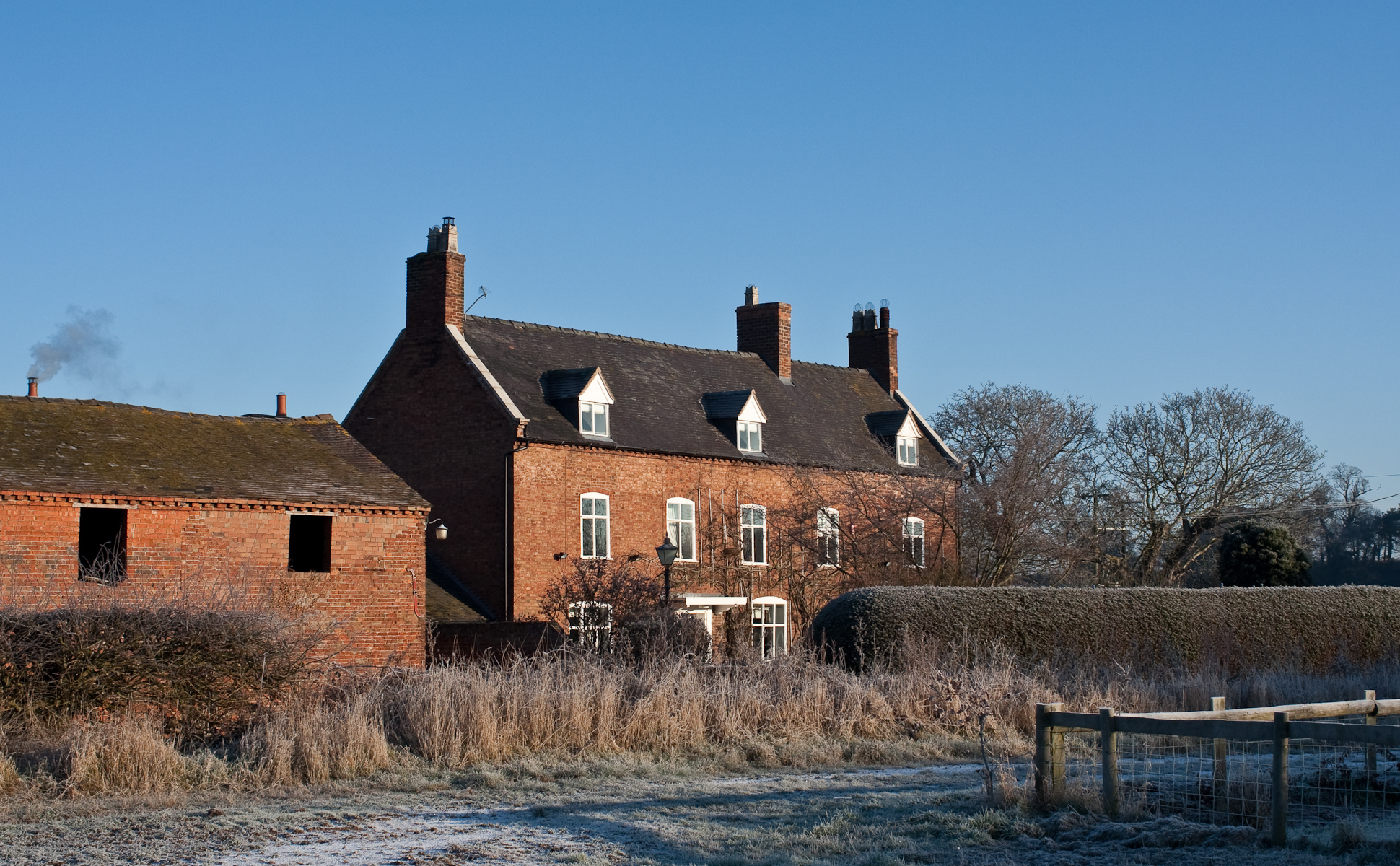
- Cheswell Manor

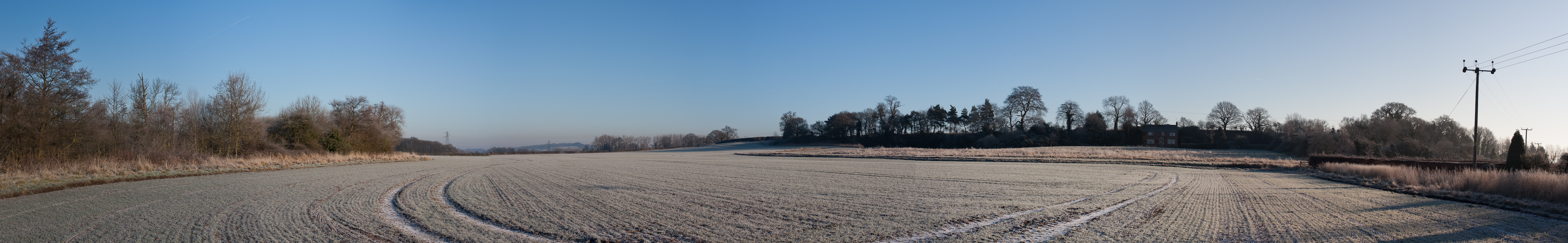
- View towards Cheswell Hill from the main settlement

- Location within Shropshire
- OS grid reference: SJ717170
- Civil parish: Church Aston
- Unitary authority: Telford and Wrekin
- Ceremonial county: Shropshire
- Region: West Midlands
- Country: England
- Sovereign state: United Kingdom
- Post town: NEWPORT
- Postcode district: TF10
- Dialling code: 01952
- Police: West Mercia
- Fire: Shropshire
- Ambulance: West Midlands
- UK Parliament: The Wrekin

Cheswell is a hamlet in Shropshire, England, on the edge of the Weald Moors.

The settlement is overlooked by a rocky, sandstone edge called Cheswell Hill, which gives the place its name. The old name - Chrestill - is thought to mean 'Christ's Hill' or 'the hill with a cross'.

There a number of substantial brick buildings, including the Manor, Grange and Lodge, surrounded by damp, reclaimed farmland.

== See also ==
- Listed buildings in Church Aston
