= Calverhall =

Village in Shropshire, England

Coordinates: 52.932°N 2.594°W

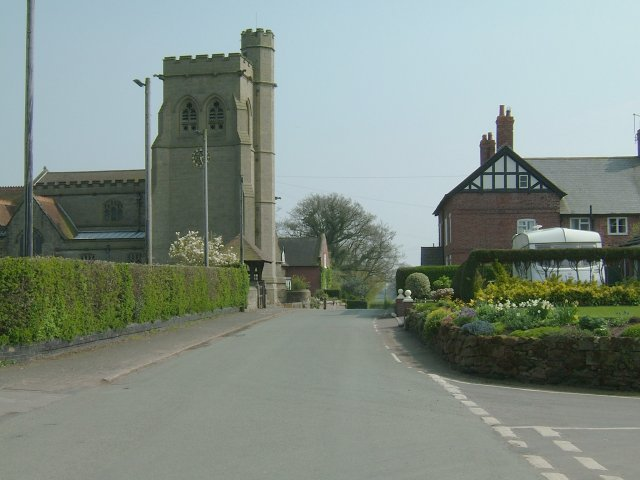
- Calverhall village

- Location within Shropshire
- OS grid reference: SJ600373
- Civil parish: Ightfield
- Unitary authority: Shropshire
- Ceremonial county: Shropshire
- Region: West Midlands
- Country: England
- Sovereign state: United Kingdom
- Post town: WHITCHURCH
- Postcode district: SY13
- Dialling code: 01948
- Police: West Mercia
- Fire: Shropshire
- Ambulance: West Midlands
- UK Parliament: North Shropshire

Calverhall is a small village in Shropshire, approximately 5 miles away from the town of Whitchurch. It lies within the civil parish of its neighbouring village of Ightfield which is one mile away.

== History ==
There is evidence that the village was occupied as far back as 1066 AD as there are large curving holloway (or trackway) with a series of raised house platforms on either side in surrounding fields but for reasons unknown, the site was abandoned. It is widely believed that the Black Death of 1350 could have been the cause but there is also the chance that the villagers were displaced by land owners so that the land could be used for livestock. There are two moated sites in Calverhall, one near Cloverly Hall and another in a field outside the village. These were common in the Medieval Period and upon them often sat manor houses of the wealthy. The moats served no defensive purpose but were instead a status symbol to display the owner's wealth

The village and surrounding would have once been owned by the Calverhall's, a noble family of Norman descent, but eventually this line of succession ended and ownership was acquired by the Heywood family. In 1319, Randulph de Calverhall married Margaret, daughter of Peter Pigot, of Willaston, County Salop "Then follow several generations of the de Calverhalls, among them Roger de Calverhall, until the male line as tenants of the manor of Calverhall became extinct, and the estate descended to Agnes de Calverhall, daughter and heiress, who married Hugh Dod, of Edge, whose family possessed Calverhall Manor until 1850." (J.M. Runk)

== Village life ==
Calverhall is the home of the renowned "Olde Jack Inn" public house/restaurant, named after a famed historical drinking vessel made of leather with a silver mounted inscribed band around the rim known as "the Jacorra" ("Corra" <core - ah> incidentally being an ancient name of the village). It was purported to be a challenge for any man to drink the full contents (just over a pint) of the Jacorra vessel in one go as quickly as possible but this was not as easy as it sounds due to the width of the vessel's rim only allowing a thin trickle to pour from it. Unfortunately the whereabouts of the fabled Jacorra are no longer known, and is believed to have disappeared without trace some 120 years ago.

The village has a long hunting history, it now lies within the Shropshire Hunt's country, though the Cheshire Fox Hounds notably hunted the Shavington estate and it once lay within Sir Watkin Williams Wynn's hunting country.

Calverhall has also recently won a countywide community award, naming it the best village in Shropshire. It won praise for its improvement in recent years, due largely to a number of schemes, especially the Millennium Pond which sits either side of the road as an entrance way into the village from the Prees Road. It also boasts active sports and social groups, including cricket, tennis, bowls and a snooker/pool/recreation club, a much used village hall which caters for everything from local W.I. meetings, youth club nights and even touring local theatre groups - in fact, all in all it has more than some much larger villages. It does not however have a shop/post office which was lost a number of years ago, and was until 2002 served by the facility in neighbouring Ightfield before it too closed down and was converted into a private house.

== Churches ==
Calverhall's church is the Church of England "Holy Trinity", which itself is part of a network of five local churches (Ash, Moreton Say, Ightfield, Calverhall, Adderley - abbreviated AMICA) which are within a 6-mile diameter of each other and are served mainly by the Reverend Michael Last who resides in the rectory of nearby Moreton Say. The Amica Centre, in Ightfield, is the central administrative hub and a community centre for the AMICA Benefice. The benefice website is located at AmicaCentre.co.uk.

The Holy Trinity Church that now stands at the centre of Calverhall is a fairly recent endeavour. The Calverhall or 'Corra' Chapel originally stood on the site next to the Alms houses and the new church was built in 1879 by Mrs Heywood, wife of John Pemberton Heywood, after her husband died in 1877

== Housing ==
Housing in Calverhall falls into 3 main groups. There are (former) council houses, many of which are now privately owned. Secondly there are the "Corra Meadows" houses, these all being privately owned and are also the newest houses in the village, the development being built in the early 1990s. Also there are the oldest "Estate" houses, Calverhall falling within the boundaries of the Shavington and Cloverly estate, owned by the Heywood-Lonsdale family. The estate office is the village and was for many years run by Timothy Heywood-Lonsdale (died 2014) before recently being passed onto his son, William.

== Cloverley Hall ==
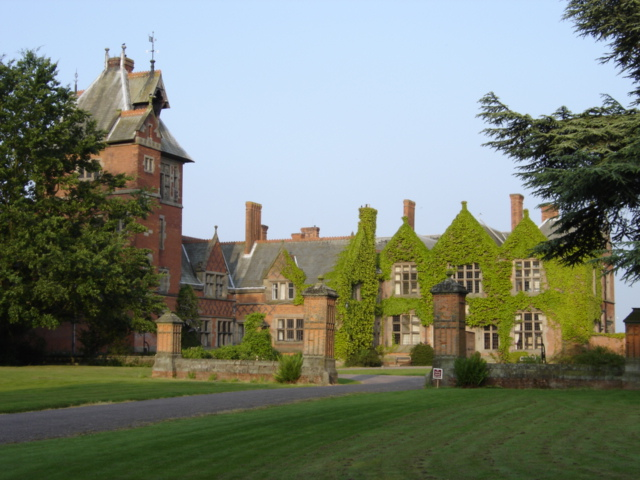
Cloverley Hall today

Cloverley Hall is a grade II* listed former Victorian country house which stands to the south-east of the village. It was originally built between 1864 and 1870 by architect William Eden Nesfield for Liverpool banker John Pemberton Heywood. In its original form it was unusual in having a great hall in a Victorian building but the main wing was demolished and rebuilt in 1926-7. It is constructed in two storeys to an L-shaped floor plan. After the Second World War it was converted for use as a boys' school and since 1968 has been in use as a Christian Conference Centre.

== Notable people ==
- John Pemberton Heywood, banker (1803-1877), for whom Cloverley Hall was built, buried in churchyard.
- Clem Wilson, cricketer (1875-1944), who was twice Vicar (1910–12 and 1925 to his death) and died in the village.

== See also ==
- Listed buildings in Ightfield
