= Ightfield =

Village in Shropshire, England

Coordinates: 52.941°N 2.605°W

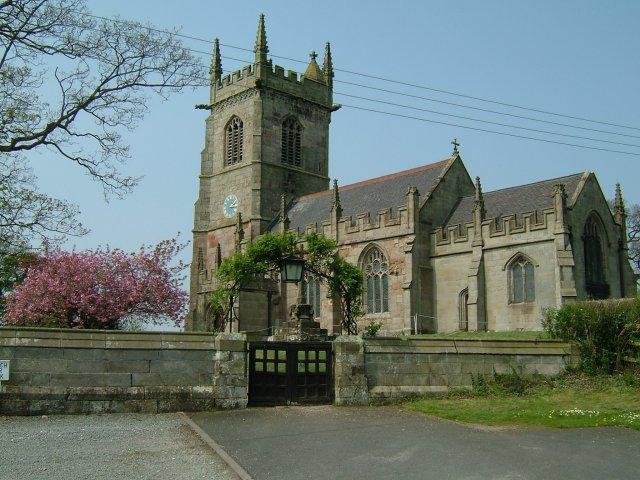
- The church at Ightfield, Shropshire

- Location within Shropshire
- Population: 529 (2011)
- OS grid reference: SJ593383
- Civil parish: Ightfield
- Unitary authority: Shropshire
- Ceremonial county: Shropshire
- Region: West Midlands
- Country: England
- Sovereign state: United Kingdom
- Post town: WHITCHURCH
- Postcode district: SY13
- Dialling code: 01948
- Police: West Mercia
- Fire: Shropshire
- Ambulance: West Midlands
- UK Parliament: North Shropshire

Ightfield is a small village and civil parish in Shropshire, England. The population of the parish at the 2011 census was 529.

Within the civil parish boundaries is another small village - Calverhall.

Ightfield is situated in a rural area, with many of its roots being in farming. In fact, the name could be derived from the Old English 'Ihtfeld' collocated from 'iht'= creature + 'feld'= field. This would be plausible considering the area's long agricultural history. Over the years, the number of farmers in the area has declined, with only a handful remaining. Due to the reduced amount of agricultural activity, the village expanded slightly, with the addition of two new housing estates built on previously agricultural land.

It was mentioned in the hundred of Hodnet as Istefelt in the Domesday Book in 1086. Though not as large as some parishes in the area, it had its own priest, which implies an established community which had its own church. In the 12th century the parish became part of the Hundred of Bradford (probably the North Division), and continued so until the late 19th century.

Ightfield had a local public house for travellers to break up their long journeys by horse and cart. It was converted into a private home some years ago.

The church of St John the Baptist, though partly rebuilt in the 19th century, has 15th-century origins. It stands on the northern edge of the village on a small rise. It features gargoyles. The tower contains a peal of six bells, and the father of Shropshire novelist Mary Webb, George Meredith, is buried in the churchyard next to his father Rev. Edward Meredith, sometime rector of the parish.

Ightfield Church is part of a network of five local churches (Ash, Moreton Say, Ightfield, Calverhall, Adderley - abbreviated AMICA) which are within a 6-mile (9.7 km) diameter of each other. From Autumn 2023 they will be served by the Reverend Martin Heath, who will reside in the benefice Rectory. The Rectory was for a period of time known as The Amica Centre which was the central administrative hub and a community centre for the AMICA Benefice. The house is located to next to the church.

The benefice website is located at .

The loss of the post office in 2002 left the villagers in fear over the economic and structural growth of the village, with many having to buy groceries in the nearby town of Whitchurch. However, this did not hinder the development of multiple new housing estates.

The veterinarian, Tom Leonard, who appeared on Vets in Practice, was raised 4 miles (6.4 km) outside the village. He and his young family still reside there. He has a veterinary practice in the nearby towns of Whitchurch and Crewe.

== See also ==
- Listed buildings in Ightfield
