= Bletchley, Shropshire =

Coordinates: 52.898°N 2.562°W

Bletchley
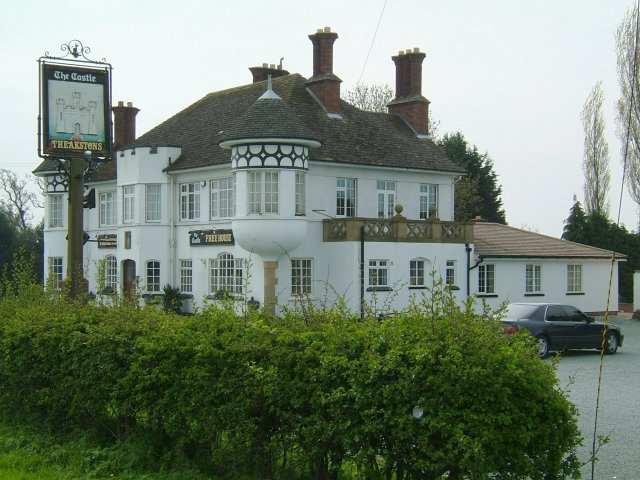
- The Castle public house, Bletchley

- Location within Shropshire
- OS grid reference: SJ621335
- Civil parish: Moreton Say
- Unitary authority: Shropshire
- Ceremonial county: Shropshire
- Region: West Midlands
- Country: England
- Sovereign state: United Kingdom
- Post town: MARKET DRAYTON
- Postcode district: TF9
- Dialling code: 01630
- Police: West Mercia
- Fire: Shropshire
- Ambulance: West Midlands
- UK Parliament: North Shropshire

Bletchley is a village in Shropshire, England, near Market Drayton. It is situated close to the A41 Roman road.

== See also ==
- Listed buildings in Moreton Say
