= Shropshire Archives =

Coordinates: 52°42′39″N 2°45′6″W

Shropshire Archives is the archive and local studies service for the historic county of Shropshire, which includes the borough of Telford and Wrekin. It is located in Shrewsbury, England, and is accredited through the Archive Service Accreditation. It is tasked with preservation and accessibility of past and present materials compiled into collections that are related to Shropshire, dating from the early 12th to the 21st century. The archives offers access to materials and services to researchers, historians, family genealogists, information professionals, and curious citizens.

Shropshire Archives is funded by Shropshire Council and Telford and Wrekin Council and is supported by an active friends organisation - the Friends of Shropshire Archives. The service has attracted external funding from bodies such as the Heritage Lottery Fund and the Arts Council.

As of January 1, 2025, the Shropshire Archives are temporarily operating at a reduced service as the archival staff is tasked with the coordination, inventory, and implementation of moving over 55,000 boxes of materials from Shirehall. It will be open to the public one day a week, Thursday 10am-5pm, and they offer free admission for visitors. '

== History ==
In 1995, the County Record Office and Local Studies Library were brought together in a purpose built building just off Castle Gates in Shrewsbury town centre. From 1995 to 2003, the building was known as the Shropshire Records and Research Centre. In 2003, after consultation, the name was changed to "Shropshire Archives – gateway to the history of Shropshire and Telford".

In the courtyard, is a mosaic showing the historic extent of Shropshire with a leopard and the county motto "Floreat Salopia" / "May Shropshire Flourish". The area where the building now stands was formerly "Blower's Repository" (for furniture) and is located just below the main Shrewsbury Library building. Steps lead down from the courtyard to the town bus station further down the hill.

In 2008, a plaque was unveiled at the archive to commemorate the 725th anniversary of the execution of the last native prince of Wales, Dafydd ap Gruffydd.

== Collections ==
The Shropshire Archives houses over six miles of materials. Popular collections include:

- Baptism, marriage, and burial records
- Cemetery records
- Council and borough records
- Census returns
- School records
- Pedigree records
- Maps and plans
- Newspapers
- Images, prints, and watercolors
- Hospital and health records
- Fire insurance policies
- Crime and punishment records
- Poll books and Electoral registers
- Local history library
- Poor law and workhouse

These materials are available in the online catalog, or at Shropshire Archives typically on microfiche or microfilm. Shropshire Archives also houses uncatalogued material related to individuals, families, businesses, clubs, and other organisations connected with area. As the materials are catalogued, they are given a spotlight on the new collections webpage. The National Archives Discovery Catalog houses some of Shropshire Archives collection records as well.

== Provided Services ==
=== Remote Research ===
Shropshire Archives offers a vast majority of their collection online for remote access. Patrons can put in orders for copies of materials or utilize the research guides that archivists have provided, detailing the specific research process, additional sources, and how to use them.

=== Research Services ===
Shropshire Archives provides research services at a cost for their patrons. Services provided:

- Short search - meant for single source, quick look up information
- Family history research - in depth research from multiple sources pertaining to related person(s)
- House history research - extensive research, starting with a summary of current records and working backward from there to build a chronological report
- Commercial searches - meant for business research

=== Digital Copies ===
Shropshire Archives offers services to make copies of collection records at a cost for patron usage. These copies are available in different formats such as microfiche, digital images, print, photocopies, and pdfs. They also provide digitization service to patrons wanting to digitize their own personal collections.
