= Coalbrookdale Institute =

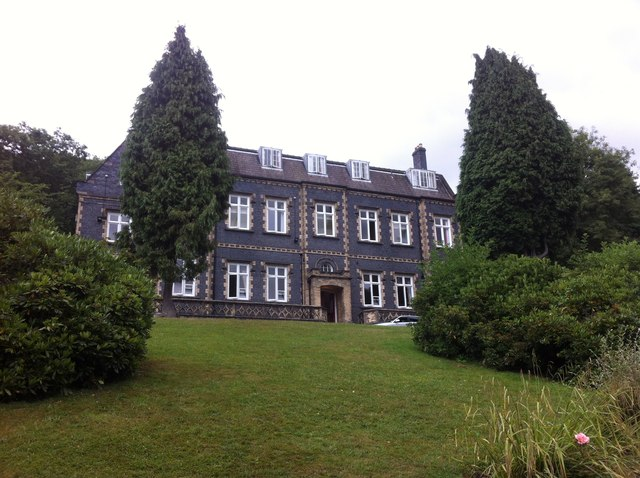

- Location within Shropshire
- 52°38′07.8″N 2°29′18.7″W
- Location: Coalbrookdale, Shropshire
- OS grid reference: SJ 670 043

History
- Built: 1859

Site notes
- Architect: Charles Crooke

Listed Building – Grade II*
- Designated: 26 March 1968
- Reference no.: 1054148

Coalbrookdale Institute is a former library and scientific institute in Coalbrookdale, Shropshire, England. Dating from the mid-19th century it most recently used as a youth hostel. The building is a Grade II* listed building.

== History ==
The Coalbrookdale Literary and Scientific Institution was formed in 1853 supported by the Coalbrookdale Company. The Institute was commissioned to provide a home for the institution's library and to be a meeting venue. The cost of the building was met by the Coalbrookdale Company and the building was designed by the works manager of the Coalbrookdale Company, Charles Crooke.

Opened in May 1859 the institute was used as a venue for lectures and also was the home the Coalbrookdale School of Art. In 1899 the Literary and Scientific Institution merged with the Coalbrookdale Social Club and the institute became a base for outdoor activities as well as the existing technical and arts schools.

In 1928 the institute was purchased by Shropshire County Council who relocated the technical and art colleges to the Walker Technical College in Wellington and made the institute a venue for adult education.

During the second half of the 20th century the institute closed but with the creation of the Ironbridge Gorge Museum Trust (IGMT) in 1968 there was interest in developing the institute as a youth hostel, a plan that was completed in 1980 with YHA opening the building as a hostel.

In March 2026 all the assets and their operation, including the Institute were handed over to the National Trust by IGMT. YHA operations at the site ended at this time.

== Architecture ==
1921 image of the institute showing the roof and roofline details as originally built

The institute is a two-storeyed building built of blue bricks produced in the Coalbrookdale Company's own brickworks at Lightmoor. The brickwork is picked out with yellow brick dressings and has three flat gables with a Mansard roof. When built there was a pitched roof and the gables topped with pediments with "Literary and Scientific Institute" in raised lettering across the frieze but these features were removed in the 1920s. The style of the building was described contemporaneously as Tudor or Tudor Gothic.
