= Longford, Moreton Say =

Coordinates: 52.902°N 2.529°W

Longford
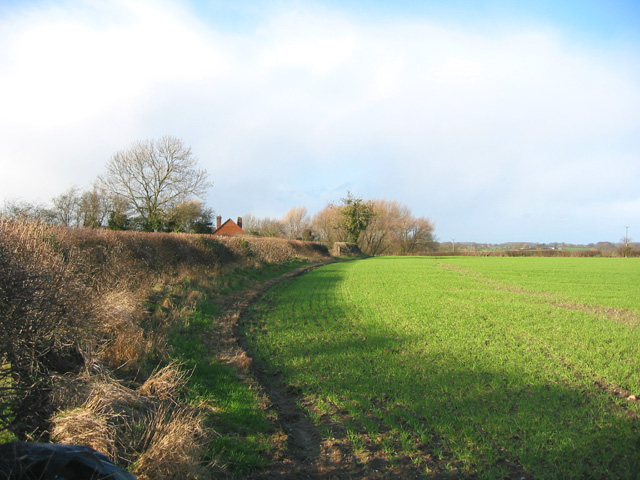
- Fields just outside Longford

- Location within Shropshire
- OS grid reference: SJ645340
- Civil parish: Moreton Say
- Unitary authority: Shropshire
- Ceremonial county: Shropshire
- Region: West Midlands
- Country: England
- Sovereign state: United Kingdom
- Post town: MARKET DRAYTON
- Postcode district: TF9
- Dialling code: 01630
- Police: West Mercia
- Fire: Shropshire
- Ambulance: West Midlands
- UK Parliament: North Shropshire

Longford is a small village near the town of Market Drayton, Shropshire, England. It is just off the A53, near to Ternhill and lies in the parish of Moreton Say.

Longford is 1.5 miles west of Market Drayton and 1 mile southeast of Moreton Say. A topographical guide to Shropshire published in 2005 describes Longford as a "charming hamlet on a rise in undulating country."

The village name is believed to come from a great road that existed in Roman times and was simply known as the Longford. By 1319 it was a Royal road between Bletchley and Hinstock to the south. The village, not on the road, is located just east of Bletchley.

== Notable people ==
- Major-general Sir James Rutherford Lumley KCB (1773–1846), Bengal Army

== See also ==
- Listed buildings in Moreton Say
