= Styche Hall =

House in Moreton Say, Shropshire, England

Coordinates: 52°55′04″N 2°31′48″W

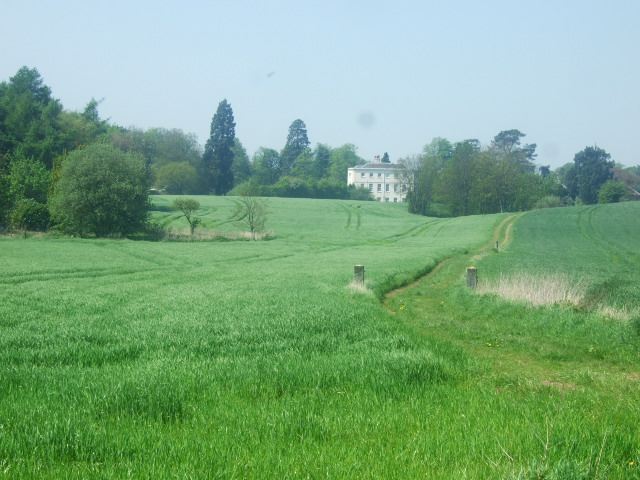
Styche Hall. Photo taken from nearby fields.

Styche Hall is a country house near Market Drayton, Shropshire. It was home to the Clive family and is a Grade II listed building.

Styche belonged to the Clive family, and Robert Clive was born in the old timber-framed house in 1725. On his return from India in 1760, he decided to rebuild Styche Hall. He commissioned Sir William Chambers, who carried out the rebuilding between 1762 and 1766. Further alterations were carried out by Joseph Bromfield of Shrewsbury in 1796–98 for his son, Robert Clive (1769–1833). These included bays, and it is possible that the second floor was added at the same time. Further modifications were carried out around 1900. The building is now divided into flats.

The Hall, its grounds and neighbouring buildings are the private residence of several families, they are not open to the general public.

== See also ==
- Listed buildings in Moreton Say
