= Longford, Telford and Wrekin =

Village in Shropshire, England

Coordinates: 52.761°N 2.406°W

Longford
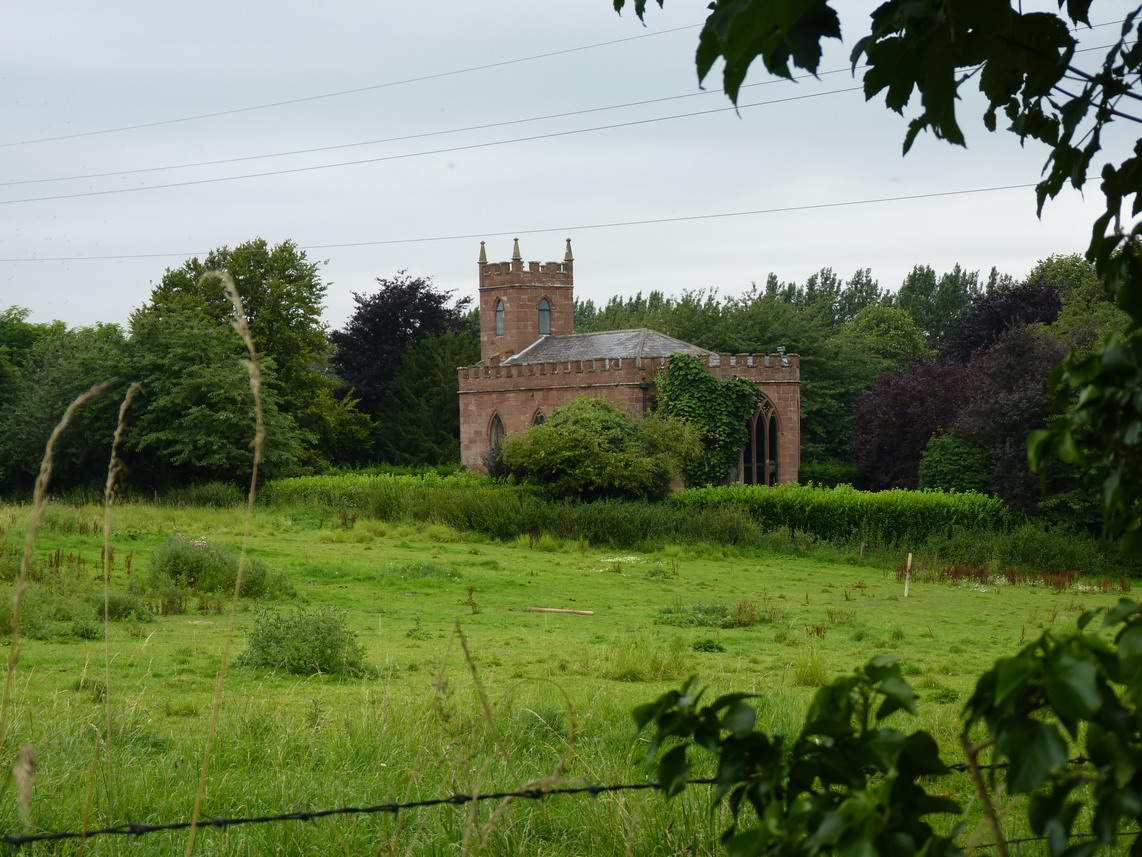
- Former church, Longford

- Location within Shropshire
- OS grid reference: SJ726182
- Civil parish: Church Aston
- Unitary authority: Telford and Wrekin
- Ceremonial county: Shropshire
- Region: West Midlands
- Country: England
- Sovereign state: United Kingdom
- Post town: NEWPORT
- Postcode district: TF10
- Dialling code: 01952
- Police: West Mercia
- Fire: Shropshire
- Ambulance: West Midlands
- UK Parliament: The Wrekin

Longford is a village and former civil parish, now in the parish of Church Aston, in the Telford and Wrekin district, in the ceremonial county of Shropshire, England. It is near the town of Newport. In 1961 the parish had a population of 102. On 1 April 1988 the parish was abolished and merged with Church Aston.

== History ==
Roman coins and medieval artifacts have been discovered in the village and it was listed in Domesday Book in 1086 with a population of 23 households, 13.5 plough lands and a mill. The historic manor covers 1,306 acres and includes the townships of Brockton and Stockton. Sites of historic importance include: Longford Hall, a late 16th-century dovecote, Church of St Mary, 13th century Talbot Chapel, remains of a mill race and several farm buildings.

During the English Civil War, the Battle of Longford was fought here. On 25 March 1644, Colonel Thomas Mytton, commanding 500 Parliamentarians, was headed for the Royalist ("Cavaliers") strongholds of Lilleshall Abbey and Lea Castle, paused at Longford which was garrisoned by Parliamentarians ("Roundheads") to rest his men. There, however, Sir William Vaughan and Colonel Robert Ellice leading local Royalist forces found Mytton and routed him. Having driven off Mytton, the Royalists then besieged the small garrison which took shelter in Longford Hall. The Hall held out for a week before surrendering to the Royalists 2 April 1644.

In the late autumn of 1645, Oliver Cromwell appeared before Longford. The village was quickly taken and the General immediately placed Longford Hall under siege. Upon Cromwell's call for the garrison to surrender, Sir Bartholomew Pell, the Royalist commander, entered into negotiations with Cromwell, winning favourable terms. Pell surrendered to Colonel Hawson and Major Kelsy. Under the terms of surrender, the garrison was to surrender their arms “without imbezeling”. Pell and his 14 officers were allowed to retain their horses, swords and pistols. The garrison was to be escorted toward Oxford. Once these terms were met, Pell and the remaining 14 officers would leave Longford Hall.

=== Longford Hall ===
Longford Hall was built in 1275 by Adam de Brompton and owned by the Talbot Earls of Shrewsbury. In April 1644 it was captured by Royalists and subsequently demolished. The present house was built on the site 1794-97 by Colonel Ralph Leeke and designed by Joseph Bonomi. Longford Hall is now the junior boarding house and sports fields of Adams' Grammar School.

== Geological ==
The area is situated on the Brockton Fault. Sandstone (Kidderminster Conglomerate) and slate are prevalent in the area and were once mined at Brockton, Stockton and Church Aston.

== See also ==
- Listed buildings in Church Aston
