= Church Aston =

Village and parish in Shropshire, England

Coordinates: 52.757°N 2.386°W

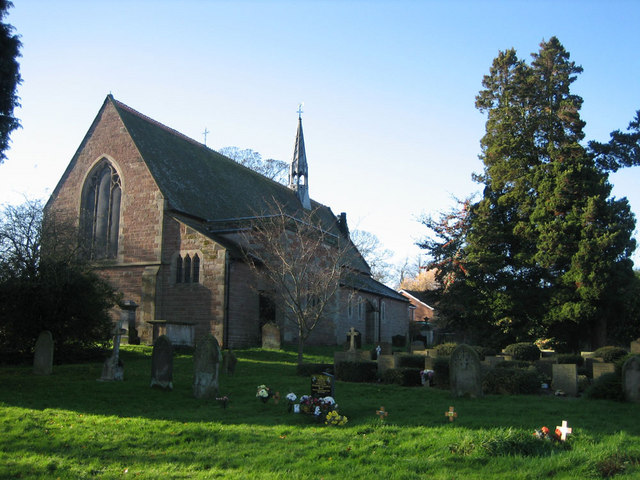
- The Church of St Andrew at Church Aston

- Location within Shropshire
- Population: 1,354 (2011)
- OS grid reference: SJ739178
- Civil parish: Church Aston
- Unitary authority: Telford and Wrekin
- Ceremonial county: Shropshire
- Region: West Midlands
- Country: England
- Sovereign state: United Kingdom
- Post town: NEWPORT
- Postcode district: TF10
- Dialling code: 01952
- Police: West Mercia
- Fire: Shropshire
- Ambulance: West Midlands
- UK Parliament: The Wrekin

Church Aston is a village and parish in Shropshire, England. The population of the civil parish at the 2011 census was 1,354.

It is to the south of Newport, though has become merged with the town in recent years due to suburban growth.

Also in the parish is the small village of Longford and part of the hamlet of Cheswell.

== Notable residents ==
- Major General Francis Ventris – British Army officer, Commander of British Forces in China, grew up at Church Aston while his father was Rector there.
- Arthur Colegate – Conservative politician, lived at Church Aston Manor at time he was MP for The Wrekin 1941–1945.
- Iraj Mottahedeh – retired Anglican Bishop in Iran, lives in Church Aston.

== See also ==
- Listed buildings in Church Aston
