= Adderley =

Village in Shropshire, England

Coordinates: 52.954°N 2.504°W

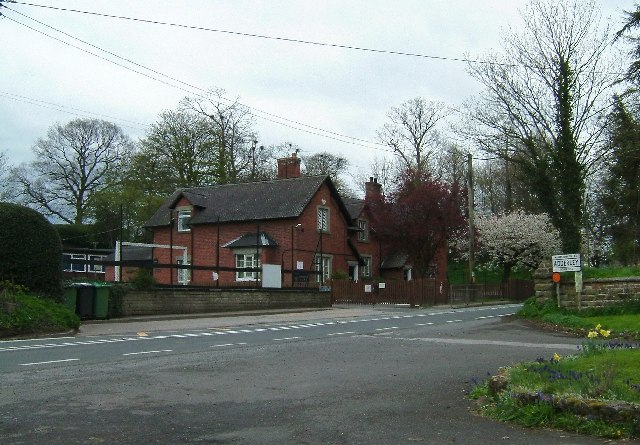
- Adderley School

- Location within Shropshire
- Population: 372 (2011)
- OS grid reference: SJ661397
- Civil parish: Adderley
- Unitary authority: Shropshire
- Ceremonial county: Shropshire
- Region: West Midlands
- Country: England
- Sovereign state: United Kingdom
- Post town: MARKET DRAYTON
- Postcode district: TF9
- Dialling code: 01630
- Police: West Mercia
- Fire: Shropshire
- Ambulance: West Midlands
- UK Parliament: North Shropshire

Adderley is a village and civil parish in the English county of Shropshire, several kilometres north of Market Drayton. It is known as Eldredelei in the Domesday Book.

The Irish statesman Robert le Poer was parish priest of Adderley in 1319.

Here is the description of the village from The National Gazetteer of Great Britain and Ireland (1868):

"ADDERLEY, (or Atherley), a parish in the hundred of North Bradford, in the county of Salop, 4 miles to the N.W. of Market Drayton. It is situated on the Grand Junction canal and the river Weaver. It comprises the townships of the Morrey and Spoonley. The living is a rectory* in the diocese of Lichfield value £665, in the patronage of Richard Corbet. The church is dedicated to St. Peter. The parochial charities amount to £68 a year. Shavington Hall, the residence of the Earl of Kilmorey, and Adderley Hall are the principal seats."

St Peter's Church, rebuilt in 1801, is a grade I listed building.

Among local facilities is a village hall, opened in 1921 as a First World War war memorial to local men who are commemorated on a brass tablet indoors. The hall replaced a club room which had become inadequate for the needs of the village.

Adderley Hall was completed in 1881 when rebuilt after a fire but was demolished in 1955.

== Shavington Hall ==
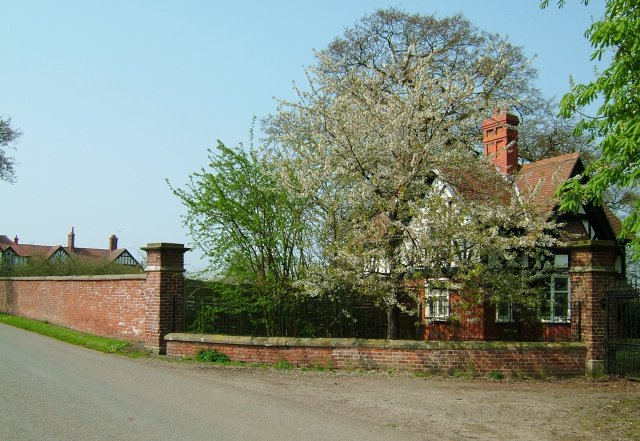
Shavington Park lodge

Shavington Hall was a former country house originally built in 1506 by the Needham family, later the Viscounts Kilmorey and Earls of Kilmorey, who had acquired the Manor of Shavington in 1461. The Hall was rebuilt on a grander scale in 1685 by the 6th Viscount to be their English seat and sold by the third Earl in 1885 to Arthur Pemberton Heywood-Lonsdale, who was appointed High Sheriff of Shropshire for 1888. At that time it stood in a park of 600 acres. The Heywood-Lonsdales improved the house and grounds and bought several adjoining estates. The hall was demolished in 1959 as too expensive to maintain.

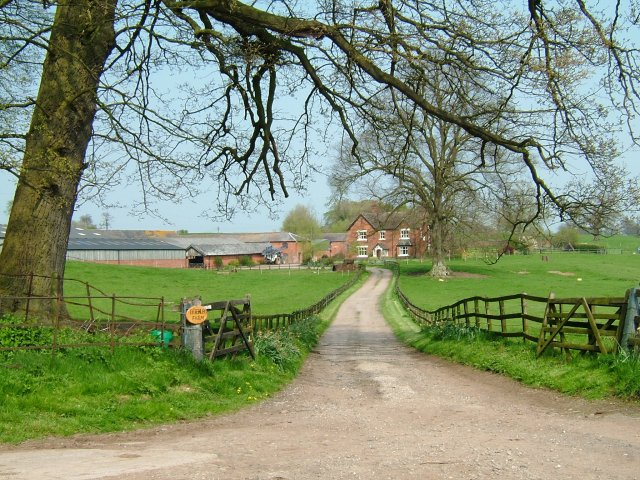
Tittenley Farm

Also of note is Tittenley Farm. The Tittenley Lodge has been a listed building since 1987.

== See also ==
- St Peter's Church, Adderley
