= William Eden Nesfield =

English architect (1835 - 1888)

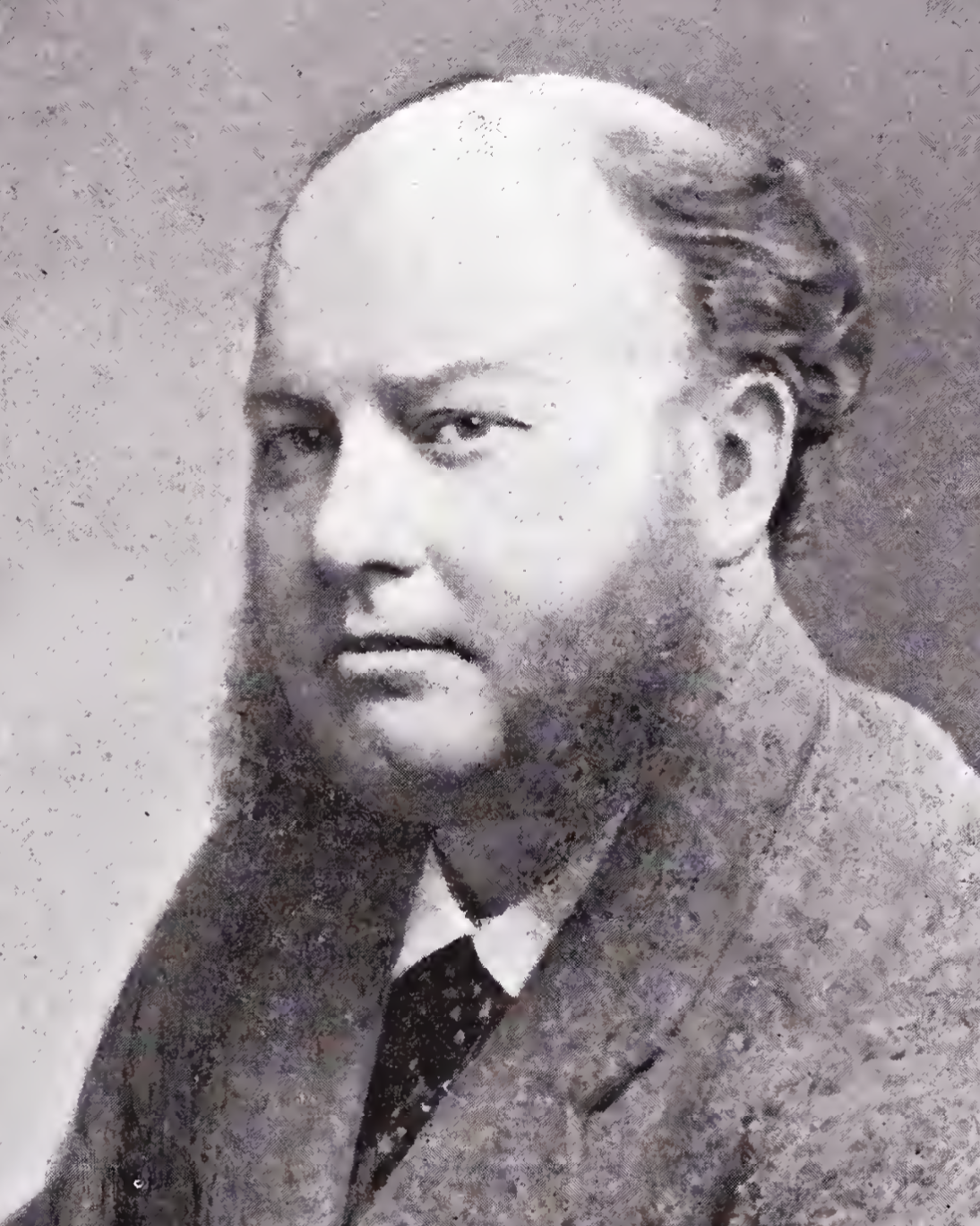
William Eden Nesfield

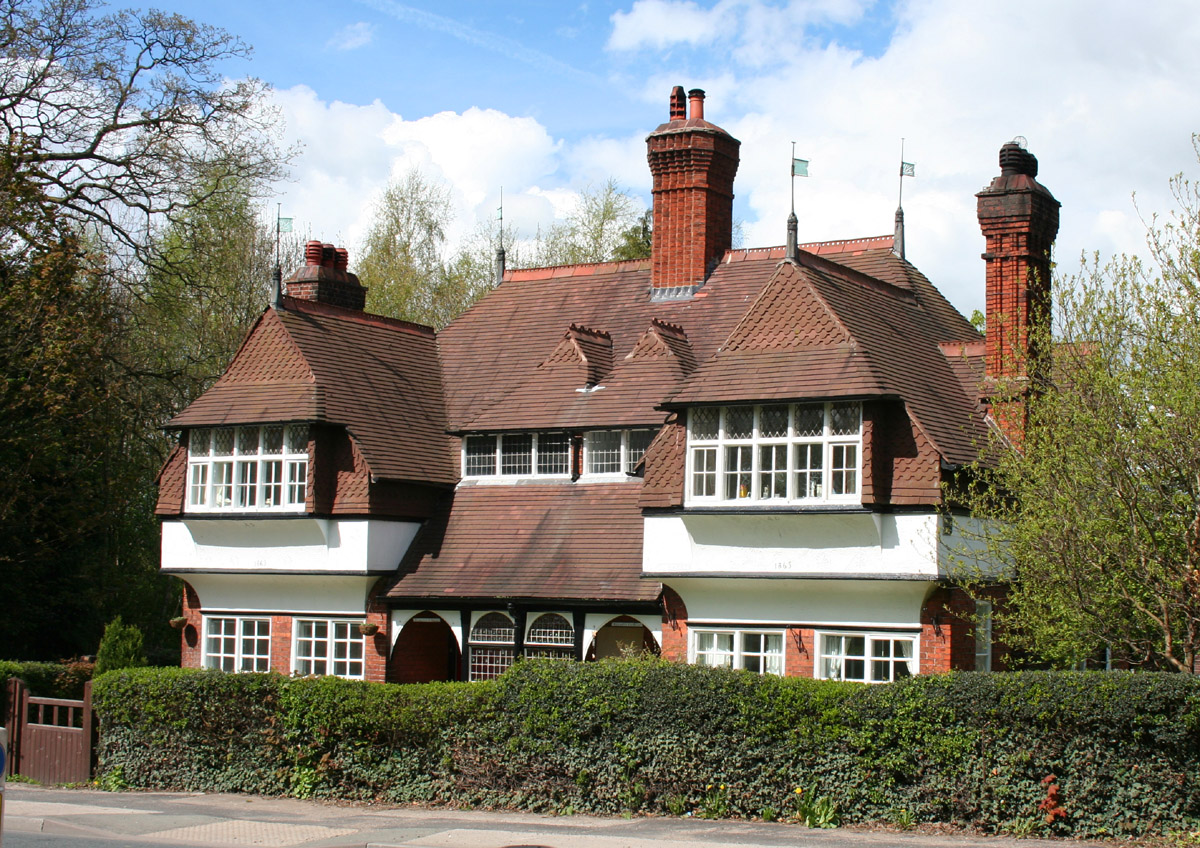
Stowford and Magnolia Cottages, near Crewe, are among W. E. Nesfield's earliest works (1865)

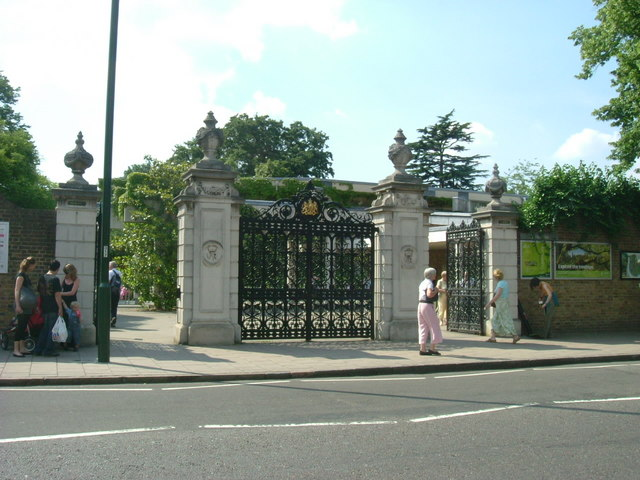
One of W. E. Nesfield's later works (1868); the Victoria Gate, Kew Gardens

William Eden Nesfield (2 April 1835 – 25 March 1888) was an English architect. Like his some-time partner, Richard Norman Shaw, he designed several houses in Britain in the revived 'Old English' and 'Queen Anne' styles during the 1860s and 1870s. He was also a designer and painter.

== Biography ==
William Eden Nesfield was born in Bath on 2 April 1835, the eldest son of the landscape architect and painter William Andrews Nesfield. He was educated at Eton College.

In 1850 he was articled to the architect William Burn, but after two years he moved to the practice of his uncle by marriage, Anthony Salvin. He studied architectural drawing under James Kellaway Colling. He travelled widely in the 1850s, and published his drawings in Specimens of Mediaeval Architecture (1862), which was dedicated to William Craven, 2nd Earl of Craven.

Around 1860 he started his own architectural practice; but he soon linked up with his friend Richard Norman Shaw, with whom he was in a formal partnership between 1866 and 1869, though they kept their jobs separate.

Nesfield and Shaw contributed greatly to the new styles of domestic architecture in Britain, which began in the 1860s and flourished in the 1870s, notably the Old English and Queen Anne styles. Many of Nesfield's clients were rich friends of his father's, and his designs tended to be more extravagant and ornamental than Shaw's. Notable examples were additions to Combe Abbey, Warwickshire (1862–5, mostly demolished); Cloverley Hall, Shropshire (1866–8, partly demolished); Leawood Hall, Holloway, Derbyshire for William Walker owner of the Hat factory Kinmel Hall, Flintshire (1871–4) and Bodrhyddan (1872–4). He also designed many small lodges and cottages, most famously a lodge in Regent's Park (demolished), and another at Kew Gardens (1866–7), both in London. He also designed the Victoria Gate (1868), one of the main entrances into the Gardens, along with nearby Cumberland Gate. At Loughton, Nesfield designed (1877) the church of St Nicholas, and was then commissioned (1878) to rebuild Loughton Hall, both for the Maitland family. In Montgomeryshire, Nesfield largely rebuilt St Beuno's Church, Bettws Cedewain and redesigned Maesmawr Hall in 1876.

Nesfield gave up architectural practice around the time his father died in 1881, and retired to Brighton, where he died in 1888 at the age of 52. He is usually considered one of the most original of the Victorian domestic architects. He was not interested in publicity but preferred to pursue his career privately and enjoy himself with his bohemian friends, many of them artists.
