= Elizabeth Lewis =

Elizabeth Lewis may refer to:

- Elizabeth Washington Lewis (1733–1797), only sister of George Washington to live to adulthood
- Betty Bagby Lewis (1925–2008), American writer and local historian
- Elizabeth Anne Lewis (1843–1924), British temperance activist
- Elizabeth Foreman Lewis (1892–1958), American children's book author
- Elizabeth Langhorne Lewis (1851–1946), American suffragist
