= Harold Edge =

English cricketer

Personal information
- Full name: Harold Emerton Edge
- Born: 8 June 1892; Market Drayton, Shropshire, England
- Died: 24 January 1944 (aged 51); Winsford, Cheshire, England
- Batting: Right-handed
- Bowling: Unknown-arm medium

Domestic team information
- Years: Team
- 1930–1931: Denbighshire
- 1927–1929: Wales
- 1913: Lancashire

Career statistics
Competition	First-class
Matches	3
Runs scored	27
Batting average	6.75
100s/50s	–/–
Top score	19*
Balls bowled	423
Wickets	4
Bowling average	69.00
5 wickets in innings	–
10 wickets in match	–
Best bowling	4/115
Catches/stumpings	5/–
- Source: Cricinfo, 24 August 2011

Harold Emerton Edge (8 June 1892 – 24 January 1944) was an English cricketer. Edge was a right-handed batsman who bowled medium pace, although his bowling arm is not known. He was born in Market Drayton, Shropshire.

Edge made his only first-class appearance for Lancashire against Warwickshire in the 1913 County Championship. In this match, he bowled a total of 29 wicket-less overs, while with the bat he was dismissed in Lancashire's first innings for 3 runs by Percy Jeeves and did not bat in the second innings. He later played first-class cricket for Wales, making the first of his two appearances for Wales in 1927 against the Marylebone Cricket Club. In this match, Edge claimed 4 first-innings wickets, taking 4/115. With the bat unbeaten on 19 in the Welsh first-innings, while in their second-innings he was dismissed for 5 runs by Cyril Ormerod. His second and final first-class appearance for Wales came against the touring South Africans in 1929. Edge went wicket-less in the match, while with the bat he was dismissed for a duck by Quintin McMillan in the Welsh first-innings. He followed this up with the same score and same bowler dismissing him in their second-innings.

He made his debut for Denbighshire in the 1930 Minor Counties Championship against Cheshire. He made ten further Minor Counties Championship appearances for the county, the last of which came against Staffordshire in 1931.

He died in Winsford, Cheshire on 24 January 1944.
