= William Felton (composer) =

English composer

William Felton (1715 – 6 December 1769) was an English composer. He gained an M.A. at St. John's College, Cambridge in 1745 and was a chaplain to the Princess Dowager of Wales. He composed three sets of six concertos, modelled on Handel's and composed the glee, "Fill, fill, fill the glass".

== Biography ==
William Felton was born in Market Drayton, Shropshire. He was educated in Manchester and at St. John's, Cambridge, where he graduated B.A. in 1738 and M.A. in 1745. He was vicar-choral in the choir of Hereford Cathedral in 1741, custos of the vicars-choral in 1769, and chaplain to the Princess Dowager of Wales (Augusta of Saxe-Gotha).

During a time when, according to Charles Burney, players of the harpsichord had little choice of good music; several of Felton's three sets of six concertos for organ or harpsichord and of his eight suites of easy lessons became the "pride of every incipient player in town and country." Felton's gavotte, attained great popularity; it was introduced in Vincenzo Legrenzio Ciampi's opera Bertoldo in 1672. However, it "was too common and vulgar for an opera audience".

Felton's concertos were modelled on those of Handel, whom the amateur held in admiration. Burney relates that Handel was asked, while in the barber's hands, to allow the mention of his name in the list of subscribers to Felton's Second Set. He started up in a fury, and, with his face still in a lather, cried with great vehemence: "Tamn yourseluf and go to der teiffel—a barson make concerto! why he no make sarmon!" and Brown, the leader of the queen's band, who had had the temerity to prefer the modest request, fled from Handel's presence.

No record, in fact, appears of sermons by the composer Felton, but, besides writing for the harpsichord and other instruments, on which he was a skilled performer, he is said to have composed the glee "Fill, fill, fill the glass", and to have acted as steward at the Three Choirs Festivals of Hereford, 1744, and Gloucester, 1745.

Felton died 6 December 1769, and was buried in Hereford Cathedral.
