= Market Drayton Methodist Church =

Coordinates: 52.902195°N 2.489782°W

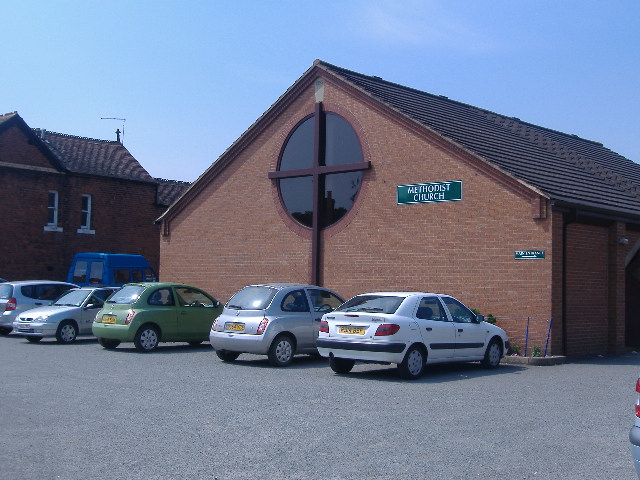
- Market Drayton Methodist Church

- Location within Shropshire
- OS grid reference: SJ 67152 33972
- Location: Market Drayton
- Country: England
- Denomination: Methodist
- Website: http://www.mdmc.org.uk

History
- Status: Open

Architecture
- Completed: 28 September 1985.

Administration
- District: Chester and Stoke

Market Drayton Methodist Church is a Methodist Church on Shrewsbury Road in Market Drayton, Shropshire. It is part of the Market Drayton Churches Together group of churches and Market Drayton Food Bank.

== History ==
Market Drayton's first Methodists held their meetings in private houses in 1799, in places then called Tinkers Lane and Ranters Gullet. A visiting Archdeacon of Salop at that time wrote "there are many church-going Methodists here, probably some hundreds".

In 1807, a Wesleyan Methodist Chapel was built on land between Keelings Lane and Street Lane, now called Salisbury Road and Shrewsbury Road respectively. Ten years later it was enlarged and more seating was added in 1842 by building a gallery. The building had served many purposes during the 172 years, as a chapel, Sunday school, and Wesleyan day-school, continuing as Sunday school and ancillary to the new Chapel which was situated on the other side of the road from 1866.

The 1866 Chapel was a more elaborate building and much more ornate than the first chapel. Memorial stones were laid on 25 August 1864, and the building was completed in 1866. It was set back in its own grounds, and a flourishing cedar-tree dominated the front area of lawn and shrubs.

One main alteration was made in 1888 when a two-storey block replaced the original single-storey vestry. In 1974 this block was demolished to make way for the new building comprising entrance porch, foyer, classroom/minister's vestry, kitchen, lounge and large hall. The Sunday School and Church were united on the one site in 1975 when a new annexe was opened.

On Monday 25 November 1981 a violent wind caused irreparable damage to the church. The building was demolished in 1982. The current building opened on 28 September 1985. This also marked the amalgamation of the Primitive congregation and Wesleyan congregations into one group. This allowed the Primitive Methodist property on Frogmore Road, Market Drayton to be sold.

The building today is of a modern design split over two levels inside.
