= Fordhall Farm =

Organic farm in Shropshire, England

Coordinates: 52.89148°N 2.52612°W

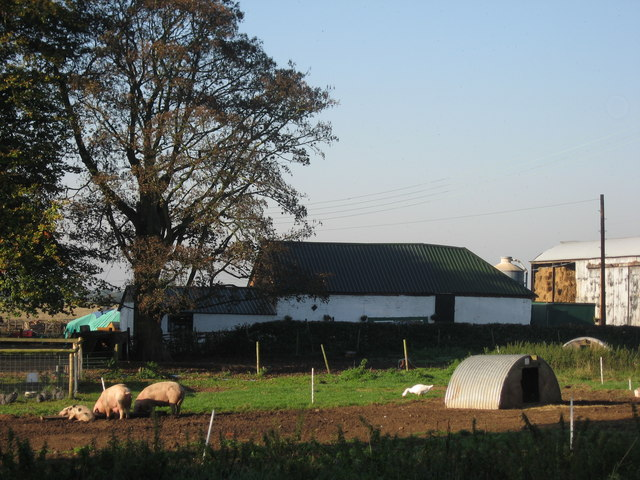
Pigs and pig ark at Fordhall Farm. The white building is the farm shop.

Fordhall Farm is an organic farm of 128 acres, in Market Drayton in north Shropshire, England. It is owned by an industrial and provident society, the Fordhall Community Land Initiative (FCLI), whose aim is to use the farm for community benefit. The farm became a cause célèbre in 2005, when a campaign to raise funds for FCLI to purchase the land gained national press attention.

Within the boundaries of the farm are the remains (earthworks) of Fordhall castle, a scheduled Norman ringwork-and-bailey castle.

== History ==
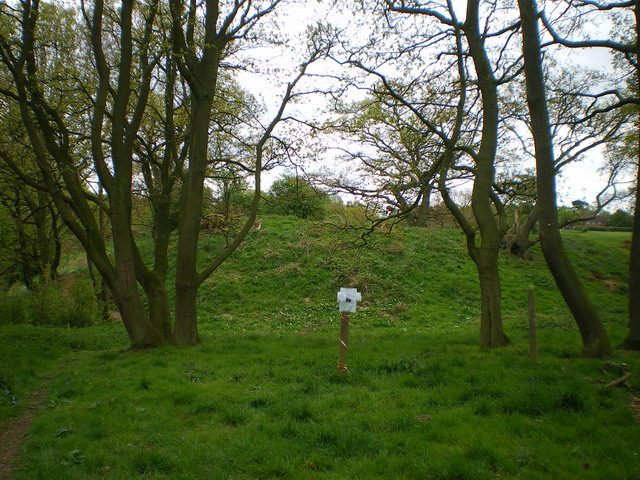
Castle Hill earthwork, Fordhall Farm The hill behind the sign is the visible remains of the Ringwork and Bailey construction on Castle Hill, an English Heritage site, which preserves the remains of the castle built around 1100AD. Some earthworks are also evident on the south side, overlooking the Tern Valley. The original cobblestone floor lies a couple of feet down, and was discovered in the mid-1970s when trees were cleared on the site.

The ringwork was first noted as recently as 1950, although the name of its location, Castlehill Wood, certainly predates the 20th century. The ringwork has been identified with Moretoin Castle, attested in 1215 and possibly the castle mentioned by the antiquary Leland as 'Draiton apon Terne'. It is a monument scheduled under the Ancient Monuments and Archaeological Areas Act 1979 ("Ringwork and bailey castle 390m west of Buntingsdale Hall, List entry Number 1019659")

The farm was formerly part of the Buntingsdale Hall estate, which was broken up in the 20th century. The tenant was an early adopter of organic farming practice, as well as being one of the first producers of yoghurt in the United Kingdom

== Bringing the farm into collective ownership ==
The farm became a cause célèbre in 2005. A campaign was launched on 28 September 2005 to raise funds to purchase the land and bring it into collective ownership. The project had widespread support from celebrities including Alan Titchmarsh, Prunella Scales and Sting, and gained national press attention. The landowner agreed to sell the farm for £800,000 to the Fordhall Community Land Initiative by 1 July 2006. As a result of the campaign, the purchase money was raised. Over 7500 people bought £50 shares, raising £600,000, with £100,000 interest free loans and a £100,000 loan from Triodos Bank. The Fordhall Community Land Initiative is an industrial and Provident Society with charitable status. It is currently owned by over 8000 shareholders from across the world. This society owns all of Fordhall Farm. Volunteer weekends for part-owners are run several times a year, and the farm hosts events and activities involving the local community.

The farm is at grid reference SJ647328 next to the Market Drayton factory of Müller Dairy.
