= St Mary's Church, Market Drayton =

Church in Market Drayton, Shropshire, England

Coordinates: 52°54′11″N 2°28′59″W

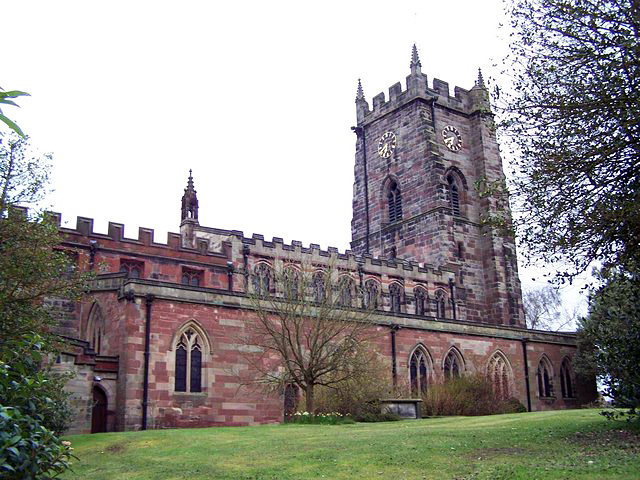
St Mary's Church from the north

St Mary's Church, Market Drayton, stands on the top of a prominent outcrop of red sandstone rock above the River Tern. The church is recorded in the National Heritage List for England as a designated Grade II* listed building.

== History ==
The Domesday Book of 1086 mentions "a Priest in Drayton", and there was likely a wooden Anglo-Saxon church on the same site prior to the construction of the present Norman stone building, which dates to 1150.

In 1201 Pope Innocent III forbade the weekly market which had traditionally taken place in the churchyard after the Sunday morning service. As a result, the market moved northwards a few hundred yards, to its present site in the town. In the 1320s major building work was undertaken in the church. In the Georgian era galleries and box pews were added, but in the 1880s these were removed.

On 9 June 2025, a suspected arsonist set fire to the west door (under the tower) which burnt away a portion of the door and caused the interior to be smoke-logged.

== Internal features ==
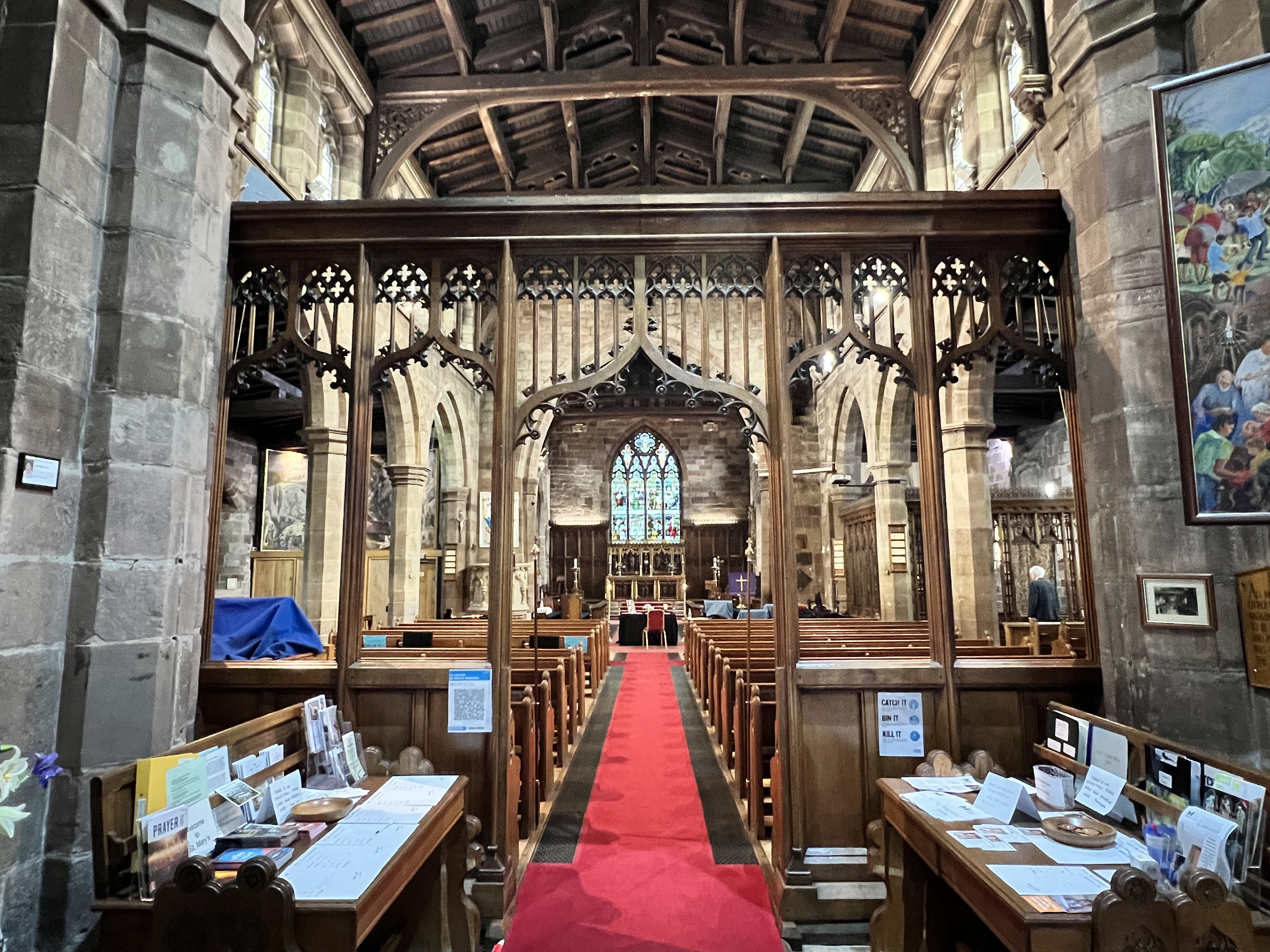
The nave and chancel

The church boasts some fine stained glass. The west window, depicting Queen Victoria, is by Shrigley and Hunt. The east window, showing the Resurrection of Jesus, is by Charles Eamer Kempe (1837–1907). Other Kempe windows are in the south west corner of the nave, depicting Jesus healing the blind near Jericho, raising Lazarus from the dead, and healing the paralytic at Bethesda, and at the north east corner: the flight into Egypt and Presentation of Jesus at the Temple.

The Corbet family, who were lords of the manor and church patrons, are memorialised in several locations in the church. A brass plaque with the Corbet coat of arms serves as a monument to Rowland Corbet (died 1560). Above this is a monument to Dame Alice Corbet (died 1682), who bore twenty children. Her husband Sir John Corbet, the Puritan politician, was buried here in 1662.

The original organ was installed in 1805, and was replaced after 1866. At one time the current organ blocked the view of the altar, but the pipes have since been moved to behind the reredos and the console to the north side of the chancel.

== External features ==
The exterior of the church, largely rebuilt and restored in the late 19th century, consists of red sandstone ashlar with some grey sandstone in the tower. The angle-buttressed tower features battlements that were added in the 16th century and crocketed corner pinnacles from the 19th century. St Mary's has a peal of eight bells, the oldest of which dates to 1700. The tenor bell weighs 1,960 lb (890 kg) and the treble 616 lb (279 kg).

The Norman arch over the main west door is the only remaining part of the original stone church. Early in the 14th century the doorway was incorporated into the superstructure; the large west window above the door features ornate and elaborately patterned stonework typical of the period. The conqueror of India Robert Clive, who attended the nearby Old Grammar School in the 1730s, is said to have once climbed out onto one of the tower's carved gargoyles.

== Buntingsdale Chapel ==
The chapel has been long associated with the owners of Buntingsdale Hall – especially the Bulkleys, the Mackworths, the Tayleurs and again the Mackworths. The part converted into the choir vestry lies over the old family vaults. The paintings by Parry (late 20th century) depict Man's search for God and (on the reverse) Seasons of Faith.

== War memorials ==
The church contains a "Chapel of the Resurrection", a side chapel dedicated, refurbished and panelled in memory of the parish war dead of both of the 20th century's world wars. It has a huge brass memorial tablet unveiled after the First World War and a set of kneelers bearing service badges of the regiments in which those commemorated served. To the right of the main chancel arch are plaques to Major Charles Egerton Hugh Harding (died 1917) and Second Lieutenant John Alberic Everard Upton (killed in the Battle of the Somme 1916), while on the chancel's south wall is a plaque to Lieutenant Charles Henry Lycett Warren, killed at the Siege of Lucknow in 1857.

== See also ==
- Grade II* listed buildings in Shropshire Council (A–G)
- Listed buildings in Market Drayton
