= Market Drayton =

Town and civil parish in Shropshire, England

- Town and civil parish
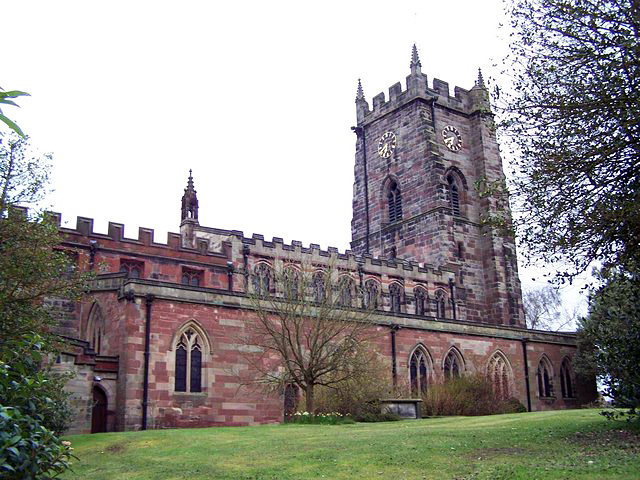
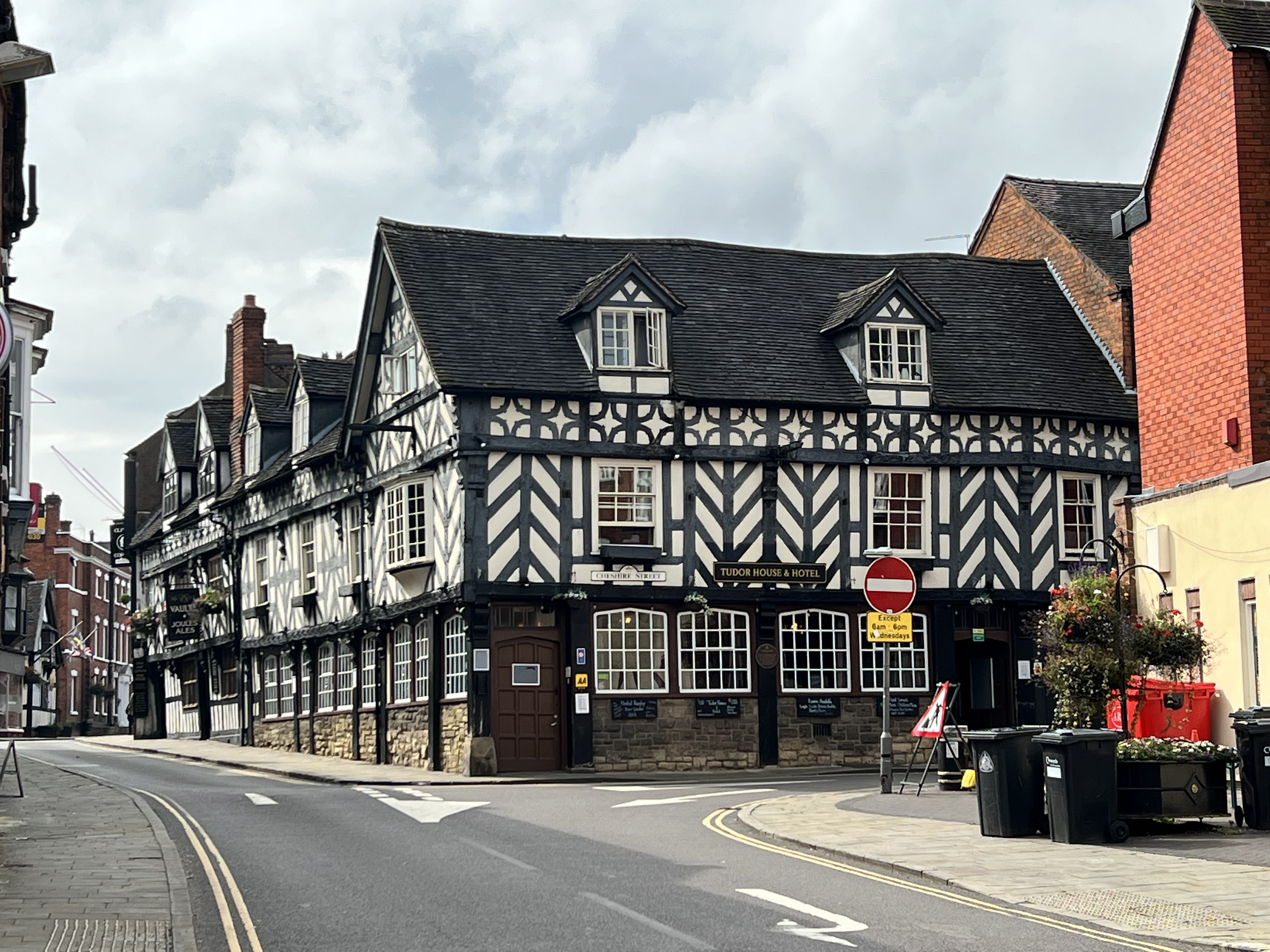
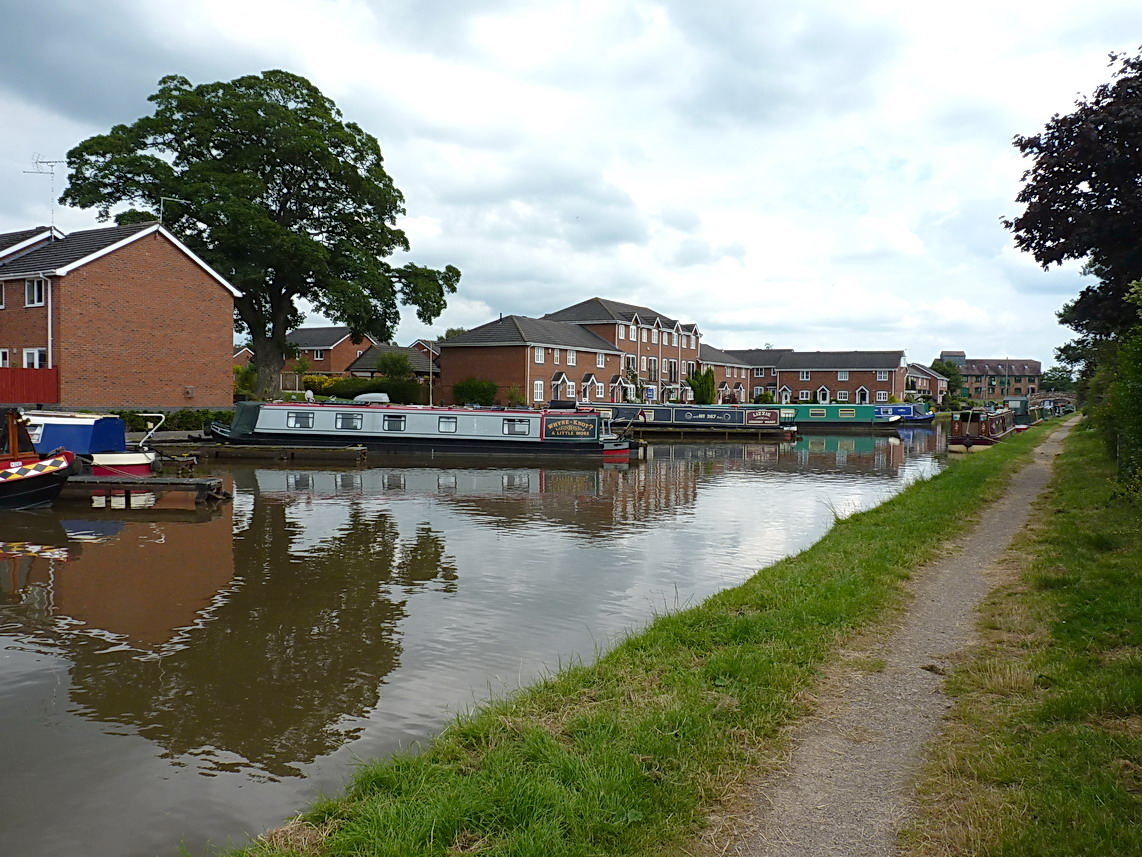
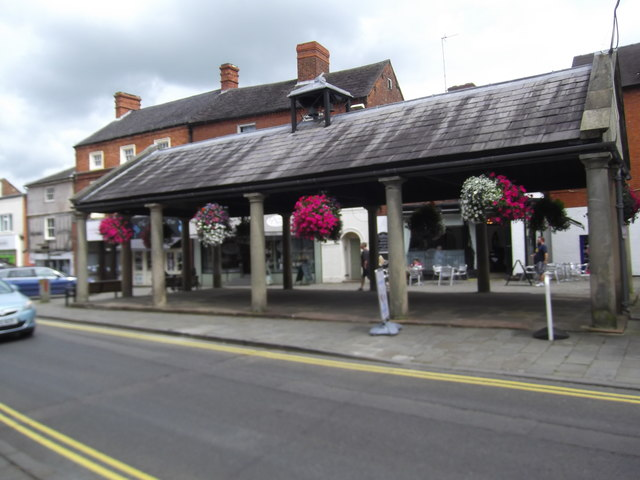
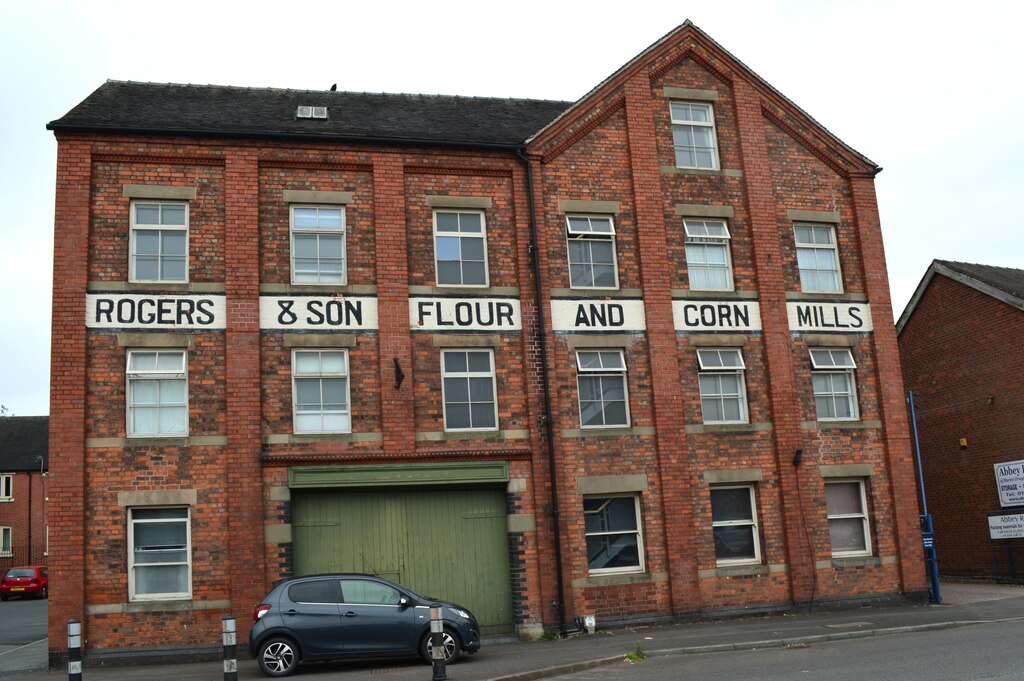
- St Mary's Church Tudor House Hotel Market Drayton Marina Buttercross Drayton Mills

- Location within Shropshire
- Population: 12,588 (Parish, 2021); 12,060 (Built up area, 2021)
- Demonym: Draytonians; Maggot-Dreggs (pejorative); Milk Trays (informal); Gingerbread Men (informal)
- OS grid reference: SJ673321
- Unitary authority: Shropshire
- Ceremonial county: Shropshire
- Region: West Midlands
- Country: England
- Sovereign state: United Kingdom
- Post town: MARKET DRAYTON
- Postcode district: TF9
- Dialling code: 01630
- Police: West Mercia
- Fire: Shropshire
- Ambulance: West Midlands
- UK Parliament: North Shropshire

Market Drayton is a market town and civil parish on the banks of the River Tern in Shropshire, England. It is close to the Cheshire and Staffordshire borders. It is located between the towns of Whitchurch, Wem, Nantwich, Newcastle-under-Lyme, Newport and the city of Stoke on Trent. The town is on the Shropshire Union Canal and bypassed by the A53 road.

== History ==
=== Prehistory ===
"The Devil's Ring and Finger" is a notable site 3 miles (5 km) from the town at Mucklestone. These are across the county boundary in neighbouring Staffordshire. There are also several Neolithic standing stones.

=== Medieval ===
Drayton is recorded in the Domesday Book of 1086 as a manor in the hundred of Hodnet. It was held by William Pantulf, Lord of Wem, from Roger de Montgomery, 1st Earl of Shrewsbury. Drayton is listed as having five households in 1086, putting it in the smallest 20% of settlements recorded.

Domesday also lists Tyrley, which was the site of a castle later (52°54′00″N 2°28′45″W).

In 1245 King Henry III granted a charter for a weekly Wednesday market, giving the town its current name. The market is still held every Wednesday. To the south-east near the A529 an 18th-century farmhouse stands on the site of Tyrley Castle, which was probably built soon after 1066 and later rebuilt in stone in the 13th century.

Nearby Blore Heath, in Staffordshire, was the site of a battle in 1459 between the Houses of York and Lancaster during the Wars of the Roses. Audley's Cross, Blore Heath is located close by.

=== Early Modern ===
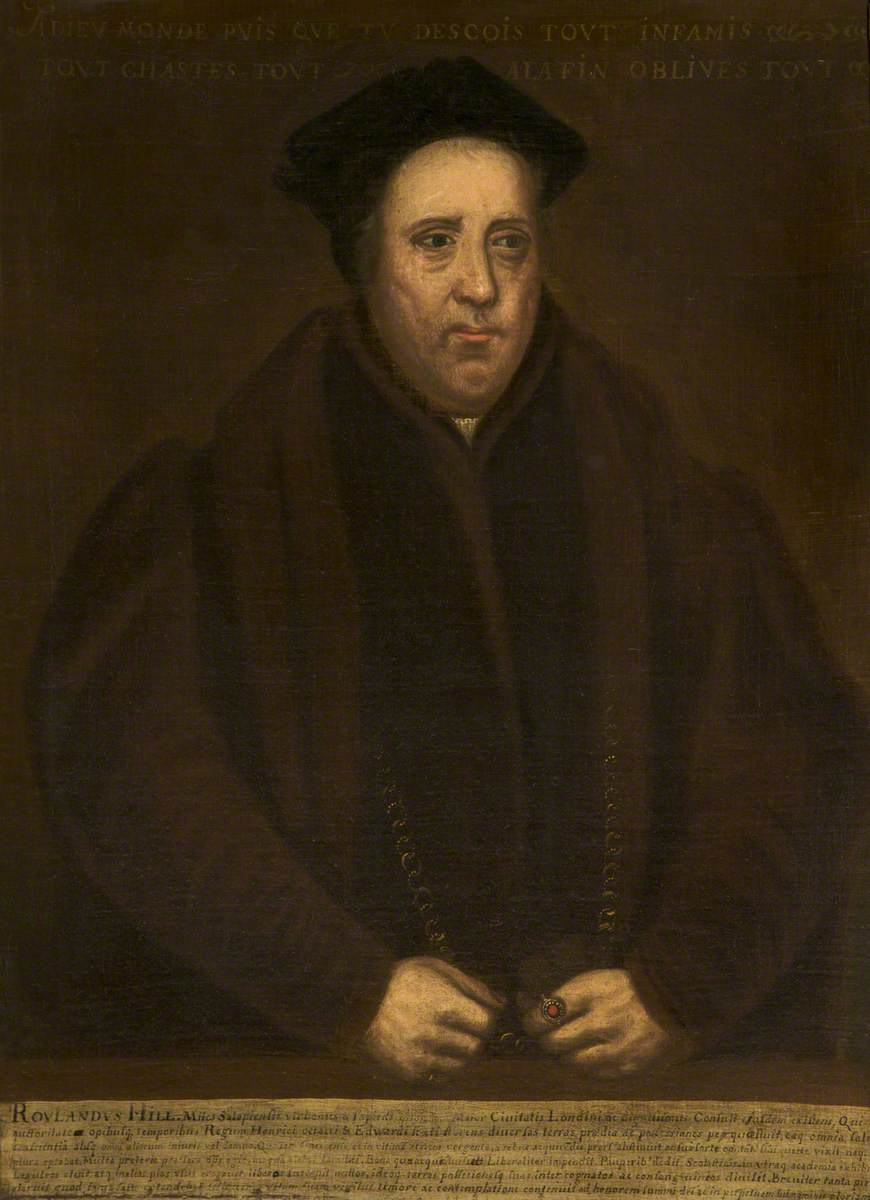
Sir Rowland Hill

Rowland Hill of Soulton, the first Protestant Mayor of London, came from a prominent ancient local family which had extensive property in the area. He is a possible inspiration for Shakespeare and ran the Geneva Bible translation project. He founded the Old Grammar School, in St Mary's Hall, directly to the east of the church in 1555. It contains a 16th-century bust of him. To this day a charity exists in the town to support the education of young people.

Elizabeth Wriothesley, Countess of Southampton (1572 – 1655) was a daughter of the prominent local Vernon family. Her husband was the supposed inspiration of part of Shakespeare's sonnets. She was one of the chief ladies-in-waiting to Elizabeth I in the later years of her reign.

Evidence has recently been found for a skirmish in the English Civil War around 1643.

The great fire of Drayton damaged more than 50% of the town in 1651, quickly spreading through the timber buildings. The buttercross in the centre of the town still has a bell at the top for people to ring if there was ever another fire.

In the 1730s Robert Clive attended the grammar school, and a school desk with the initials "RC" may still be seen. He was expelled from the school, and his record is today contested.

== Governance ==
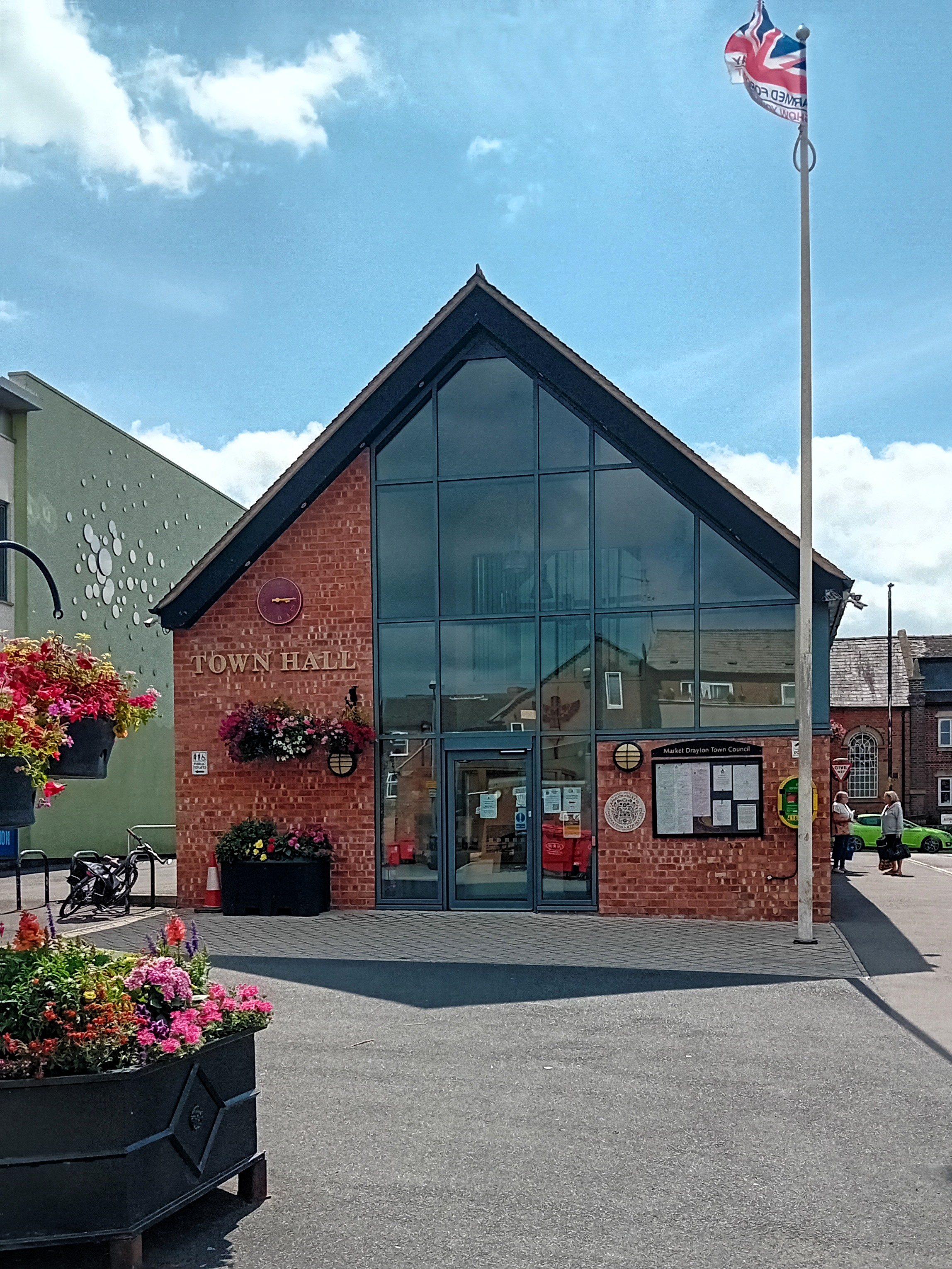
Town Hall, 18 Frogmore Road

There are two tiers of local government covering Market Drayton, at parish (town) and unitary authority level: Market Drayton Town Council and Shropshire Council. The town council is based at the Town Hall at 18 Frogmore Road. The Town Hall was built in 1913 as the Primitive Methodist School. The building was bought by the town council and converted into the town hall in 1998.

=== Administrative history ===
Market Drayton was historically the main settlement in the ancient parish of Drayton in Hales, which had St Mary's Church, Market Drayton as its parish church. The parish straddled the North Bradford hundred of Shropshire and the North Pirehill hundred of Staffordshire. The parish was subdivided into several townships: the Shropshire townships were Drayton Magna (or Great Drayton, covering the central part of the parish around Market Drayton and including the parish church), Drayton Parva (or Little Drayton), Betton, Longslow, Sutton and Woodseaves. The Staffordshire townships were Almington, Blore, Hales and Tyrley.

From the 17th century onwards, parishes were gradually given various civil functions under the poor laws, in addition to their original ecclesiastical functions. In some cases, the civil functions were exercised by subdivisions of the parish rather than the parish as a whole. In the case of Drayton in Hales, the parish was split into two parts for administering the poor laws: the Shropshire part of the parish and the Staffordshire part of the parish. In 1866, the legal definition of 'parish' was changed to be the areas used for administering the poor laws, and so the Staffordshire part of the old parish became a separate civil parish, which took the name Tyrley, and the Drayton in Hales civil parish thereafter just covered the part of the old parish in Shropshire.

When elected parish and district councils were established in 1894, Drayton in Hales was classed as a rural parish within the Drayton Rural District. Following a campaign to give Market Drayton more powers, it was decided to create an urban district covering the town, removing it from the rural district. The whole civil parish of Drayton in Hales was not considered appropriate for conversion into an urban district, and so it was split. A new parish and urban district called Market Drayton was created, covering the Drayton Magna and Drayton Parva townships. The more rural townships from Drayton in Hales were transferred to other parishes: Sutton and Woodseaves were united into a new civil parish called Sutton upon Tern, Longslow was transferred to Moreton Say, and Betton was transferred to Norton in Hales. These changes all took effect on 1 April 1914.

Market Drayton Urban District was abolished in 1966, when it was reclassified as a rural parish, given a parish council instead of an urban district council, and transferred back to the Drayton Rural District, which was renamed Market Drayton Rural District at the same time. The rural district was replaced by the larger North Shropshire district in 1974. As part of the 1974 reforms, parish councils were given the right to declare their parish to be a town, allowing them to adopt the style "town council" and appoint a mayor. Market Drayton Parish Council subsequently exercised this right, becoming Market Drayton Town Council.

North Shropshire Council was abolished in 2009. Shropshire County Council then took over district-level functions, making it a unitary authority, renamed Shropshire Council.

== Culture ==
The town has an active arts and culture scene mainly based around the Festival Drayton Centre. This centre was established in 1984 and is run by volunteers. Over 40 years it has expanded considerably and includes a thriving cinema, theatre, art gallery and a range of meeting rooms that area available for hire. The Festival Drayton Centre also hosts regular live music and comedy and features event cinema beamed in by satellite from the National Theatre and Royal Opera House.

The Drayton Arts Festival is held every year in October; its 10th anniversary was due in 2023.

Market Drayton has always been a hotbed for musical talent producing a number of bands who have progressed on to achieve national acclaim. In 1981 the town boasted the ‘second best’ school rock band in the country, TSB National School Band runners up, Monovision (Winners were “Mother Hen”). At the same time the local youth club were represented by the Platinum Needles in the NAYC Opportunity Rocks competition final. In early 1981 the Platinum Needles were also featured on the Stoke Musicians Collective album released on Slip Records “Cry Havoc”. During the late ’70s and early ’80s, Market Drayton also boasted one of the only recording studios in Shropshire, Redball Records.

Landmarks in the area include: Pell Wall Hall, Adderley Hall, Buntingsdale Hall, Salisbury Hill, Tyrley Locks on the Shropshire Union Canal and the Thomas Telford designed aqueduct.

== Media ==
Local news and television programmes are provided by BBC West Midlands and ITV Central. Television signals are received from either The Wrekin or Sutton Coldfield TV transmitters. BBC North West and ITV Granada can also be received from the Winter Hill TV transmitter.

Local radio stations are BBC Radio Shropshire, Hits Radio Black Country & Shropshire, Greatest Hits Radio Black Country & Shropshire, Capital North West and Wales and Pure Gold, a community based radio station.

The Shropshire Star is the town's local weekly newspaper.

== Education ==
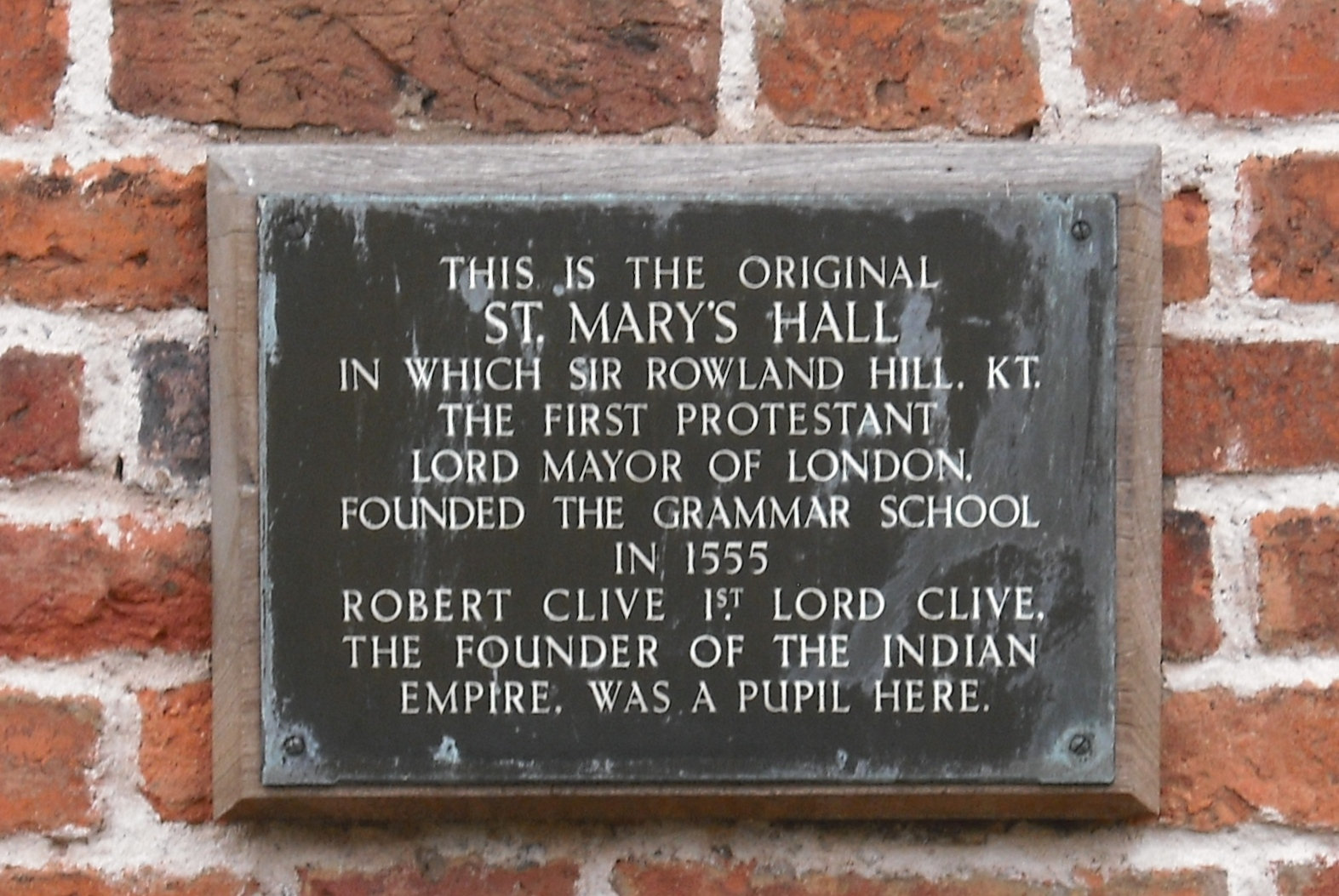
St Mary's Hall plaque

Today, Market Drayton has four schools:

- Longlands Primary School
- Market Drayton Infant School
- Market Drayton Junior School
- Grove School and sixth form college

Grove School is a large secondary school of about 1,100 pupils, all of whom live within 12 miles (19 km) of the town.

== Industry ==
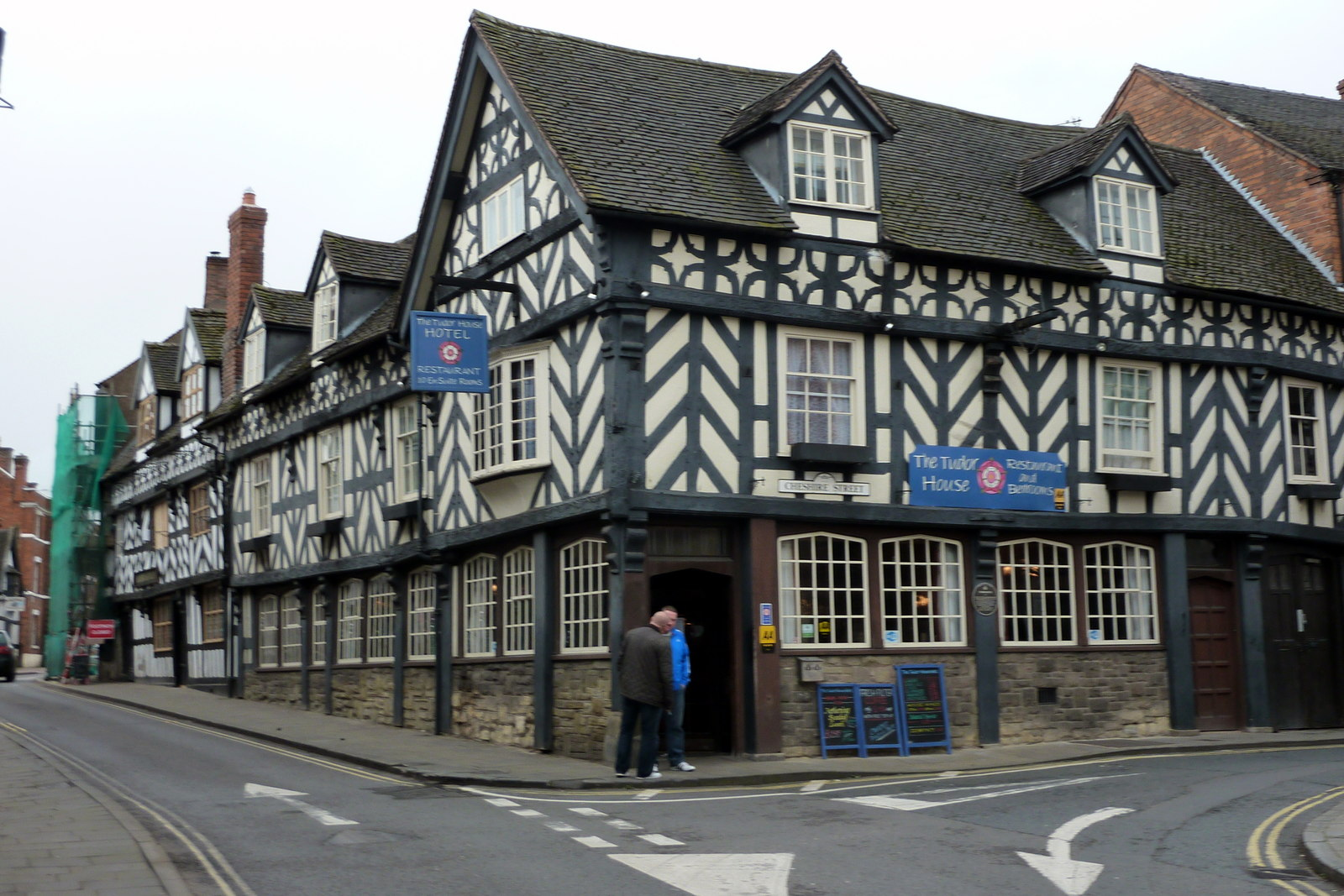
Tudor House Hotel, Market Drayton

In 1965, sausage maker Palethorpe's built a new factory employing 400 people in the town. Purchased by Northern Foods in 1990, the company was merged with Bowyers of Trowbridge, Wiltshire and Pork Farms of Nottingham to form Pork Farms Bowyers. The sausage brand was sold in 2001 to Kerry Group, but the factory remains open as the town's largest employer. It produces various meat based and chilled food products, under both the Pork Farms brand and for third parties, including Asda.

Müller Dairy have a factory making yogurts, which is based alongside the main base of Culina who are a subsidiary of the aforementioned Müller. The town is also the home of Tern Press, a collectible small press publisher of poetry.

The town has been referred to as the "Home of Gingerbread". The first recorded mention of gingerbread being baked in the town dates to 1793, although it was likely made earlier, as ginger had been stocked in high street businesses since the 1640s.

Supplied by a water source running under the town, two breweries operated in the town during the early 20th century. In 2000, Steve Nuttall started a microbrewery, Joule's Brewery Ltd, a revival of a previous Joule's Brewery at Stone, Staffordshire which had been discontinued in 1974. The new company bought the 16th century Red Lion, a pub that formerly belonged to the earlier company, where the brewery was built, completed in 2010. It produces three core ales on the site as well as a number of seasonal beers.

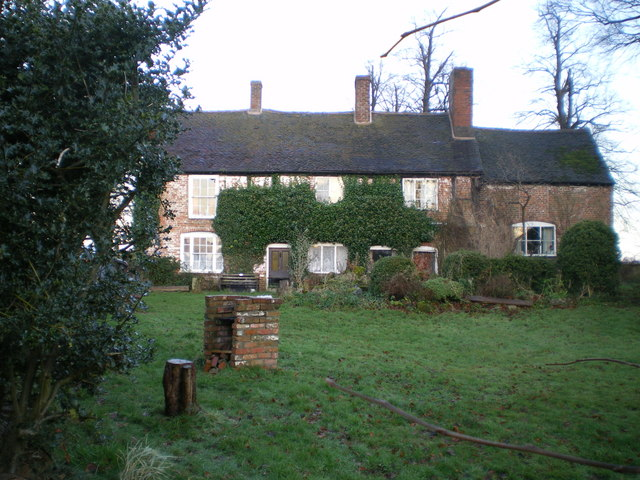
Ford Hall Farm is a community owned farm to the east of the town

Fordhall Farm has 140 acres (0.57 km^{2}) of community-owned organic farmland located off the A53 between the Müller and Tern Hill roundabouts. The farm trail is open to the public during farm shop opening hours, and on the path is the site of Fordhall Castle, an ancient motte and bailey structure which overlooks the River Tern valley.

McDonald's established its first UK net zero carbon restaurant in Market Drayton in December 2021. The building was verified against the UK Green Building Council's net zero carbon framework.

== Sports ==
- Market Drayton Hockey Club train and play at Whitchurch Sir John Talbot's School, due to a lack of hockey facilities in the town. The club currently had 1 men's team, playing in the Midlands Men's Division 9 North West, along with 1 women's team, who currently play in the Midlands Women's Division 5 Moorland.
- Market Drayton Town F.C. of the North-West Counties Football League Division 1 South are based at Greenfields Sports Ground in Market Drayton, which has capacity for approximately 1,000 spectators.
- Market Drayton Rugby club play at Greenfields Sports Ground along with the previously mentioned Market Drayton Town, on Greenfields Lane, and are in the Midlands Division- Midlands 4 West (North).
- Market Drayton Tennis Club is also based at Greenfields and has three all weather floodlit courts; the club plays in a number of Shropshire leagues.

== Transport ==
=== Road ===
By road, Market Drayton is served by one major route, the A53 which runs south from Buxton in Derbyshire to Shrewsbury via Leek, Stoke-on-Trent and Newcastle-under-Lyme.

- A53 | Southbound: Shrewsbury | Northbound: Newcastle-under-Lyme, Stoke-on-Trent, Leek

=== Bus ===
Arriva Midlands operates route 64 through Market Drayton between Shrewsbury and Hanley (Stoke-on-Trent), at an irregular service pattern.

Shropshire Council ran a number of bus services under the 'ShropshireLink' brand in addition to the regular 301 and 302 Market Drayton Town Services but these were withdrawn due to council cutbacks. Service 301 is now operated by Lakeside Coaches.

As of 5 January 2026, the D&G Bus service 340 between Whitchurch and Wellington was introduced, which passes through Market Drayton hourly Mondays to Fridays.

=== Railway ===
Market Drayton had a railway station which opened in 1863 and closed during the Beeching cuts in 1963. The railway station was located on the Wellington and Drayton Railway and Nantwich and Market Drayton Railway of the Great Western Railway network and was also the terminus of the Newcastle-under-Lyme line of the Stoke to Market Drayton Line of the North Staffordshire Railway network.

== Climate ==
Market Drayton was struck by an F1/T3 tornado on 23 November 1981, as part of the record-breaking nationwide tornado outbreak on that day.

== Religion ==
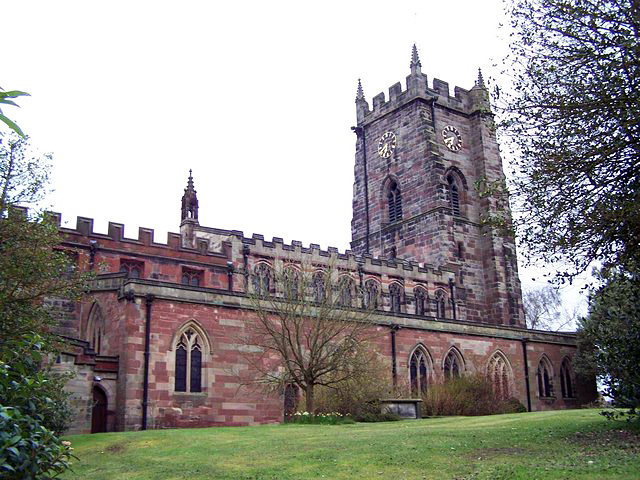
St Mary's Church, Market Drayton from the north

The town currently has five churches. The largest is the Church of England parish church which is St Mary's Church; it dates from 1150, although it was largely rebuilt in 1881–1889, and is grade II* listed. Christ Church, an Anglican parish church, is in Little Drayton, to the west of the town and grade II listed.

The Roman Catholic Church of St Thomas Aquinas & St Stephen Harding dates from 1886 and is grade II listed. There is also a Methodist Church.

== Notable residents ==
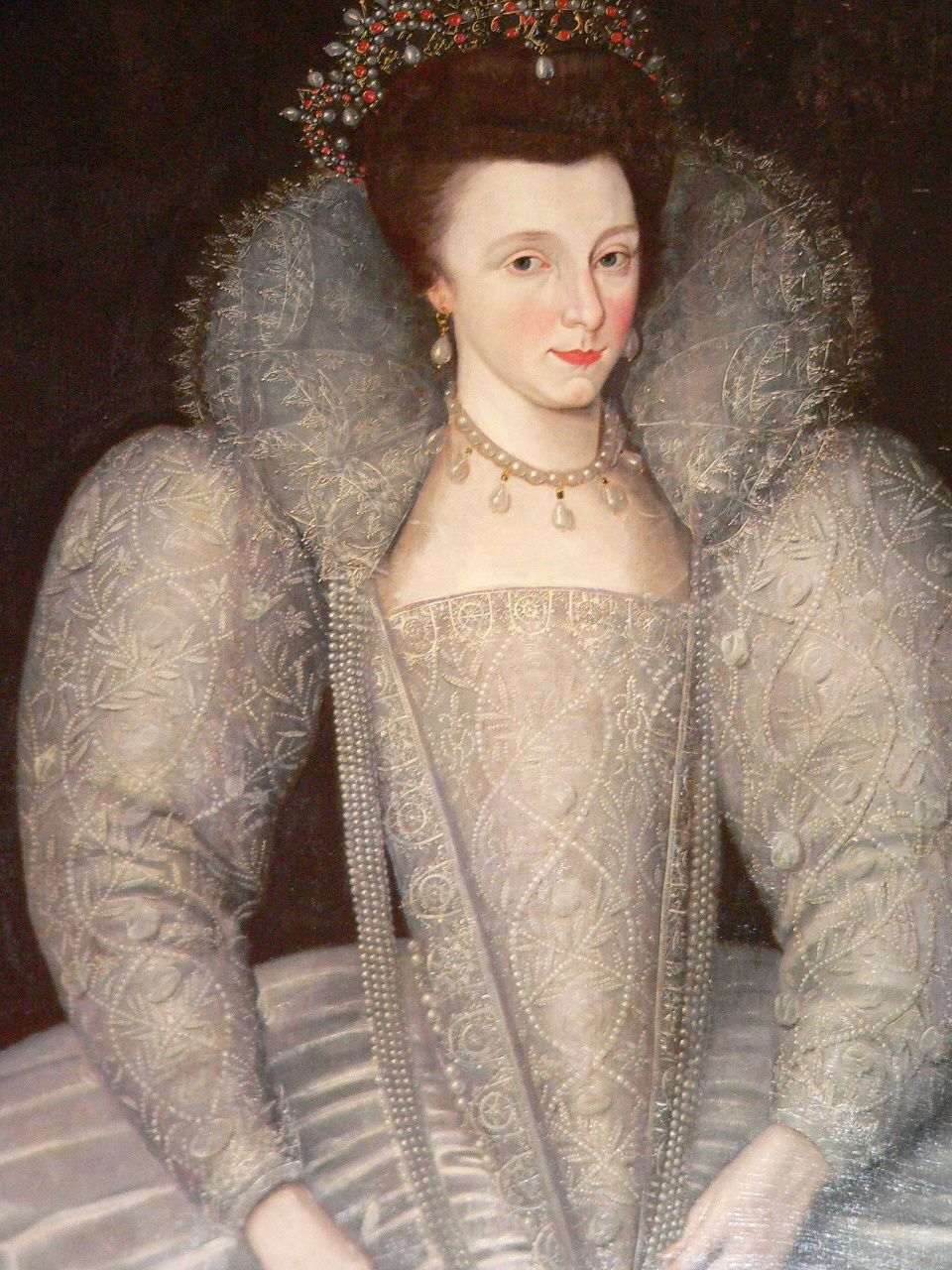
Elizabeth Wriothesley, ca.1595

- Elizabeth Wriothesley, Countess of Southampton (1572 – 1655), lady-in-waiting to Elizabeth I.
- Thomas Povey (ca. 1613 – ca. 1705), the colonial civil servant and friend of Samuel Pepys, was a Londoner, but a branch of his family lived at Woodseaves; the most prominent member of which was Sir John Povey (1621–1679), Lord Chief Justice of Ireland 1673–79.
- William Felton (1715–1769), English composer.
- Elizabeth Anne Lewis (1843/48-1924), temperance activist.
- Mary Cholmondeley (1859 in Hodnet – 1925), novelist. Her bestseller was called Red Pottage.
- Horace Lambart, 11th Earl of Cavan TD (1878-1950), Anglo-Irish peer and clergyman, ultimately Archdeacon of Salop, was Vicar of Market Drayton in 1913-1918.
- Stephen Morrey (1880 – 1921) was an English-born merchant, farmer and political figure in Saskatchewan, Canada. Morrey owned a hardware business in Market Drayton.
- Henry Edward George Rope (1880-1978), poet and editor, served as Roman Catholic parish priest at Market Drayton in 1924-1925.
- Brigadier Sir Alexander Beville Gibbons Stanier DSO & Bar, MC (1899–1995), 2nd Baronet of Peplow Hall, a distinguished Army officer.
- Mervyn Charles-Edwards (1902-1983), ultimately Bishop of Worcester, was Vicar of Market Drayton until 1944.
- Gordon Baldwin OBE (1932-2025), studio potter, settled in Market Drayton where he lived at time of his death.

=== Sport ===
- John Lewis (1855 in Market Drayton–1926), football referee and a founder of Blackburn Rovers F.C..
- Harry Montford (1863 in Market Drayton - 1942), footballer, made single league appearance for Stoke City.
- Harold Emerton Edge (1892 in Market Drayton – 1944) an English cricketer, a right-handed batsman who bowled medium pace.
- Ray Reardon MBE (1932-2004), Welsh professional snooker player, lived in Market Drayton until 1980 and won two of his world titles while living there.
- David Gilford (born 1965) is an English professional golfer. He lives in the town.
- Andy Cooke (born 1974), former footballer, played 481 games mainly for Burnley, Stoke City and Shrewsbury Town.
- Ben Garratt (born 1994 in Market Drayton) footballer, played over 350 games incl. over 200 for Crewe Alexandra F.C..

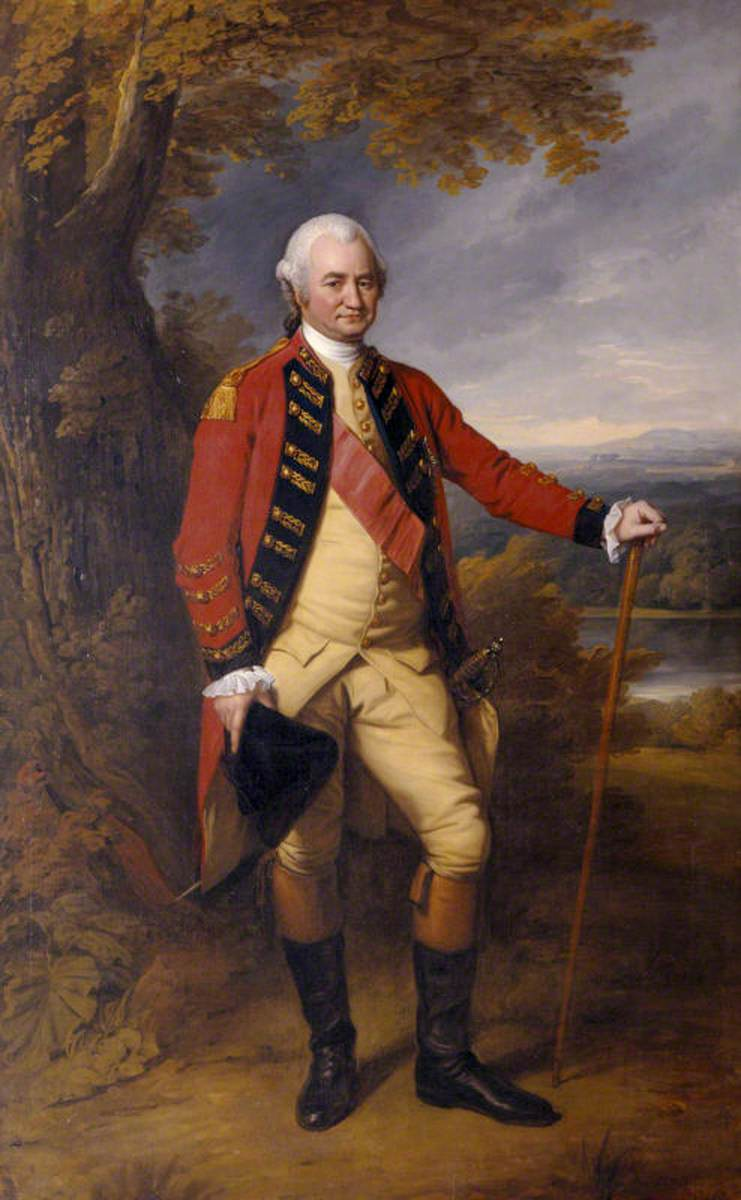
Portrait of Robert Clive by Nathaniel Dance-Holland, 1770

=== Robert Clive ===
Nearby at Styche Hall is the birthplace of Robert Clive, first Baron Clive, "Clive of India", (1725–1774), part of whose schooling was in the Grammar School then in Market Drayton.

The Georgian house, designed by Sir William Chambers, the architect of Somerset House, replaced the half-timbered house where Clive was born. It was built for his father and paid for by Clive from the income from his Indian career.

== Twin towns ==
Market Drayton is twinned with:

- Arlon, Belgium
- Pézenas, France

== Gallery ==
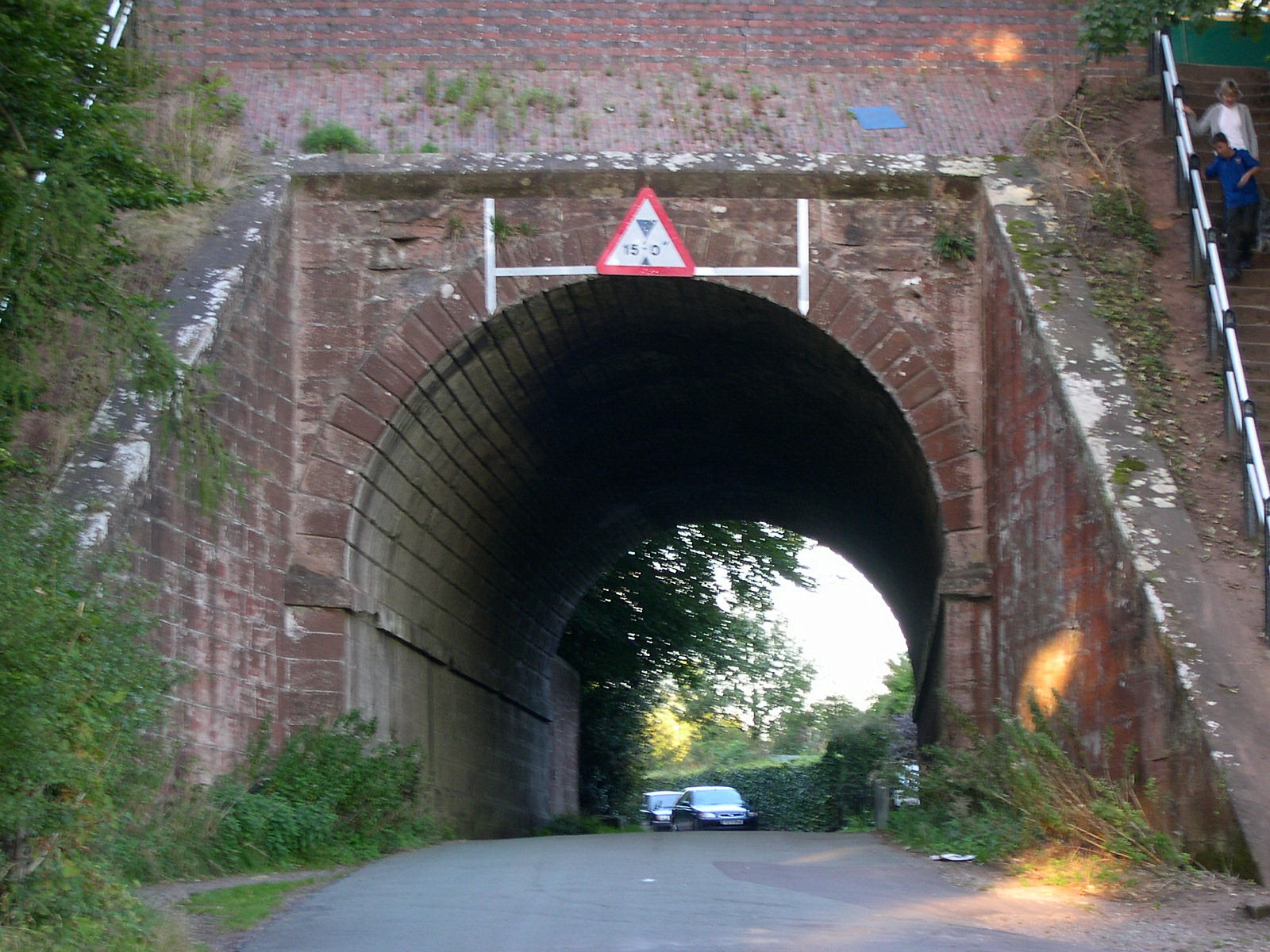
Aqueduct

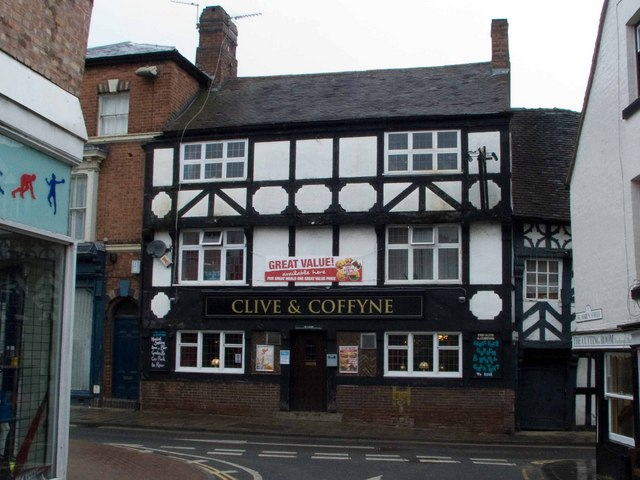
Clive and Coffyne, Shropshire Street

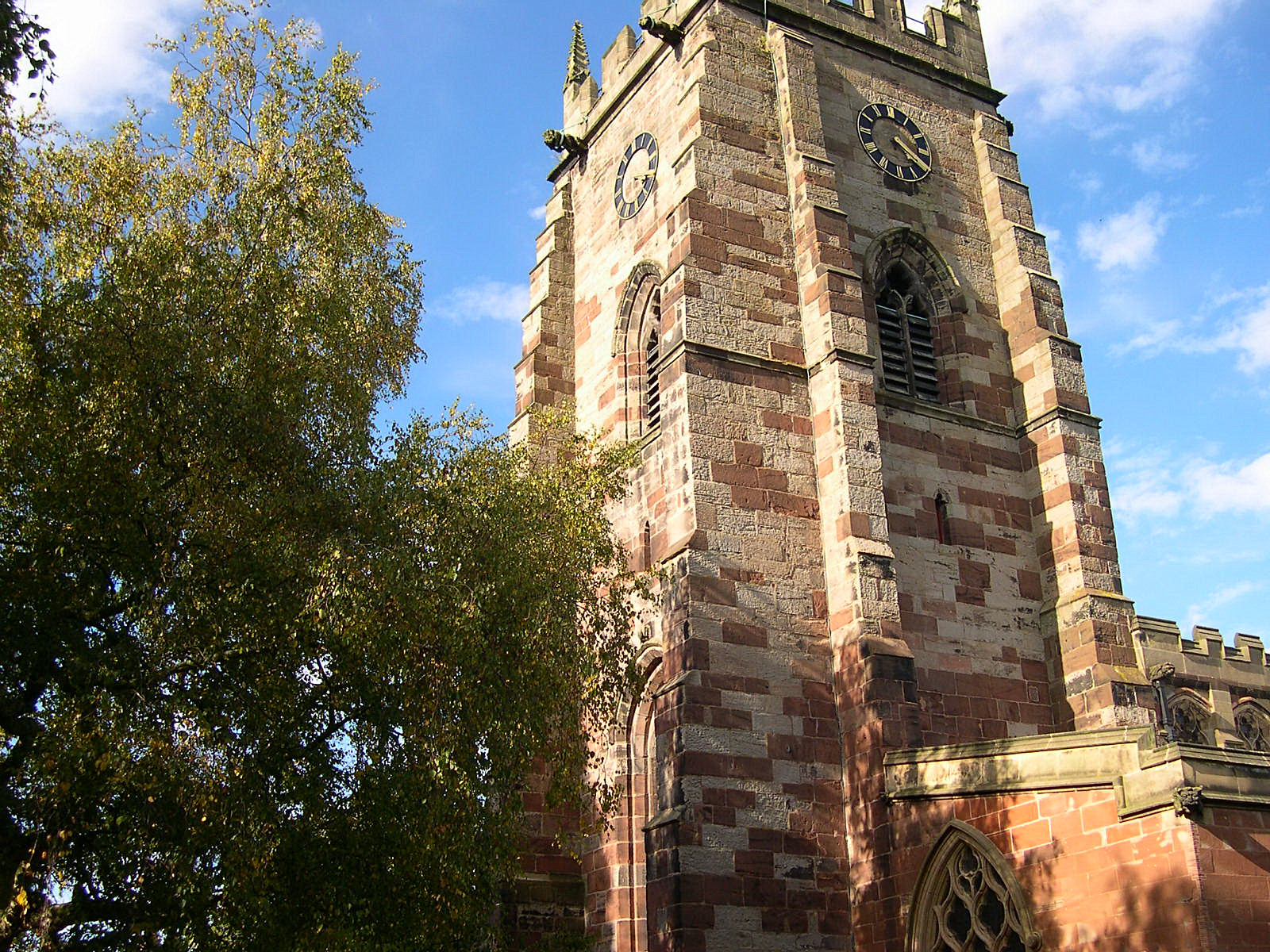
St Mary's Church

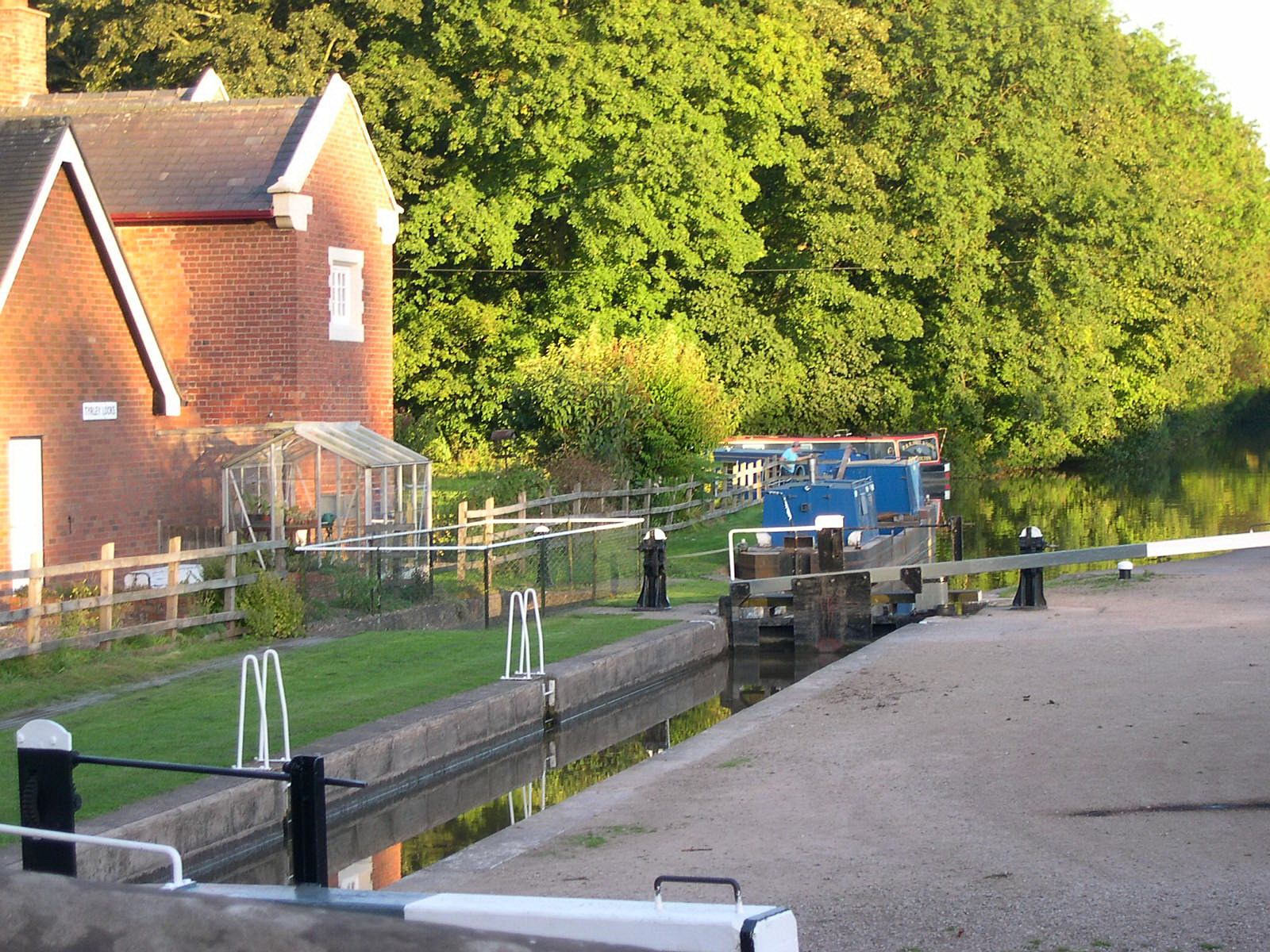
Tyrley Locks

== See also ==
- Listed buildings in Market Drayton
