= Listed buildings in Market Drayton =

Market Drayton is a town and a civil parish in Shropshire, England. It contains 80 listed buildings that are recorded in the National Heritage List for England. Of these, four are at Grade II*, the middle of the three grades, and the others are at Grade II, the lowest grade. Most of the listed buildings are grouped around the town centre, and many of them are houses, shops or public houses that are timber framed, or have a timber-framed core. Other types of listed buildings include churches, memorials and other structures in a churchyard, restaurants and cafés, hotels, a former grammar school and schoolmaster's house, mills, bridges, a war memorial, and a pillbox.

== Key ==
Grade	Criteria
II*	Particularly important buildings of more than special interest
II	Buildings of national importance and special interest

== Buildings ==
Name and location	Photograph	Date	Notes	Grade
St Mary's Church; 52.90315°N 2.48338°W		14th century	The oldest substantial part of the church is the west tower, there is a reset Norman west doorway, and the rest of the church was rebuilt in 1881–84 by Carpenter and Ingelow, who also restored it in 1885–89. The church is built mainly in red sandstone with some grey sandstone in the tower, and consists of a nave with a clerestory, north and south aisles, a chancel with a north vestry, and a west tower. The tower has three stages, angle buttresses, a northwest canted stair turret that has a pyramidal cap and a finial, a three-light west window, clock faces on all sides, gargoyles, an embattled parapet with crocketed corner pinnacles, and a weathervane. The nave and chancel have embattled parapets, and at the east end of the nave is a square bellcote with a crocketed canopy and a finial.	II*
Churchyard retaining wall 52.90336°N 2.48285°W	—	Late medieval	The wall, which was extended in the 20th century, is at the north end of the churchyard of St Mary's Church, and behind 6–10 Great Hales Street. It is in red sandstone with a brick top stage, and two buttresses with chamfered tops. The wall is about 20 metres (66 ft) long.	II
Sundial; 52.90339°N 2.48313°W	—	14th or 15th century (probable)	Originally a churchyard cross, the shaft has been replaced by a sundial, it is in grey sandstone, and is in the churchyard of St Mary's Church. There is a base of four octagonal stone steps on which is a shaft in the form of a column with a splayed base and a moulded capital. On the top is a copper dial and a gnomon. The dial carries an inscription and there is an inscribed plate on the base of the shaft.	II
Townsend House; 52.90326°N 2.48090°W	—	15th century	Cross-wings were added to the house in the 16th century, it was altered in the 18th century, extended in about 1870, and remodelled in about 1906–07. The original part is timber framed with plaster infill on a sandstone plinth. It was rendered and extended in brick at the rear, and the front was refaced and rebuilt in red brick on a blue brick plinth with sandstone dressings. The roofs are tiled, there are two storeys and a basement, and an H-shaped plan. The timber-framed part has a jettied upper storey with an ornamental bressumer. On the front are four gables with decorative and pierced bargeboards and finials, and a doorway with a moulded architrave, and a round-arched surround. To the left is a full-height canted bay window, and the other windows are sashes.	II
Cotton's House; 52.90245°N 2.48626°W		c. 1600	The house, which was later altered, is timber framed on a chamfered grey sandstone plinth, party encased in rendered brick, extended or refaced in red brick at the rear, and has a tile roof. There are two storeys, an attic and basement, and an E-shaped plan, with two bays facing the roads, the left bay gabled, and sides of three bays. The windows are a mixture of casements and sashes, some of the latter being horizontally-sliding. The doorway in the right return has a gabled porch, a moulded architrave, and a fanlight, and at the rear is a gabled eaves dormer.	II*
9 Shropshire Street; 52.90368°N 2.48412°W	—	Late 16th or early 17th century	A house, later a shop, it was remodelled in the 19th century. It is timber framed with rendered infill, and has a tile roof. There are two storeys and an attic and one bay. The upper floor and attic are jettied. In the ground floor is an early 19th-century shop front, the upper floor contains a sash window, and above is gabled eaves dormer with a finial.	II
18 and 20 Cheshire Street; 52.90421°N 2.48429°W	—	Early 17th century	The house, later a shop, was altered in about 1900. It is timber framed with plaster infill, partly rebuilt and underbuilt in red brick, and with a tile roof. There are two storeys and an attic, and two bays. The upper floor was formerly jettied, and there is a moulded and carved bressumer. The right gable end is slightly jettied and the gable has plain bargeboards. In the ground floor are 19th- and 20th-century shop fronts, and the windows above are casements.	II
24 High Street; 52.90415°N 2.48413°W	—	Early 17th century	A house, later a shop, it was remodelled in about 1900. It is timber framed with red brick nogging, it has been refronted with applied timber framing, and the roof is tiled. There are two storeys and an attic, and two bays. In the ground floor is a projecting shop front with plate glass windows flanking a central doorway. The upper floor contains a canted bay window, and the attic is jettied and gabled, with bargeboards and a finial, and it contains a casement window.	II
25 High Street; 52.90417°N 2.48420°W	—	Early 17th century	A house, later a shop, it has been refaced and partly rebuilt in brick, and has a tile roof. There are two storeys and an attic, and two bays. In the ground floor is a projecting shop front with plate glass windows, and the upper floor contains a casement window. The attic is jettied with a moulded bressumer, and a gable with bargeboards.	II
15 and 15A Shropshire Street; 52.90361°N 2.48420°W	—	Early 17th century	A house later used for other purposes, it was remodelled in the early 19th century. It has a timber framed core encased in brick, and a tile roof. There are two storeys and an attic, and a front of one bay. In the ground floor is a 19th-century shop front with a doorway at an angle on the corner. In the upper floor is a casement window, and above is a large gabled eaves dormer. The gable end contains a doorway with a small shop front to the right, and sash windows above. Inside the building is much surviving timber framing.	II
27 Shropshire Street; 52.90334°N 2.48467°W		Early to mid 17th century	A house, later a restaurant, it is timber framed with brick and plaster infill on a sandstone plinth, partly rebuilt in brick, and with a tile roof. It has three bays at right angles to the road, one storey and an attic. The front facing the road is gabled with shaped bargeboards, and it contains a canted oriel window. Along the sides are gabled eaves dormers.	II
30 Cheshire Street; 52.90446°N 2.48471°W	—	Mid 17th century	A house, later a shop, it was extended to the rear in the 18th century, and partly rebuilt in the 19th century. It is timber framed with brick nogging on a brick plinth, it was rebuilt and extended in red brick and rendered on the front, and has a tile roof, hipped at the front. The building is mainly at right angles to the street, and on the front is a shop front in the ground floor and sash windows above.	II
17–21 Christ Church Lane; 52.89792°N 2.50074°W	—	17th century	A cottage that was extended in the 18th century, the original one-bay part is timber framed and rendered, and the two-bay extension is in brick, partly rendered. The roof is tiled, there is one storey and attics, and there are flanking one-storey lean-tos on the sides. On the front are two gabled porches, the windows are casements, and there are three gabled eaves dormers.	II
6 Church Street; 52.90350°N 2.48349°W	—	17th century	The house, which was remodelled in the 18th century, is timber framed with brick nogging, rendered at the front, and exposed at the rear. There is a tile roof, one storey and an attic, two bays, and a single-storey lean-to at the rear. The door to the left has a rectangular fanlight and a bracketed hood, the windows are sashes, and there are two gabled half-dormers with decorative bargeboards and finials.	II
6 and 8 Great Hales Street; 52.90335°N 2.48262°W	—	Mid 17th century	A house, later a pair of shops, it was altered and extended in the 18th and 19th centuries. It is timber framed with brick nogging, and partly rebuilt in brick, which is partly rendered, and the roof is tiled. It is partly in one storey with an attic, and partly in two storeys. In the ground floor are shop fronts, above are casement windows, and there are two gabled half-dormers. At the rear is a brick wing and some exposed timber framing.	II
19 and 21 Great Hales Street; 52.90329°N 2.48160°W	—	Mid 17th century	A timber framed house with brick nogging on a plinth of brick and sandstone, and with a tile roof. There are two storeys and a basement, and three bays. On the front to the right, steps lead up to a gabled porch, and to the right of this is a canted bay window with a hipped roof. To the left are two casement windows, a basement window, and another doorway. In the upper floor are two oriel windows on brackets.	II
17 and 17A High Street; 52.90379°N 2.48362°W	—	17th century (probable)	A house, later an inn, then a pair of shops, it was remodelled in the 18th century. It has a timber framed core, and is rendered with a moulded eaves cornice, and has a tile roof. There are two storeys, four bays, and two gabled rear wings. In the ground floor are two 20th-century shop fronts, and to the left is a door to a passageway. In the upper floor are sash windows, and above are two dormers, one gabled, and the other with a hipped roof. Inside is substantial surviving timber framing.	II
51 Shropshire Street; 52.90264°N 2.48600°W	—	17th century	A house, later a public house, it was remodelled in the 19th century. It is in red brick with a tile roof and a large gable to the right. In the ground floor are two flat-roofed bay windows flanking a doorway with a flat hood on scrolled brackets. In the gable are two sash windows, and to the left is a gabled eaves dormer with a casement window.	II
53 Shropshire Street; 52.90258°N 2.48614°W	—	17th century (probable)	A house, later a shop, it was partly rebuilt in the 18th century. It is basically timber framed on a plinth, and is partly rebuilt in brick with a plat band, and has a tile roof. There is one storey and an attic, one bay, and a rear wing. In the ground floor is a shop front, and to the right is a sash window, and a carriageway. Above is a gabled eaves dormer.	II
3 and 5 St Mary's Street; 52.90351°N 2.48410°W	—	Mid 17th century	The oldest part is the rear wing, the front range being added in the 19th century. The rear range is timber framed with brick nogging, the front range is in red brick, and the roof is tiled. There are two storeys, and a front range of three bays. In the ground floor are 19th-century shop fronts with three square flat-roofed bay windows, each with a fascia and a cornice. Between the two right bay windows is a doorway with reeded pilaster strps and a blind fanlight.	II
9 and 7A (part) St Mary's Street; 52.90335°N 2.48381°W	—	Mid 17th century	A house that was remodelled in the 19th century, and partly divided, it has a timber framed core encased in red brick, and a tile roof. There is an L-shaped plan, the main range has two bays, one storey and an attic, and the rear wing has two storeys. The main range has a plinth, a dentil eaves cornice, and two gabled half-dormers. In the ground floor is a central segmental-headed doorway with a gabled porch, to the right is a casement window, and to the left a former shop front with reeded pilasters, a frieze, and a moulded cornice. In the left gable end is a shop front and doorway with pilasters and a continuous frieze and cornice.	II
14 and 16 Stafford Street; 52.90463°N 2.48322°W	—	17th century	A pair of houses, later shops with living accommodation, they were altered in the 19th century. The building is timber framed and rendered with a tile roof. There are two storeys and attics, and three bays. In the ground floor are 19th-century shop fronts with pilastered surrounds, fascias, and cornices on carved scrolled brackets. In the upper floor, from the left is a cross-window, a flat-roofed canted bay window, and a casement window, and above is a small gabled eaves dormer.	II
Crown Hotel and former brewery 52.90440°N 2.48397°W		Mid 17th century	The earlier part is a house, later a public house, which was later extended and altered, with the brewery at the rear dating from the 19th century. The public house is timber framed with brick and plaster infill on a brick plinth, with some refacing and rebuilding in brick, a rendered gable, and tiled roofs. It has an L-shaped plan, with a short main range with two storeys, an attic and a basement, and a larger gabled cross-wing to the left with two storeys and three bays. The upper storey is jettied with a moulded bressumer. Most of the windows are casements. The brewery is in red brick with a tile roof, two storeys and a loft, and contains sash windows.	II
Badgers Court; 52.90292°N 2.48561°W	—	1651	A house, later divided into two, it was altered in the 19th and 21st centuries. It is timber framed with plaster infill and a tile roof. There are two storeys, with an L-shaped plan, with a front of two bays, and a rear wing. The windows on the front are mullioned.	II
The Sandbrook Vaults; 52.90371°N 2.48433°W		1653	The public house is timber framed with plaster infill on a rendered plinth. There are two storeys and an attic, and three bays. The upper storey and attic are jettied with carved bressumers on carved brackets. Some of the windows are casements, some are small-paned, and there are two full dormers with rendered gables. To the left is a passageway with brick nogging and a sandstone plinth.	II
Tudor House Restaurant; 52.90377°N 2.48426°W		1653	Originally two houses on a corner site, later used for other purposes, it was restored in 1962. The building is timber framed with plaster infill, the ground floor was rebuilt in sandstone, and the gable end is rendered. There are two storeys and an attic, seven bays on Shropshire Street, and four on Cheshire Street. The upper storey and attics are jettied with moulded and carved bressumers. Some windows are casements, and some are sashes, and there are gabled eaves dormers on both fronts.	II*
10 Church Street; 52.90337°N 2.48370°W	—	1654	The house, which was at one time an inn, and then a shop, was remodelled in the 18th century. The original part is timber framed, the eaves have been raised in brick, and it is rendered. The house has a band, a dentilled cornice, and a tile roof. There are two storeys and two bays. Steps with handrails lead up to a central doorway with a bracketed gabled porch. To the left is a former shop window in the form of a canted bay window, under which is a basement door, and to the right is a smaller canted bay window and a passage doorway. In the upper floor are sash windows.	II
Tudor Café; 52.90468°N 2.48348°W	—	Mid to late 17th century	A house, later a café, it was altered and extended in the 18th century. It is timber framed with plaster infill, partly rendered on a sandstone plinth, partly refaced and rebuilt in red brick, and with a tile roof. There is one storey and an attic, and two or three bays at right angles to the road. On the front is a doorway with reeded pilasters, a frieze and a cornice, and there are two casement windows. In the right return is a gabled eaves dormer. The 18th-century extension has a dentil eaves cornice, and a dormer.	II
The Salopian Star; 52.90487°N 2.48301°W		1669	A house, later a public house, it was altered and extended later. It is timber framed with plaster and brick infill, pebbledashed on the right return, with applied timber framing to the front and some underbuilding in brick, and a tile roof. There are two storeys, an attic and a basement, and an L-shaped plan, with a four-bay main block and a later two-storey rear wing. On the front are two gables, and a projecting gabled two-storey porch approached by two flights of steps behind a brick wall. The upper floor and attics are slightly jettied, and the windows are casements. The rear wing is in brick, and contains sash windows.	II
Kings Arms; 52.90269°N 2.48591°W		1674	A house, later a public house, it was altered in about 1900. It is timber framed with brick and plaster infill, the front has been refaced with applied timber framing, and it has a tile roof. There is one storey and an attic, and the attic is jettied with moulded bressumers. There are three gabled half-dormers and a two-storey gabled porch. The windows are casements.	II
The Old House; 52.90296°N 2.48542°W		Late 17th century	The house was extended to the rear in the late 18th century. It is in red brick on a plinth, and has a plat band, a moulded eaves cornice, and a tile roof with parapeted gable ends. There are two storeys, and attic and a basement, a front of five bays, the middle bay projecting forward, and a three-storey rear wing. A flight of seven semicircular grey sandstone steps leads up to the central doorway that has fluted pilasters, a radial fanlight, an entablature, and a triangular pediment. The windows are sashes. In the attic are two dormers with triangular pedimented gables, flanking a central circular parapeted gable containing a sash window.	II*
Saint Mary's Hall and The Old Grammar School; 52.90314°N 2.48273°W		c. 1700	A grammar school and schoolmaster's house, later two houses, they are in brick with tile roofs. The school is in one and two storeys with an attic, and the house to the south has two and three storeys and an attic. Some windows are casements, some are sashes and each part has hipped eaves dormers. The house has two doorways with moulded architraves. Inside the schoolroom is a bust of Rowland Hill in a niche.	II
14 (Rylands House), 16 and 16A Great Hales Street; 52.90319°N 2.48207°W	—	Early 18th century	The house was later extended. It is in brick with sandstone dressings, the sides and rear are rendered, and the hipped roof is tiled. The original house has two storeys, an attic and a basement, and three bays. There is a plinth, a belt course above the ground floor, a frieze and a modillion cornice above the upper floor, and a dentil eaves cornice above the attic. The central doorway has pilasters, a moulded architrave, a frieze, and a segmental pediment on consoles. The windows are sashes; the window above the doorway has a flat head and a keystone, the other windows in the lower floors have depressed arch heads, and in the attic they are smaller with flat heads. Nos. 16 and 16A to the left has two storeys and three bays, a doorway to the left, and sash windows.	II
14 High Street and 2 Church Street; 52.90360°N 2.48335°W	—	Early 18th century	A house, later a shop, with a 17th-century core, that was altered in the 19th century. It is in red brick with sandstone dressings on a moulded stone plinth, with a dentil cornice, a parapet with red sandstone coping, and a tile roof. There are two storeys and an attic, and an L-shaped plan, with a front of two bays and a rear wing. Steps lead up to a central doorway with a panelled surround, to the right is a 19th-century canted shop front, and to the left is a casement window. In the upper floor are sash windows and there is a pair of dormers.	II
Poynton House; 52.90290°N 2.48599°W		Early 18th century	The house, which was altered in 1753, is in red brick with sandstone dressings, a chamfered plinth, chamfered quoins, a sill band, a frieze, a moulded cornice, and a coped parapet. There are two storeys and an attic, and five bays. The central doorway is approached by three steps, and has a moulded architrave, pilaster strips, a fanlight, a triple keystone, and a triangular pediment on consoles. The windows are sashes with raised keystones. At the rear is a two-storey wing with three gables, containing a full-height bay window.	II
Red House Cottage; 52.90316°N 2.48515°W	—	Early 18th century	The house, which has a 17th-century core, was remodelled in the early 19th century. It is in rendered brick on a moulded sandstone plinth, and has a tile roof. There are two storeys and an attic, two bays, and two gabled wings at the rear. Steps lead up to the central doorway that has panelled pilaster strips, a moulded architrave, and a triangular pedimented hood on shaped brackets with guttae. The windows are sashes, and there are two dormers with hipped roofs. In front of the house are two areas enclosed by low sandstone walls.	II
Old George Chambers; 52.90364°N 2.48306°W	—	Early to mid 18th century (probable)	A house, later an inn, then a shop and offices, it was later altered and extended. The building probably has a timber framed core, the additions are in red sandstone and brick, it is rendered, and the roof is tiled. It has a front range of two bays, a gabled cross-wing on the left, and a later brick wing at the rear. The two-bay range has two storeys, and the wings have two storeys and attics. On the front the ground floor has large plate glass shop windows and a recessed porch, and in the upper floor are sash windows.	II
71 Stafford Street; 52.90596°N 2.47925°W	—	Mid 18th century	A red brick house with a coved eaves cornice, and a tile roof that has a left gable with a parapet and sandstone cpoping. There are two storeys and an attic, and two bays. The doorway on the left has a Gothick porch, an architrave, a Gothick three-part fanlight, an arcaded frieze, and a moulded cornice. To the right is a canted bay window, in the upper floor are sash windows, and above is an eaves dormer with a hipped roof. The left gable end contains an oculus.	II
Churchyard gates and piers 52.90323°N 2.48379°W	—	18th century	The gates and gate piers are at the west entrance to the churchyard of St Mary's Church. The piers are in rusticated grey sandstone, and each pier has a chamfered plinth, a moulded cornice, and an onion-shaped cap with an ovoid finial. Between the piers is a wrought iron overthrow, and the gates, also in wrought iron, have railings with fleur-de-lis heads.	II
Hesketh House; 52.90317°N 2.48180°W	—	Mid 18th century	A red brick house on a plinth, with a dentil eaves cornice, and a tile roof. There are three storeys and a basement, and three bays. The doorway to the right has a moulded architrave, fluted pilasters, a fanlight with intersecting Gothic tracery, a frieze, and a projecting flat cornice on shaped brackets. To the left is a round-headed passageway door, and the windows are sashes.	II
The Red House; 52.90325°N 2.48496°W		Mid 18th century	The house was extended in about 1900, and has been divided into flats. It is in Georgian style, and is in red brick with sandstone dressings on a stone plinth with brick quoins, a cill band, a moulded cornice, a parapet with stone coping, and a tile roof. There are three storeys, and a front of seven bays, and a later recessed single-bay wing on the left. The middle three bays project under a triangular pediment. Steps lead up to the central doorway that has three-quarter Ionic columns, a moulded architrave, an entablature, and a triangular pediment. The windows are sashes with rusticated lintels and raised keystones.	II
1 Church Street and milestone 52.90354°N 2.48315°W	—	Mid to late 18th century	A house, later a shop at right angles to the street, it is in red brick with sandstone dressings on a chamfered stone plinth, with a plat band, chamfered quoins, and a tile roof with parapeted coped gables. There are two storeys, an attic and a basement, and a front of two bays. In the ground floor is a 20th-century shop front, and above are sash windows. The returns have two bays, and in the right return are two gabled dormers with decorative bargeboards. To the right is a chamfered stone milestone with an illegible inscription.	II
4 Church Street; 52.90354°N 2.48343°W	—	Mid to late 18th century	The house incorporates earlier timber framing, and is in red brick with a tile roof. There are two storeys, two bays, and a single-storey lean-to at the rear. The windows are casements with segmental heads, and the rear wall is timber framed.	II
9 High Street; 52.90381°N 2.48328°W	—	Mid to late 18th century	A house, later a shop, it is in red brick on a plinth, with a plat band, a moulded eaves cornice, and a tile roof. There are two storeys and an attic, and four bays. In the ground floor is a shop front with a central door, and a fascia and cornice above, and to the left is a doorway with an inscribed fanlight. In the upper floor are sash windows, and above are two hipped dormers containing horizontally-sliding sashes.	II
55 Shropshire Street; 52.90253°N 2.48620°W	—	Mid to late 18th century	A cottage, later a shop, it is in red brick, rendered and the front, and is a right angles to the road. It has a tile roof with parapeted gable ends, and facing the road there is stone coping. There is one storey and an attic, and a shop front.	II
Brooklyn House; 52.90582°N 2.47879°W	—	Mid to late 18th century	A red brick house, the right gable end rendered, with a plat band, a dentil eaves cornice, and a two-span tile roof. There are two storeys and an attic, a double-depth plan, and a front of five bays. The doorway has pilasters, a moulded architrave, a rusticated surround, a semicircular fanlight with intersecting Gothic tracery, and an open triangular pediment on shaped consoles. The windows are sashes with rusticated lintels and keystones. Flanking the entrance are short segments of railings.	II
St. Martha's Cottage and St. Mary's Cottage; 52.90315°N 2.48158°W	—	Mid to late 18th century	A pair of brick houses on a plinth, the left side rendered, with a band, and a tile roof with parapeted gable ends. There are two storeys and attics, and each house has two bays. Both houses have sash windows, those in the ground floor with segmental heads. St. Mary's Cottage has a gabled lattice porch and two gabled dormers.	II
The Grove; 52.90616°N 2.47629°W	—	c. 1770	A house, later part of a school, it is in red brick with dressings in orange brick, on a rendered plinth, with a storey band, and a modillion cornice, a coped parapet, and a hipped tile roof. There are two storeys and an attic, and a double-pile cruciform plan. The ends of the east and west wings are canted, the south front has a three-bay bow window, and the north front, which faces the road, has two bays. The doorway has three-quarter Doric columns and a broken pediment. In the upper storey of the bow is a Venetian window with Doric pilasters and an entablature, and the other windows are sashes.	II
Stable block, The Grove; 52.90658°N 2.47545°W	—	c. 1770	The stable block to the northeast of the house is in red brick with a dentil eaves cornice and a hipped tile roof. There are two storeys and a U-shaped plan. The main range has six bays, the central four bays projecting forward under a pedimented gable with a circular clock face in the tympanum. The central two bays contain round-arched windows with lunettes above, and the other windows are cross-windows. On the roof is a square wooden cupola with round arches and an ogee lead dome with a globe finial and a weathervane.	II
15 High Street; 52.90366°N 2.48345°W	—	Late 18th century	A house, later a shop and offices, it is in brick with sandstone dressings, quoin strips, a moulded stone eaves cornice, and a tile roof with a parapeted gable end on the right. There are three storeys, two bays, and a later gabled rear wing. In the ground floor are plate glass shop windows flanking a recessed doorway, in the middle floor are Venetian windows with a moulded architrave and an entablature, and in the top floor are sash windows with moulded architraves.	II
Beech Tree House; 52.90222°N 2.48872°W	—	Late 18th century	A red brick house with a dentil eaves cornice and a hipped tile roof. There are two storeys and an attic, three bays, and a lower two-storey wing recessed to the right. The central doorway has Doric unfluted pilasters, a wreathed fanlight, an entablature and an open triangular pediment. The windows are sashes with stone cills and lintels with keystones, and there are two dormers with hipped roofs and tile-hung sides.	II
Corbet Arms Hotel; 52.90391°N 2.48341°W		Late 18th century	The hotel was extended by the addition of a block to the left in the early 19th century, and a ballroom at the rear. The building is in red brick with a tile roof. The earlier block has two storeys and an attic, and four bays, sash windows, and two hipped eaves dormers. The later block has three storeys and three bays. On the front is a Tuscan porch with granite columns, a frieze and a triangular pediment, and the double doors have a reeded architrave with paterae, a radial fanlight, a frieze, and a moulded cornice. To the left is a carriageway, the windows in the lower floors are sashes, and in the top floor they are casements.	II
Walkmill Bridge; 52.89825°N 2.48995°W	—	1783	The bridge carries a road over the River Tern. It is in red sandstone and consists of a single elliptical arch. The bridge has voussoirs, keystones, a parapet, and abutments with canted retaining walls.	II
Buntingsdale Hall Bridge; 52.89377°N 2.50951°W	—	1794	The bridge carries a drive to Buntingsdale Hall over the River Tern. It is in sandstone and consists of a single segmental arch. The bridge has voussoirs, raised keystones, one of which is inscribed, a chamfered string course, and a parapet with a chamfered top.	II
39 Shropshire Street; 52.90305°N 2.48540°W	—	c. 1800	A red brick house with a dentil eaves cornice, and a tile roof. It has three storeys and a basement, and three bays. Three steps lead up to the central doorway that has fluted pilasters with ornamental capitals, a radial fanlight, a frieze, an entablature, and a triangular pediment. The windows are sash windows, and there is a segmental-headed basement window.	II
Drayton House; 52.90344°N 2.48401°W	—	c. 1800	A red brick house with a rendered plinth, plat bands, and a tile roof with parapeted gable ends. There are two storeys, a basement and an attic, and three bays. Three steps with wrought iron railings lead up to a central doorway with a reeded architrave and a flat hood, and to the left is a segmental-headed doorway. The windows are sashes, and the window above the doorway is blind.	II
36 and 38 Stafford Street; 52.90520°N 2.48130°W	—	Late 18th or early 19th century	A house, possibly two houses partly truncated to make a house and a shop. It is in red brick on a plinth, with a plat band, a dentil eaves cornice, and a tile roof. There are three storeys, and an L-shaped plan, with a front of three bays, and a two-storey rear wing. Three steps with a handrail lead up to the doorway, which has a moulded architrave and a triangular pedimented hood. The windows are sashes, and to the right is a blocked depressed arch with an inserted window.	II
The Red Lion; 52.90349°N 2.48246°W		Late 18th or early 19th century	A house, later a public house, it is in red brick with a plat band, a dentil eaves cornice, and a tile roof. There are three storeys and three bays. The doorway has pilasters, an impost band, a blind round-arched tympanum, an entablature, and an open triangular pediment. The windows are sashes, and the windows above the doorway are blind.	II
Haslam memorial 52.90294°N 2.48343°W	—	1823	The monument is in the churchyard of St Mary's Church, and is to the memory of Joseph Haslem and his wife. It is a pedestal tomb in grey sandstone, and has a moulded plinth, raised side panels, corner piers, a fluted frieze, a moulded cornice, and a shallow pyramidal top. Surrounding the memorial is a low wall.	II
The Butter Market; 52.90423°N 2.48450°W		1824	An open market hall consisting of monolithic unfluted Tuscan grey sandstone columns carrying a slate roof. It has sides of four and three bays, and triangular pedimented gable ends. In the centre of the roof is a square wooden bellcote with a pyramidal cap and containing two copper bells.	II
9 Great Hales Street; 52.90345°N 2.48234°W	—	Early 19th century	A house, later offices, in red brick, the ground floor and gable end rendered, with a dentil eaves cornice, and a tile roof. There are three storeys and three bays. In the ground floor is an inserted casement window and a canted bay window to the right, and the other windows are sashes. In the right return is a doorway that has reeded pilaster strips, an architrave, paterae, and a moulded cornice.	II
3 Shrewsbury Road; 52.90190°N 2.48967°W	—	Early 19th century	A red brick house on a plinth, with a dentil eaves cornice and a hipped tile roof. There are two storeys, three bays, and flanking recessed one-storey wings. The central doorway has a moulded architrave, reeded pilasters, an entablature, and a triangular pediment. Above the doorway is an oval panel, and the windows are sashes.	II
30 Shropshire Street; 52.90313°N 2.48562°W	—	Early 19th century	A red brick house with sandstone dressings, a plat band, a dentil eaves cornice, and a tile roof with parapeted gable ends and sandstone copings. There are two storeys, an attic and a basement, and an L-shaped plan with a front of three bays, and a rear wing. The central bay projects and is surmounted by a triangular pediment with a frieze and a cornice. Four stone steps lead up to a central doorway that has panelled pilaster strips, an impost band, a radial fanlight, and a triangular pediment. The windows are sashes.	II
1 St Mary's Street; 52.90357°N 2.48416°W	—	Early 19th century	A brick shop with a dentil eaves cornice, a tile roof, two storeys and an attic, and two bays. In the ground floor are two square shop bay windows, each with a rendered base, a frieze and a cornice. Between them is a doorway with a moulded architrave and a triangular pediment. In the upper floor are sash windows, and above are two gabled eaves dormers.	II
35 Stafford Street; 52.90512°N 2.48238°W	—	Early 19th century	The house, which incorporates a 17th-century core, is in red brick with stone dressings, a dentil eaves cornice, and a tile roof. There are two storeys, an attic and a basement, and three bays, the middle bay projecting with a parapeted gable. In the centre is a projecting Tuscan porch with a frieze, a moulded cornice, and a cast iron balcony. The doorway has a rectangular fanlight, and the windows are sashes.	II
73 Stafford Street; 52.90595°N 2.47910°W	—	Early 19th century	A red brick house on a rendered plinth, the right gable end rendered, with a dentil eaves cornice, and a tile roof. There are two storeys and an attic, and three bays. The central doorway has pilasters, a radial fanlight, a frieze, and a triangular pediment, and above it is a round-headed window. The other windows are sashes, and there are two gabled eaves dormers.	II
Church House; 52.90282°N 2.48569°W	—	Early 19th century	The house is in red brick with a dentil eaves cornice and a tile roof with parapeted gable ends and sandstone copings. There are three storeys and two bays, a two-storey one-bay wing to the right, and a parallel gabled rear wing. Three steps lead up to the doorway that has fluted pilasters, an entablature, and a triangular pediment. The windows are sashes.	II
Coach and Horses; 52.90217°N 2.48775°W		Early 19th century	A house, later a public house, it is in red brick with a dentil eaves cornice and a tile roof. There are three storeys and two bays. The central doorway has a moulded architrave, a frieze with reeded end sections, a moulded cornice, and a triangular pediment. In the ground floor are bow windows with fluted pilasters, a frieze, and a moulded cornice, and the other windows are sashes.	II
Shifford's Bridge; 52.91036°N 2.46043°W	—	Early 19th century (probable)	The bridge carries the A53 road over the River Tern. It is in sandstone, and consists of a single wide segmental arch. The bridge has a projecting keystone on the north side, a flat string course, and curved ends on the south side.	II
Bridge No. 63; Betton Road Bridge; 52.90870°N 2.47254°W		c. 1830	The bridge carries Betton Road over the Shropshire Union Canal. It is in red sandstone, and consists of a single elliptical skew arch with a humpback. The bridge has voussoirs, raised keystones, a string course, a parapet, square end piers, and curved abutments.	II
Sandbrook memorial 52.90338°N 2.48302°W	—	1835	The monument is in the churchyard of St Mary's Church, and is to the memory of members of the Sandbrook family. It is a chest tomb in grey sandstone, and is in the form of a Greek Revival sarcophagus. The tomb has a chamfered plinth, end panels with antefixae, a central block with a shallow chamfered top, and raised side panels with festoons beneath.	II
Forge House; 52.90329°N 2.48148°W	—	Early to mid 19th century	Originally two cottages, later one house, it is in brick on a high plinth, and has a tile roof with a parapeted gable on the right. There is one storey and an attic, two bays, and a lower wing recessed on the right. A double flight of stone steps with wrought iron railings leads up to a central doorway that has a porch with a hipped roof on brackets. The windows in the ground floor are sash windows, above are two gabled half-dormers with casements, and in the right wing is a garage door with a segmental head.	II
The Old Vicarage; 52.90237°N 2.48415°W	—	1839–40	The vicarage was refronted later in the century with Gothic detailing. It is in red brick with stone dressings, quoins, a decorative corbel table, and a slate roof. There are two storeys, an attic and a cellar, a front of five bays, and a small rear extension. The doorway has a fluted surround, a semicircular fanlight, and an open pedimented hood. The windows are sashes with Gothic detailing, and there is a dormer window.	II
Christ Church; 52.89872°N 2.50210°W		1845–46	The church was designed by S. Pountney Smith and John Smith, and is in red sandstone with dressings in grey sandstone, and has tile roofs. It consists of a nave, north and south aisles, a south porch, a chancel, north and south vestries, and a west tower. The tower has three stages, string courses, and an embattled coped parapet. To the northwest is an octagonal stair turret rising higher than the tower that has an embattled parapet and a weathervane. The windows are lancets.	II
Beeston memorial 52.90282°N 2.48342°W		1846	The memorial is in the churchyard of St Mary's Church, and is to the memory of William Beeston, a surgeon. It is in grey sandstone, and consists of a pedestal tomb with a canopy. The pedestal has a moulded plinth, recessed side panels, pilaster strips, a moulded cornice, and on the top is an urn. There are four fluted columns with acanthus capitals, and an entablature with a triangular pediment on each face and antefixae on the corners. On the pedestal is an inscription.	II
Church of St Thomas Aquinas and St Stephen Harding and Presbytery; 52.90410°N 2.48023°W		1886	A Roman Catholic church that was designed by Edmund Kirby in Early English style. It is built in cream Wollerton brick with banding and dressings in red Ruabon brick and has a tiled roof with red ridge tiles. The church consists of a nave and a canted sanctuary with an apsidal end, all under one roof, and a porch. The presbytery is attached to the church by a single-storey block containing a sacristy. It has two storeys and a cellar, and two bays. The right bay is gabled with bargeboards, and contains a canted bay window in the ground floor and a segmental headed window above, and the doorway is in the left bay.	II
Drayton Mills; 52.90725°N 2.48774°W	—	1898–99	A former corn mill, it is in brick with a slate roof, and has an L-shaped plan, with a main range and a rear wing on the right. On the front are three storeys and an attic, and six bays separated by pilasters, with a gable above the three bays on the right. It has six-pane windows with top-opening lights and cement lintels, and there is a two-bay carriageway with blue brick jambs. Along the sides and at the rear the windows have segmental heads and are in recessed panels with segmental arches. On the roofs are louvred ventilators, and inside are cast iron columns.	II
117 Cheshire Street; 52.90740°N 2.48804°W		1899	The brewery, later converted for other uses, is in brick with slate roofs, and has a steel frame. There is an L-shaped plan, and the building consists of a main block with two storeys and four bays, a six-storey, three-bay tower with a pyramidal roof to the right, and a rear wing. The bays are divided by brick pilasters, and the windows have segmental heads. In the right bay of the main block is a carriageway with an elliptical stone arch, a scrolled keystone, a cornice, and inscribed spandrels.	II
War memorial 52.90584°N 2.48593°W		1921	The war memorial stands in a garden at a road junction. It is in granite and consists of a cross on a plinth on a three-stepped base. The front of the cross and the shaft are polished, and the sides are rough-hewn, and on the cross are carved wreaths. On the plinth are inscriptions and the names of those lost in the First World War. Behind the cross is a concrete wall, bowed at the ends, which was added after the Second World War, and on the central panel are the names of those lost in that war.	II
Pillbox; 52.90757°N 2.47159°W		1940	The Type 24 pillbox is adjacent to the Shropshire Union Canal. It is in reinforced concrete, on a square concrete plinth, and has a hexagonal plan. Five of the walls contain single openings, and in the sixth is a doorway flanked by rifle loopholes.	II
