= Elizabeth Anne Lewis =

British temperance activist (1843 – 1924)

Elizabeth A. Lewis

Elizabeth Anne Lewis (née Lewis; 1843/48-1924) was a British temperance activist and local missionary. Throughout her life, she was devoted to the moral suasion phase of the temperance movement. She was a vice-president of the British Temperance League, the London Temperance Hospital, the Women's Total Abstinence Union, and the National British Temperance Association. She held the United Kingdom Alliance in high regard.

== Early life and education ==
Elizabeth Anne (or Ann) Lewis was born at Market Drayton, Shropshire, March 10, 1843/48. (Note: According to Cherrington (1928), Elizabeth's year of birth was 1843, while according to Winskill (1898), it was 1848.)

Both of her parents were strong adherents of total abstinence, her father, George Lewis, holding outdoor temperance meetings in his home town on Sunday afternoons, which he addressed from the Shambles Steps. He was generally accompanied by his young daughter, Elizabeth Anne. Mrs. Annie Lewis (died 1892), mother of Mrs. Elizabeth Anne Lewis, was connected with the temperance movement for upwards of 45 years.

She was educated at a private school at Newcastle-under-Lyme.

== Career ==
In 1867, Miss Lewis married her cousin Thomas Lewis (born 1843), of Sandbach. He was a lifelong abstainer, and was a worker in the temperance cause from boyhood. The young couple made their home first at Wigan, and the following year, removed to Blackburn, where Mr. Lewis began business as a coachbuilder. Both husband and wife being accomplished pianists, they frequently gave their services at Band of Hope temperance societies and similar organizations.

Lewis began her active temperance work in 1882, in connection with a Blue Ribbon Mission held in the Exchange Hall, Blackburn. When the Blue Ribbon Mission was over, Lewis, who was afraid that the temperance enthusiasm might die out, formed a mission of her own. She made a house-to-house visitation of the persons who had attended the Blue Ribbon meetings, and, to assist her, hired a temperance missionary, Richard Killshaw. Her mission was announced to open on September 1, 1883, and thousands of temperance tracts, inviting people to come, were distributed at the local mills and factories. To the great disappointment of the promoter, only six persons came to the meeting but she was not disheartened, as all of the six signed the pledge and four of them kept it.

In the course of a few years, Lewis became an effective public speaker, and addressed audiences on temperance in most of the large towns of England and Wales. At first, her mission was called "Mrs. Lewis’s Temperance Mission", but later, the word "Teetotal" was substituted for "Temperance", at the wish of Lewis herself. Her mission grew rapidly, being forced several times to seek new quarters. In 1884, it was located in Spinners Hall, St. Peter Street, where Lewis started a series of Saturday night entertainments as a counter-attraction to the public house musical programs. Regular Sunday meetings, also, were instituted, the first speaker being Dr. Frederic Richard Lees. The first year of the mission produced very good results. At the end of this period, Lewis was invited to lay the foundation-stone of the New Congregational Church at Witton, and nearly 400 reformed alcoholics, many of them Roman Catholics, walked in procession to the site of the new church. In 1889 she sued a local publican for libel. He had alleged that she was in a sexual relationship with her assistant and she believed that this effected both her own and the reputation of her mission. Over £300 was raised by the public to cover her legal fees and she won the case.

The mission remained at Spinners’ Hall till 1891, when it was moved to a new building erected by Mr. Lewis for his wife over his workshops in St. Peter Street. This was called "Lees Hall" after Dr. Frederic Richard Lees, who opened it with a dedicatory address. It is estimated that between one and two thousand people signed a pledge of abstinence every year. Each week there would be alcohol free entertainment at the Lees Hall. Up to 600 people would pay a penny each to see dramas, listen to musicians or hear lectures.

Lewis was the first woman in England to be granted the privilege of addressing prisoners in Lancaster Gaol in 1909.

She was known as the "Temperance Queen", and "The Drunkard's Friend". She received several public pecuniary presents in recognition of her public work. In 1913, when King George V and Queen Mary visited Blackburn, she was presented to them as a representative citizen. For 30 years Lewis conducted her Mission, with a single vacation that did not exceed a fortnight. She was a vice-president of the British Temperance League, the London Temperance Hospital, the Women's Total Abstinence Union, and the National British Temperance Association.

== Death and legacy ==
She died at Blackburn, Lancashire, March 14, 1924. In her will, she left several legacies to the leading temperance organizations of the U.K. On October 24, 1925, a memorial cross, erected on her grave, was unveiled by John Oates, the first man to sign the total-abstinence pledge with Lewis at the Blue Ribbon Mission in 1882. Lewis is included in the ODNB.
