= Berkeley Ormerod =

English soldier, diplomat, and sportsman

Personal information
- Full name: Cyril Berkeley Ormerod
- Born: 3 October 1897; Edmonton, Middlesex, England
- Died: 1 November 1983 (aged 86); Westminster, London, England
- Bowling: Right-arm fast-medium

Domestic team information
- Years: Team
- 1927: Marylebone Cricket Club

Career statistics
Competition	First-class
Matches	1
Runs scored	1
Batting average	–
100s/50s	0/0
Top score	1*
Balls bowled	165
Wickets	3
Bowling average	33.66
5 wickets in innings	0
10 wickets in match	0
Best bowling	2/56
Catches/stumpings	0/–
- Source: Cricinfo, 13 April 2012

Major Sir Cyril Berkeley Ormerod KBE (3 October 1897 – 1 November 1983) was an English soldier, diplomat and sportsman.

== Life and career ==
Berkeley Ormerod was born in Edmonton, Middlesex, and educated at St Paul's School, London.

He served in World War I, fighting at Arras and Ypres. He ended the war with the rank of major. He joined the London Stock Exchange in 1927 and became a financial columnist.

An opening bowler, he played cricket for Oxfordshire, representing them in a two-day match against the touring Indians in 1932, taking four wickets. He played one first-class cricket match, for Marylebone Cricket Club against Wales at Lord's in 1927. He also played golf; in 1924 he was Army Golf Champion.

In World War II he was financial adviser for British Information Services in New York. He set up the office of Director of Public Relations in New York and occupied the position from 1945. He accompanied Queen Elizabeth and Prince Philip on their visit to the United States in 1957.

He married Beatrice Sigrist, widow of the aircraft designer Frederick Sigrist, at St George's, Hanover Square in 1962. (Note: General Record Office: Marriages Jun 1962, Ormerod Cyril B and Sigrist Beatrice widow, St George Hanover Square 5c 462) She died in 1981.
