= Betty Bagby Lewis =

American writer

- Born: 1925; Fresno, California, U.S.
- Died: November 5, 2008; Watsonville, California, U.S.
- Occupation(s): Local historian, newspaper columnist, writer

Betty Bagby Lewis (1925 – November 5, 2008) was a local historian and newspaper columnist based in Watsonville, California.

== Early life and education ==
Bagby was born in Fresno and raised in Santa Cruz, California. Her father was a banker. She attended Salinas Junior College.

== Career ==
Lewis started writing historical articles for the Watsonville Register Pajaronian in 1974. Her weekly column titled "That Was Watsonville" appeared every Thursday evening She has also written articles for the Santa Cruz Sentinel, The Salinas Californian and various other publications. She also recorded audio essays and appeared on radio programs. Her research projects were sometimes funded with grants from the Sourisseau Academy for State and Local History, which is based at San Jose State University. She was one of the founders of the Pajaro Valley Historical Association.

Lewis's work in local history was recognized by her community in various ways. She was Grand Marshal of Watsonville's Fourth of July parade in 1977. She was named Woman of the Year by the Watsonville Chamber of Commerce in 1987. The City of Watsonville named her the official City Historian in 2005. The Santa Cruz Museum of Art and History named her Historian of the Year in 2008.

== Books ==
As a weekly columnist, Lewis wrote many articles, and nine books, including these:

- Victorian Homes of Watsonville (1974, revised 1981)
- Walking and Driving Tour of Watsonville (1974)
- Highlights in the History of Watsonville (1975)
- Watsonville Memories That Linger (1976)
- Monterey Bay Yesterday (1977)
- W. H. Weeks, Architect (1985)
- Holy City, Santa Cruz Mountains (1992, 1994)

== Personal life ==
Bagby married Monte Lewis in 1946, and they had four children. She died in 2008, at the age of 83, in Watsonville.
