= List of canal tunnels in the United Kingdom =

This is a list of canal tunnels in the United Kingdom.

== Listed by name ==
Tunnel	Canal	Length	Designer	Coordinates	Notes	Image
Ashford Tunnel	Monmouthshire and Brecon Canal	375 yards (343 m)	Thomas Dadford	51°53.195′N 3°16.525′W	Brecknockshire/Powys Tunnel narrows considerably between northern and southern portals due to repairs to its fabric but is nevertheless navigable by a narrowboat with relative ease.	Ashford Tunnel, northern portal
Ashperton Tunnel	Herefordshire and Gloucestershire Canal	400 yards (370 m)				
Aylestone Tunnel	Herefordshire and Gloucestershire Canal	440 yards (400 m)				
Berwick Tunnel	Shrewsbury Canal	970 yards (890 m)	Josiah Clowes	52°42′4.97″N 2°41′22.22″W	Claimed to be the first canal tunnel with a towpath throughout.	Berwick Tunnel, northern portal
Blisworth Tunnel	Grand Union Canal	3,056 yards (2,794 m)			Northamptonshire	Blisworth Tunnel, southern portal
Branwood Tunnel	Stratford-upon-Avon Canal	352 yards (322 m)				Brandwood Tunnel, eastern portal
Braunston Tunnel	Grand Union Canal	2,042 yards (1,867 m)	Jessop & Barnes	52°16.976′N 1°10.041′W	Northamptonshire	Narrowboat leaving Braunston Tunnel
Bruce Tunnel	Kennet and Avon Canal	502 yards (459 m)				Bruce Tunnel's Eastern Portal (in 1992)
Butterley Tunnel	Cromford Canal	3,063 yards (2,801 m)		53°3.3841′N 1°22.3994′W	Derbyshire	The Butterley Reservoir Adit where it enters the Butterley Tunnel, in 2006
Chirk Tunnel	Llangollen Canal	459 yards (420 m)		52°55′46.91″N 3°3′46.77″W	Near Chirk	View taken from the Chirk Aqueduct
Cookley Tunnel	Staffordshire & Worcestershire Canal	65 yards (59 m)				Cookley Tunnel, western portal
Drakeholes Tunnel	Chesterfield Canal	154 yards (141 m)				
Dudley Tunnel	Birmingham Canal Navigations	3,172 yards (2,900 m)		52.52173°N 2.07840°W	Part of Dudley Canal Line No 1	The southern portal of the Dudley Tunnel
Dunsley Tunnel	Staffordshire & Worcestershire Canal	25 yards (23 m)		52.4568191°N 2.2093904°W		Dunsley Tunnel, west portal, near Kinver
Edgbaston Tunnel	Worcester and Birmingham Canal	105 yards (96 m)				
Foulridge Tunnel	Leeds and Liverpool Canal	1,630 yards (1,490 m)	Robert Whitworth/Samuel Fletcher	53.8745°N 2.1821°W	Also known as the Mile Tunnel	Southern portal, Foulridge Tunnel
Gannow Tunnel	Leeds and Liverpool Canal		Samuel Fletcher			
Gosty Hill Tunnel	Birmingham Canal Navigations	557 yards (509 m)			Part of Dudley Canal Line No 2	Gosty Hill Tunnel, northern portal
Greywell Tunnel	Basingstoke Canal	1,200 yards (1,100 m)			Closed to traffic following cave-in. Now home to Europe's largest bat colony.	The eastern portal of Greywell Tunnel on the Basingstoke Canal
Hardham Tunnel	Arun Navigation	375 yards (343 m)		50°56′56″N 0°31′23″W	Closed since 1888; blocked in 1895 by LBSCR under Mid Sussex Line and Midhurst-Pulborough Line.	Southern Portal, Hardham Tunnel.
Harecastle Tunnel	Trent & Mersey Canal	2,926 yards (2,676 m)	James Brindley/Thomas Telford	53°4′27″N 2°14′11″W	Staffordshire. Comprises parallel "Brindley" and "Telford" tunnels. (The length stated is for the Telford tunnel.)	Northern end of Harecastle Tunnel. Telford's tunnel on the left, Brindley's the right.
Hincaster Tunnel	Lancaster Canal	378 yards (346 m)	Thomas Fletcher	54°15′33″N 2°45′18″W	Opened in 1819. Commercial traffic on the Lancaster Canal ceased north of Lancaster in 1944 and this part of the canal was officially closed following the Transport Act, 1955.	
Lapal Tunnel	Birmingham Canal Navigations	3,795 yards (3,470 m)		52.4450°N 2.0017°W	Part of Dudley Canal Line No 2 (disused—closed 1907)	1955 Ordnance Survey map of the east portal of Lapal Tunnel
Lord Ward's Tunnel	Birmingham Canal Navigations	196 yards (179 m)			In the Dudley Tunnel complex	
Netherton Tunnel	Birmingham Canal Navigations	3,027 yards (2,768 m)		52.50697°N 2.05708°W		The dual towpaths inside the northern portal of Netherton Tunnel
Newbold Tunnel	Oxford Canal	250 yards (230 m)				Illuminated Newbold Tunnel
Newnham Tunnel	Leominster Canal	100 yards (91 m)		52.32685°N 2.52223°W	Worcestershire	
Norwood Tunnel	Chesterfield Canal	2,884 yards (2,637 m)	James Brindley	53.33501°N 1.26971°W	Derbyshire to South Yorkshire. Closed with plans for partial restoration of eastern end.	Norwood Tunnel western portal
Oxenhall Tunnel	Herefordshire and Gloucestershire Canal	2,192 yards (2,004 m)				
Pensax Tunnel	Leominster Canal	3,850 yards (3,520 m)		52.32265°N 2.39083°W	Worcestershire Abandoned during construction.	
Putnall Tunnel	Leominster Canal	330 yards (300 m)		52.29398°N 2.73266°W	Herefordshire	
Sapperton Canal Tunnel	Thames and Severn Canal	3,817 yards (3,490 m)	Josiah Clowes	51.7126°N 2.0618°W	Gloucestershire	The Coates Portal at the south-eastern end of the Sapperton Canal Tunnel.
Scout Tunnel	Huddersfield Narrow Canal	220 yards (200 m)			Unlined, rock tunnel	Scout Tunnel
Shortwood Tunnel	Worcester and Birmingham Canal	613 yards (561 m)				
Southnett Tunnel	Leominster Canal	1,250 yards (1,140 m)		52.32874°N 2.47691°W	Herefordshire	
Standedge Tunnels	Huddersfield Narrow Canal	5,698 yards (5,210 m)		53.591283°N 1.95996°W	West Yorkshire to Greater Manchester	Standedge Tunnel entrance at Marsden
Strood Tunnel	Thames and Medway Canal	3,946 yards (3,608 m)	Ralph Walker	51.4149°N 0.4812°E	Kent	
Tardebigge Tunnel	Worcester and Birmingham Canal	580 yards (530 m)				
Wast Hill Tunnel	Worcester and Birmingham Canal	2,726 yards (2,493 m)		52.3902°N 1.9400°W	West Midlands (county) to Worcestershire	Wast Hill Tunnel, southern portal

== Navigable adits and mine levels ==
An adit is a horizontal entrance to a mine:

Tunnel	Canal	Length	Designer	Coordinates	Notes	Image
Hollingwood Common Tunnel	Chesterfield Canal					
Worsley Navigable Levels	Bridgewater Canal			53°30′2.2″N 2°22′52.2″W	Greater Manchester	Starvationer at Ellesmere Port Canal Museum with a demonstration of the process of legging to push the boat through the tunnels

== Listed by canal ==
=== Grand Union Canal ===
- Blisworth Tunnel, Northamptonshire
- Braunston Tunnel, Northamptonshire
- Crick Tunnel, Northamptonshire
- Husbands Bosworth Tunnel, Leicestershire
- Saddington Tunnel, Leicestershire
- Shrewley Tunnel, Warwickshire

=== Peak Forest Canal ===
- Hyde Bank Tunnel
- Woodley Tunnel

=== Regent's Canal ===
- Islington Tunnel
- Lisson Grove Tunnel
- Maida Hill Tunnel

=== Union Canal (Scotland) ===
- Falkirk Tunnel, Falkirk
- Roughcastle Tunnel, Falkirk. Part of the Falkirk Wheel complex; leads to Locks 1 & 2 and South Basin

== See also ==
- Canals of Ireland
- Canals of the United Kingdom
- History of the British canal system
- Legging (canals)
- List of canals
- List of canal aqueducts in the United Kingdom
- List of canal basins in Great Britain
- List of canal junctions in the United Kingdom
- List of canal locks in the United Kingdom
- List of tunnels
- List of tunnels in the United Kingdom
