= Berwick Tunnel =

Canal tunnel in Shropshire, United Kingdom

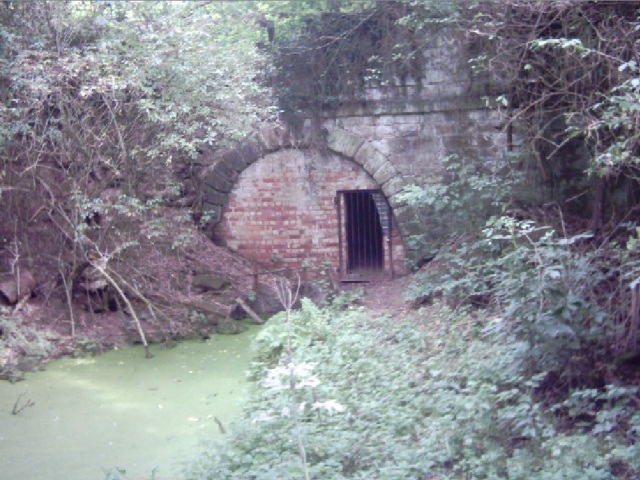
- The north portal of the tunnel

Overview
- Location: Shrewsbury
- Coordinates: 52°42′4.97″N 2°41′22.22″W
- Status: Closed
- Waterway: Shrewsbury Canal

Operation
- Opened: 1797
- Owner: Canal and River Trust

Technical
- Design engineer: Josiah Clowes
- Length: 970 yards (887.0 m)
- Width: 10 feet (3.0 m)
- Towpath: Yes, Removed 1819

Berwick Tunnel is a canal tunnel located on the Shrewsbury Canal, Shropshire, England, UK.

== History ==
The Shrewsbury Canal connected Shrewsbury to the Wombridge Canal, and provided a way to supply the people of Shrewsbury with coal at reasonable prices. The route between Shrewsbury and Wappenshall was relatively flat, although beyond Wappenshall, nine locks and a large inclined plane were needed to reach the Wombridge Canal. There were two more locks before Wappenshall. The valleys of the River Tern and the River Roden were crossed by aqueducts, Longdon-on-Tern Aqueduct being, in Thomas Telford's opinion, the first aqueduct made of cast iron, although Benjamin Outram's iron aqueduct on the Derby Canal actually opened a month earlier. The other major obstacle to a level canal was a bluff of land near a large bend in the River Severn just to the east of Shrewsbury. A route closer to the river might have been possible and would have avoided a tunnel if a large landscaped park at Attingham Hall had not been created there in 1786, to the design of Humphry Repton.

Josiah Clowes was the engineer for the canal from the start of its construction until his death in 1795, and the tunnel was his design. However, William Reynolds, the iron founder responsible for the manufacture of the iron aqueduct, suggested that a towpath should be provided throughout its length. The tunnel was around 10 feet (3.0 m) wide, and the wooden towpath was fixed to bearers built into the wall. It was 3 feet (0.9 m) wide, but because the entire width of the tunnel was filled with water, including the bit below the towpath, the resistance to boats passing through the tunnel was reduced. The structure was 970 yards (890 m) long, and was the first tunnel to be constructed with a towpath. Tunnels without a towpath were arduous for the crews, as the boats had to be legged through them.

The tunnel runs in a south-easterly direction away from Shrewsbury, and passes under fields and a wood. The ground above it is fairly shallow, and there is a ventilation shaft near the middle. Most of the tunnel is lined with bricks, but both portals are faced with stone, and the south-east portal carries the date 1797 on the keystone. The towpath lasted until 1819, when it was removed. Because the tunnel was not straight, it was not possible to see if someone had entered the tunnel from the other end. To overcome this, a byelaw was introduced which stated that whoever reached the centre first should continue, whilst the other boat would have to turn back.

Today the canal is disused, and the tunnel remains, though the ends have been bricked up.

== See also ==
- List of canal tunnels in Great Britain

== Bibliography ==
- Hadfield, Charles (1985). The Canals of the West Midlands. David and Charles. ISBN 0-7153-8644-1.
- Russell, Ronald (1971). Lost Canals of England and Wales. David and Charles. ISBN 0-7153-5417-5.
