= Braunston Tunnel =

Canal tunnel on the Grand Union Canal

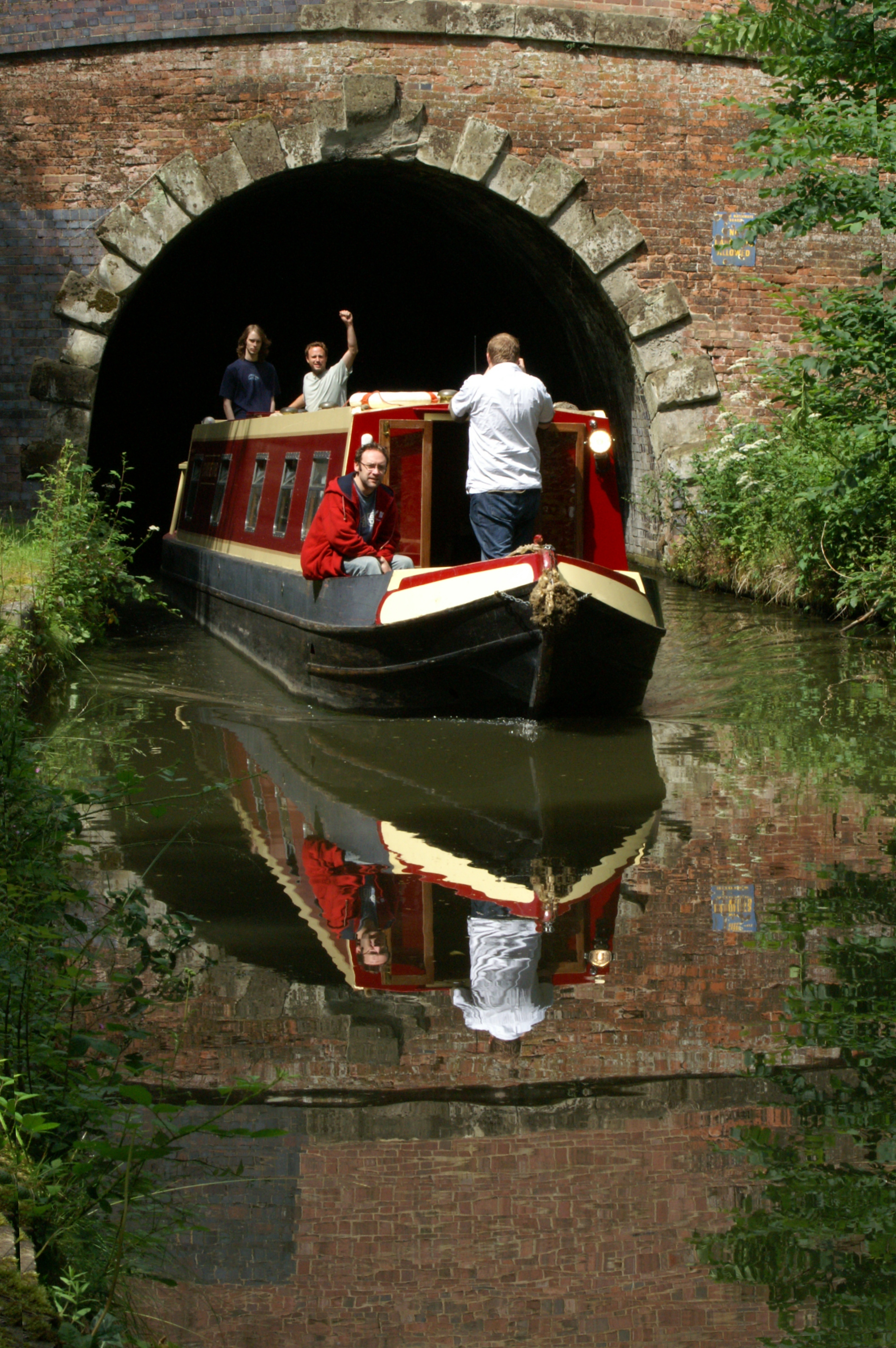
- Eastern portal of the tunnel
- Interactive map of Braunston Tunnel

Overview
- Location: Daventry, Northamptonshire, England
- Coordinates: 52.282915°N 1.172447°W
- Status: Open
- Waterway: Grand Union Canal
- Start: 52.284569°N 1.184721°W
- End: 52.281272°N 1.157869°W

Operation
- Owner: Canal & River Trust

Technical
- Design engineer: William Jessop
- Length: 2,042 yards (1,867.2 m)
- Tunnel clearance: 3.76 metres (12.3 ft)
- Width: 4.8 metres (15.7 ft)
- Towpath: No
- Boat-passable: Yes

Braunston Tunnel is on the Grand Union Canal about 830 yards (760 m) east of Braunston, Northamptonshire, England top lock. It is in the northern outskirts of Daventry, about 2 kilometres (1.2 mi) east of the village of Braunston.

Braunston Tunnel is 2,042 yards (1,867 m) in length. Built by Jessop and Barnes, the tunnel has no towpath and is 4.8 metres (16 ft) wide by 3.76 metres (12.3 ft) high.

It was opened in 1796. Its construction was delayed by soil movement and it was probably the resulting movement that led to the tunnel having a slight 'S' bend. There is room for two 7 feet (2.1 m) beam boats to pass. There are three air shafts along its length.

The tunnel passes underground alongside another Grand Union Canal feature, Drayton Reservoir, from which the feeder enters the canal at the east end of the tunnel.

== Features ==
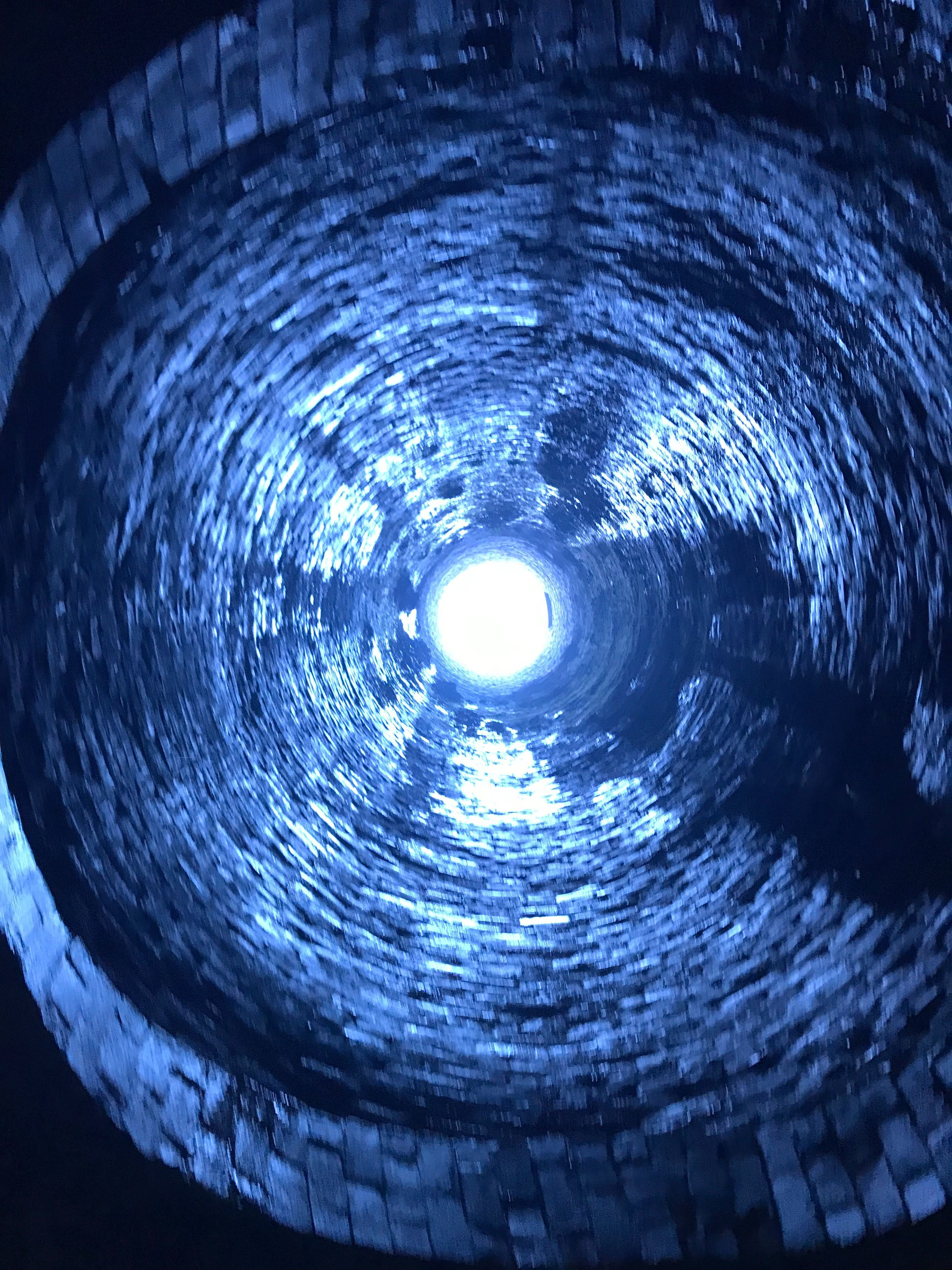
View of the 2nd air shaft from inside Braunston Tunnel

Point	Coordinates (Links to map resources)	OS Grid Ref	Notes
Western portal	52.284569°N 1.184721°W	SP557654	
Mid point	52.282915°N 1.172447°W	SP56556529	
Eastern portal	52.281272°N 1.157869°W	SP576652	

== See also ==
- Legging (canals)
- List of canal tunnels in the United Kingdom
