= River Tern =

River in Shropshire, England

River Tern River Tearne
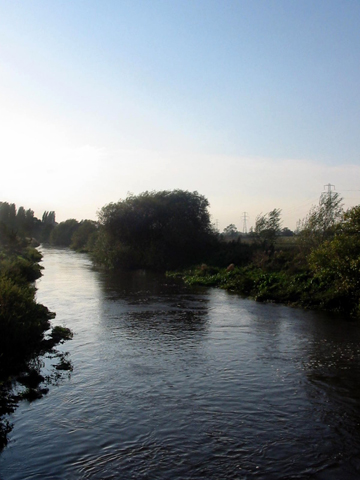
- The Tern near Longdon-on-Tern

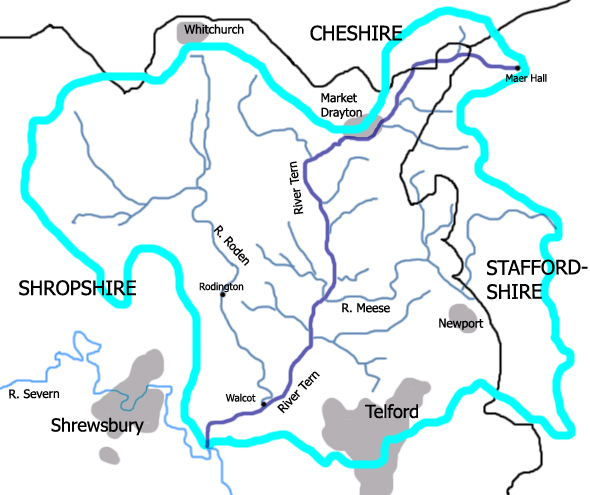
- A map of the Tern and its tributaries. Watershed is shown in cyan.

Location
- Country: United Kingdom
- State: England
- County: Shropshire
- City: Market Drayton, Atcham

Physical characteristics
- Source: Maer Pool
  - location: lake in the grounds of Maer Hall, Staffordshire
  - coordinates: 52°56′36″N 2°19′03″W
  - elevation: 114 m (374 ft)
- Mouth: River Severn
  - location: Attingham Park, Atcham, Shropshire
  - coordinates: 52°40′42″N 2°39′44″W
  - elevation: 44 m (144 ft)
- Length: 30 mi (48 km)

Basin features
- Tributaries
  - left: River Meese, River Strine
  - right: River Roden

The River Tern (also historically known as the Tearne) is a river in Shropshire, England. It rises north-east of Market Drayton in the north of the county. The source of the Tern is considered to be the lake in the grounds of Maer Hall, Staffordshire. From here it flows for about 30 miles (48 km), being fed by the River Meese and the River Roden, until it joins the River Severn near Attingham Park, Atcham.

Extensive peat bog formerly existed, extending from Crudgington on the Tern as far as Newport.

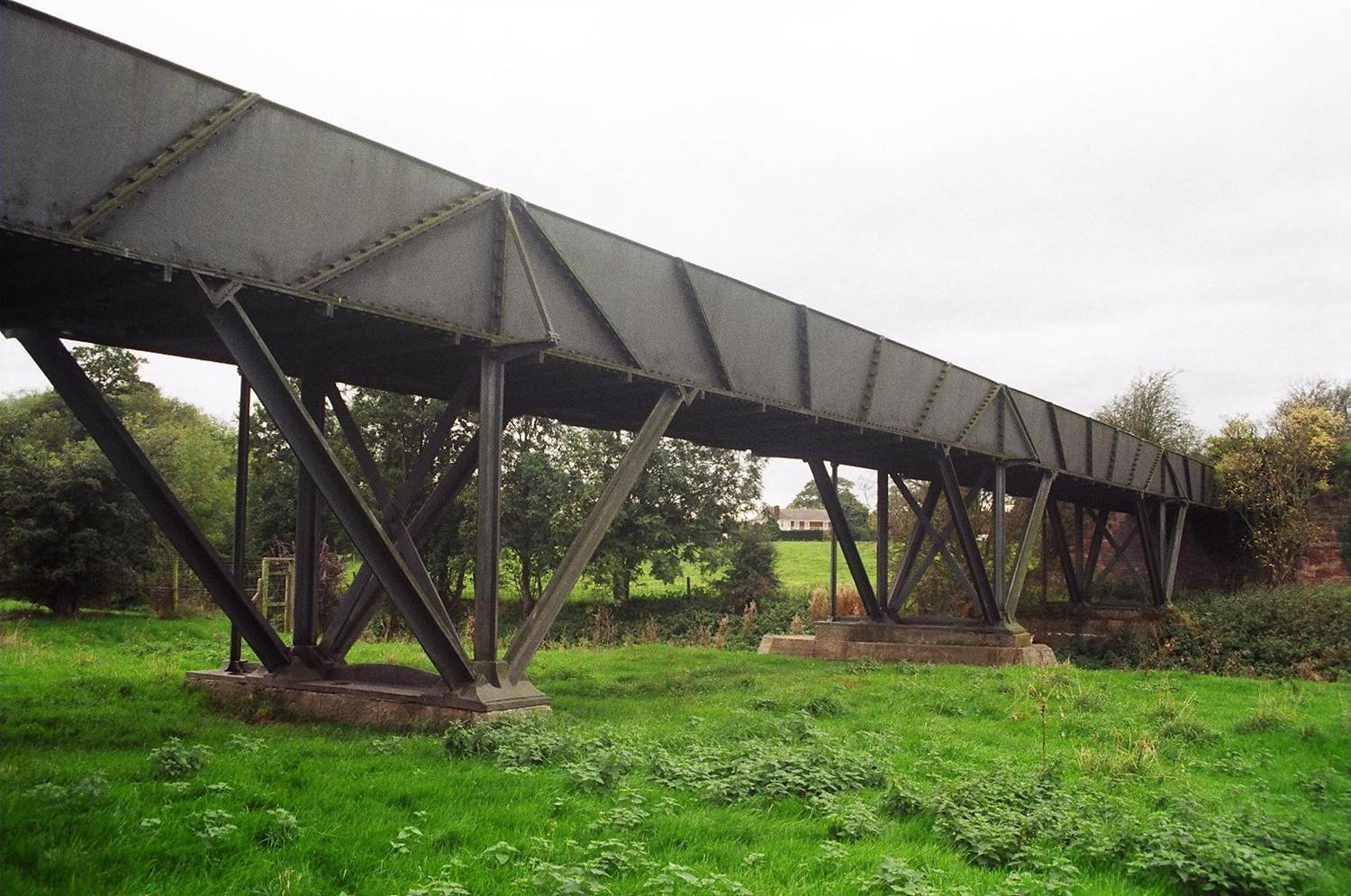
Longdon-on-Tern Aqueduct

At Longdon-on-Tern, the Tern is spanned by the Longdon-on-Tern Aqueduct, the world's first large-scale cast iron navigable aqueduct (Benjamin Outram's 13 m cast iron Holmes Aqueduct pre-dated it by a month), designed by Thomas Telford to carry the Shrewsbury Canal. Although no longer connected to the canal network, The 62-yard (57 m) long structure still stands, but is marooned in the middle of a field.
