= Blisworth Tunnel =

Canal tunnel in Northamptonshire, England

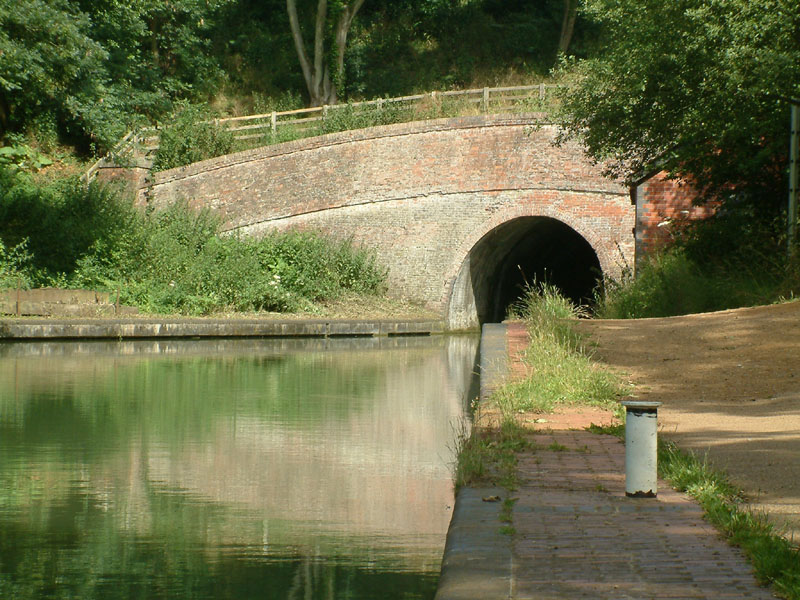
- Southern Portal of Blisworth Tunnel
- Interactive map of Blisworth Tunnel

Overview
- Location: Blisworth, Northants, England
- Coordinates: 52.1560°N 0.9285°W
- OS grid reference: SP734514
- Status: Open, boat trips available.
- Waterway: Grand Union Canal
- Start: 52.1696°N 0.9354°W
- End: 52.1458°N 0.9217°W

Operation
- Constructed: 1793-1805
- Opened: 25 March 1805
- Rebuilt: 1984
- Owner: Canal & River Trust

Technical
- Length: 3,076 yards (2,813 m)
- Tunnel clearance: 4 feet 6 inches (1.4 m)
- Width: 15 feet (4.6 m)
- Water Depth: 5 feet (1.5 m)
- Towpath: No
- Boat-passable: Yes

Blisworth Tunnel is a canal tunnel on the Grand Union Canal in Northamptonshire, England, between the villages of Stoke Bruerne at the southern end and Blisworth at the northern end.

== Measurements ==
The northern end is about 18 miles (29.0 km) from the northern end of the Grand Junction Canal at Braunston, Northamptonshire and the southern end about 20 miles (32.2 km). At 3,076 yards (2,813m) long it is the third-longest navigable canal tunnel on the UK canal network after Standedge Tunnel and Dudley Tunnel (and the ninth-longest canal tunnel in the world). At its deepest point it is ca.143 feet (ca.43m) below ground level.

The tunnel has no tow path inside, but is wide enough for two narrowboats to pass in opposite directions.

== History ==
Work began in 1793, but errors by the contractor left a wiggle in the tunnel, and after three years’ work it collapsed due to quicksand, claiming the lives of 14 men. It was then decided to begin again with a new tunnel.

By the time the rest of the Grand Junction Canal had opened between London and Braunston, Northamptonshire in 1800, apart from the crossing of the River Great Ouse, the section of canal from Blisworth to the lower end of Stoke Bruerne locks was the only section unfinished. This was despite the tunnel having been under construction for seven years: the gap was filled by a temporary horse-drawn tramway over the top of the hill, with goods being transported from boat to wagon and back again. The tramway, built in 1801, was Northamptonshire's first railway. In March 1805, the tunnel was finally opened and the rails were used to connect the main line of the canal to the River Nene until the branch canal to Northampton was constructed.

Until the 1870s travel through the tunnel was only achieved by men lying on their backs pushing the boats with their feet (legging). From 1871 steam tugs were used to pull boats through, and extra ventilation shafts were installed. Boaters wishing to avoid the extra cost involved in using the tugs could still leg their boats through, but by the 1930s motor boats (towing a butty boat) were common so the practice would have been unusual especially by the time the film Painted Boats was filmed there in 1944.

Due to changes in the shape of the tunnel over time, the tunnel became unnavigable. There was major rebuilding of the tunnel in the 1980s, with sections lined with pre-cast concrete rings. It was also used to test out the materials that were later used on the Channel Tunnel. An unused ring is on display near the south portal.

== Features ==
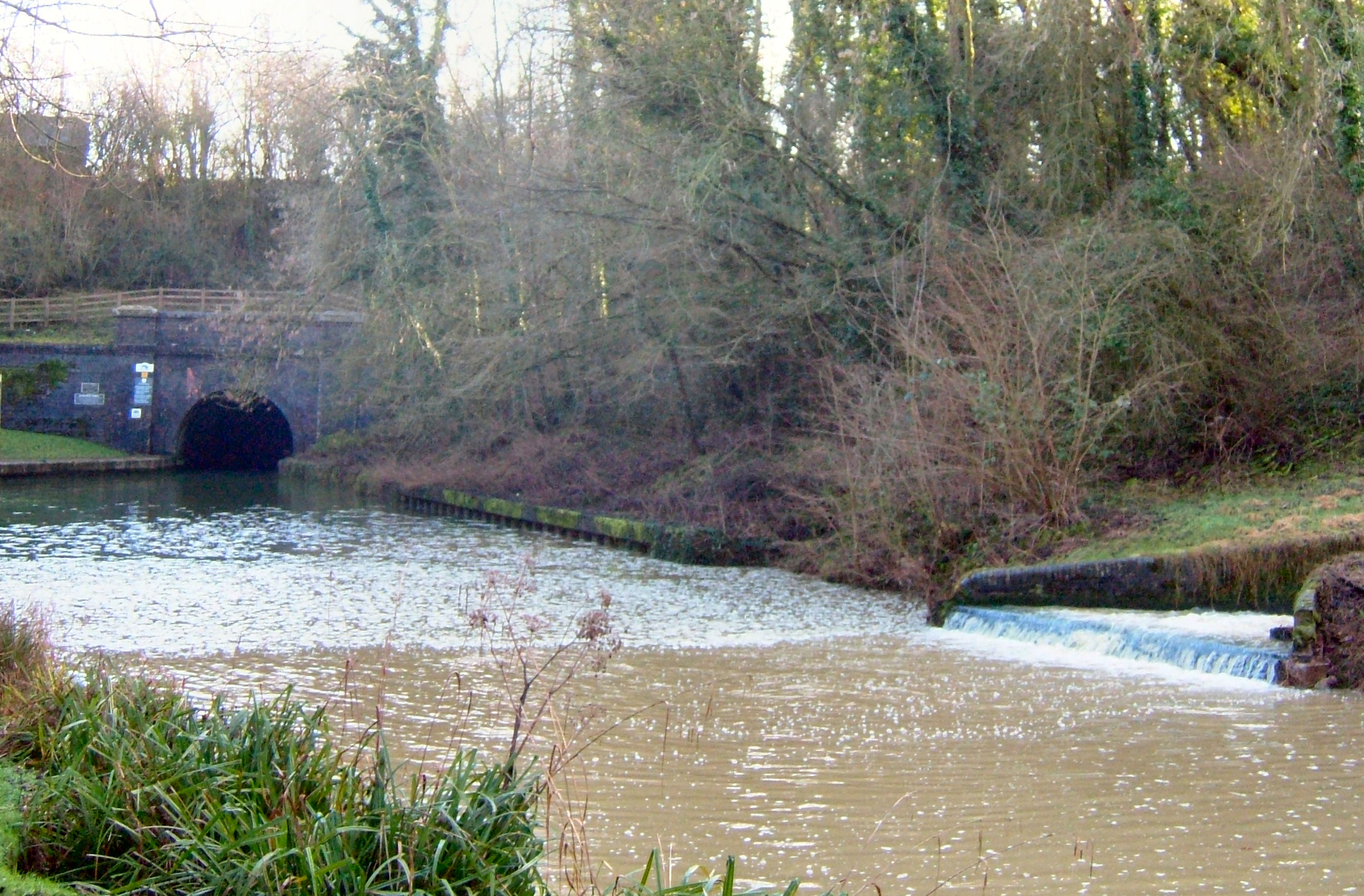
North Portal at Blisworth and water inlet after heavy rain, January 2008

Point	Coordinates (With links to map and aerial photo sources)
Northern portal	52.1696°N 0.9354°W
Midpoint	52.1560°N 0.9285°W
Southern portal	52.1458°N 0.9217°W
