= Donnington Wood Canal =

Canal in Shropshire, England

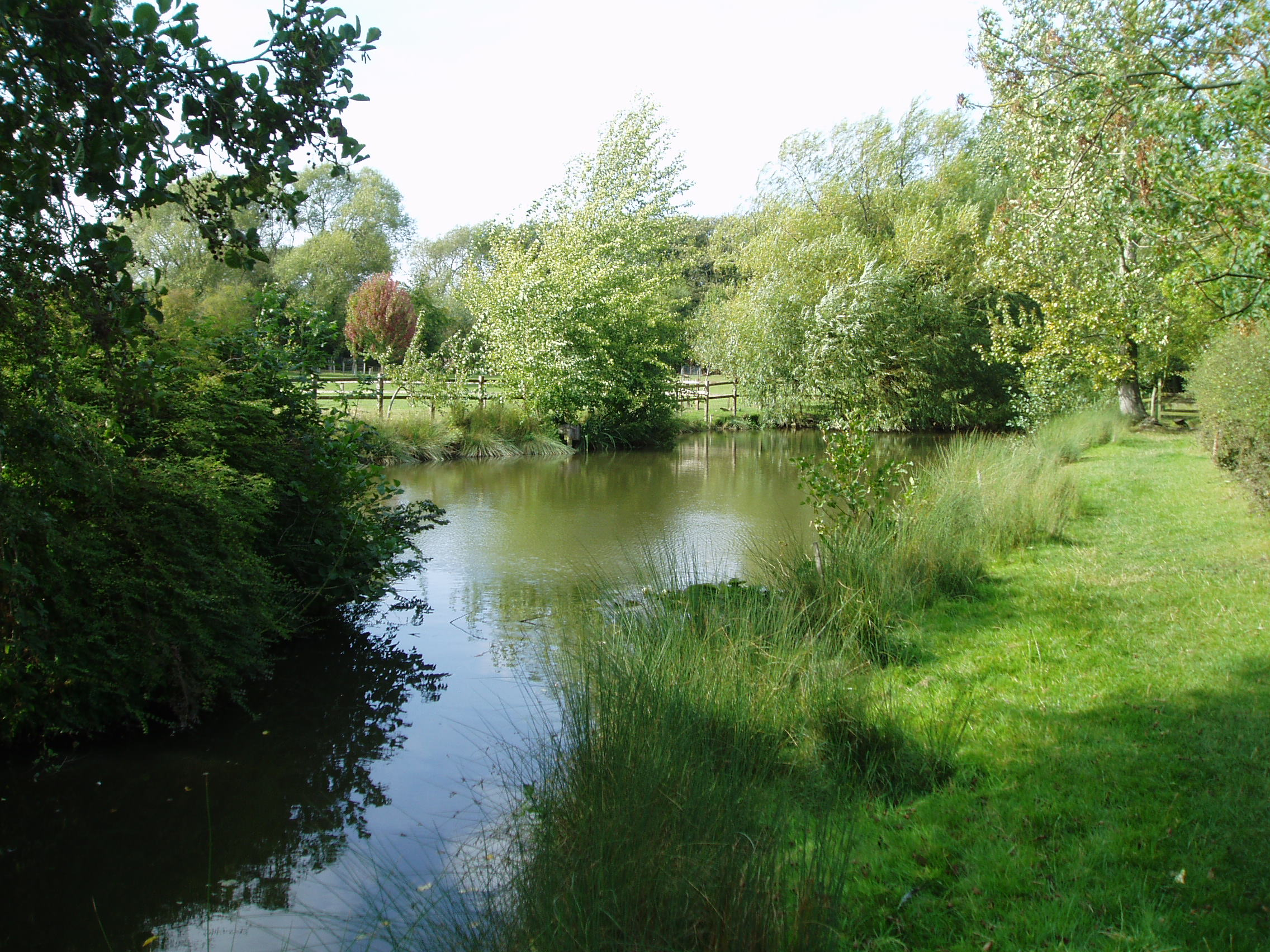
- The basin at the foot of the Lilleshall incline now serves as a pond

Specifications
- Locks: 7 + 1 inclined plane
- Status: parts still traceable

History
- Date of act: Privately built
- Date of first use: 1767
- Date closed: 1904

Geography
- Start point: Pave Lane
- End point: Donnington Wood
- Connects to: Wombridge Canal, Shropshire Canal

The Donnington Wood Canal was a 5.5-mile (8.9 km) private canal in East Shropshire, England, which ran from coal pits owned by Earl Gower at Donnington Wood to Pave Lane on the Wolverhampton to Newport Turnpike Road. It was completed in about 1767 and abandoned in 1904. The canal was part of a larger network of tub-boat canals, which were used for the transport of raw materials, particularly coal, limestone and ironstone, from the locations where they were mined to furnaces where the iron ore was processed. The canal was connected to the Wombridge Canal and the Shropshire Canal.

== History ==
Lord Gower, the brother-in-law of the Duke of Bridgewater, who had pioneered the canal age with his Bridgewater Canal, was the owner of limestone quarries and coal mines in Shropshire. Recognising the potential of canals for the carriage of heavy goods, he formed the Earl Gower & Company in 1764, joining forces with two land agents, John and Thomas Gilbert. Together, they planned a private canal from Lord Gower's coal pits in Donnington Wood to the Wolverhampton to Newport Turnpike Road, (later the A41 road, but now bypassed), terminating at a wharf at Pave Lane, where the coal would be sold. Construction started in February 1765, and 30 men were employed to carry out the work. Wages varied between 3.5 old pence (1.67p) and 1 shilling (5p) per day, and the 5.5 miles (8.9 km) of the main line of the canal were completed by late 1767, with all construction finished by July 1768. There is some evidence that the mine was reached by navigable levels, which allowed the boats to reach the coal face.

Lord Gower became the first Marquis of Stafford in 1786. The office passed to his son, George Leveson-Gower in 1803, and he became the Duke of Sutherland in 1833. Because both men had controlling interests in the canal, it was sometimes known as the Marquis of Stafford's Canal or the Duke of Sutherland's Canal, rather than the Donnington Wood Canal.

The limestone quarries at Lilleshall were served by the Lilleshall Branch, which met the main canal at Hugh's Bridge. At this point it was about 42.7 feet (13.0 m) lower, and so a tunnel was built into the hill, with vertical shafts up to the main line. A pulley system enabled coal to be sent down to the lower level, for use in the production of agricultural lime, and limestone to be raised up to the top level, for use in the production of iron. This system had been replaced by an inclined plane by 1797, which was 123 yards (112 m) long and powered by a steam engine. The inclined plane was used to transfer tramway waggons loaded with cargo between the two levels, and was never used to carry boats.

The Lilleshall Branch also ran to Pitchcroft limeworks, via a junction at Willmore Bridge. This section included two short arms, to other parts of the Lilleshall limeworks. The Pitchcroft limeworks were 35 feet (11 m) lower than the junction, and so seven locks were constructed to reach them. New furnaces were built at Donnington Wood in 1785, after which much of the limestone was transported to them, rather than transporting coal to Lilleshall. Connections to the Wombridge Canal were made in 1788, to the Shropshire Canal in 1790, both at Old Yard Junction, and in 1794, the Wombridge Canal became part of the Shrewsbury Canal. A new set of furnaces was built at Old Lodge, Donnington Wood in 1825, and a new arm was built to connect them to the main line of the canal.

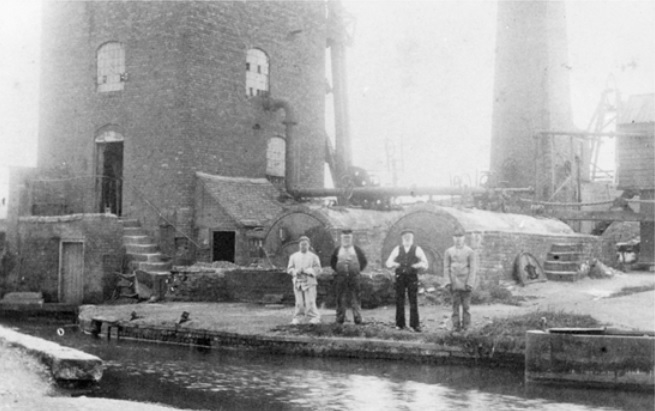
Steven's Water Engine Pit, c.1900 or c.1920, which supplied water to the canal until 1928, long after the mine had closed. One of the tub boats used on the canal can be seen in the foreground.

The water supply for the canal came mostly from the Donnington Wood coal mines. There were a number of beam engines at the mines and at Muxton Bridge, which remained in operation until the late 1920s. Limekiln Pool and Willmer Pool supplied the water for the Lilleshall Branch. The area around Donnington Wood and Wrockwardine Wood saw extensive mining operations, with some 74 shafts sunk between 1818 and 1835. The Lilleshall Company recorded 15 operational pumping engines in 1870, raising water from depths of 150 feet (46 m) to 600 feet (180 m), and producing 20,000 tons of water per month. Sites included Grange, Granville, Muxton Bridge and Waxhill. Steven's Pit, also known as Stephen's, was opened some time before 1830, and pumped water from 570 feet (170 m). In 1870, its beam engine was powered by a 52-inch (130 cm) cylinder. The engine operated until 6 February 1928, supplying water to the canal, and was scrapped soon afterwards. Once pumping ceased, the western end of the canal dried out.

Traffic on the Lilleshall branch declined after 1844, when the Humber branch of the Shrewsbury Canal, with its network of tramways, provided the Lilleshall Company with a more direct connection to the canal network. With the closing of the Lilleshall limeworks in the 1870s, the Lilleshall branch ceased to be used, which resulted in the section to Pave Lane being used very little, and finally closing in 1882. The Old Lodge furnace arm ceased to be used in 1888 when the furnaces closed, and soon afterwards, part of the bed on the Pave Lane section was used for a carriage drive to Lilleshall Hall, then owned by the Duke of Sutherland, Gower's descendant. The final section of about 1.2 miles (1.9 km) was leased to the Lilleshall Company in the 1880s and continued to be used until it was abandoned in 1904.

== Context ==
Tub-boats were approximately 20 ft by 6 ft 4 in (6.1 m x 1.9 m), and could carry up to 8 tonnes of cargo. They were usually marshalled into trains, pulled by a single horse. Trains could consist of up to twelve tub-boats, when laden with coal, which was one of the heavier cargos, and a train of twelve boats would hold around 60 tons of coal. When laden with less dense cargoes, such as limestone, a single horse could pull up to 20 tub-boats. When travelling along the canal, the boats were kept under control by a man on the towpath using a long pole.

== Route ==
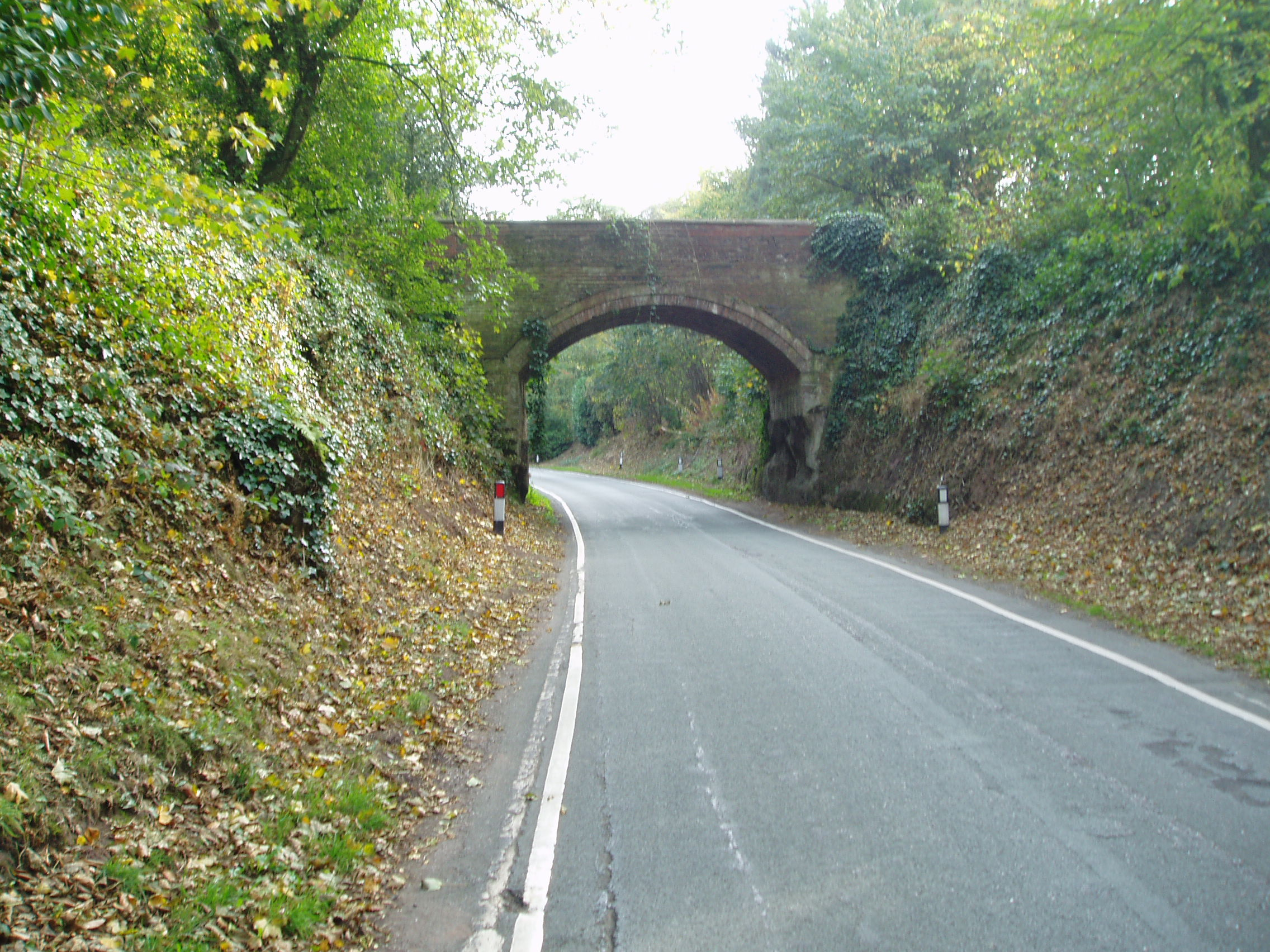
Little Hales Bridge crossed the bed of the canal, which is now part of the road to Lilleshall Hall

The canal ran in an approximate south-west to north-east direction from Donnington Wood to Pave Lane. For most of its length, its course was close to the modern 330-foot (100 m) contour. The Lilleshall and Pitchcroft branches were to the north of the main line. The location of the terminal basin at Pave Lane now lies beneath agricultural buildings which are part of Pave Lane Farm. After crossing fields, the bridge which carried Pitchcroft Lane over it still exists, with the canal bed and towpath clearly visible beneath. Part of the bed was used for a carriage drive to Lilleshall Hall, which is now one of five National Sports Centres, and the access road follows the same route. It passes through a cutting under Little Hales Bridge, which once carried a track from Little Hales Manor Farm over the canal. A little further on, the canal turned to the west while the drive continues southwards, and there is a section of canal bed in the woods which often contains water.

After crossing more fields, the course can again be seen at Incline Plantation. A large basin is visible at the head of the incline, and a road, appropriately called The Incline, runs along the towpath to Hugh's Bridge, which carries a minor road over the canal. The canal then ran due south to the remains of Lilleshall Abbey, which it skirts to the east, turning to the south-east to cross under Lilyhurst Road at Abbey Bridge. Passing Abbey Farm, it then crossed more fields to arrive at the outskirts of Muxton. Parts of it are now within the boundaries of the golf course, and some parts here still hold water. It then runs along the edge of Granville Nature Reserve, and into Granville Country Park. The route is difficult to follow, as the area was also crossed by a number of railway lines, and has been landscaped to form the park. The Old Lodge basin with parts of the associated furnaces are located by the main road into the park, and some restoration work was carried out in 1988, which included rebuilding the wharf, removing trees, and dredging the basin. However, it is difficult to visualise the arm to the canal, because spoil from the mining has raised the ground level so much. Beyond the A4640 road, all traces of the canal have been obliterated by subsequent development. The terminal basin and the junction with the Wombridge Canal and the Shropshire Canal were close to the location of the modern Council Offices.

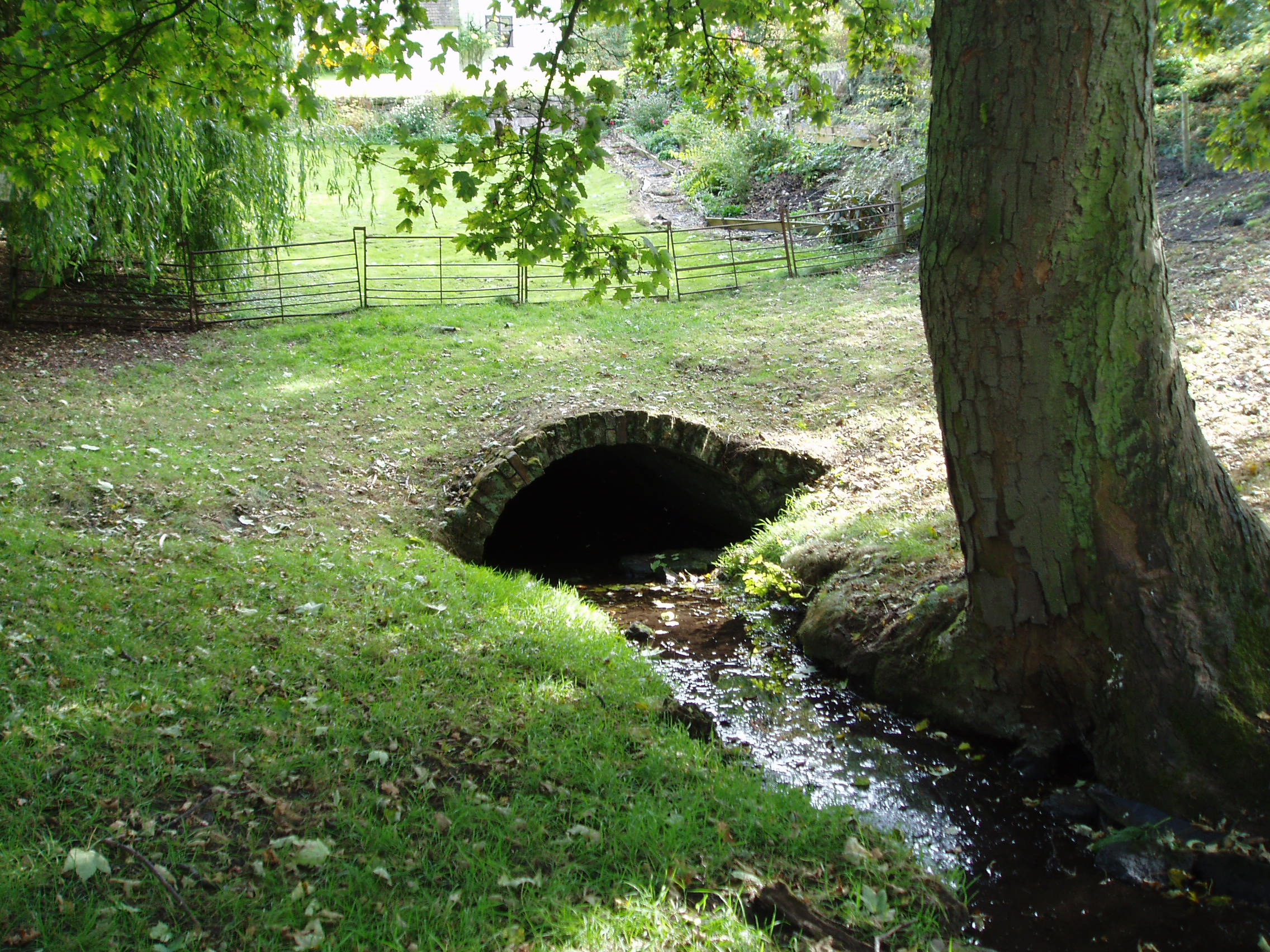
The remains of the tunnel which served the vertical shafts from the main line of the canal prior to the building of the inclined plane in 1797

The Lilleshall Branch ran down an incline from near Hugh's Bridge, and its grassy slope is clearly visible. The basin at the bottom of the incline is now a pond, and the top of the tunnel which met the vertical shafts can still be seen. From the incline, the bed of the canal towards the Lilleshall Limeworks is clearly visible for most of its length. The southern portal of the bridge which carried Willmoor Lane over the canal is still visible below vegetation, although the northern parapet has been demolished, and the track widened by tipping rubble against the north portal. The branch to Pitchcroft Limeworks is not easily traceable, although the field boundaries mark its route for most of the way, and a section of the bed is visible by the cottages at Pitchcroft. There are some remains of the bridge, but the basin beyond the road has disappeared.

Although the documentary sources all mention two branches from the Pitchcroft Branch to the Lilleshall Limeworks, only one is shown on the 1888 Ordnance Survey map. The main Lilleshall Branch is still shown as a canal, but the Pitchcroft Branch and its arm to the Lilleshall Limeworks are shown as disused. The location of three locks near to the junction can be seen, but the locations of the other four locks are not obvious by this date.

== Points of interest ==
Point	Coordinates (Links to map resources)	OS Grid Ref	Notes
Pave Lane wharf	52.7463°N 2.3574°W	SJ759165	
Pitchcroft Lane bridge	52.7441°N 2.3634°W	SJ755163	
Little Hales bridge	52.7415°N 2.3688°W	SJ751160	
Lilleshall Branch junction	52.7330°N 2.3863°W	SJ740151	Top of incline
Abbey Bridge	52.7233°N 2.3921°W	SJ736140	By Lilleshall Abbey
Section in Muxton Golf Course	52.7152°N 2.4086°W	SJ724131	
Steven's Engine	52.7107°N 2.4299°W	SJ710126	
Old Forge basin	52.7080°N 2.4194°W	SJ717123	
Terminal wharf	52.7101°N 2.4349°W	SJ707125	Jn with Wombridge Canal
Willmore Bridge	52.7393°N 2.3924°W	SJ736158	Jn with Pitchcroft Arm
Lilleshall Basin	52.7436°N 2.3949°W	SJ734162	End of Lilleshall Branch
Arm to Lilleshall Limeworks	52.7422°N 2.3896°W	SJ737161	from Pitchcroft Arm
Pitchcroft Basin	52.7508°N 2.3876°W	SJ739170	End of Pitchcroft Arm

== Bibliography ==
- Baugh, G.C.; Elrington, C.R., eds. (1985). A History of the County of Shropshire, Volume 11, Telford. British History Online.
- Brown, Ivor (2010). "Some Notes on the Mines of the Lilleshall Company, No.5" (PDF). Journal of the Shropshire Caving & Mining Club (Autumn Issue No. 2010.3). Archived from the original (PDF) on 27 September 2017.
- Hadfield, Charles (1985). The Canals of the West Midlands. David and Charles. ISBN 978-0-7153-8644-6.
- Morriss, Richard K (1991). Canals of Shropshire. Shropshire Books. ISBN 978-0-903802-47-5.
- Russell, Ronald (1971). Lost Canals of England and Wales. David and Charles. ISBN 978-0-7153-5417-9.
- Williams, W Howard (1980). The Canal System of East Shropshire. Shropshire Libraries. ISBN 978-0-903802-11-6.

== See also ==
Media related to Donnington Wood Canal at Wikimedia Commons

- Canals of Great Britain
- History of the British canal system
