= Legging (canals) =

Obsolete occupation

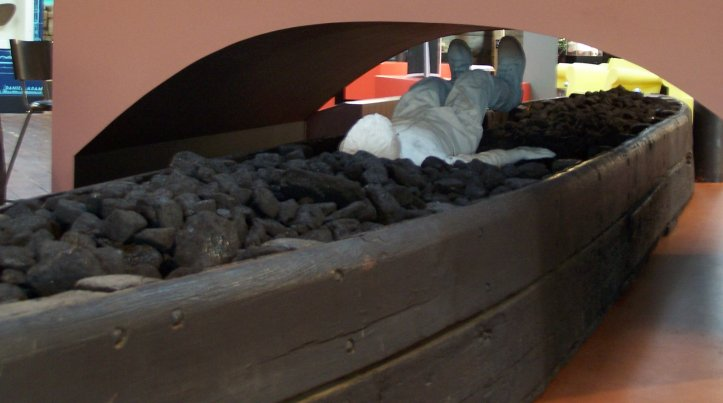
Starvationer at Ellesmere Port Canal Museum with a demonstration of the process of legging to push the boat through the tunnels of the Worsley Navigable Levels

Legging is a method of moving a boat through a canal tunnel or adit containing water. This method of navigating through canal tunnels and adits was commonly used in canal tunnels during the 18th and early 19th centuries.

== Legging in canal tunnels ==
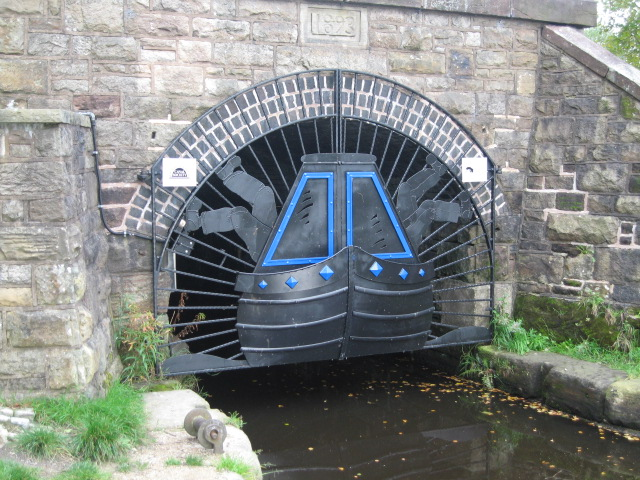
The entrance gate of the Standedge Tunnel with an artistic steelwork showing two leggers

Early canal tunnels were built without a towpath as this would require a much larger bore, and hence cost more to build. Prior to the introduction of motorised boats, legging was one of the few options for getting a boat through such a tunnel.

Two people were required. They would lie on a plank across the bows of the boat, and holding the plank with their hands, would propel the boat with their feet against the tunnel wall. This was quite a dangerous activity and resulted in many deaths. In later years 'wing' boards were hooked on to the boat to make the operation safer. At Crimson Hill tunnel, alternate stones in the walls were recessed to provide better tread for the leggers. While the boat was being legged through the tunnel, the horse would be led over the hill.

On short tunnels the legging was done by the boat owner and crew. At long tunnels, professional leggers were available, such as at Blisworth Tunnel and Dudley Tunnel. At the 3 mile long Standedge Tunnel expert leggers could get an empty boat through in 1 hour 20 minutes, taking 3 hours with a full load, for which they were paid 1s 6d.

At Blisworth the boatmen were often terrorised into employing leggers, so in 1827 the leggers were registered and issued with brass armlets for identification.

At Standedge Tunnel, the use of official leggers eventually became a requirement for passage.

At Morwellham, boatmen were said to have pushed against the tunnel roof. This tunnel has a considerable flow of water through it, and progress was very slow in one direction.

Berwick Tunnel on the Shrewsbury Canal, opened in 1797 was the first tunnel to be built with a towpath, negating the need for legging.

Legging was also the main form of propulsion used in the man-made adits in Speedwell Cavern until the boats were given electric motors. Sometimes the guide will switch off the boat's engine and leg along the roof of the cave to demonstrate how the boats used to be worked by miners. They got paid £11.05 in today's money.
