= Longdon-on-Tern Aqueduct =

Grade I listed navigable aqueduct near Longdon-on-Tern, Shropshire, England

Longdon-upon-Tern Aqueduct
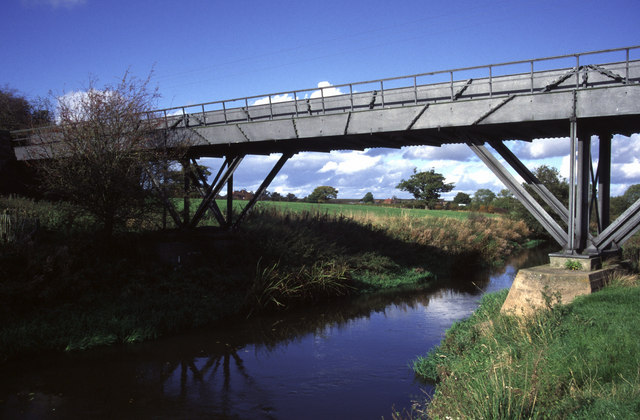
- The aqueduct pictured in 1994
- Coordinates: 52.737°N 2.567888°W
- Carries: Shrewsbury Canal (now disused)
- Crosses: River Tern
- Heritage status: Grade I Listed building
- Historic England Listing Entry Number: 1037006

Characteristics
- Material: Cast iron
- Total length: 186 feet (57 m)
- Width: 9 feet (2.7 m)
- Water depth: 3 feet (0.91 m)
- Traversable?: No (now drained)
- Towpaths: South side
- No. of spans: 4

History
- Designer: Thomas Telford
- Construction end: 1796

The Longdon-upon-Tern Aqueduct, near Longdon-upon-Tern in Shropshire, was one of the first two canal aqueducts to be built from cast iron.

== History ==
The cast iron canal aqueduct was re-engineered by Thomas Telford after the first construction designed by William Clowes was swept away by floods. It was built in 1796 to carry the Shrewsbury Canal across the River Tern near Longdon-upon-Tern in Shropshire. The 186 feet (57 m) aqueduct was opened one month after Benjamin Outram's 44 feet (13 m) cast iron Holmes Aqueduct on the Derby Canal, the world's first cast iron canal aqueduct. Since the closure of the Shrewsbury Canal in 1944, the aqueduct has been disused. The aqueduct is an Historic England Grade I listed building and has been on the register since 30 March 1971.

== Description ==
The canal was carried in a cast-iron trough 9 feet (2.7 m) wide, 3 feet (0.91 m) deep and 186 feet (57 m) long and divided in four spans, each of 47 feet 8 inches (14.53 m).

== See also ==
- Grade I listed buildings in Shropshire
- Listed buildings in Rodington, Shropshire
