= River Meese =

River in Shropshire, England

Meese
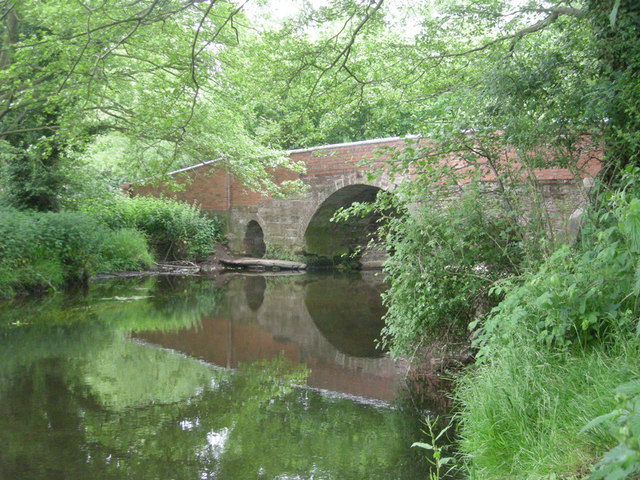
- River Meese near Cherrington

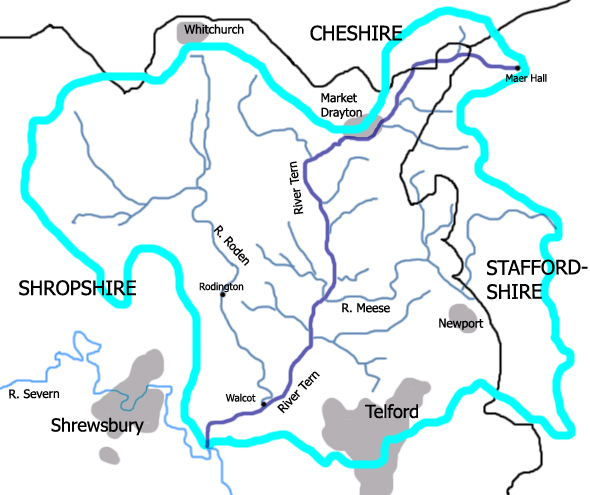
- Map showing the River Meese, the other tributaries of the River Tern, and its drainage basin

Location
- Country: England

Physical characteristics
- Source
  - location: Weston-under-Lizard
  - coordinates: 52.6926°N 2.2610°W
  - elevation: 123 m (404 ft)
- Mouth
  - location: River Tern near Great Bolas
  - coordinates: 52.7836°N 2.5372°W
  - elevation: 54 m (177 ft)

The River Meese is a river located in Shropshire, England. It is a tributary of the River Tern, which in turn is a tributary of the River Severn.

The river is only known as the Meese below Aqualate Mere, but its source lies considerably higher via the stream known successively as Dawford Brook, Lynn Brook, Moreton Brook, Back Brook, and Coley Brook, which flows north from its source near the Roman Watling Street (now the A5) just to the east of Weston-under-Lizard until it reaches Aqualate Mere.

For around 2 kilometres (1.2 mi) near Newport, Shropshire it forms the border between Shropshire and Staffordshire, where it is joined by Lonco Brook from the north.
