= Longdon-on-Tern =

Village in Shropshire, England

Longdon-Upon-Tern
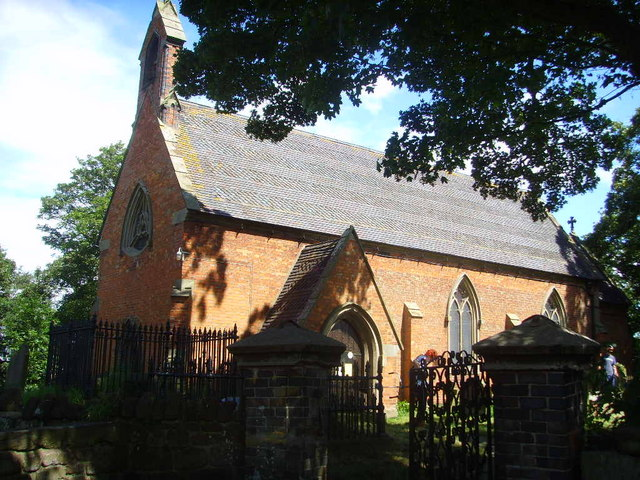
- St Bartholomew's Church, Longdon-Upon-Tern

- Location within Shropshire
- OS grid reference: SJ615154
- Civil parish: Rodington
- Unitary authority: Telford and Wrekin
- Ceremonial county: Shropshire
- Region: West Midlands
- Country: England
- Sovereign state: United Kingdom
- Post town: TELFORD
- Postcode district: TF6
- Dialling code: 01952
- Police: West Mercia
- Fire: Shropshire
- Ambulance: West Midlands
- UK Parliament: The Wrekin

Longdon-upon-Tern (also known as Longdon-on-Tern or colloquially Longdon) is a village in the civil parish of Rodington, in the unitary district of Telford and Wrekin, in Shropshire, England. It is approximately 7 miles (11 km) east of Shrewsbury and 7 miles (11 km) north-west of Telford. Longdon-Upon-Tern is situated on the River Tern, a tributary of the River Severn. In 1971, the parish had a population of 127.

Settled since at least the Normans, the village is notable as the site of the Longdon-on-Tern Aqueduct, the first large-scale cast iron navigable aqueduct, designed and built by Thomas Telford for the canal. The aqueduct is Grade I listed and a preserved as a scheduled monument.

== History ==
The name Longdon is derived from two Old English words, lang and dūn, meaning long hill.

A settlement at Longdon-Upon-Tern dates to at least the Normans, as it is mentioned in the Domesday Book of 1086 as Languedune, held by St. Alkmund's Church, Shrewsbury. It continued with the church until the 12th century when it passed to Lilleshall Abbey until its dissolution in the 16th century. Its Domesday assets were: 2 hides, 5 ploughs, and a mill worth 5s.

=== Parish ===
Longdon-Upon-Tern is an ecclesiastical parish. On 1 April 1988 the parish named "Longdon upon Tern" merged with Rodington ecclesiastical parish, a close by village, to create the civil parish of Rodington with a parish council, to relieve civil responsibilities from the two ecclesiastical parishes. The civil parish boundaries now include the areas of Long Waste, Long Lane, Isombridge, Marsh Green, Sugdon, Rodington, Rodington Heath, and Longdon-Upon-Tern. Although the two separate parishes have now merged into a civil parish with a parish council, the two distinct ecclesiastical parishes maintain both village halls hosting varied community activities.

=== Church ===
Today's church is the Church of St Bartholomew. This is a small 18th-century, Grade II listed, Georgian stone and red brick church. Built in 1742 the church has had major alterations and an extension in the late 19th century. On the same site stands the refurbished Grade II* listed Longdon-Upon-Tern village hall, formerly a schoolhouse provided by the Duke of Sutherland and opened in 1849. Due to a decline in population, the school closed in 1970.

=== Population ===
Longdon-Upon-Tern total population

There have been no population figures for Longdon-Upon-Tern since 1961 as the census data from Longdon-Upon-Tern is now included with the Rodington Civil Parish. In 2001 the population for Rodington Civil Parish was 869. The last population figure for Longdon-Upon-Tern in 1961 was 126. In 1801 at the time of the first UK census, the population of Longdon-Upon-Tern was 102 and peaked in 1881 at 131. The adjacent graph shows the total population in Longdon-Upon-Tern from 1801 to 1961.

== Aqueduct ==
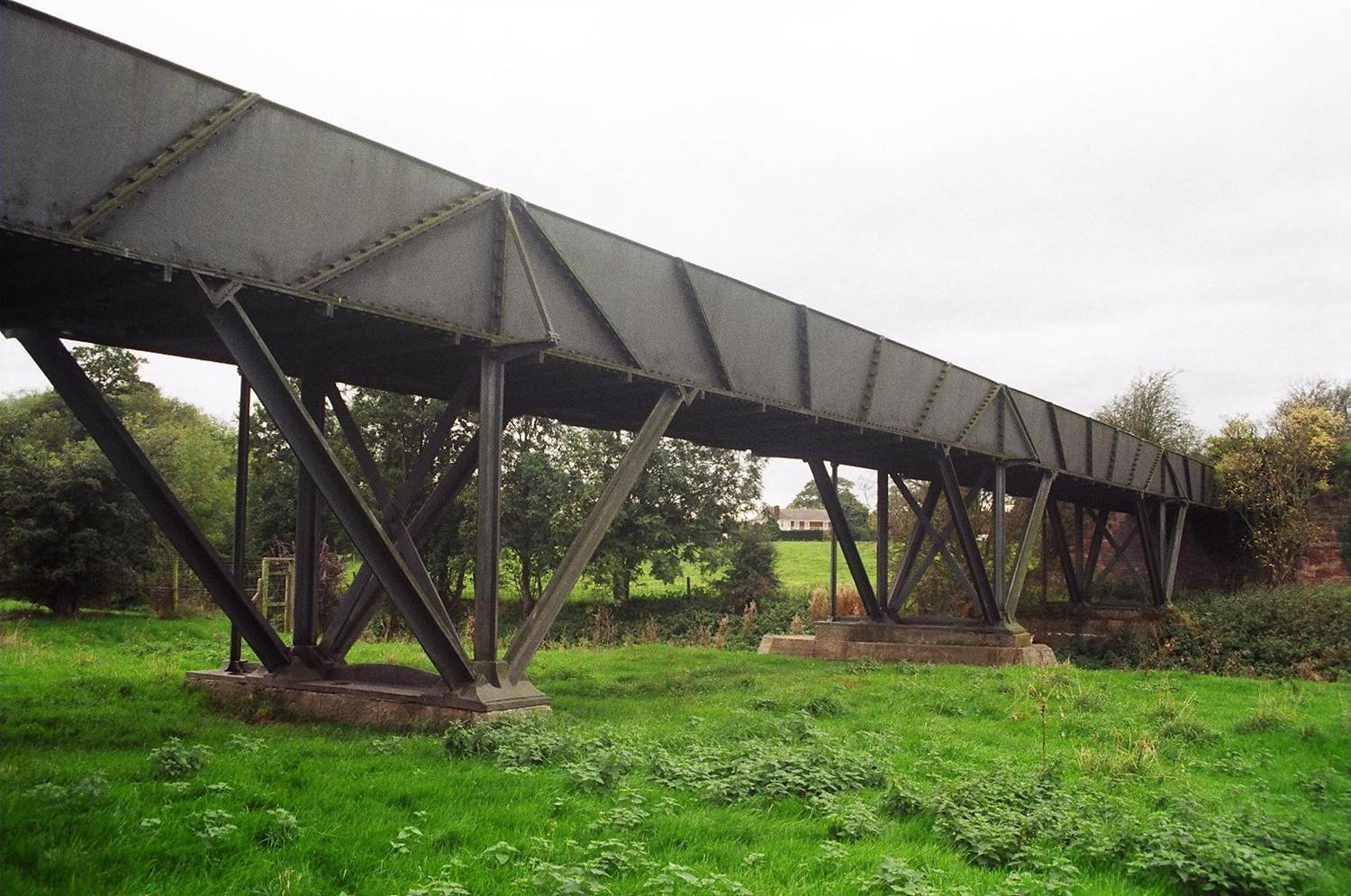
Longdon-Upon-Tern aqueduct

The village is particularly notable as the location of the world's first large-scale cast iron navigable aqueduct (52°44′13″N 2°34′04″W, grid reference SJ617156). Designed by Thomas Telford, the aqueduct opened in 1797 as part of the Shrewsbury Canal. Telford built the 57 m (187 ft) cast iron aqueduct to replace a stone aqueduct, originally built by Josiah Clowes, which was swept away by floods in 1795. Although the canal was abandoned in 1944 due to the shift in traffic to the rail networks, the aqueduct remains. It is Grade I listed and a scheduled monument, situated in fields astride the River Tern. The monument is signposted and visible from the road. Clearly marked footpaths lead directly to the monument from a small roadside car park. Telford later designed and built the very much larger Pontcysyllte Aqueduct in Wales, now designated as a World Heritage Site.

== Transport links ==
=== Bus ===
The 65 from Wellington to High Ercall passes through Longdon-Upon-Tern with busses departing every 60 minutes from Wellington.

=== Train ===
The closest railway station is 6.4 km (4 mi) away in Wellington, from here there are frequent services to Shrewsbury and Birmingham.

== See also ==
- Listed buildings in Rodington, Shropshire
