= Shrewsbury Canal =

English Canal

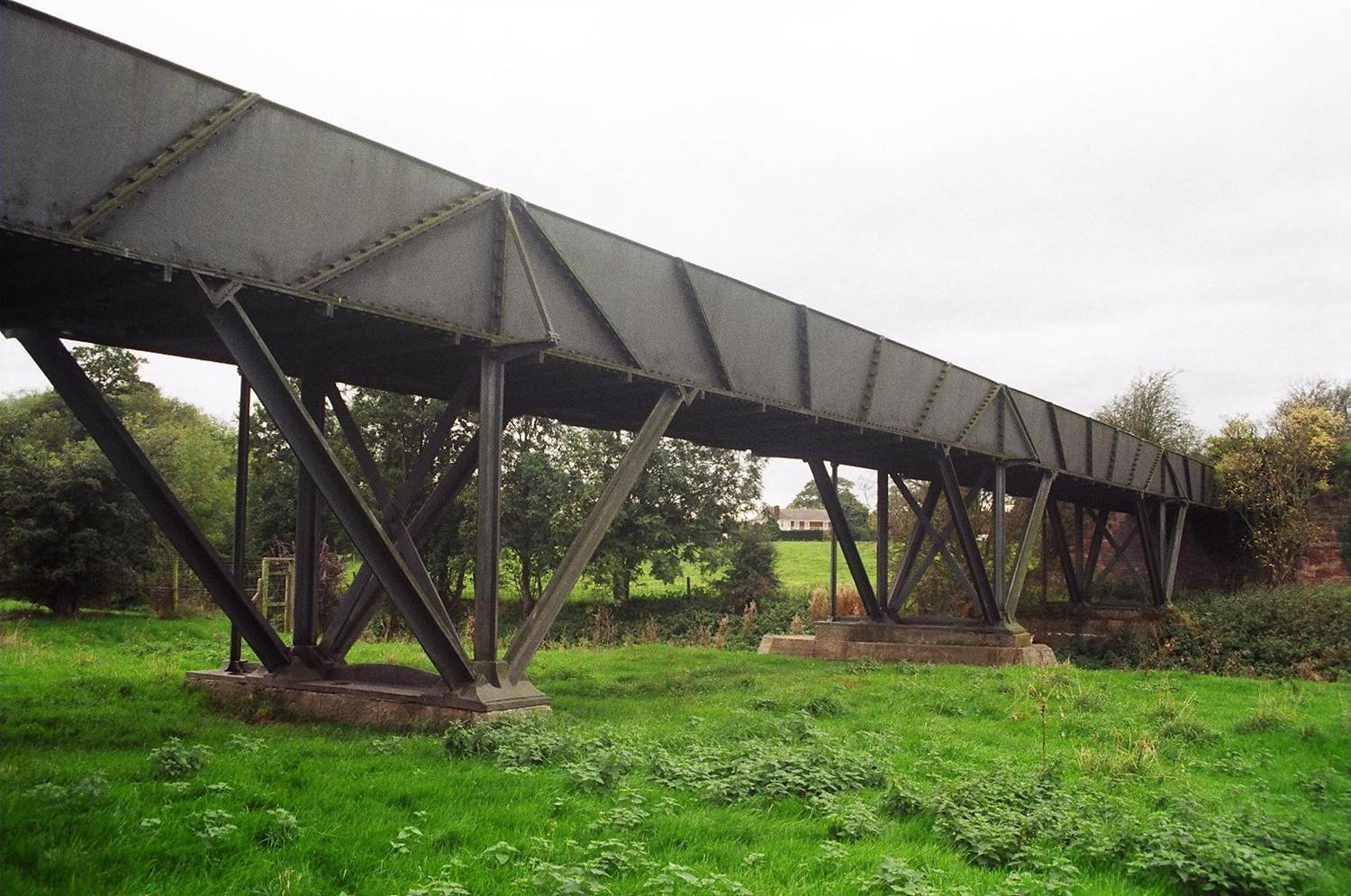
- Telford's 1796 cast-iron aqueduct at Longdon-on-Tern

Specifications
- Maximum boat length: 81 ft 0 in (24.69 m) (Locks could hold four 20-foot tub-boats)
- Maximum boat beam: 7 ft 0 in (2.13 m) (originally 6 ft 7 in or 2.01 m) (Only Eyton locks were widened)
- Locks: 34 (originally 11) (plus Trench inclined plane)
- Status: Early stages of restoration
- Navigation authority: None

History
- Original owner: Shrewsbury Canal Company
- Principal engineer: Josiah Clowes / Thomas Telford
- Date of act: 1793
- Date of first use: 1794
- Date completed: 1797
- Date closed: 1944

Geography
- Start point: Norbury Junction (originally Trench) (Newport Branch opened 1835, connecting canal to national network)
- End point: Shrewsbury
- Branches: Newport Branch, Humber Branch
- Connects to: Shropshire Union Canal, Shropshire Canal, Donnington Wood Canal

The Shrewsbury Canal (or Shrewsbury and Newport Canal) was a canal in Shropshire, England. Authorised in 1793, the main line from Trench to Shrewsbury was fully open by 1797, but it remained isolated from the rest of the canal network until 1835, when the Birmingham and Liverpool Junction Canal built the Newport Branch from Norbury Junction to a new junction with the Shrewsbury Canal at Wappenshall. After ownership passed to a series of railway companies, the canal was officially abandoned in 1944; many sections have disappeared, though some bridges and other structures can still be found. There is an active campaign to preserve the remnants of the canal and to restore the Norbury to Shrewsbury line to navigation.

== History ==
Shrewsbury Canal Act 1793
- Act of Parliament
- Parliament of the United Kingdom
- Long title: An Act for making and maintaining a Navigable Canal from the North End of the Shropshire Canal, in the Township of Rockwardine Wood, in the County of Salop, to the Town of Shrewsbury, in the said County.
- Citation: 33 Geo. 3. c. 113
- Territorial extent: Great Britain

Dates
- Royal assent: 3 June 1793
- Commencement: 3 June 1793 (Note: The Acts of Parliament (Commencement) Act 1793.)
Other legislation
Amended by	Ellesmere and Chester Canals Unification Act 1813

Status: Amended

Text of statute as originally enacted

From 1768 several small canals were built in the area of what is now Telford. These canals carried tub boats. The first of these was the Donnington Wood Canal which opened in 1768, to be followed by the Wombridge Canal and the Ketley Canal, both opened in 1788, and the Shropshire Canal, which opened in 1791. The network linked Lilleshall and Pave Lane in the north to Coalbrookdale and Coalport in the south. Following a survey of the route by George Young from Worcester in 1792, an act of Parliament, the Shrewsbury Canal Act 1793 (33 Geo. 3. c. 113) was obtained in 1793 which authorised the creation of a canal to link the town of Shrewsbury with the east Shropshire canal network serving coal mines and ironworks around Oakengates, Ketley, Donnington Wood and Trench, nowadays part of the new town of Telford. The act authorised the raising of £50,000 in shares, and an additional £20,000 if necessary. This canal became the Shrewsbury Canal, and incorporated 1 mile 88 yards (1.690 km) of the Wombridge Canal, which were purchased for £840 from William Reynolds to provide access to the Donnington Wood Canal and the Shropshire Canal.

Josiah Clowes was appointed chief engineer, but died in 1795 part way through construction. He was succeeded by Thomas Telford, then just establishing himself as Shropshire's county surveyor and already engaged on the Ellesmere Canal slightly further north. The Ellesmere Canal was originally intended to connect Chester with Shrewsbury, but never reached the latter – it became the modern Llangollen Canal and Montgomery Canal.

=== Infrastructure ===
One of Telford's first tasks was to build Longdon-on-Tern Aqueduct as a rebuild of a stone aqueduct over the River Tern at Longdon-on-Tern which had been built by Clowes but swept away by floods in February 1795. Telford's stonemason instincts initially led him to consider replacing the original structure with another stone-built aqueduct, but the heavy involvement of iron-masters in the Shrewsbury Canal Company, notably William Reynolds, led him to reconsider. Instead, it was rebuilt using a 62-yard (57 m) cast iron trough cast in sections at Reynolds' Ketley ironworks and bolted together in 1796. The main trough was 7 ft 6 in (2.29 m) wide and 4 ft 6 in (1.37 m) deep, with a narrower trough to one side which formed the towpath. The aqueduct was the world's first large-scale iron navigable aqueduct, though it was narrowly predated by a much smaller 44-foot-long (13 m) structure on the Derby Canal built by Benjamin Outram. The aqueduct still stands today, though it is isolated in the middle of a field. This successful use of an iron trough to contain the water of a navigable aqueduct casts the Tern aqueduct in the role of Telford's prototype for the much longer Pontcysyllte Aqueduct on the Llangollen Canal, where he mounted the iron trough on high masonry arches.

The Shrewsbury Canal was finally finished in 1797, being 17 miles (27 km) long, with 11 locks. At Trench an inclined plane was built, which was 223 yards (204 m) long and raised boats 75 feet (23 m) up to the Wombridge Canal, from where they could travel via the Shropshire Canal southwards to the River Severn at Coalport. The plane consisted of twin railway tracks, each of which held a cradle. Boats would be floated onto the cradles, which had larger wheels at the back to keep the boat level. A third set of wheels were mounted at the front, which ran on extra rails in the dock, to prevent the cradle tipping forwards as it ran over the top cill. The plane opened in 1794, and although it was partially counterbalanced, with loaded boats going down the plane pulling empty boats up, a steam engine was also provided, to pull the boats over the top cill. This and the rails were provided by Reynolds' Coalbrookdale Company. In 1840 the rails were replaced with edge rails, allowing the use of conventional flanged wheels on the cradles, and the engine was replaced in 1842, with a high pressure Cornish engine, again ordered from the Coalbrookdale Company. The plane continued to be used until 1921, making it the last operational plane in Britain.

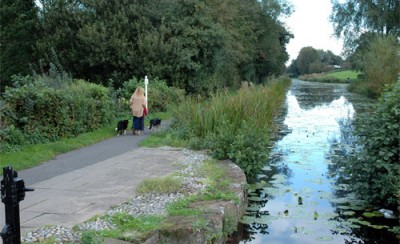
The canal in Newport

The canal included a 970-yard (890 m) tunnel at Berwick, which was 10 feet (3.0 m) wide, but included a wooden towpath, supported by bearers which were attached to the wall. Clowes designed the tunnel, but the addition of a towpath was suggested by Reynolds. The towpath lasted until 1819, when it was removed. By 1904, there was a white line painted in the middle of the tunnel, and if boats travelling in opposite directions met in the tunnel, the one which had passed the mark had right of way.

=== Operation ===
The canal was originally built as a narrow canal intended for horse-drawn trains of tub boats which were 20 feet (6.1 m) long and no wider than 6 ft 4 in (1.93 m). However, in preparation for the Newport branch of the Birmingham and Liverpool Junction Canal to Wappenshall the section from there to Shrewsbury was surveyed in 1831 and subsequently widened to take standard 7-foot (2.1 m) narrow boats. The costs of widening the bridge holes and the Eyton locks proved to be expensive, and plans to widen the section from Wappenshall to Trench were abandoned. With the opening of the Newport Branch in 1835, the Shrewsbury Canal was no longer isolated from the rest of the national canal network. This heralded the canal's most profitable period, though it was short-lived. The branch linked Norbury Junction to Wappenshall Junction, passing through Newport, and included 23 locks.

In 1844 the Humber Arm was constructed. This short branch ran to Lubstree Wharf, which was owned by the Duke of Sutherland. Tramways ran from the end of the branch to various works owned by the Lilleshall Company, who shipped cargoes of pig iron, coal and limestone for use as a flux in the production of iron. Much of this trade had previously used the Donnington Wood Canal, but the new arm provided a more direct connection to the canal network, and the transfer of trade was a factor in the closure of the Donnington Wood Canal.

Most of the traffic on the canal was coal, bound for Shrewsbury. Tolls were charged at 1 1/2d per ton per mile, with an extra 1d to use the inclined plane. This was high, compared to other canals, and the rate was reduced to 1d per ton per mile in 1797, while Reynolds was allowed to ship iron and other commodities toll-free for a time. However, in 1799, the company raised the tolls to 2d. This led to some discontent, with the local newspaper complaining that rather than reducing the price of coal, the townspeople were paying two to three shillings more per ton than before the canal had been built. The enterprise was prosperous, with dividends on the £125 shares rising to £8 in 1805, £10 in 1823 and £11 in 1929. Immediately after the opening of the Newport branch, they reached £16, but were back to £10 by 1843. The coal producers complained about the tolls in 1843, but the canal company argued that they were charging too much for the coal, and lower tolls would not improve the situation. However, tolls were reduced to 1 1/2d in 1844, and the producers reduced the price of coal by 2s 6d.

=== Decline ===
In May 1845, the amalgamation of the Birmingham and Liverpool Junction Canal and the Ellesmere and Chester Canal was authorised by the Ellesmere and Chester Canal Company Act 1845 (8 & 9 Vict. c. ii), and there were schemes to build railways throughout the area that they served. The railway engineer Robert Stephenson held a meeting on 24 July, at which he proposed further amalgamation of canal and railway interests, in order to make the task of obtaining authorising acts easier. In addition to the enlarged Ellesmere and Chester Canal, the Shropshire Union Railways and Canal Company would absorb the Montgomeryshire Canal, the Shrewsbury Canal and the Shropshire Canal. While many miles of waterway would be replaced by railway, some 80 to 90 miles (130–140 km) would be retained in water, which included the Ellesmere Port to Middlewich via Burbridge Junction section, the Shropshire Canal and the Shrewsbury Canal. Three acts of Parliament, the Shropshire Union Railways and Canal (Newton to Crewe with Branches) Act 1846 (9 & 10 Vict. c. cccxxiv), Shropshire Union Railways and Canal (Shrewsbury and Stafford Railway) Act 1846 (9 & 10 Vict. c. cccxxiii), and the Shropshire Union Railways and Canal (Chester and Wolverhampton Line) Act 1846 (9 & 10 Vict. c. cccxxii) were obtained, to enable railway construction, and extra clauses in the Shropshire Union Railways and Canal (Chester and Wolverhampton Line) Act 1846 enabled the name change to the Shropshire Union to be made, and in the Shropshire Union Railways and Canal (Shrewsbury and Stafford Railway) Act 1846 enabled the acquisition of the Shrewsbury Canal. At the time there were 500 shares in the Shrewsbury Canal, on which holders had paid £125, and these were valued at £150 each, which valued the canal at £75,000.

The first railway to be constructed was the Stafford to Shrewsbury Line, as it could be built quickly, and would be a great asset to the area. It was also stated that "its construction will not involve the loss of any revenue from the canals." Realignments of various railway companies resulted in the formation of the London and North Western Railway Company (LNWR) on 1 January 1846, and they saw the Shropshire Union scheme as a threat. They therefore offered to lease the Shropshire Union in late 1846, and an act of Parliament to authorise this was obtained in June 1847. Conditions of the lease, which was not fully completed until 25 March 1857, meant that the Shropshire Union dropped all plans for further railway expansion, but they were given a free hand to run the canals as they saw fit. However, Robert Skey, the canal manager, when he addressed a meeting in September 1861, noted that the carriage of general merchandise had suffered, as it had gradually transferred to the railways.

In 1870, a plan to reduce the costs of maintaining the Trench incline resulted in the company leasing Lubstree wharf from the third Duke of Sutherland. A new railway was built from the wharf to the Lilleshall Company works, and a wharfage charge of one halfpenny per ton for coal and other merchandise was agreed. The Shropshire Union set aside 30 boats to cope with the traffic, and in 1878 tolls for iron ore from Ellesmere Port to Lubstree were reduced, but by 1880, the only traffic on the Humber Arm was fluxing stone. In order to improve its use, the Shropshire Union agreed rates for carrying 300 to 400 tons of limestone and 100 to 150 tons of iron ore per week, and these measures were successful, as a further railway siding was built when the lease was renewed in 1891, and it was renewed for a further 14 years in 1905. Longdon-on-Tern Aqueduct was in a poor state of repair by 1899, when the company looked at closing the canal from Eyton to Shrewsbury, but the legal difficulties of a railway company closing a canal meant that it stayed open.

In its later years, the Trench incline had only carried grain upwards to Donnington Wood mill, and the incline was closed on 31 August 1921. In 1922, the London, Midland and Scottish Railway (LMS) took over the canal and the basin in Shrewsbury was closed. This action saved the cost of replacing the swing bridge at the basin entrance. Traffic on the Humber Arm ended in 1922, when the fifth Duke of Sutherland closed the wharf and the railway line to Lilleshall. No traffic used the canal to Shrewsbury after 1936, and a further section beyond Comet bridge was abandoned in 1939. Small volumes of coal were still reaching Longdon in 1939, and just 100 tons per year were recorded on the Newport Branch in 1943. The LMS finally abandoned the canal network in 1944, when they obtained the London Midland and Scottish Railway (Canals) Act 1944 (8 & 9 Geo. 6. c. ii) allowing that. The Shrewsbury Canal was just a small part of the 175 miles (282 km) abandoned under the 1944 act. Following the transfer of responsibility for the canal network to British Waterways in 1963, much of the route of the canal was sold to local landowners.

== Restoration ==
In 2000, the Shrewsbury Canal was the only one of the canals that formed part of the Shropshire Union Canal system which had no part open or under restoration. The Shrewsbury & Newport Canals Trust was created in that year to preserve and restore the waterway.

In 2007, the canalside buildings at Wappenshall, including a transshipment warehouse which has been little altered since it ceased to be used in the 1930s, and retains many original features, were put up for sale. They were eventually purchased, along with a length of the canal and the Wappenshall basin, by Telford and Wrekin Council, who are working with the Trust to allow repairs to the buildings to be undertaken, with the aim of providing a museum and heritage centre for the canal, a café, and offices for the Canals Trust.

In August 2015, work began on a short section of the canal to the east of Newport, between Forton Aqueduct and Skew Bridge. The channel at this location is still owned by the Canal and River Trust who supported the work by the Trust and the Waterway Recovery Group, which involves reprofiling the bed and laying a Bentonite lining, with a view to rewatering the section in the summer of 2016. The waterproof lining was supplied by the Inland Waterways Association.

== Route ==
The canal branched away from the Shropshire Union Canal at Norbury Junction, passing under a stone bridge which carried the Shropshire Union towpath over the branch. The bridge is a Grade II listed structure. The section to the first lock is still in water as it is used for moorings, while the first lock is used as a dry dock. The lock was the first in a flight of 17, which lowered the canal down the hillside as it passed through Oulton and to the south of Sutton and Forton. At the bottom of the flight, the canal and a minor road crossed the River Meese on the Forton Aqueduct, before passing under Skew Bridge which carries the road over the canal. The aqueduct is a scheduled ancient monument. The River Meese feeds the Aqualate Mere, which is a National Nature Reserve and the largest lake in the West Midlands region, covering 214.4 acres (86.8 ha). Soon afterwards, the route of the canal has been cut by the building of the A41 Newport bypass.

Beyond the bypass, Meretown lock marks the start of a 1 1/2-mile (2.4 km) watered section, which passes through Newport and included another five locks. The Strine Brook passes under the canal at both ends of this section, running parallel to the canal between the two aqueducts. The canal passed under Buttery Bridge, and then over Kinnersley Drive on an aqueduct, before the junction with the Humber Branch, which ran for about 1 mile (1.6 km) to the south, and served the industrial complex of Lilleshall. Two more aqueducts carried it over the Humber Brook and the Crow Brook, before the junction at Wappenshall where the new branch joined the original canal from Trench to Shrewsbury. At the junction, the warehouses, basin and a section of the canal have been bought by Telford and Wrekin Council, and include a Grade II Listed warehouse which straddled a dock, so that goods could be loaded and unloaded through trapdoors in the floor of the upper storey.

The Trench branch rose through nine locks from the junction, which were called Wappenshall, Britton, Wheat Leasowes, Shucks, Peaty, Hadley Park, Turnip, Baker's and Trench lock. Wappenshall Lock was demolished to make way for a weir which is part of a storm drain. Hadley Park and Turnip locks are Grade II listed structures, as is the bridge immediately downstream of Hadley Park lock, and both locks still have their original guillotine mechanism in situ. Beyond Trench lock, which was demolished in 1977 as part of a roadworks scheme, the Trench Pool was the main water supply for the canal, after which the Trench incline carried boats another 75 feet (23 m) upwards. The building of an incline, rather than a flight of locks was dictated by the lack of an adequate water supply at the higher level. The locks on the Trench Branch, and the two Eyton locks, had guillotine gates at the lower end. They were 81 feet (25 m) long, and although Thomas Telford wrote in 1797 that they had a third set of gates, so that they could be used by a single 20-foot (6.1 m) tub-boat in the short section, a train of three tub-boats in the longer section, or a train of four boats if the outer gates were used, there is no evidence that the middle gates were ever fitted.

After Wappenshall junction the canal dropped down through the two Eyton locks, which were widened when the Newport Branch was built, passing to the north of Eyton upon the Weald Moors and through Sleapford, before crossing the River Tern on the aqueduct at Longdon-on-Tern. The canal then headed south-west, skirting the southern edge of Rodington, where it crossed the River Roden on an aqueduct which was demolished in January 1971, and the eastern and southern edge of Withington, where there was a wharf. It passed under the Shrewsbury to Telford railway line south of Upton Magna, where the new line of the A5 road has blocked the line of the canal, to reach Berwick Wharf. Here it turned north-west, to enter the 970-yard (890 m) Berwick Tunnel. At the time of its construction, this was the longest canal tunnel in Britain, and the first equipped with a towpath through it. From the northern portal of the tunnel, it passed under the railway and the A5 road again, heading north to Uffington, after which it followed the large horseshoe bend in the River Severn to reach Shrewsbury where it terminated at Castle Foregate Basin adjacent to the Buttermarket building.

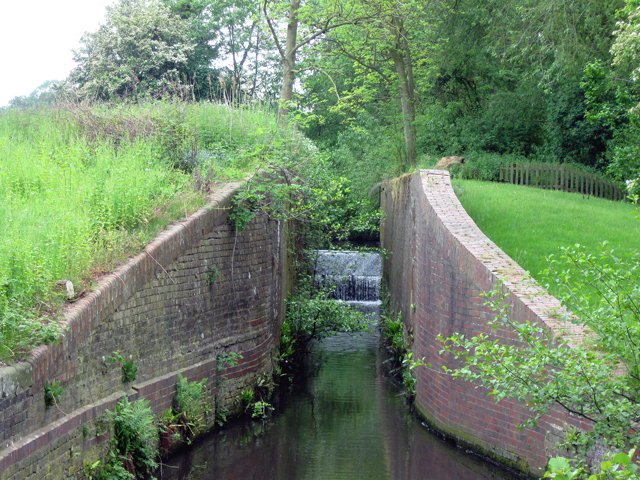
Old lock chamber at Eyton upon the Weald Moors

Point	Coordinates (Links to map resources)	OS Grid Ref	Notes
Norbury Junction	52.802°N 2.308°W	SJ793228	Shropshire Union Canal
Forton Aqueduct and Skew Bridge	52.786°N 2.362°W	SJ756209	
Meretown Lock	52.777°N 2.369°W	SJ752200	Start of watered section
Edgmond Lock	52.770°N 2.396°W	SJ734192	End of watered section
Humber Arm Junction	52.744°N 2.466°W	SJ686163	
Wappenshall Junction	52.728°N 2.501°W	SJ662145	
Trench Pool	52.709°N 2.466°W	SJ685124	Main water source
Longdon aqueduct	52.737°N 2.568°W	SJ617156	
River Roden aqueduct	52.724°N 2.610°W	SJ589141	
Withington Wharf	52.712°N 2.627°W	SJ577129	
A5 road blocks route	52.701°N 2.657°W	SJ556117	
South end of Berwick tunnel	52.699°N 2.685°W	SJ538114	
A49 bridge	52.725°N 2.708°W	SJ522144	
Shrewsbury basin	52.712°N 2.748°W	SJ495130	

== See also ==
- Canals of Great Britain
- History of the British canal system

== Bibliography ==
- Baggs, A P; et al. (1985). "Lilleshall: Communications". A History of the County of Shropshire. Vol. 11. Telford. Archived from the original on 5 October 2013.
- Clayton, Tony (21 May 2015a). "Wappenshall Lock – A Collection of Photographs". Archived from the original on 4 March 2016.
- Clayton, Tony (21 May 2015b). "Trench Lock – A Collection of Photographs". Archived from the original on 4 March 2016.
- Clayton, Tony (21 May 2015c). "Rodington Area – A Collection of Photographs". Archived from the original on 3 March 2016.
- de Salis, Henry (1904). Bradshaw's Canals and Navigable Waterways of England and Wales. Henry Blacklock.
- Hadfield, Charles (1985). The Canals of the West Midlands. David and Charles. ISBN 978-0-7153-8644-6.
- Nicholson (2006). Nicholson Guides Vol 4: Four Counties and the Welsh Canals. Harper Collins Publishers. ISBN 978-0-00-721112-8.
- Priestley, Joseph (1831). Historical Account of the Navigable Rivers, Canals, and Railways of Great Britain. Archived from the original on 8 March 2016.
- Ware, Michael E. (1989). Britain's Lost Waterways (2nd ed.). Moorland Publishing. ISBN 978-0-86190-327-6.
