= Josiah Clowes =

English civil engineer and canal builder

Josiah Clowes (1735–1794) was an English civil engineer and canal builder. His early years were spent running a canal carrying company with Hugh Henshall, and although he worked on some canal projects before 1783, that year marked his switch to being an engineer. His first major project included the Sapperton Tunnel on the Thames and Severn Canal, which despite huge engineering difficulties, gained him a reputation which enabled him to become the first great tunnelling engineer, responsible for three of the four longest canal tunnels built.

== Early life ==
Clowes was the youngest child of a family of six, and was born in North Staffordshire in 1735. His parents are believed to be William Clowes and Maria Whitlock. He also had an older brother called William, who was involved in coal mining at Whitfield, Norton and Sneyd Green, and it was through him that he met another partner in the business called Charles Bagnall. In late 1762 he married Bagnall's sister Elizabeth, and the marriage was witnessed by another canal engineer, Hugh Henshall. Elizabeth died less than eight weeks later, and was buried on 19 February 1763 at Norton.

Construction of the Trent and Mersey Canal began in 1766, and when its engineer James Brindley died in 1772, Henshall was given the post. Clowes worked as a contractor, as he advertised for labourers in 1775 to work on the project, and was probably involved in the construction of locks and of Harecastle Tunnel. He did not immediately take up engineering, even though the Chester Canal had asked him to work for them in 1776, but instead became a partner with Henshall in a canal carrying business, running boats on the Trent and Mersey Canal. The date of his second marriage to Margaret is not known, but is thought to be around this time.

== Engineering ==
After further approaches by the Chester Canal, he agreed to help them in 1778, becoming their 'general surveyor and overseer of the works'. He was to be paid £200 per year, and was initially involved with lock reconstruction. He then travelled to Gloucestershire, to assist Thomas Dadford, who was constructing locks for the Stroudwater Navigation. He appears to have still been involved in running Henshall's carrying company, and the Chester Canal decided that he was not giving sufficient attention to their business, and so dismissed him. His main focus over the next five years seems to have been the carrying company.

Clowes made the switch to engineering as a career in 1783, when he was appointed 'head engineer, surveyor and carpenter' to the Thames and Severn Canal, to assist Robert Whitworth. Together they laid out the route of the summit level, which included the Sapperton tunnel, at the time of its construction the longest in the world. Whitworth then seems to have left the project, leaving Clowes as resident engineer, for which he was paid £300 per year. The superintendent of the company, James Perry, oversaw the work, but although he was a good manager, he had no experience of canal construction and so Clowes' task was both difficult and onerous. The size of the tunnel was still under debate at this point, and it was not until September 1783 that the decision was made to build a tunnel suitable for broad-beamed boats, rather than narrow boats.

There were major problems with the construction of the tunnel, as parts of it passed through Fuller's earth, which swelled up when it got wet, causing the ground to move. Water leaked into the tunnel from above, and springs came through from below. The leaks from above proved very difficult to seal, and the problem of springs was not finally resolved until 1790, when Robert Mylne found a solution. Clowes also had problems with a contractor, and pleaded with the proprietors to find someone who understood canal navigations. The tunnel took around five and a half years to complete, and one of Clowes' innovations was a driving frame, which may have included movable centring, to assist in the tunnelling. Although he left the construction of the canal in 1789 shortly before its completion, his work on the 3,817-yard (3,490 m) tunnel gained him good reports from other engineers, including Whitworth, John Smeaton and a French engineer called Dupin, which made him highly sought after in the final years of his career.

He left the Thames and Severn Canal to work on Dudley Tunnel, which was 3,172 yards (2,900 m) long, but had problems with misalignment. He was paid one and a half guineas (£1.57) a day, plus expenses, and worked for two years, completing both the tunnel and a reservoir at Gads Green.

== Consultancy ==
By this time Clowes was quite rich, and acted in a consultative capacity, as well as continuing with engineering projects. In 1791 he gave evidence on three projects to the House of Commons. These were the Leominster Canal, the Worcester and Birmingham Canal, (which he had surveyed with John Snape), and improvements to navigation on the upper reaches of the River Thames. He surveyed the line for the Hereford and Gloucester Canal, and was also involved in its engineering, as it included a 2,192-yard (2,004 m) tunnel at Oxenhall. The tunnel was recommended by Henshall and Whitworth, and Clowes used gin wheels from the Sapperton tunnel to assist the work. Next he was asked by the Leeds and Liverpool Canal to assess their summit level, as they thought Whitworth had made errors. He reported that although a shorter tunnel could have been made, the completion of Whitworth's line was by then the most sensible plan. He received another request to survey the Worcester and Birmingham Canal, but had to decline, due to his volume of work.

The Worcester and Birmingham Canal continued their attempts to entice him by flattery, and in January 1792 he became their consultant, for which he received 29 guineas (£30.45) per day. Surveys of the Stratford-on-Avon Canal and the Dudley No. 2 Canal followed. On the first he acted as engineer for the 352-yard (322 m) Brandwood Tunnel, while on the second, there were over 5 miles (8.0 km) of tunnels, including the Lappal Tunnel, at 3,795 yards (3,470 m), which passed underneath the California coal mines. He died before it was finished, and its excavation was completed by William Underhill.

In 1792, he carried out a survey for the Gloucester and Berkeley Canal, which became the Gloucester and Sharpness Canal, when work began the following year, although the plans were modified by Robert Mylne. At the time, he was also working for five other canal companies, on projects which were all completed after his death. The Ledbury to Gloucester section of the Herefordshire and Gloucestershire Canal was not finally linked to Hereford until 1845. The Worcester and Birmingham Canal was completed by William Cartwright in 1815. His work on the Shrewsbury Canal included the 970-yard (890 m) Berwick Tunnel, with a wooden towpath cantilevered from the side wall, and an aqueduct at Longdon on Tern, which was swept away by floods in 1795 and replaced by Thomas Telford with a cast iron design, one of the first to use this material. Telford completed the canal construction in 1796. The Blower's Green Junction to Selly Oak section of the Dudley No. 2 Canal was completed in 1798, while the Kings Norton to Kingswood section of the Stratford-on-Avon Canal was completed in 1916. In 1794, he advised the Stroudwater Canal on improvements to the junction with the River Severn.

== Legacy ==
Clowes was at Middlewich, Cheshire, when he died in late 1794, and was buried in St. Bartholomew's churchyard, Norton le Moors, North Staffordshire on 1 January 1795, next to his first wife, where his memorial can still be seen. His second wife died shortly afterwards, and was also buried with him. He left a large estate, which was inherited by his nephew William Clowes after the death of Margaret, as they had no children of their own.

His contribution to the canal system was huge, and since he was responsible for three of the four longest canal tunnels built, he was probably the first great tunnelling engineer. Although it is not certain, he was probably also consulted on the Standedge Tunnel prior to its construction.

== See also ==
- Canals of the United Kingdom
- History of the British canal system

== Bibliography ==
- Hadfield, Charles (1969). The Canals of South and South East England. David and Charles. ISBN 0-7153-4693-8.
- Hadfield, Charles (1985). The Canals of the West Midlands. David and Charles. ISBN 0-7153-8644-1.
- Skempton, Sir Alec; et al. (2002). A Biographical Dictionary of Civil Engineers in Great Britain and Ireland: Vol 1: 1500 to 1830. Thomas Telford. ISBN 0-7277-2939-X.
