= Benjamin Outram =

British civil engineer and industrialist (1764 - 1805)

- Born: 1 April 1764; Alfreton, Derbyshire, England
- Died: 22 May 1805 (age 41); London, England
- Citizenship: British
- Occupations: Civil engineer; surveyor; industrialist

Benjamin Outram (1 April 1764 – 22 May 1805) was an English civil engineer, surveyor and industrialist. He was a pioneer in the building of canals and tramways.

== Life ==
Born at Alfreton in Derbyshire, he began his career assisting his father Joseph Outram, who described himself as an "agriculturalist", but was also a land agent, an enclosure commissioner arbitrating in the many disputes which arose from the inclosure acts, an advisor on land management, a surveyor for new mines and served as a turnpike trustee.

In 1792 his neighbour George Morewood died and left his estates to Ellen Morewood. She was mining under Outram land. Over the next nine years the Outrams engaged in a legal battle with her. Land had been sold to them by the Morewoods but Ellen believed that she still had the rights to the coal and ironstone beneath them. James and Benjamin Outram disagreed and they appealed and in 1803 the Lord Chief Justice of the King's Bench, Lord Ellenborough agreed with them.

In 1803 he had a son, James Outram, who became a general in the Indian Army and was later knighted.

He died of a "brain fever" (a term used for several illnesses including meningitis and encephalitis) while visiting London in 1805. After his death, and some considerable litigation, in 1807 Benjamin Outram and Company was renamed the Butterley Company.

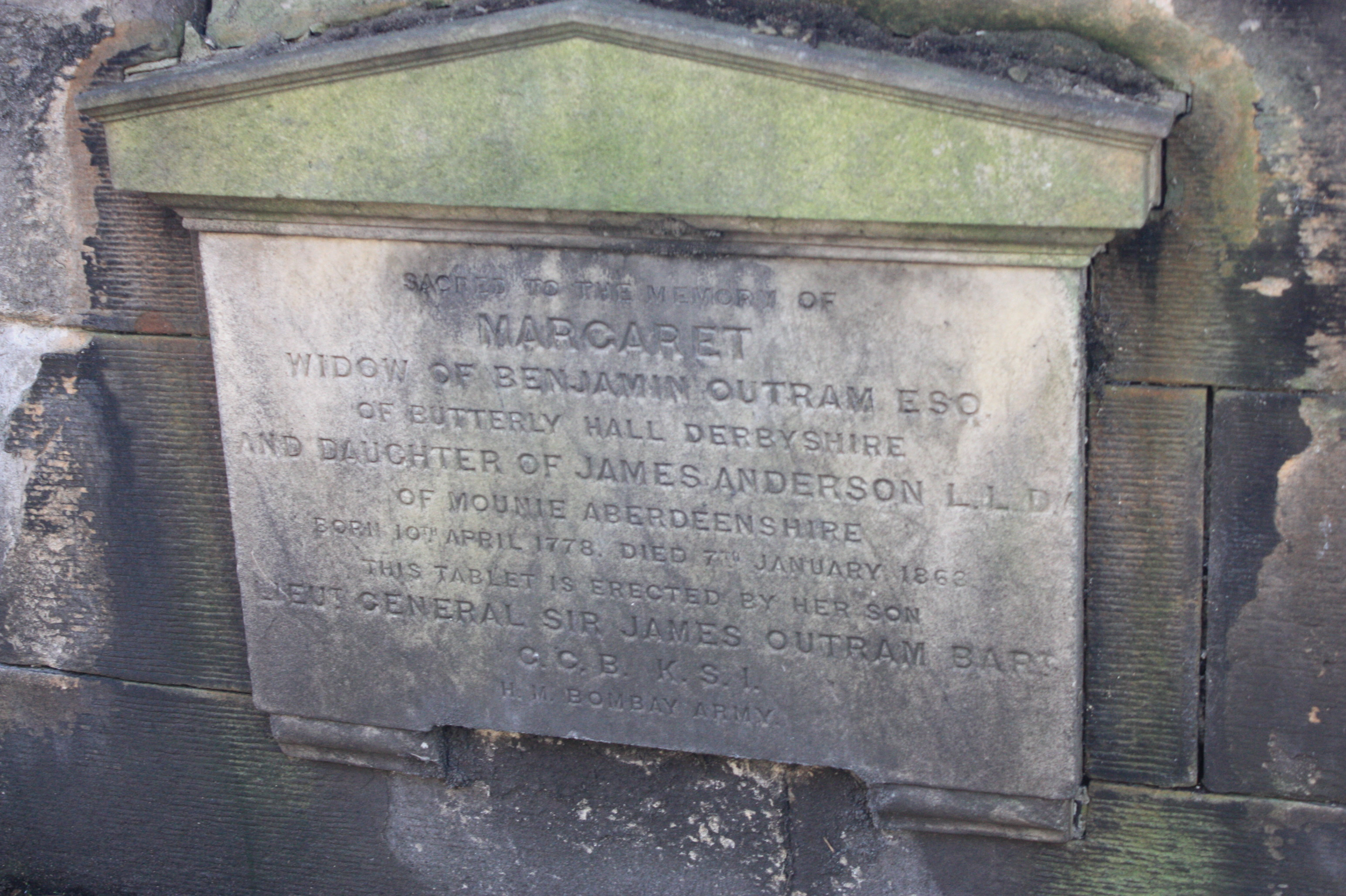
The grave of Margaret Outram, St Johns, Edinburgh

After his death, his wife Margaret (1778–1863), daughter of James Anderson, wrote that Outram "was hasty in his temper, feeling his own superiority over others. Accustomed to command, he had little toleration for stupidity and slowness, and none for meanness or littleness of any kind."

In spite of his prowess, Outram's wife and family were for a while reduced to near poverty after his death until his liabilities could be settled through the courts. She died in Edinburgh and is buried in St John's churchyard in one of the lower terraces.

== Career ==
=== Early career ===
Joseph Outram was a promoter of the Cromford Canal, and when William Jessop was approached to design and build it he found an able assistant in 24-year-old Benjamin. Construction of the canal, particularly Butterley Tunnel, revealed substantial mineral deposits. The neighbouring Butterley Hall and its 200-acre (0.81 km^{2}) estate came on the market at this time and Francis Beresford, solicitor to the canal company, bought the freehold of the hall and its estate. He leased it on a moiety to Outram until the latter had acquired enough capital for a fifty per cent holding.

=== Established canal and railway engineer ===
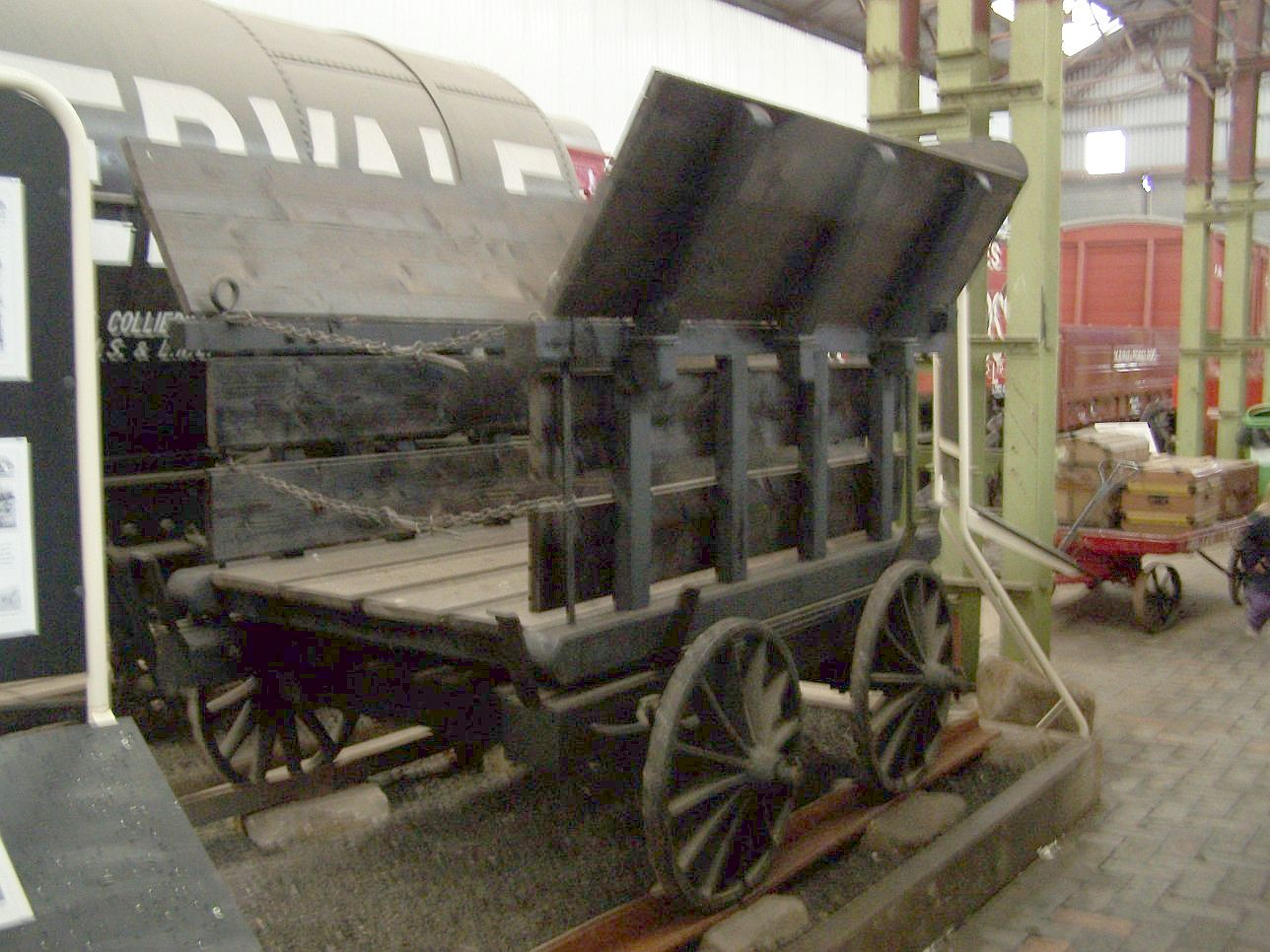
A replica of a "Little Eaton Tramway" wagon

This was the beginning of the ironworks, "Benjamin Outram & Company" which began trading in 1790. The following year William Jessop and John Wright, a Nottingham banker, also became partners. Starting with a nominal capital of £6000, Outram was the only partner active in the management of the company, assisted by his younger brother, Joseph. Over time the business expanded to include a limestone quarry, limekilns, collieries and ironstone pits.

Outram became a leading advocate in the construction of tramways using L-section rails, which along with the wagons were manufactured at his Butterley Ironworks. His first tramway was a line slightly over 1 mile (1.6 km) in length, built to carry limestone from quarries at Crich to Bullbridge Wharf on the Cromford Canal, for use by his works.

In 1792 he became engineer for the Nottingham Canal and in 1793 the Derby Canal, working in the meantime on the Nutbrook Canal.

One of his major works was the 44 feet (13 m) long single-span Holmes Aqueduct on the Derby Canal, which opened in February 1796 and was one of the first cast-iron aqueducts. It was cast by Benjamin Outram & Company and predated Longdon-on-Tern Aqueduct, Thomas Telford's longer aqueduct on the Shrewsbury Canal at Longdon-on-Tern by one month. It proved troublesome and needed substantial remedial work in 1802, 1812 and 1930, eventually being demolished in 1971.

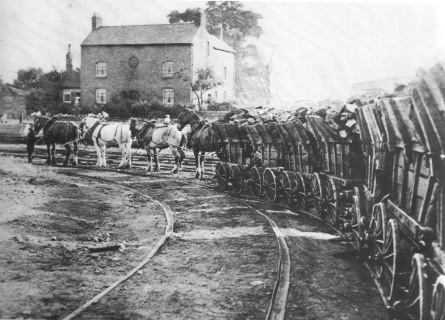
The Little Eaton Gangway

An important extension to the Derby Canal was the Little Eaton Gangway, a feeder for the Derby Canal built on the pattern of that at Crich. Such tramways became an important part of his later canals. A common misconception is that the word "tramway" comes from Outram's surname but the word actually derives from the Low German word "traam" meaning "a beam" (of a wheelbarrow). Outram always referred to tramways as railways.

Outram was the consulting engineer for the construction of the Huddersfield Narrow Canal, which included the pioneering Standedge Canal Tunnel. In 1794 he was the engineer for the Peak Forest Canal, which included the Marple Aqueduct. The climb from Bugsworth was negotiated by the 6 miles (9.7 km) Peak Forest Tramway. Stodhart Tunnel on this tramway is believed to be the first railway tunnel in Derbyshire. In 1796 he reported on the extra funds needed to complete construction of the Manchester, Bolton and Bury Canal. In 1798, he was retained to complete the final section of the Ashton Canal which included the Store Street Aqueduct, among the first to solve the problem of skew arches.

Outram also built railways for the Ashby-de-la-Zouch Canal such as the Ticknall Tramway and was asked to advise on railways for the Monmouthshire & Brecon Canal. He predicted within a few years of their introduction that railways would become the principal mode of transport. In 1799 he wrote, while building the Ashby-de-la-Zouch Canal railway at four-foot two-inch gauge, "it appears that many hogsheads and packages require carriages:... wider than those at Derby and Crich" and "it seems desirable that all extensive railways should be of the same width and that width should be sufficient to suit all the purposes of trade".

His sudden death, leaving no will, led to considerable confusion in resolving the company's affairs, moreover certain investments had not yet started to yield income, and it was not until 1815 that the company's affairs and liabilities with his wife and family were settled.

== See also ==
- Canal
- Little Eaton Gangway
- Narrowboat
- National Tramway Museum
- Peak Forest Tramway
- Ticknall
