= Standedge Tunnels =

Tunnels between Marsden and Diggle in northern England

Standedge Canal Tunnel
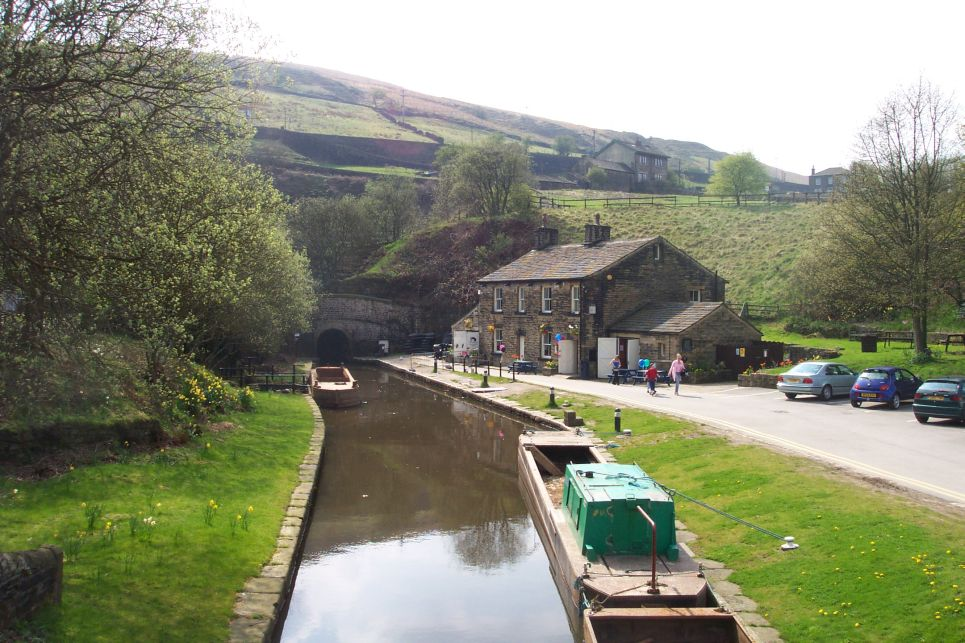
- Tunnel End Cottages and the canal portal at Marsden
- Interactive map of Standedge Canal Tunnel

Overview
- Location: Standedge
- Coordinates: 53°35′12″N 01°57′57″W
- OS grid reference: SE026105
- Status: Open
- Waterway: Huddersfield Narrow Canal
- Start: 53°34′04.6″N 01°59′32.7″W
- End: 53°36′13.5″N 01°56′29.9″W

Operation
- Constructed: 1794–1811
- Opened: 1811
- Closed: 1944
- Rebuilt: 2001
- Owner: Canal & River Trust

Technical
- Design engineer: Nicholas Brown; Thomas Telford
- Length: 5,675 yards (5,189 m)
- Towpath: No
- Boat-passable: Yes (with permission)

The Standedge Tunnels (/stænɪdʒ/) are four parallel tunnels through the Pennine hills at the Standedge crossing between Marsden in Kirklees, West Yorkshire and Diggle in Oldham, Greater Manchester in northern England. Three are railway tunnels (containing the Huddersfield line) and the other is a canal tunnel. Before boundary changes in 1974, both ends of the tunnels were in the West Riding of Yorkshire.

The canal tunnel on the Huddersfield Narrow Canal was authorised by the Huddersfield to Ashton-under-Lyne Canal Act 1794 (34 Geo. 3. c. 53) on 4 April 1794. Construction of a 5,451-yard (4,984 m) tunnel began months later. Within two years, cost-saving measures pushed back its completion date and progress was slowed by water levels much greater than had been expected. It proved difficult to secure skilled help, some tenders went unanswered and Benjamin Outram withdrew from the venture. In 1807, Thomas Telford drew up a new plan for its completion. In 1811, the tunnel opened. It is the longest and oldest of the four Standedge tunnels and is the longest, highest, and deepest canal tunnel in the United Kingdom. Having been closed to all traffic in 1943, the canal tunnel was re-opened in May 2001.

The first, single-track railway tunnel, built for the London and North Western Railway (LNWR) on its line between Huddersfield and Manchester, was completed in 1848. It proved to have insufficient capacity and a second, parallel, single-track tunnel was opened in 1871. The LNWR opened a third, double-track tunnel in 1894. Only the double-track tunnel is currently used for rail traffic; the other two are intact but disused.

All four tunnels are linked by cross-tunnels or adits at strategic intervals which allowed the railway tunnels to be built without construction shafts and allowed waste material to be removed by boat. The Standedge Tunnel Visitor Centre, at the Marsden end, is a base for boat trips into the tunnel and has an exhibition depicting the different crossings.

== Canal tunnel ==
=== Construction ===
On 4 April 1794, construction of the Huddersfield Narrow Canal (then known as the Huddersfield Canal), linking Ashton-under-Lyne and Huddersfield via a tunnel, was authorised by the Huddersfield to Ashton-under-Lyne Canal Act 1794 (34 Geo. 3. c. 53). Benjamin Outram was appointed the consulting engineer after his report in October 1793 estimated the cost of the canal and tunnel at £178,478. Nicholas Brown surveyed the route. Outram thought that geology of the hill through which the tunnel would pass was of gritstone and shale, and would not present any difficulties. Work on the 5,456-yard (4,989 m) tunnel would start at a dip in the hill at Red Brook and the tunnel would be driven simultaneously from both ends. Steam engines would keep the works drained during construction.

Outram was the site engineer and Brown was superintendent and surveyor. During July 1795, John Evans was appointed to manage boring the tunnel. By mid-1796, 795 yards (727 m) of tunnel had been cut, some of which had been lined. Considerable effort had been spent constructing small tunnels to supply waterwheels to raise spoil and water from intermediate adits. By the autumn, concerned that such work was expensive, Outram abandoned building extra workfaces and concentrated on boring out from both ends. While this was cheaper, the completion date was extended.

Other factors had slowed progress: a shortage of funding and poor working practices also contributed. Cutbacks in drainage provision hampered tunnelling, as larger quantities of water entered the workings. In September 1797, Outram advised the committee that Thomas Lee, the contractor, had made large losses as a result of the difficulties and could not complete his contract. He was awarded more money for timber, an increased rate per yard for completion and an extra year in which to finish the tunnel.

By mid-1799, 1,000 yards (910 m) of the tunnel had been finished and 1,000 yards (910 m) had been excavated, but not completed. In October 1800, the Peak Forest Canal Company, who were keen to trade, suggested a tram road should be built to bypass the tunnel until it was completed, but no action was taken. The next tunnel contract failed to attract any takers and canal engineer John Varley, who had repaired parts of the canal which had been damaged by floods, was invited to work on the tunnel. Soon thereafter, mine owner Matthew Fletcher was asked for his opinion; he suggested that time could be saved by tunnelling in both directions from Redbrook pit, which was kept dry by a large steam engine. He estimated that it would cost £8,000, but a contractor could not be found and tunnelling continued from both ends.

In 1801, Outram resigned after work had stopped for a lengthy period. Brown was dismissed. In late 1804, a sub-committee visited Harecastle Tunnel on the Trent and Mersey Canal, Butterley Tunnel on the Cromford Canal and the Norwood Tunnel on the Chesterfield Canal. It recommended that a towing path should be built through the tunnel, but the extra cost and delay were not affordable. Desperately short of money, the canal company obtained a new act of Parliament, the Huddersfield Narrow Canal Act 1806 (46 Geo. 3. c. xii), to raise additional finance and allow an extra toll for using the tunnel. In 1807, Thomas Telford was asked for his advice. He produced a plan, which was followed until the work was completed.

On 9 June 1809, both ends of the tunnel met. On 10 December 1810, the first boat passed through. On 26 March 1811, the tunnel was complete and a grand opening ceremony was held on 4 April; a party of invited guests, followed by several working boats, entered the tunnel at Diggle and completed the journey to Marsden in one hour and forty minutes. The tunnel had cost £160,000, making it the most expensive canal tunnel to have been built in Britain. It was also the longest, deepest and highest. The tunnel was 5,445 yards (4,979 m) long, 636 feet (194 m) underground at its deepest point, and 643 feet (196 m) above sea level. It was extended at the Marsden end in 1822 by 11 yards (10 m), when Tunnel End Reservoir's overflow was diverted over the tunnel mouth. The tunnel was also extended at the Diggle end in 1893 by 242 yards (221 m) to accommodate the 1894 rail tunnel. The extensions made the tunnel 5,698 yards (5,210 m) long. A survey carried out before restoration using a modern measuring system gave the length as 5,675 yards (5,189 m), which is the accepted figure.

=== Operation ===
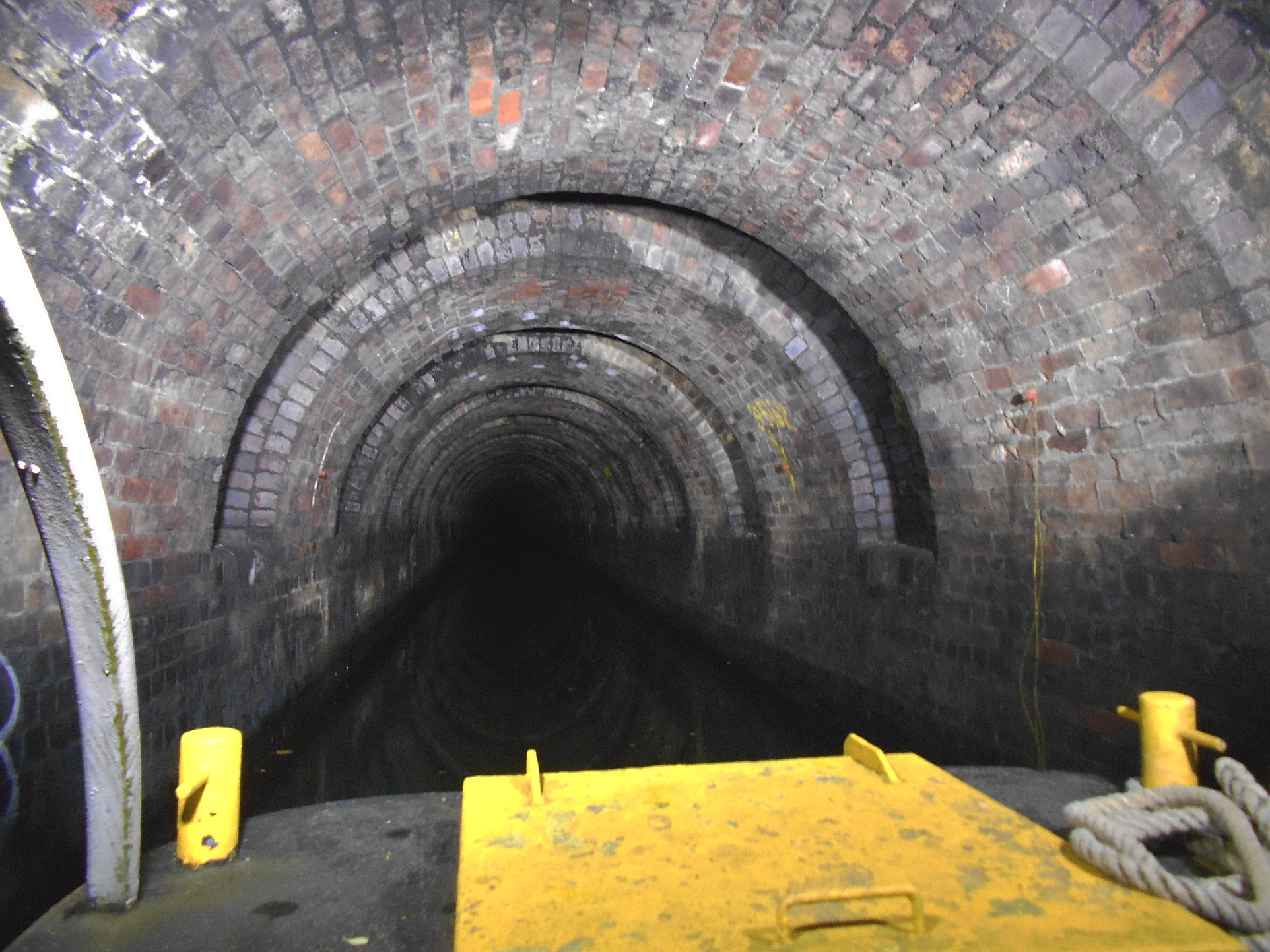
Inside the canal tunnel

When the tunnel opened, the canal became a through route, 13 years after the rest of the canal had been completed and 17 years after work began, at a total cost of £123,803. Despite multiple problems, its construction showed that the technique of quantity surveying had advanced. Telford's plan covered every eventuality and was followed until the canal opened. Between 1811 and 1840, the tunnel was used on average by 40 boats daily. The tunnel is brick-lined in some places, though some sections of bare rock were left exposed.

The tunnel is only wide enough for one narrowboat for much of its length and, to save on cost, a towpath was not provided. Canal boats were horse-drawn when it opened and the boats were legged through the tunnel – one or more boatmen lay on the cargo and pushed against the roof or walls of the tunnel with their legs. Professional leggers were paid one shilling and sixpence for working a boat through the tunnel, which took one hour and twenty minutes for an empty boat and three hours with a full load. The limited load capacity and the lack of a towpath damaged the competitiveness of the whole canal when compared to the rival Rochdale Canal, which was only a few miles to the north and competed with the Huddersfield Canal for business.

Although there were widened passing places in the tunnel for handling bi-directional traffic, intense competition between boat crews was a hindrance and two-way operation in the tunnel was impractical. The canal company introduced one-way working, for which one end of the tunnel was closed by a locked chain to prevent access unless authorised. A similar arrangement remains in use.

In 1846, the Huddersfield Narrow Canal was purchased by the Huddersfield and Manchester Railway. The canal tunnel was used during the construction of the first railway tunnel and no shafts were needed. The canal provided an easy means of removing the excavated spoil. When the railway tunnel was completed, several cross passages were retained.

The last commercial boat passed through the tunnel in 1921 and the canal was closed to traffic in 1944 when maintenance ended and the tunnel fell into a state of disrepair. The last boat to pass through the tunnel before its restoration was the Rolt/Aickman expedition in the Ailsa Craig in 1948. Writing in 1948, L. T. C. Rolt described the journey as taking two hours, during which the speed was kept very low to avoid damage to the boat.

The canal had become obstructed in several places on both sides of the Pennines and the tunnel, which had become unsafe, was closed by large iron gates at each end. A local newspaper described a trip organised by the Railway and Canal Historical Society during 1961, which was held to commemorate 150 years since the canal's opening. The expedition used a single narrowboat, which departed Marsden around 11 a.m. and emerged from the Diggle portal around 1 p.m.

=== Restoration ===
The canal and tunnel benefitted from a £5 million restoration project to re-open the canal. Several rock-lined parts of the tunnel were stabilised by rock bolts where possible and concrete was used to stabilise the rock face where this was impractical. In May 2001, the tunnel was re-opened to traffic. Most modern canal boats are diesel-powered and it was considered unsafe for boaters to navigate the tunnel using diesel power because of its length and the lack of ventilation, so electric tug boats haul the narrowboats through. Since the 2009 season, boats have been allowed to travel through the tunnel under their own power with an experienced chaperone on board to guide its passage, followed by a service vehicle through one of the parallel disused railway tunnels. On 28 June 2024, the Canal & River Trust (CRT) began guided canoe tours through the tunnel for the first time in 200 years, charging £100 for two people in a tandem canoe or £55 for a solo paddler. The trust has stated that the cash raised from the trips would help to maintain the canal network.

== Railway tunnels ==
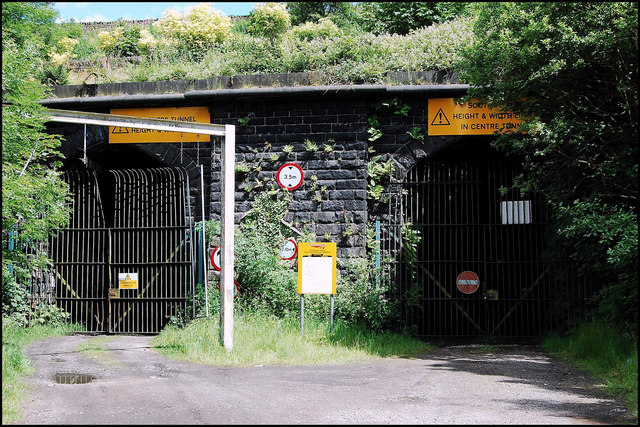
The 1848 and 1871 tunnel portals at Diggle

Three railway tunnels run parallel to each other and the canal tunnel. Through them runs the Huddersfield line. They are level for the whole length, which had the operational benefit of providing the only section of level track on the line where water troughs could be installed to provide steam locomotives with water without requiring the train to stop. Both the single-track bores have ventilation shafts at Cote, Flint and Pule Hill, and the double-track tunnel is ventilated via three shafts at Brunn Clough, Redbrook and Flint. Drainage adits interlink with one another, including the canal tunnel, into which water is discharged.

In 1846, work commenced on a railway tunnel for the Huddersfield and Manchester Railway. It ran parallel to, and to the south of, the canal tunnel at a slightly higher level. From the canal tunnel, thirteen adits were driven to facilitate excavating the railway tunnel. The railway company had bought the canal company to provide access. Boats transferred excavated spoil and moved construction materials. Canal access increased the rate of construction, which took a little over two years; in comparison, the Woodhead Tunnel, which was slightly shorter, took seven years to build despite the work being done by the same contractor, Thomas Nicholson.

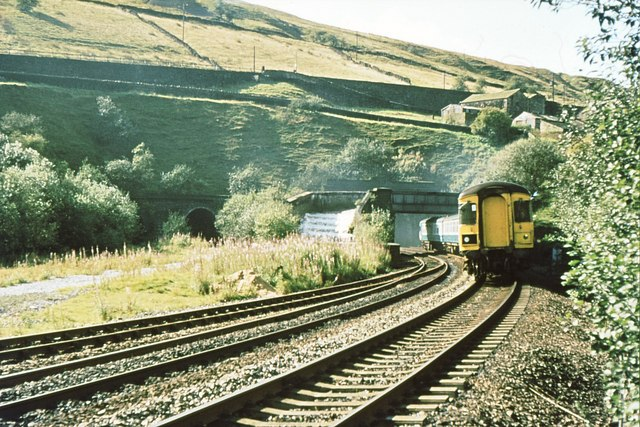
The eastern portals of the tunnels

The tunnel was driven and lined by up to 1,953 navvies working 36 faces. The tunnel advanced at up to 85 yards (78 m) per week. Nine men died during its construction. In 1848, the central single-track tunnel was completed by the London and North Western Railway (L&NWR), who had acquired the Huddersfield and Manchester Railway midway through its construction. Costing £201,608, the tunnel is 3 miles 57 yards (4,880 m) long. When opened, trains were accompanied through the tunnel by a pilot man or pilot engine and their re-emergence was communicated between signal boxes situated at either end by a telegraph system devised by Henry Highton.

The 1848 tunnel soon became a bottleneck for rail traffic between Huddersfield and Manchester. Even before its completion, plans were in consideration for a second tunnel alongside it. When the economic case became clear, Thomas Nelson, who built the first railway tunnel, was awarded the contract. As with the first tunnel, the canal tunnel was linked to the second by 21 adits which passed underneath Nicholson's tunnel, allowing spoil to be removed by boat. Construction was disrupted by strike action by tunnellers and bricklayers over disputes about payment and shift length. In February 1871, the 3-mile-57-yard (4,880 m) second rail tunnel, south of the first, was opened.

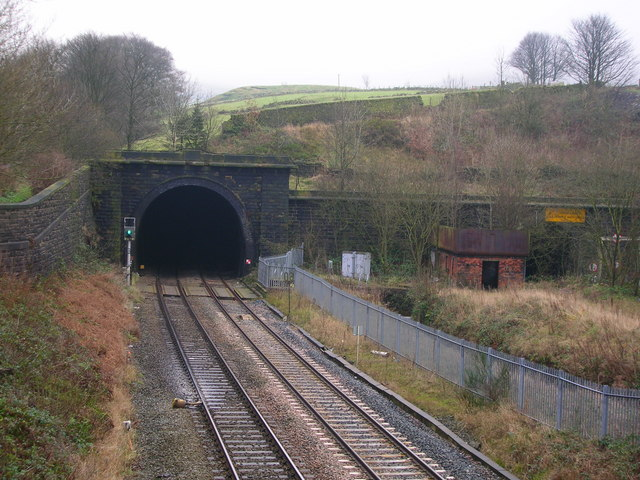
Diggle portal of the 1894 tunnel

Even two tunnels could not provide sufficient capacity to satisfy demand and in 1890, the L&NWR embarked on providing four tracks on most of the line which required constructing a new twin-track tunnel.

Construction was done under the guidance of A. A. MacGregor and carried out by 1,800 men who lived in the paper mills at Diggle and 54 wooden huts near the eastern side. Once again the tunnel was driven from adits, this time 13 adits were connected to the first railway tunnel. The canal tunnel was extended at the Diggle end to accommodate the third rail tunnel, which ran close past it. For most of its length, the new bore is to the north of the canal tunnel, but passes over the canal tunnel just inside each tunnel entrance. When the work was completed, the tunnel was 3 miles 60 yards (4,883 m) long. To speed the excavation, 40 breakups were opened using around 120 long tons (120 t) of gelignite. About 25 million bricks, mostly produced locally, were used in the tunnel lining.

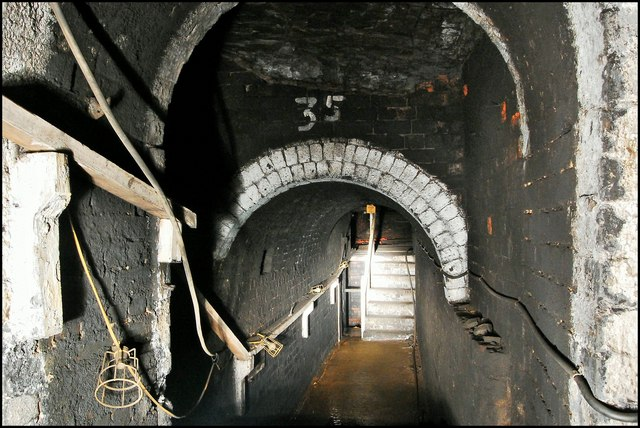
One of the connecting passageways between tunnels

A 26-foot (7.9 m) unlined section of tunnel collapsed in April 1894 blocking the tunnel for a week. On 1 August 1894, the new tunnel was passed for use by inspector Major Yorke. The opening of the double-track tunnel provided additional capacity for the L&NWR, allowing them to temporarily close the single bores for maintenance. As of 2018, excluding the London Underground, the double-track bore is the fifth-longest UK rail tunnel, after the High Speed 1 tunnels for the Thames Estuary and English Channel, the Severn Tunnel on the Great Western Main Line, and the Totley Tunnel on the Sheffield to Manchester route.

Only the 1894 rail tunnel is in use but all three rail tunnels are maintained. In 1966, the 1848 single-track rail tunnel was closed followed by the 1871 single-track tunnel in 1970. The 1848 tunnel provides an emergency escape route for the other tunnels and has been made accessible to road vehicles such as fire engines and ambulances. Both the 1848 and 1871 tunnel are used by maintenance personnel for access. During the 2000s, Network Rail proposed reinstating rail traffic through the 1848 and 1871 tunnels to increase capacity on the Leeds–Manchester Transpennine route, but a reappraisal in 2012 following the decision to electrify the Transpennine line found that reinstatement would not be necessary.

== Incidents ==
On Sunday morning, 25 January 2026, a fire broke out and West Yorkshire Fire and Rescue were alerted at 06:08. The fire involved a piece of heavy railway equipment. Firefighting efforts also involved crews from Greater Manchester Fire and Rescue. The incident closed both lines affecting services between Huddersfield and Manchester Victoria involving mostly Transpennine Express and Northern Trains. The disruption was expected to continue until 27 January 2026. The tunnel reopened on 29 January 2026.

== Visitor centre ==
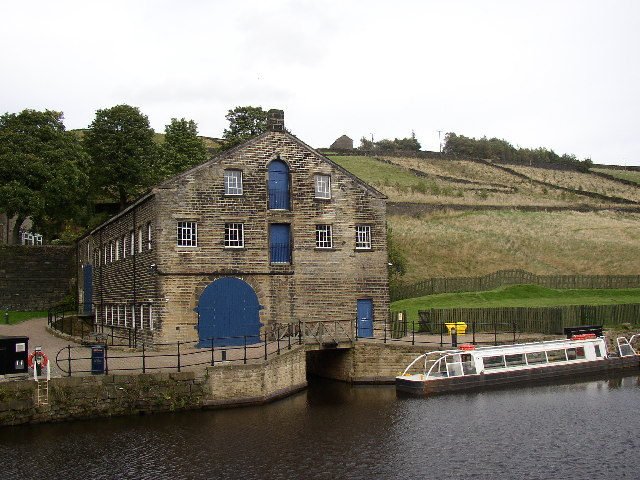
The warehouse that now houses the visitor centre

The Standedge Tunnel Visitor Centre at the Marsden end of the tunnel is in the former warehouse, used for transshipment of goods from canal barge to packhorse between 1798 when the canal reached Marsden, and 1811 when the tunnel opened. The centre contains exhibitions on the history of the tunnels, the canal tunnel's recent restoration and the Huddersfield Narrow Canal. Tunnel End Cottages, which once housed canal maintenance workers, houses a café and the booking office for canal tunnel trips.

The visitor centre is about half a mile (0.8 km) west of Marsden railway station, reached via the canal towpath. Next to the station are the headquarters of the National Trust's Marsden Moor Estate which has a public exhibition, "Welcome to Marsden", that gives an overview of the area and its transport history.

== See also ==
- Canals of Great Britain
- History of the British canal system

Records
Preceded by Sapperton Canal Tunnel	Longest tunnel 1811–1871	Succeeded by Fréjus Rail Tunnel
