= John Varley (canal engineer) =

English canal engineer (1740–1809)

John Varley (8 June 1740 – 16 February 1809) was an English engineer. He was born in Heanor, Derbyshire, and was responsible for the construction of the Chesterfield and Erewash Canals. He died in 1809 and is buried at All Saints Church, Harthill, Derbyshire.

== Early life ==
John Varley was born on 8 June 1740 to Francis Varley (1719–1789) and Rebekah Varley in Heanor, Derbyshire. He married Hannah Pattern (1752 – c. 1784) on 13 March 1770.

== Early canal engineering ==
James Brindley appointed John Varley as an assistant. The proposed canal from the River Don to Cinderbridge was surveyed by John Varley.

== Chesterfield Canal ==
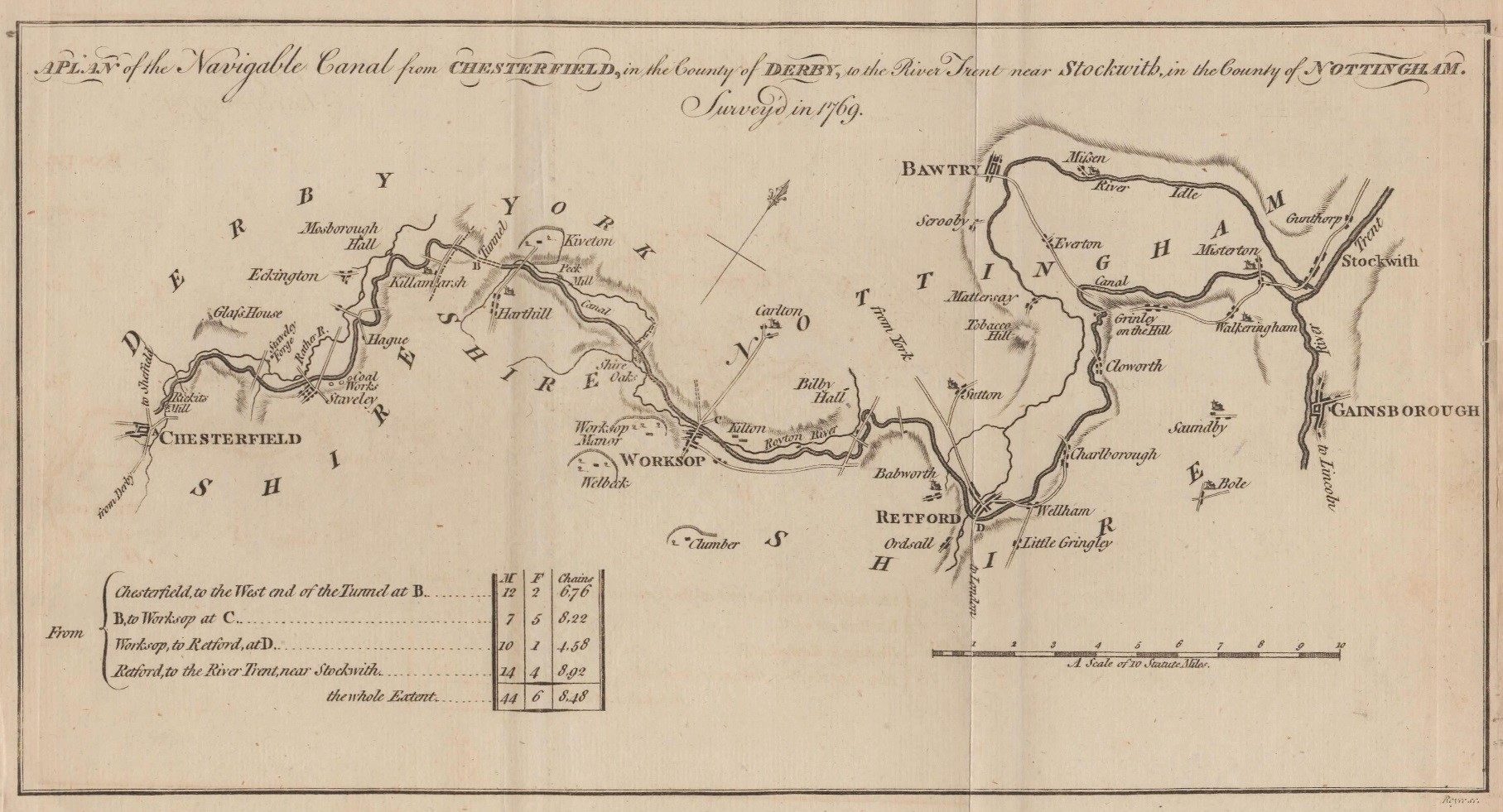
The Chesterfield Canal surveyed in 1769. Published in the Gentleman's Magazine in 1777.

The route of the Chesterfield Canal was surveyed by James Brindley and John Varley, who estimated the cost at £94,908 17s. Brindley presented his proposals to a meeting in Worksop on 24 August 1769. An application was made to Parliament and the Chesterfield to Stockwith (Trent) Canal Act 1771 (11 Geo. 3. c. 75) received the royal assent on 28 March 1771, entitled An Act for making a navigable Cut or Canal from Chesterfield, in the county of Derby, through or near Worksop and Retford, to join the River Trent, at or near Stockwith, in the county of Nottingham. The promoters consisted of one hundred and seventy-four persons, amongst whom were the Duke of Devonshire, the Duke of Newcastle, Lord Scarsdale, the Dean of York, and Sir Cecil Wray. They were incorporated by the name of The Company of Proprietors of the Canal Navigation from Chesterfield to the River Trent, and empowered to raise among themselves the sum of £100,000, in one thousand shares of £100 each, to fund the construction. Immediately on the passing of the act, construction began under the direction of Brindley. Upon his death in September 1772, John Varley moved from Clerk of Works to Resident Engineer with Hugh Henshall, Brindley's brother-in-law, appointed Chief Engineer in 1773. The canal was to be built as a narrow canal, but in 1775, nine shareholders offered to fund the extra cost of making it a broad canal from Retford to Stockwith. Retford Corporation joined them, and each contributed £500. The additional cost exceeded £6000. The canal was opened throughout in 1777, but the only record of wide-beamed boats using it at Retford is prior to 1799. As built, the canal was almost 46 miles (74 km) long, being 25 miles (40 km) from the Trent to Worksop with a rise of 95 feet (29 m). From Worksop to the entrance to Norwood Tunnel it was 6.1 miles (9.8 km) with a further 145 feet (44 m) rise. From there to Chesterfield it was a further 13.9 miles (22.4 km) with a fall of 73 feet (22 m) followed by a rise of 40 feet (12 m). There were 65 locks in all, with two tunnels: a short 154 yards (141 m) tunnel near Gringley Beacon, and the major 2,880 yard long Norwood Tunnel. At the time of construction, Norwood Tunnel was the joint longest canal tunnel in Britain, and it was sixth longest by the time it collapsed. The canal was a typical Brindley contour canal, following the contours to avoid costly cuttings and embankments, which resulted in a less than direct route in places.

The canal was initially fairly successful, with dividends being returned to the investors. However, the building of the Manchester, Sheffield and Lincolnshire Railway line parallel to the canal (1849) left much of the navigation redundant, and the Worksop to Chesterfield stretch ceased to serve commercial traffic in 1908, when problems with mining subsidence necessitated the closure of Norwood Tunnel. The stretch between the tunnel and Worksop subsequently fell into ruin and became un-navigable, while parts of the isolated section from the tunnel to Chesterfield were infilled and redeveloped.

== Later years ==
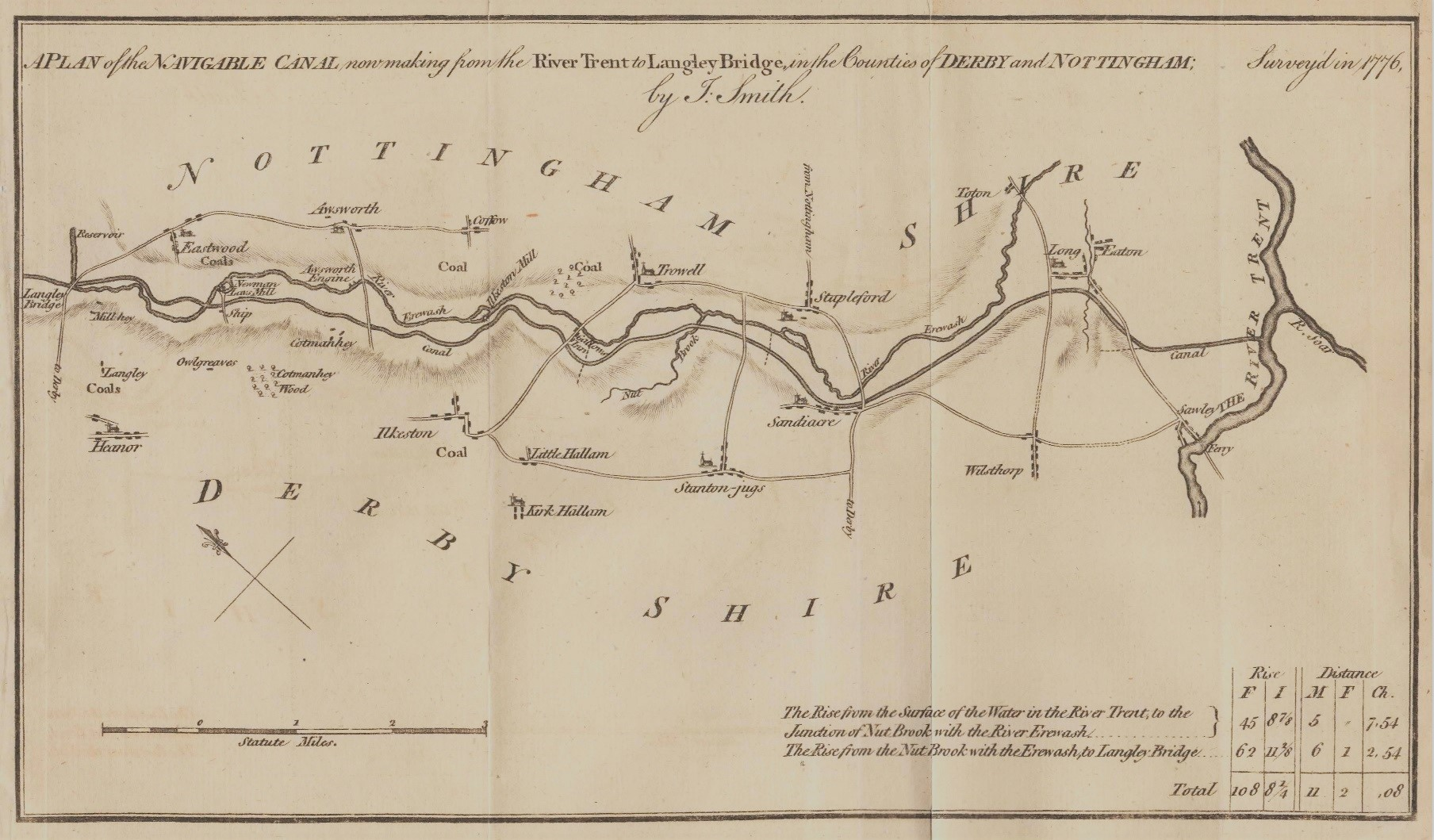
The Erewash Canal as surveyed by J. Smith in 1776

Varley was also instructed by the Chesterfield Canal Company to build a house near to the east end of the Norwood Tunnel which later was known as Pennyholme. The house was the home of John Varley and his descendants for a number of years.

Other canal projects included the Erewash Canal where Varley was appointed engineer, and Varley also produced the surveys for the Nutbrook Canal and the Leicestershire Line.

John Varley died at Pennyholme on 16 February 1809 and was buried in Harthill Parish Churchyard.

== Chesterfield Canal Trust ==
John Varley is one of the forgotten heroes of the early Industrial Revolution. The Chesterfield Canal Trust have named one of the boats which runs trips on the canal the John Varley. A plaque dedicated to Varley in commemoration of the two hundredth anniversary of his death was unveiled in the presence of the Mayor and Mayoress of Rotherham on 28 February 2009. The plaque is on the wall of The Old School House at Harthill near Rotherham.

== See also ==
- Chesterfield Canal
- Chesterfield Canal Trust
