= Norwood Tunnel =

Canal tunnel in Derbyshire, England

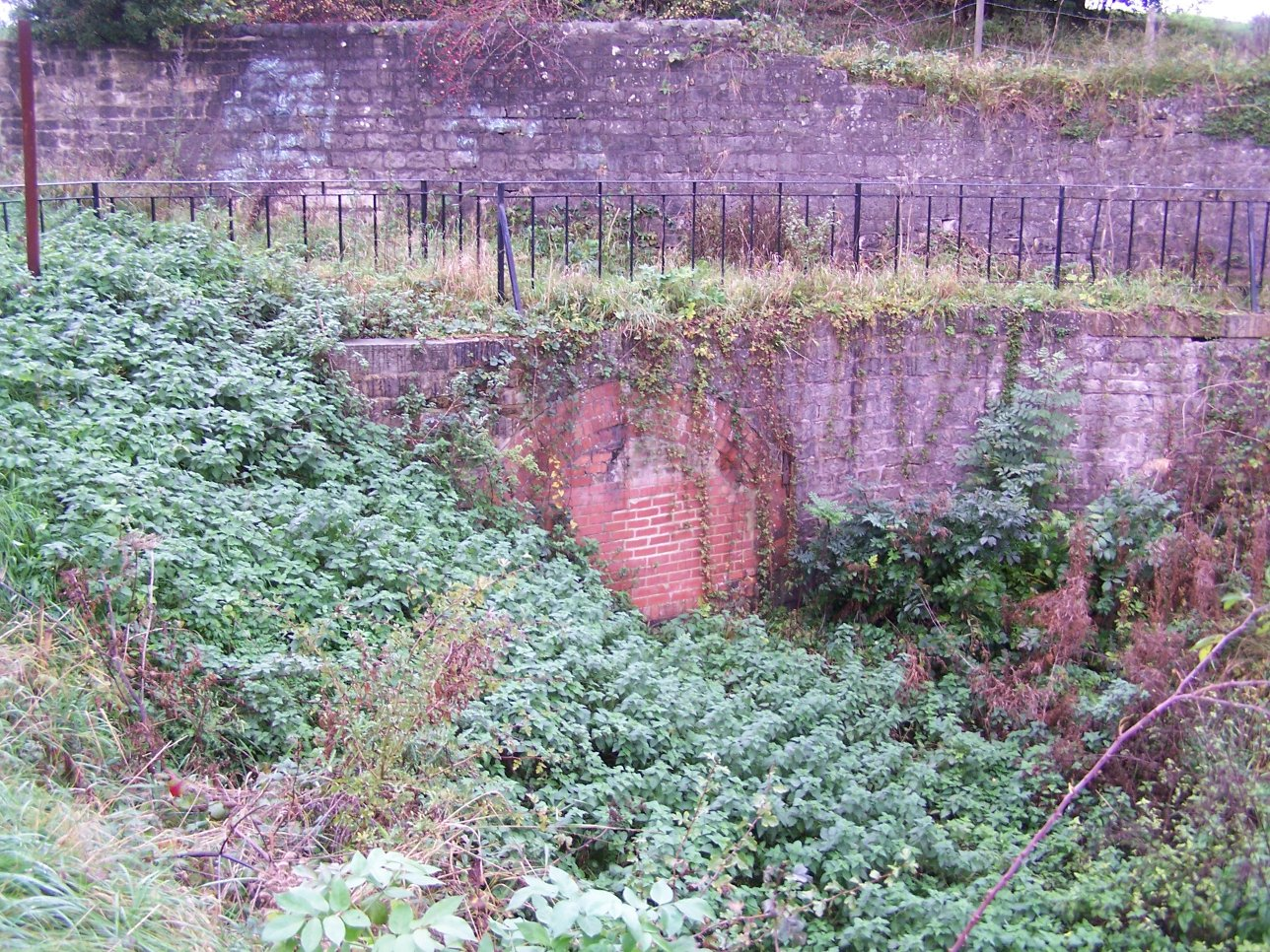
- The Eastern Portal of Norwood Tunnel
- Interactive map of Norwood Tunnel

Overview
- Location: Derbyshire / South Yorkshire
- Coordinates: 53.33501°N 1.26971°W
- OS grid reference: SK486822
- Status: collapsed Condition; Rebuilding Proposed
- Waterway: Chesterfield Canal
- Start: 53.33748°N 1.25021°W
- End: 53.33253°N 1.28921°W

Operation
- Constructed: 1771-1775
- Opened: 9 May 1775
- Closed: 1907 Collapsed
- Owner: Chesterfield Canal Company

Technical
- Design engineer: James Brindley
- Length: 2,884 yards (2,637 m)
- Tunnel clearance: 12 ft (3.7 m)
- Width: 9 feet 3 inches (2.8 m)
- Towpath: No
- Boat-passable: No

Norwood Tunnel was a 2,884-yard-long (1.639 mi; 2,637 m), 9-foot-3-inch-wide (2.82 m) and 12-foot-high (3.7 m) brick (3 million of them) lined canal tunnel on the line of the Chesterfield Canal with its Western Portal in Norwood, Derbyshire and its Eastern Portal in Kiveton, South Yorkshire, England.

== Origins ==
The Chesterfield Canal's act of Parliament, the Chesterfield to Stockwith (Trent) Canal Act 1771 (11 Geo. 3. c. 75), was passed on 28 March 1771. James Brindley was appointed as the chief engineer, and having raised the capital in just four months, the proprietors instructed him to start work on 11 July 1771. John Varley was the Clerk of the Works, and undertook the day-to-day management of the project. With plenty of optimism, they decided that work should start at Norwood Hill on the construction of the Norwood Tunnel. The work was difficult, and there were numerous accidents, with some men losing their lives, although the company appears to have been benevolent towards the families of those bereaved by the work.

Brindley told the committee on 26 June 1772 that he expected the tunnel to be completed in two years, and the whole canal in four. He did not live to see either event, as he died on 24 September. John Varley was left to continue alone as acting chief engineer after the death of Brindley. In 1774, Hugh Henshall, Brindley's brother-in-law was made chief engineer, with John Varley keeping the position of resident engineer. Apart from a short section in the middle, the tunnel was lined with bricks, and so the company established a brickworks at Harthill, and advertised for brickmakers. Three million bricks would be required, and the company would supply the materials and the coal needed to fire them. This should have been easy to do, as the area around Norwood Hill had plentiful coal deposits, but a clause in the act of Parliament stated that all minerals found during the construction of the canal remained the property of the person from whom the land had been bought, and so the canal company had to negotiate with the Duke of Leeds to buy supplies of coal, in some cases from their own land.

An intriguing aspect of the project occurred in May 1774, when the minute book records that five shillings (£0.25 (equivalent to £33 in 2025)) was paid to a Mr Samuel Watt on 22 May, for making a model of a machine to draw boats through the tunnel and demonstrating it to the committee. It is not known whether Watt was related to James Watt, who had developed an improved steam engine in the 1760s, and it was clearly too early for the machine to have been a self-propelled tug. There have been suggestions that it involved a moving chain or rope, powered by a steam engine, but nothing further was heard of the idea, as no action was taken. The Norwood Tunnel was formally opened on 9 May 1775, with the Derby Mercury newspaper carrying a report of the celebrations. Some 300 people, including Henshall and some of the principal workmen, were transported through the tunnel on three boats. They were accompanied by a musical band, and the journey took one hour and one minute. The length of the tunnel was stated as being 2,550 yards (1.45 mi; 2,330 m), with a maximum depth below ground level of 36 yards (33 m), and it was completely straight, as someone looking in at one end could see the daylight at the other. At the time it held the record for Britain's longest canal tunnel jointly with James Brindley's Harecastle Tunnel.

At the end of July 1775 an auction of equipment, which had been used to construct the tunnel, was held at the eastern portal:

1 Horse Gin complete, Wheel 14 feet diam, pulleys 3 feet 6 inches - 1 Horse Gin complete, Wheel 11 feet diam, pulleys 3 feet 6 inches - 1 Horse Gin complete, Wheel 10 feet diam, pulleys 2 feet 8 inches - 1 Water Engine Wheel, 20 feet diameter - 1 Water Engine Wheel, 17 feet diameter - 1 Water Engine Wheel, 16 feet diameter - 9 Turn Barrels and Stand Trees - 20 Yards of Pump Trees, 8 inch bore - 4, 6 inch Cast Metal Working Pieces - 1 Wind Engine - 2 Pair of Smiths Bellows - 4 Horse Water Tubs - A number of Rollers fixed in Frames for Slide Rods, Drum Wheels and Chains, and Slide and Pump Rod Joints.

The Norwood Tunnel formed a large part of the summit pound of the canal, with Norwood Locks descending from the Western Portal and Thorpe Locks descending some 2.2 miles (3.5 km) to the east of the Eastern Portal.

The tunnel did not have a towpath, and narrowboats were therefore pushed through the tunnel by their crews. This process of the crew pushing against the walls or roof of a canal tunnel with their legs in order to propel the narrowboat through the tunnel is called Legging.

== Length ==
There is some discrepancy as to the actual length of the tunnel. Sources dating from the construction, including the report in the Derby Mercury, quoted the length as 2,550 yards (1.449 mi; 2,332 m). Both Hadfield and Roffey use this length, with Roffey claiming that it was the second longest tunnel when built. Brindley's other great tunnel, that at Harecastle on the Trent and Mersey Canal, opened in April 1775, although its length is also the subject of debate, being quoted as 2,880 yards (1.636 mi; 2,633 m) by Rees and 2,897 yards (1.646 mi; 2,649 m) by de Salis, in Bradshaw. Hadfield acknowledges that it may have been extended when Thomas Telford's second Harecastle Tunnel was constructed.

The Manchester, Sheffield and Lincolnshire Railway (MSLR) purchased the Chesterfield Canal in 1847. It has been claimed that the tunnel may have been lengthened or shortened when the Sheffield to Gainsborough railway was built nearby, but a map of its predecessor, the proposed Manchester & Lincoln Union Railway of 1845, shows the portals in their current locations. Hadfield states that Bradshaw quoted the length as 3,102 yards (1.763 mi; 2,836 m), and that many modern sources follow this example. Examples include Cumberlidge, although Nicholson quotes 2,893 yards (1.644 mi; 2,645 m). Richardson quotes 2,880 yards (1.636 mi; 2,633 m), the same as Rees's length for the Harecastle Tunnel.

Skempton, in his entry for John Varley, quotes the length as 2,884 yards (1.639 mi; 2,637 m), acknowledging that there is wide divergence across many publications. He confirms that there is no evidence for the tunnel being lengthened or shortened, explaining that the quoted length has been derived by using the Ordnance Survey grid references for the tunnel portals, and using the Pythagorean theorem to calculate the length.

== Decline ==
A large colliery was developed above the tunnel, operated by the Kiveton Park Colliery Company. The removal of coal from seams under the tunnel caused major subsidence problems - segments began to sink. As the water level was constant the roof became nearer to the water surface. In 1871 the MSLR started what would be twenty years of roof-raising to keep Norwood Tunnel passable. The total cost was £17,043 (equivalent to £1,872,209 in 2025), said at the time to be £7 per linear yard. The raising of practically the whole length of the tunnel roof was done by prolonging the side walls and rebuilding the semi-circular arch. It is this work that obfuscates the originality or otherwise of the construction shafts.

After days of heavy rain a 12–14-yard (11–13 m) section of the tunnel collapsed on 18 October 1907, leaving a large hole in a field near the road to Harthill. With only minimal boat-traffic on the declining canal the cost of repairing the fall could not be justified and the tunnel has remained blocked ever since, splitting the Chesterfield Canal into two sections.

== The tunnel today ==
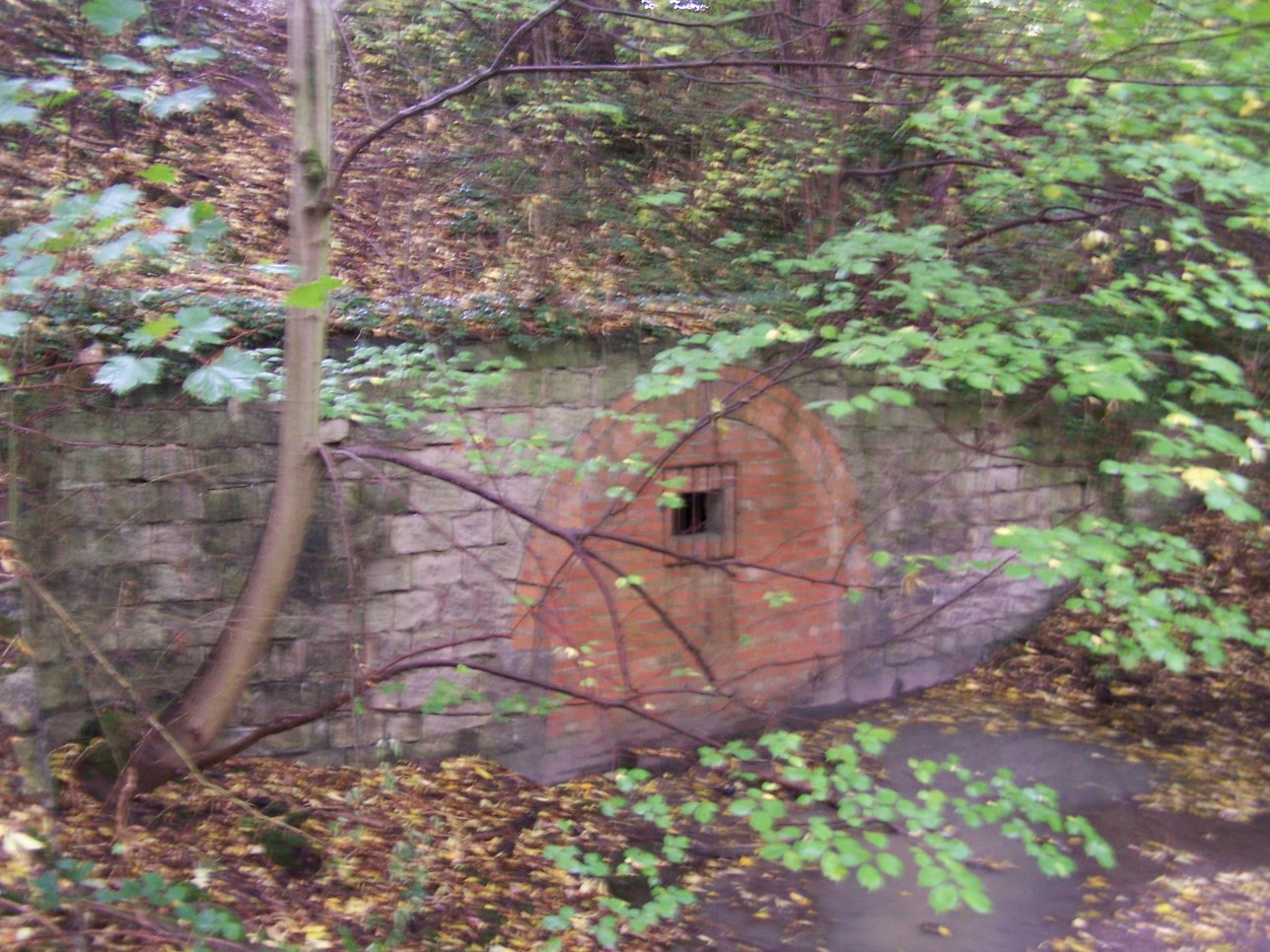
The Western Portal of Norwood Tunnel in 2006

The Chesterfield Canal has been restored as far as the Eastern Portal of the Norwood Tunnel largely through the efforts of Chesterfield Canal Trust. Part of the canal West of the tunnel from Chesterfield to Staveley has also been restored. Further restoration is proceeding. Current plans for the tunnel include the opening up of the tunnel in the Kiveton Park area, creating a cutting followed by the restoration of the remaining tunnel to Norwood.

Portal	Coordinates
Eastern	53.33748°N 1.25021°W
Midpoint	53.33501°N 1.26971°W
Western	53.33253°N 1.28921°W

== See also ==
- List of canal tunnels in Great Britain
- Chesterfield Canal

Records
Unknown	Longest tunnel 1775–1777	Succeeded by Brindley's Harecastle Tunnel
