= Chesterfield Canal Trust =

Waterway society in Derbyshire, England

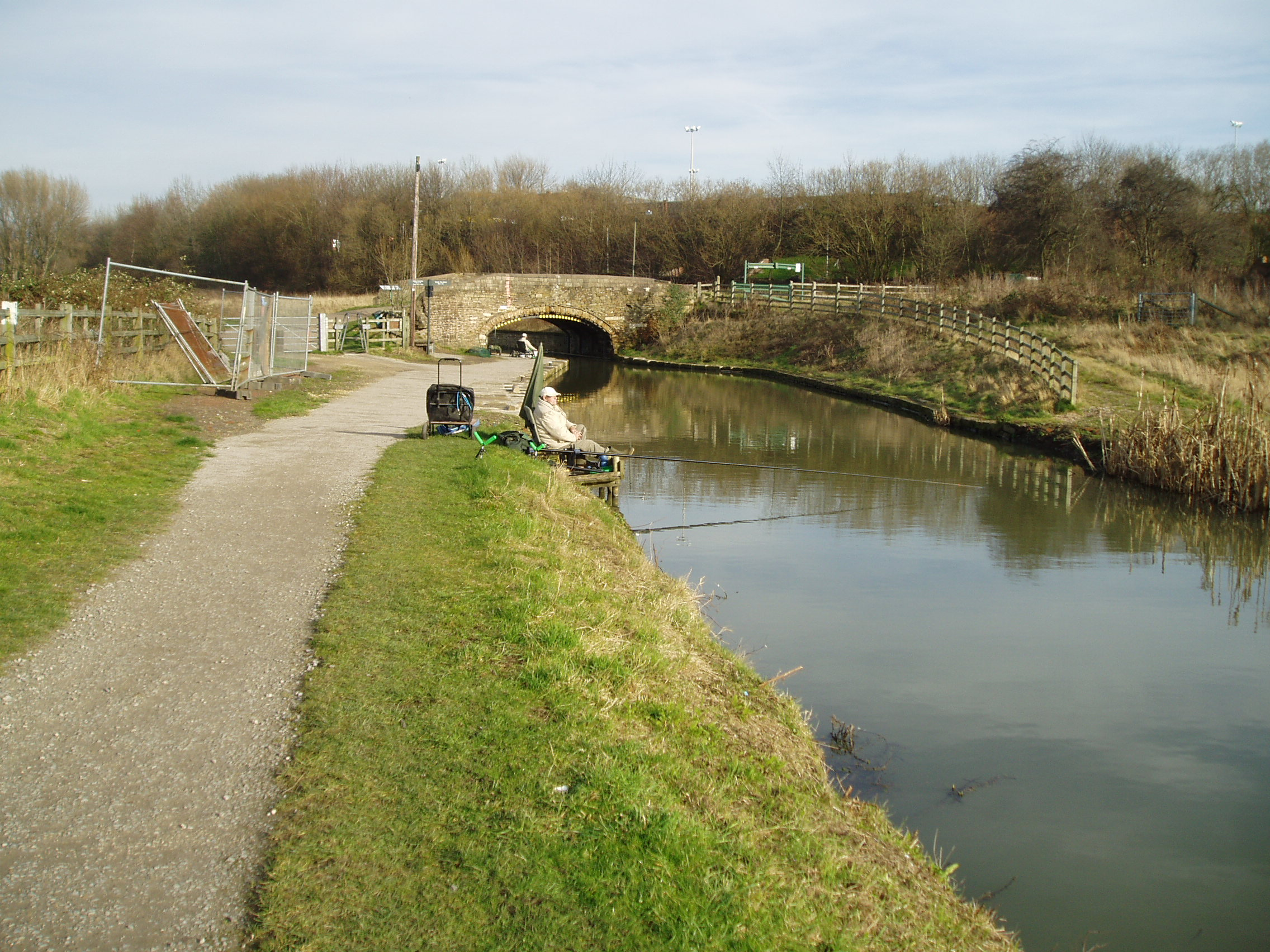
The head of navigation of the western section of the Chesterfield Canal was at Mill Green Bridge until 2011

The Chesterfield Canal Trust Limited is a waterway society and charitable company which campaigns for and undertakes various activities related to the Chesterfield Canal, which runs from Chesterfield in Derbyshire, England, to the River Trent at West Stockwith.

== History ==
The forerunner of the Trust was the Chesterfield Canal Society, founded in September 1976, at a time when the canal was derelict above Worksop. The Society worked with the Retford and Worksop Boat Club and the local branch of the Inland Waterways Association to organise a boat rally to celebrate 200 years of the canal in 1977. The event attracted around 150 boats and 21,000 people, and was the first step towards plans to restore Morse Lock, then the head of navigation.

With progress on the extension of the navigable canal above Worksop being slow, the Society turned its attention to the Chesterfield end of the canal, and completed the restoration of Tapton Lock, which was opened on 29 April 1990 by the Mayor of Chesterfield. Another major step forward occurred in 1995, when Dixon's Lock and Hollingwood Lock were opened, both having been restored by the Society. Dixon's lock was the biggest achievement, as open-cast coal mining had destroyed the original lock completely, but the replacement was surveyed, designed and built by members of the Society.

The Trust was incorporated in 1997, and a year later it took over the assets of the Society. In 2007, a new mobile information display was funded from a grant given to the Trust by the National Grid and AMEC. The money was part of a safe working initiative for workers refurbishing the overhead power lines between Chesterfield and High Marnham power station.

== Aims ==
The Trust has over 1500 members, and its aims include

- the promotion of the restoration and development of the Chesterfield Canal
- campaigning for the construction of the Rother Link which would join the Chesterfield Canal to the Sheffield and South Yorkshire Navigation. This was first proposed by the Chesterfield Canal Society in 1995, and would involve the canalisation of 8 miles (13 km) of the River Rother from Killamarsh to the River Don at Rotherham.

== Trip boats ==
The Trust operates three 12-seat trip boats, one based at Chesterfield, another at Retford and the latest one at Kiveton Park. The boats are crewed by volunteer members of the Trust and are named after influential figures in the building of the canal, namely John Varley (based at Chesterfield), Seth Ellis (after Seth Ellis Stevenson, based at Retford) and Hugh Henshall (Kiveton Park). All the boats run public trips along their respective stretches of the canal and are available for private charter. The Hugh Henshall is a 45 ft diesel electric hybrid boat, funded by a grant from Peoples Millions and the Big Lottery Fund. The Hugh Henshall and John Varley boats are both accessible by wheelchair users.

== Volunteers ==
In a similar way to the Waterway Recovery Group the trust has a volunteer workforce. This workforce meets most Sundays at various locations along the Canal to carry out repairs, or to work on specific projects.

Between 2008 and 2011 they were working on the head of navigation at Mill Green. This has now been opened up to boat traffic as a direct result of the efforts of the volunteers.

Tapton Lock Visitor Centre is located on the Chesterfield Canal to the north of Tapton Park. Chesterfield Canal Trust volunteers run regular boat trips from the visitor centre on Sundays and Bank Holiday Mondays during the summer months.

== See also ==
- List of waterway societies in the United Kingdom
