= Duckmanton =

Village in Derbyshire, England

Coordinates: 53.242°N 1.329°W

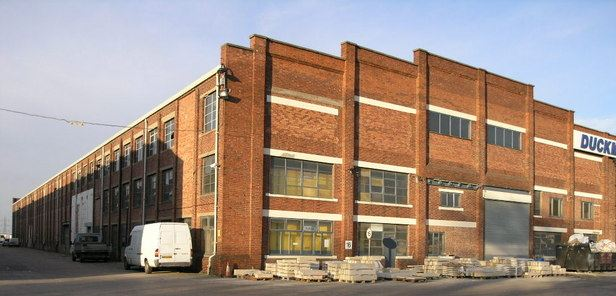
- Duckmanton Workshops.

- Location within Derbyshire
- OS grid reference: SK448718
- Civil parish: Sutton cum Duckmanton
- District: North East Derbyshire
- Shire county: Derbyshire
- Region: East Midlands
- Country: England
- Sovereign state: United Kingdom
- Post town: CHESTERFIELD
- Postcode district: S44
- Dialling code: 01246
- Police: Derbyshire
- Fire: Derbyshire
- Ambulance: East Midlands
- UK Parliament: Bolsover

Duckmanton is a village within the civil parish of Sutton cum Duckmanton, in North East Derbyshire, between Bolsover and Chesterfield. Duckmanton is a long scattered village, running north and south, usually designated Long, Middle and Far Duckmanton, of which Middle Duckmanton is 4 miles (6.4 km) east from Chesterfield and 2.5 miles (4.0 km) west from Bolsover.

In chronostratigraphy, the British sub-stage of the Carboniferous period, the 'Duckmantian' derives its name from the study of geological exposures in a railway cutting at Duckmanton.

Since 2008 and the opening of the new junction 29a on the M1 motorway, Duckmanton has grown considerably with both industry and residents. The motorway services are easily accessible to residents both by car and on foot and currently has a pub and restaurant called The Little Castle, KFC restaurant and drive thru as well as a McDonalds restaurant and drive thru and Starbucks coffee shop and drive thru. One of the latest additions has been a fish and chip restaurant and drive thru - Chesters. There is also a petrol station which has a shop and concessions inside of Greggs and Subway. The latest addition will be a Noodle Bar but nothing has been started on that as of September 2024. Across the road from the services and under construction is a large EV charging station. As well as the much needed increase in industry and jobs for the area, there are also new build houses in the pipeline. 275 houses are being built within the village on land between Tom Lane and Rectory Road. These will be a welcome addition to the housing stock in the area now that the village is becoming a desirable place to work and to live with close access to transport links yet still within a semi rural setting and close to other amenities within a few miles.

== History ==
Duckmanton is recorded in 1086 in the Domesday Book under the land of Ralph Fitzhubert.

In Duckmanton Leofnoth had four carucates of land and two bovates to the geld with land for five ploughs. There are eighteen paying tenants with five ploughs. There are eight acres of meadow and woodland pasture one league long by one league wide. TRE worth about four pounds now nineteen shillings. Geoffrey holds it.

== See also ==
- Adelphi Canal
