= Chesterfield Canal =

Canal in the East Midlands of England

Coordinates: 53°14′23.71″N 1°25′15.62″W

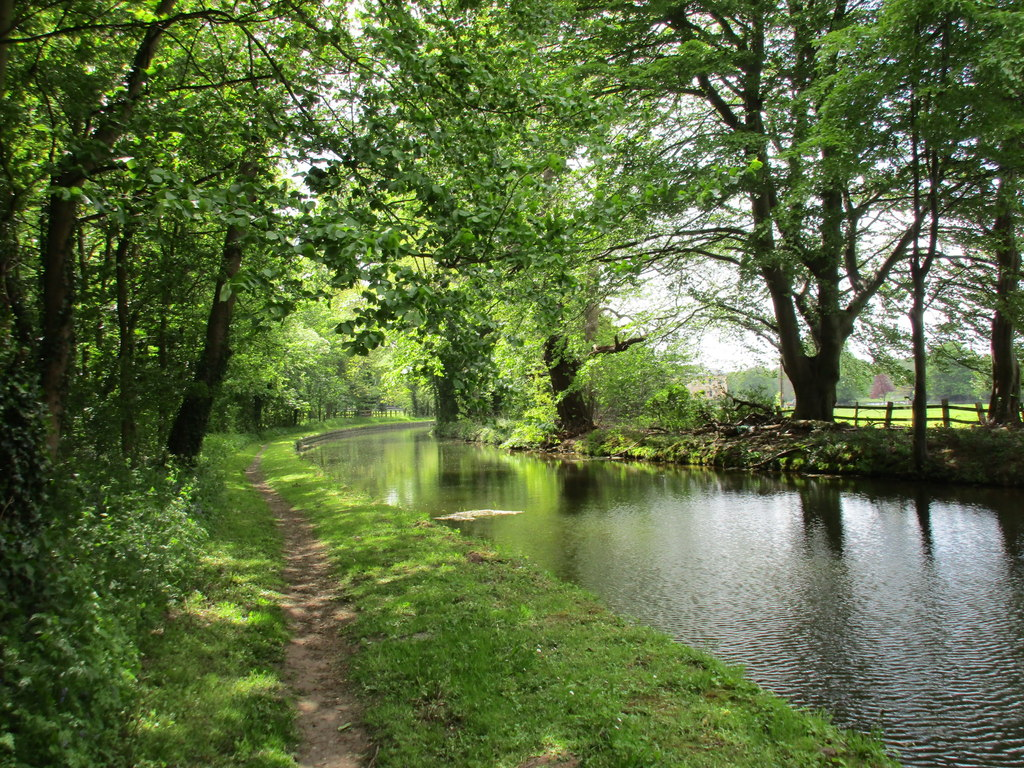
- Interactive map of Chesterfield Canal

Specifications
- Length: 45.5 miles (73.2 km)
- Maximum boat length: 72 ft 0 in (21.95 m)
- Maximum boat beam: 7 ft 0 in (2.13 m) (Locks are 14 feet (4.3 m) wide from Stockwith to Retford)
- Status: part open, part under restoration
- Navigation authority: Canal & River Trust, Derbyshire County Council

History
- Principal engineer: James Brindley
- Other engineers: John Varley; Hugh Henshall
- Date of act: 1771
- Date completed: 1777
- Date closed: 1908, 1968

Geography
- Start point: Chesterfield
- End point: West Stockwith

The Chesterfield Canal is a narrow canal in the East Midlands of England and it is known locally as 'Cuckoo Dyke'. It was one of the last of the canals designed by James Brindley, who died while it was being constructed. It was opened in 1777 and ran for 46 miles (74 km) from the River Trent at West Stockwith, Nottinghamshire to Chesterfield, Derbyshire, passing through the Norwood Tunnel at Kiveton Park, at the time one of the longest tunnels on the British canal system. The canal was built to export coal, limestone, and lead from Derbyshire, iron from Chesterfield, and corn, deals, timber, groceries and general merchandise into Derbyshire. The stone for the Palace of Westminster was quarried in North Anston, Rotherham, and transported via the canal.

It was reasonably profitable, paying dividends from 1789, and with the coming of the railways, some of the proprietors formed a railway company. It became part of the Manchester, Sheffield and Lincolnshire Railway company, and although there were intermittent plans to convert parts of it to a railway, it continued to thrive as a canal. In 1907, subsidence from local coal mines caused the collapse of the Norwood Tunnel, and the canal was effectively split in two. Subsequently, the main use of the Chesterfield end was the supply of water to the iron industry, while commercial carrying continued on the Worksop to West Stockwith section until the late 1950s.

It was formally closed in 1961, but campaigners fought for it to be retained, and the Worksop to Stockwith section was designated as a "cruiseway" under the Transport Act 1968, meaning that it would be retained for leisure use. The rest was designated as a remainder waterway, and parts were sold off, with housing being built over the route through Killamarsh. The Chesterfield Canal Society was formed in 1978 to spearhead restoration, becoming the Chesterfield Canal Trust in 1997. They initially sought to extend the navigable section beyond Worksop, but when progress was slow, moved to working on the Chesterfield end. Over 5 miles (8 km) of canal, including five original locks and a brand new lock at Staveley Basin were navigable by 2017. The eastern end was restored from Worksop to the mouth of the Norwood Tunnel at Kiveton Park near Rotherham, South Yorkshire, between 1995 and 2003, funded by Derelict Land Grants, English Partnerships and the Heritage Lottery Fund.

Less than 9 miles (14 km) of the original route remain to be restored to link the two navigable sections, but this will require some new lengths of canal to be built, to bypass the housing development at Killamarsh, and to replace most of the Norwood Tunnel, which cannot be restored. The eastern section is managed by the Canal and River Trust, while the western section is managed by Derbyshire County Council. It includes Tapton Lock Visitor Centre, located to the north of Tapton Park, and the Hollingwood Hub, which provides offices for the Trust, together with meeting rooms and a cafe. It is located by Hollingwood Lock, and consists of a large new extension on the back of the refurbished lock house.

== History ==
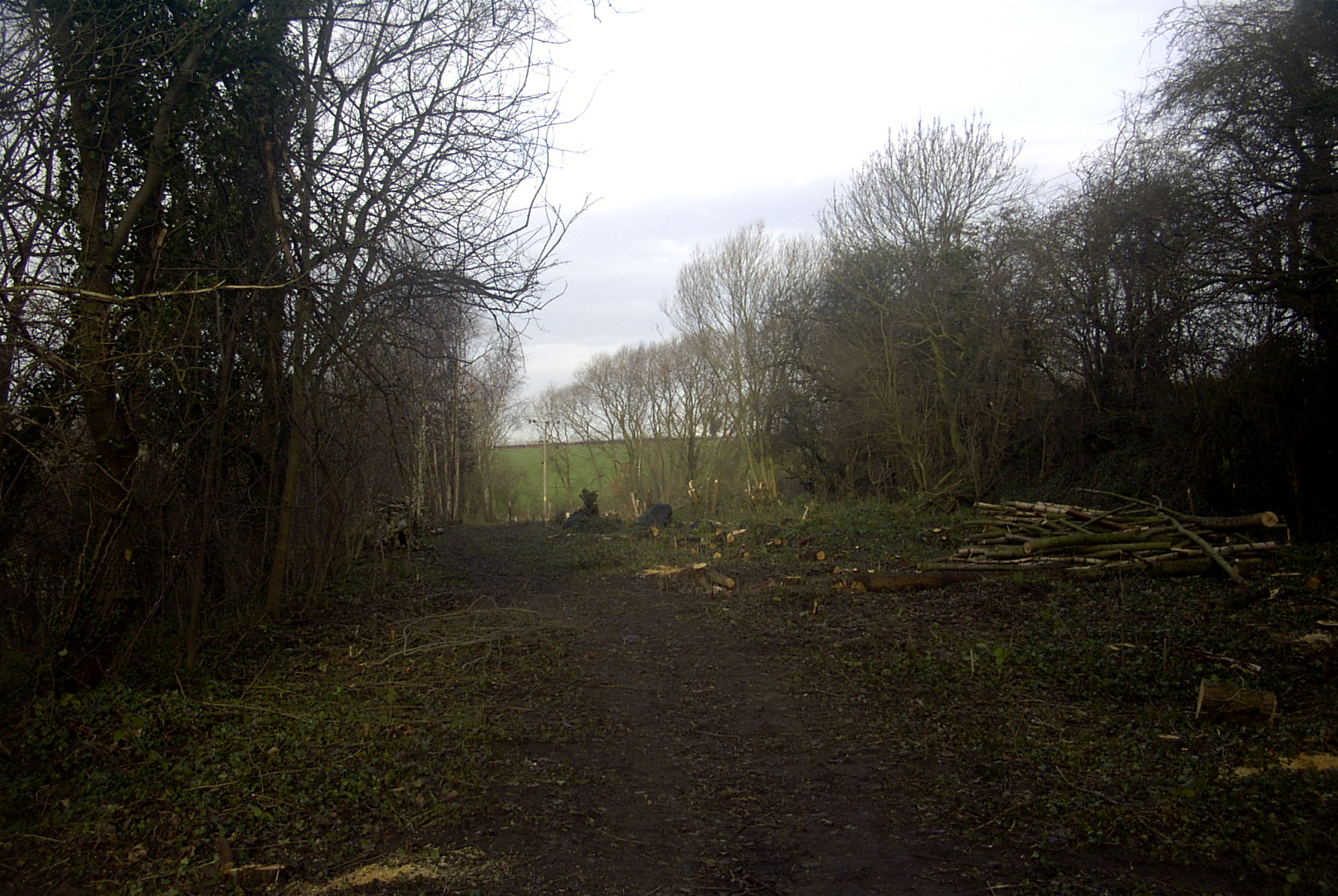
A section of the canal undergoing restoration

Lead had been mined in Derbyshire on a commercial scale since at least 1300, but the industry was hampered by poor transport links. The pigs of lead were carried by pack horses to Bawtry, where there were wharves on the River Idle. Small boats carried them to the River Trent, where the cargo was transferred to larger vessels for onward distribution. There was no proper system of road maintenance, and so the use of carts and wagons for the over-land journey was not possible. The River Idle was also unreliable, being affected by floods and droughts, but there were no alternatives, and the industry flourished despite the difficulties. The Derwent Navigation was authorised in 1719, running from Derby to the River Trent, but it was less reliable than the Idle, and so did not seriously affect trade through Bawtry. The London Lead Company, one of the main traders, together with others involved in lead and coal mining, looked for possible solutions, and were joined in this by several prominent landowners.

The main impetus for a canal came from the owners of mineral rights. The London Lead Company met with the Duke of Devonshire, the Duke of Newcastle, and others, but proposals were actively supported by the towns of Chesterfield, Worksop and Retford. Retford had obtained an act of Parliament, the Idle Navigation Act 1719 (6 Geo. 1. c. 30), to improve the River Idle from Bawtry to the town, but very little work was done to implement the scheme. In addition to being a market town, Retford also manufactured bricks and tiles, had reserves of gravel, and produced an agricultural surplus. In 1769, a steering group produced a pamphlet extolling the advantages of a proposed canal, which was available to everyone, but was primarily addressed to the Duke of Newcastle, Lord George Augustus Cavendish, and the Member of Parliament (MP) for Derbyshire, Godfrey Bagnall Clarke.

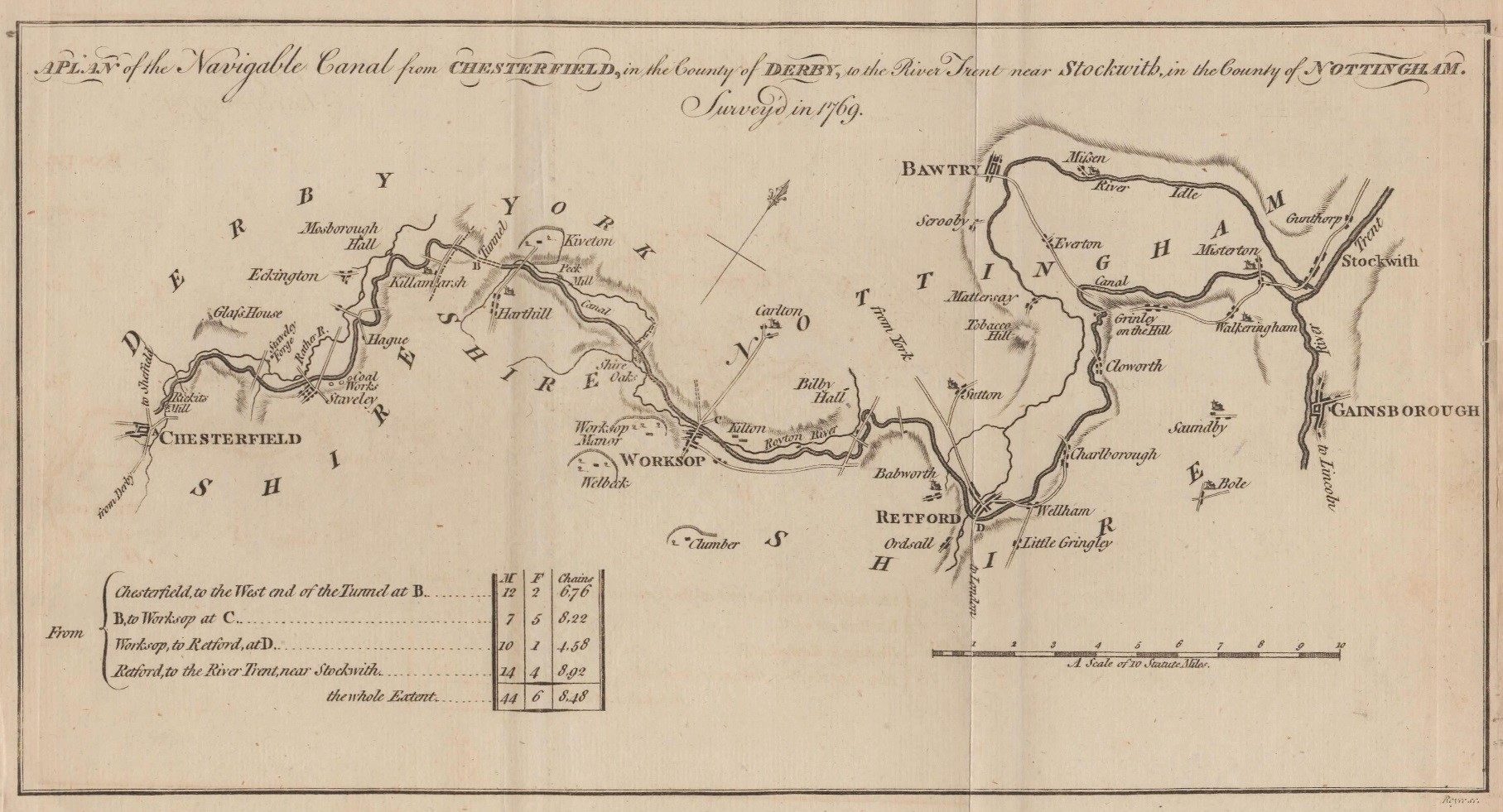
The Chesterfield Canal surveyed in 1769. Published in the Gentleman's Magazine in 1777.

The route of the canal was surveyed by James Brindley and John Varley, who estimated the cost at £94,908 17s. Brindley presented his proposals to a meeting in Worksop on 24 August 1769. Bawtry interests asked John Grundy to carry out a second survey. He proposed a rather shorter course, from Stockwith in a straight line to Bawtry and then by Scrooby, Blyth and Carlton, to join Brindley's line at Shireoaks. Grundy's line was 5 1/2 miles (8.9 km) shorter, and the cost estimated at £71,479 6s 9 1/2d. Although Grundy's line was considerably cheaper, it achieved this by missing Worksop and Retford, and the investors had already decided in favour of Brindley's route.

Chesterfield to Stockwith (Trent) Canal Act 1771
- Act of Parliament
- Parliament of Great Britain
- Long title: An Act for making a navigable Cut or Canal from Chesterfield, in the County of Derby, through or near Worksop and Retford, to join the River Trent at or near Stockwith, in the County of Nottingham.
- Citation: 11 Geo. 3. c. 75
- Territorial extent: Great Britain

Dates
- Royal assent: 28 March 1771
- Commencement: 13 November 1770 (Note: Start of session.)
Other legislation
Amended by	Manchester and Lincoln Union Railway and Chesterfield and Gainsborough Canal Act 1846

Status: Amended

Text of statute as originally enacted

An application was made to Parliament and the act of Parliament, the Chesterfield to Stockwith (Trent) Canal Act 1771 (11 Geo. 3. c. 75) was given royal assent on 28 March 1771, entitled An Act for making a navigable Cut or Canal from Chesterfield, in the county of Derby, through or near Worksop and Retford, to join the River Trent, at or near Stockwith, in the county of Nottingham.

The promoters consisted of one hundred and seventy-four persons, amongst whom were the Duke of Devonshire, the Duke of Newcastle, Lord Scarsdale, the Dean of York, and Sir Cecil Wray. They were incorporated by the name of The Company of Proprietors of the Canal Navigation from Chesterfield to the River Trent, and empowered to raise among themselves the sum of £100,000, in one thousand shares of £100 each, to fund the construction.

Immediately on the passing of the act, construction began under the direction of Brindley. Upon his death in September 1772, John Varley moved from Clerk of Works to Resident Engineer with Hugh Henshall, Brindley's brother-in-law, appointed in a consultative capacity. He agreed to make inspections every three months. Henshall became Chief Engineer in 1773 and John Varley continued to work on the project. By August 1773, the section between Shireoaks and Worksop was nearly complete, and the company created a works to build boats at Shireoaks. The boats were used to carry spoil from the construction, and also to deliver coal. The canal was effectively open from Shireoaks to below Worksop by 6 April 1774, and to Retford by 3 August. The price of coal to the residents of Retford dropped from 15s 6d (77.5p) to 10s 6d (52.5p) overnight. Hayton was reached on 22 February 1775, and the Norwood Tunnel opened on 9 May 1775. The canal was to be built as a narrow canal, but in 1775, nine shareholders offered to fund the extra cost of making it a broad canal from Retford to Stockwith. Retford Corporation joined them, and each contributed £500, although the additional cost exceeded the £6,000 subscribed. The canal was opened throughout on 4 June 1777, with the lock into the River Trent at West Stockwith completed in the autumn, but the only record of wide-beamed boats using it at Retford is prior to 1799.

=== Operation ===
As built, the canal was almost 46 miles (74 km) long, being 25 miles (40 km) from the Trent to Worksop with a rise of 95 feet (29 m). From Worksop to the eastern portal of Norwood Tunnel it was 6.1 miles (9.8 km) with a further 145 feet (44 m) rise. From there to Chesterfield it was a further 13.9 miles (22.4 km) with a fall of 73 feet (22 m) followed by a rise of 40 feet (12 m). There were 65 locks in all, with two tunnels: a short 154-yard (141 m) tunnel near Gringley Beacon, and the major 2,884-yard (2,637 m) long Norwood Tunnel. (Note: The length of the tunnel was quoted as 2,850 yards (2,610 m) when the tunnel opened, and although modern sources often quote the length as 3,102 yards (2,836 m), there is no evidence that it was subsequently altered. There is wide divergence across publications, but using grid references for the tunnel portals, the Institution of Civil Engineers calculated the length as 2,884 yards (2,637 m)) At the time of construction, Norwood Tunnel was the second longest canal tunnel in Britain, exceeded only by another of Brindley's tunnels, that at Harecastle on the Trent and Mersey Canal. The canal was a typical Brindley contour canal, following the contours to avoid costly cuttings and embankments, which resulted in a less than direct route in places.

In late 1775, the company had decided to build a branch, which left the canal between Renishaw and Staveley, and ran generally southwards for about 1 mile (1.6 km) to the turnpike road at Norbriggs. This may have been to help with transport to Chesterfield, until the main line was completed, but in 1777, the company leased Norbriggs Colliery. Henshall supervised its operation, and transport of coal to the branch canal was improved by the provision of a "Newcastle Rail Road" in 1778, which used wooden rails. The company pulled out of running the mine in 1797, when they advertised it to be let. Water supply was initially by a reservoir at Pebley, which was later supplemented by reservoirs at Harthill, Woodall and Killamarsh. Near Worksop, a private branch was built to serve the Lady Lee quarry, which ran for about 0.75 miles (1.21 km), while at Netherthorpe, a branch connected to the East Inkersall tramroad, which served pits near the Adelphi Canal. A gasworks was later built at the junction, and while the 1877 Ordnance Survey map shows a short stub of the branch, connecting to the Seymour and Speedwell Branch railway, by 1898 a railway siding had replaced it, leaving just a basin at the junction to serve the gasworks. Another private branch was built in 1840, which crossed the Norbriggs road at Netherthorpe to serve the Speedwell Colliery. It was built by the Barrows, who also owned Staveley ironworks, but by 1860 had been replaced by a railway.

By 1789, the company had spent a total of £152,400, raised through shares and by mortgages. Income for the year was £8,320, and after interest payments had been met, that left a net profit of £2,780, enabling them to make their first dividend payment of one per cent. 74,312 tons of traffic were carried that year, of which 42,380 tons were coal, with the rest consisting of lead, iron, stone, corn, lime, timber and sundries. Dividends had risen to five per cent by 1795, were eight per cent the following year, and were six or seven per cent until at least 1836. There were several suggestions for links to the River Don Navigation or the Sheffield Canal, the first in 1792 as part of the scheme to build a canal to Sheffield, and subsequently in 1824, as part of the Grand Commercial Canal. In 1852 a Sheffield and Chesterfield Junction Canal was proposed, but none of these schemes moved past the planning stage.

=== Railway age ===
Manchester and Lincoln Union Railway and Chesterfield and Gainsborough Canal Act 1846 (Note: Section 2.)
- Act of Parliament
- Parliament of the United Kingdom
- Long title: An Act for making a Railway from the Midland Railway at Staveley to the Town of Worksop, and for consolidating into One Undertaking the said proposed Railway and the Canal Navigation from Chesterfield to the River of Trent.
- Citation: 9 & 10 Vict. c. ccclviii
- Territorial extent: United Kingdom

Dates
- Royal assent: 7 August 1846
- Commencement: 7 August 1846 (Note: The Acts of Parliament (Commencement) Act 1793.)
- Repealed: 1 August 1849
Other legislation
Amends	Chesterfield to Stockwith (Trent) Canal Act 1771
Repealed by	Manchester, Sheffield and Lincolnshire Railway Act 1849

Status: Repealed

Text of statute as originally enacted

Manchester and Lincoln Union Railway (Deviation) Act 1847
- Act of Parliament
- Parliament of the United Kingdom
- Long title: An Act to authorize a Deviation in the Line of the Manchester and Lincoln Union Railway.
- Citation: 10 & 11 Vict. c. cii
- Territorial extent: United Kingdom

Dates
- Royal assent: 2 July 1847
- Commencement: 2 July 1847
- Repealed: 1 August 1849
Other legislation
Repealed by	Manchester, Sheffield and Lincolnshire Railway Act 1849

Status: Repealed

Text of statute as originally enacted

Manchester, Sheffield and Lincolnshire Railways, and Manchester and Lincoln Union Railway and Chesterfield and Gainsborough Canal Amalgamation Act 1847
- Act of Parliament
- Parliament of the United Kingdom
- Long title: An Act to incorporate the Manchester and Lincoln Railway and Chesterfield and Gainsborough Canal Company with the Manchester, Sheffield, and Lincolnshire Railway Company.
- Citation: 10 & 11 Vict. c. cxc
- Territorial extent: United Kingdom

Dates
- Royal assent: 9 July 1847
- Commencement: 9 July 1847
- Repealed: 1 August 1849
Other legislation
Repealed by	Manchester, Sheffield and Lincolnshire Railway Act 1849

Status: Repealed

Text of statute as originally enacted

In the 1840s, Railway Mania was gripping the country, with many speculative schemes being proposed. Rather than face steady demise as the new form of transport developed, a number of the proprietors formed the Manchester and Lincoln Union Railway Company in October 1845. The intention was to build a line from Liverpool to Grimsby, and to convert part of the canal into a railway. Locally, this included a line from Staveley to Gainsborough, via Worksop, with a branch to Lincoln and another from Worksop to Beighton. The previous year, the Sheffield and Lincolnshire Junction Railway had been proposed, to build a line from Sheffield to Gainsborough, and was supported by the Sheffield, Ashton-under-Lyne and Manchester Railway. The new scheme was in direct competition to the earlier one, but the two sets of proprietors met and agreed to amalgamate. Now arguing from a position of strength, the Manchester and Lincoln Union Railway rescinded their plans for most of their lines, and obtained the Manchester and Lincoln Union Railway and Chesterfield and Gainsborough Canal Act 1846 (9 & 10 Vict. c. ccclviii) on 7 August 1846 allowing them to construct a line from the Midland Railway at Staveley to the canal at Worksop. The new company amalgamated with the Chesterfield Canal, to become the rather unwieldy Manchester and Lincoln Union Railway and Chesterfield and Gainsborough Canal, with powers to further amalgamate with the Sheffield and Lincolnshire Junction Railway. However, by the time they announced this, the Sheffield and Lincolnshire Junction Railway had already become part of the Manchester, Sheffield and Lincolnshire Railway, and so they amalgamated with that company instead by the Manchester, Sheffield and Lincolnshire Railways, and Manchester and Lincoln Union Railway and Chesterfield and Gainsborough Canal Amalgamation Act 1847 (10 & 11 Vict. c. cxc). The 1846 act of Parliament stated that although the canal company was to be dissolved, the entire canal was to be retained, its water supplies maintained, and tolls were to be fixed at a just level.

Under the new regime, the canal was put back into good order in 1848, after many years where regular maintenance had been neglected. The benefits were immediate, with traffic increasing as a result. Over 200,000 tons were carried in 1848, the highest recorded total. The railway company started to operate as a carrier on the canal, and to maintain water levels, the reservoirs at Harthill were enlarged in 1856. Traffic levels were holding up in 1858, despite fierce competition from the London and North Western Railway. However, the owners considered options for converting the canal from Kiverton Park to Chesterfield into a railway in 1872, 1873 and 1884, but on each occasion, the plans were shelved. The Manchester, Sheffield and Lincolnshire Railway was expanding, and an act of Parliament, the Manchester, Sheffield and Lincolnshire Railway Act 1889 (52 & 53 Vict. c. ciii) was obtained which allowed them to divert parts of the canal to enable a new railway connecting Chesterfield, Staveley and Beighton to be constructed. The new route was straighter than the old, and reduced the length of the canal by around 1/2 mile (0.8 km). The Beighton to Staveley section of the new railway opened on 1 December 1891, and reached Chesterfield on 4 June 1892. The railway's carrying business on this and other canals ceased shortly afterwards. The original route of the canal at Hague Lane was largely destroyed by the construction of the railway and Renishaw Central station, but further north, the section around Chapel Wheel Forge and Dam is still clearly visible, and reinstatement of it as part of a restored canal was considered but rejected on practical grounds. Close to Bluebank Lock, the railway, known as the Great Central Railway Chesterfield Loop, turned to the east and passed to the south of Staveley Iron Works to reach Staveley Town station. Prior to construction of this section, the canal looped to the north around the iron works, passing through Cinderhill Lock before turning south-eastwards. The canal was re-routed along the southern edge of the works, and the railway crossed over at Staveley Works station, almost on top of a new lock which was known as Staveley Works Lock or Hollingwood Lock.

Parts of the canal above Worksop were affected by subsidence from local coal mines. By 1905, traffic had dropped to 45,177 tons, of which around 15,000 tons were coal and 11,000 were bricks. Some 40 boats were still working on the canal, although a short section between Staveley and Chesterfield had become unnavigable. The canal was making a loss, with receipts of £1,837 and expenditure of £3,883 in 1905. The largest drain on resources was the Norwood Tunnel, where £21,000 had been spent since 1871, in an attempt to repair damage and raise the roof. However, on 18 October 1907 there was a further substantial collapse, and the tunnel was closed. Effectively, the canal above Worksop became redundant. Responsibility for the canal passed to the London and North Eastern Railway (LNER) in 1923, who carried out regular maintenance, and repaired and enlarged the lock connecting West Stockwith basin to the River Trent between 1923 and 1925. Various attempts to reduce the growth of weed, which had first appeared on the canal in 1852, were made, with variable success, and there was a brisk trade in munitions during the Second World War. The last serious commercial traffic on the canal was the carriage of bricks from Walkeringham to West Stockwith, which ended in 1955, although there was a small trade in warp, a fine silt dredged from the Trent at the mouth of the River Idle, and used by the cutlery trade in Sheffield for polishing metal, which lasted into the early 1960s. Parts of the isolated section from the tunnel to Chesterfield were infilled and redeveloped.

== Restoration ==
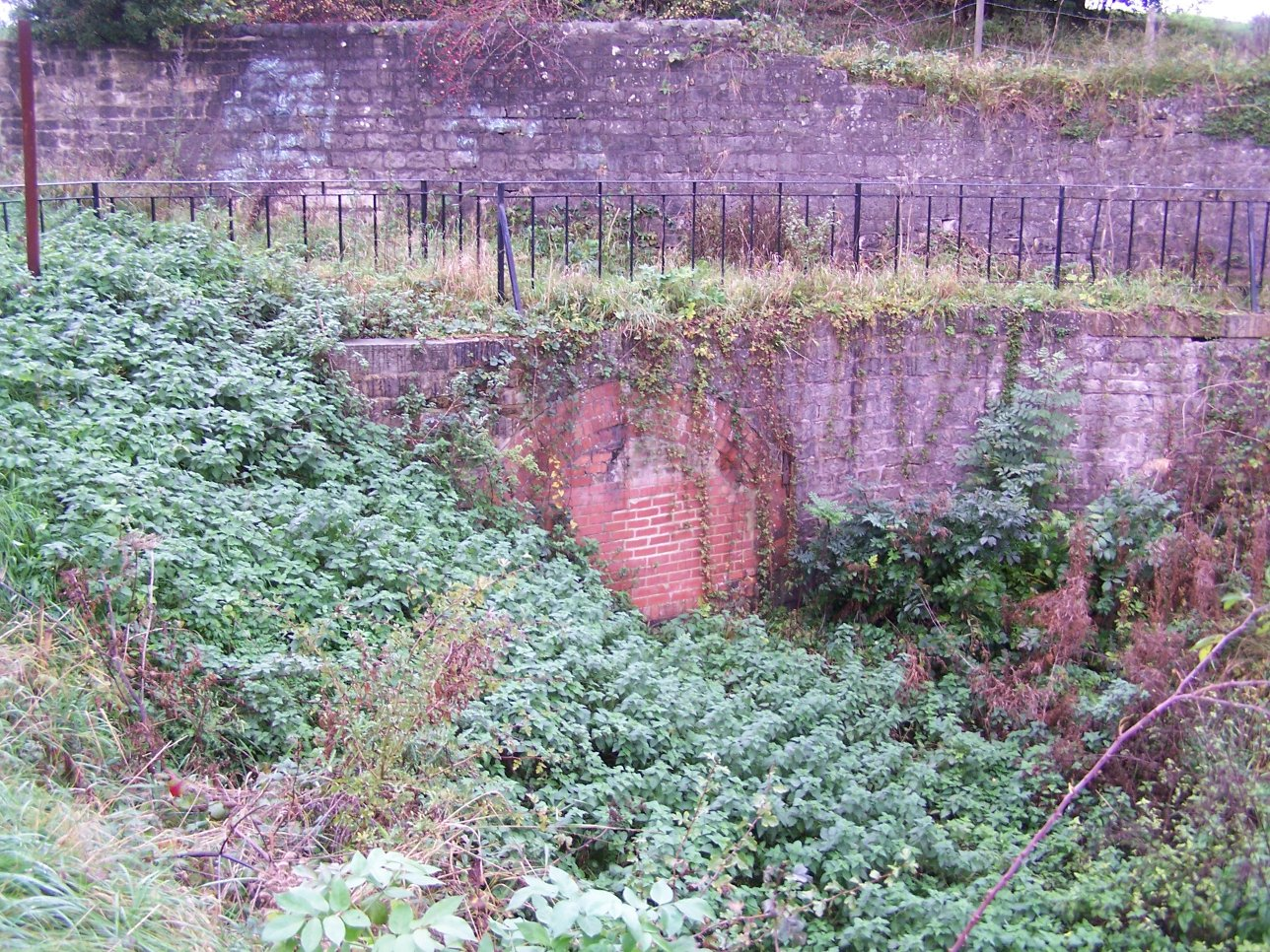
The eastern portal of the Norwood Tunnel

Following the post-war Labour Government nationalisation of the railways and the canals, the Chesterfield Canal became the responsibility of the British Transport Commission. They were determined to close any canals that were not used to carry freight, and did not see any future in leisure use. By 1961, the canal had been formally closed, all requests to use it for leisure purposes were refused, and there were proposals for official abandonment of its entire length. Much of it was filled with rubbish and stagnant water, but despite this, Cliff Clarke, a businessman from South Yorkshire, mounted a campaign to save it. The British Transport Commission agreed to keep the canal open for two more years in 1962, although the lock gates from Worksop to Kiveton were removed, and the lock walls bulldozed, on the grounds of public safety. Clarke formed the Retford and Worksop (Chesterfield Canal) Boat Club soon afterwards, and it became a limited company in 1966, to cope with the growing membership. Unofficial work parties were organised, to clear locks and cut back vegetation and weed; they were unofficial because the British Transport Commission would not allow volunteers to work on their property. Such activity became slightly more collaborative when the canal became the responsibility of the British Waterways Board. Government policy changed following the publication of a White Paper entitled British Waterways: Recreation and Amenity in September 1967, and the canal was classified as a cruiseway between the Trent and Morse Lock, Worksop under the Transport Act 1968, meaning that it would be maintained to a navigable standard for leisure use. The rest of the canal was classified as remainder.

By 1968, restoration efforts were sufficiently organised that the Chesterfield Canal was mentioned in the May edition of the Bulletin, produced for members of the Inland Waterways Association (IWA) by the forerunners of the Waterway Recovery Group. The Chesterfield Canal Society was formed in September 1976, determined to restore the canal beyond Worksop, and in 1977 they organised a boat rally at Worksop to commemorate the 200th anniversary of the canal, in conjunction with the Worksop and Retford Boat Club. Bassetlaw District Council provided financial backing, and the event was held over four days, coinciding with the Queen's Silver Jubilee. Some 150 boats and over 21,000 people attended, with catering services, theatrical performances and exhibitions held on the Bracebridge showground. The Duke of Devonshire opened the festivities, and the Chesterfield Canal Society was formally launched, with a view to attracting support from anyone interested in the canal, rather than just from boaters.

Progress beyond Worksop moved forwards rapidly in 1995, when a Derelict Land Grant was obtained by Nottinghamshire County Council, and with additional funding from British Coal, a £4.5 million scheme began to restore the canal between Worksop and the aqueduct over the River Ryton which forms the county boundary. Rotherham Borough Council were hoping to obtain similar grants for the section between the aqueduct and the Norwood Tunnel, but the funding came from the Heritage Lottery Fund and the regeneration agency English Partnerships. The complete project cost £19 million, which included an extra £971,000 received from the Heritage Lottery Fund, to allow detailed archaeological investigation of the Thorpe and Turnerwood lock flights to be undertaken. On 18 November 2002, the first boats in over 70 years ascended the Turnerwood flight. Thirty locks had been restored, from Morse Lock (49) near Worksop to Thorpe Top Treble Lock (20) near Thorpe Salvin. Three bridges had been rebuilt with navigable headroom, one over Tylden Road, the main access road into Rhodesia, an adjacent one that provided access to nearby cottages, and one which carried Shireoaks Common over the canal near to Shireoaks railway station. Just before Ryton Aqueduct, a new shallow lock named Boundary Lock (41a) had been required, due to widespread subsidence affecting the ground levels, and at Shireoaks, the former colliery loading basin had been turned into a marina.

=== Western section ===
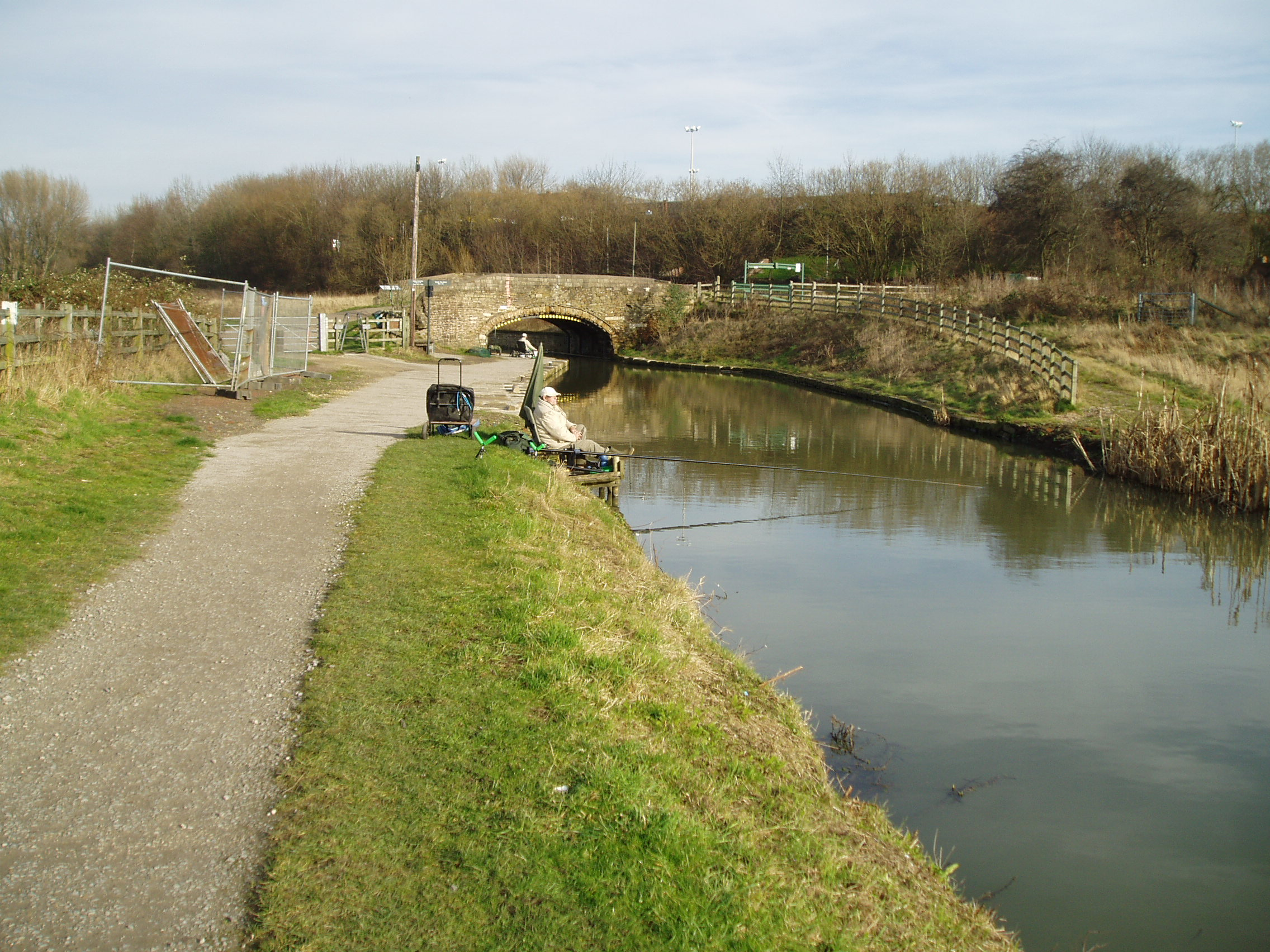
Mill Green Bridge was the head of navigation of the western section prior to the opening of Staveley Basin in early 2012.

Restoration had focused initially on the route east from Norwood Tunnel to Worksop, which presented relatively few physical obstacles to being restored to navigation. However, in practice progress had been slow, and attention turned to the section west of Norwood Tunnel, where much more damage had been done to the canal bed, with it being filled in and built over in many places. This included the construction of housing at Killamarsh in the 1970s, which went ahead despite protests. However, parts of the channel had survived remarkably well in places, as it had been used to supply water to the iron industry, and maintained by a team with a boat until the 1950s. The last few miles of the canal, from Chesterfield to Staveley, were in reasonable condition, although the towpath was overgrown and difficult to access, while much of the route was under threat from opencast coal mining and a planned bypass, which had first been proposed in 1927. Regular work parties began the process of restoration in 1988, organised by the Chesterfield Canal Society, and supplemented by volunteers from the Waterway Recovery Group periodically. Tapton lock was the first to be reopened, in 1990. Derbyshire County Council acquired the section of canal between Chesterfield and Staveley and secured derelict land grants to enable dredging and towpath maintenance to take place. A campaign to ensure that once all the coal had been extracted from the opencast mine, the canal would be reinstated was successful. Two lowered bridges had been rebuilt by June 2001, and Cow Lane Bridge followed in May 2002. Four more locks were restored, with the 5-mile (8 km) section from Chesterfield being reopened to navigation in 2002.

In a separate development, a private owner of a length of the canal near Boiley Farm, Killamarsh, obtained a Derelict Land Grant to enable him to restore around 550 yards (500 m) of the channel in 1992. Although used as fishing ponds, the work resulted in a navigable profile being re-established, and a water supply was obtained from a small unnamed brook, which feeds into the southern end of the ponds. An earth bund at the site of the former Gallas footbridge divides the channel into two ponds, and carries a public footpath. In 1997, the Chesterfield Canal Trust was formed, as a limited company with charitable aims, and took over the assets of the Canal Society in 1998.

A breach in the canal in March 2007, caused by the collapse of a culvert carrying the Tinkersick Brook under the canal, forced temporary closure of all but the top pound above Tapton Lock for about six weeks. Near the site of the former Renishaw Iron Foundry, which closed in 1992 and was subsequently redeveloped for housing, a length of canal was re-excavated in 2007–08. The work included the new Renishaw Foundry footbridge (18a), which connects the housing to green space and a play area on the bank of the canal, and deep piling where an embankment originally carried the canal over the Smithy Brook. The development of the site ceased in 2010, when there were issues with ownership of the land. Since then, there have been issues with vandalism, and the lack of a natural water supply has been a continuing problem.

Over the winter of 2010–11, the Canal Trust obtained its first permanent base, when the lock house at Hollingwood Lock was renovated and a large extension added to the rear. The building, which is known as the Hollingwood Hub, was funded by a grant from Community Assets, part of the government's Office for Civil Society, and provides offices for the Trust, a meeting room and a coffee shop. The ecology of the area was improved by the planting of 450 trees, provided by the Woodland Trust, in November 2011.

The next big advance was the opening of some 660 yards (600 m) of canal beyond Mill Green Bridge, and the construction of a new mooring basin at Staveley, which was completed in early 2012. Funding for the basin was provided by Derbyshire County Council with a grant from the East Midlands Development Agency, and the work which included the reclamation of the surrounding land, won an award from the Institute of Civil Engineers, given jointly to Derbyshire and the contractors NT Killingley. The work was aided by a road-building scheme for a new Staveley Bypass, which enabled two bridges to be raised and a third to be built, all with sufficient clearance for navigation.

=== North from Staveley ===
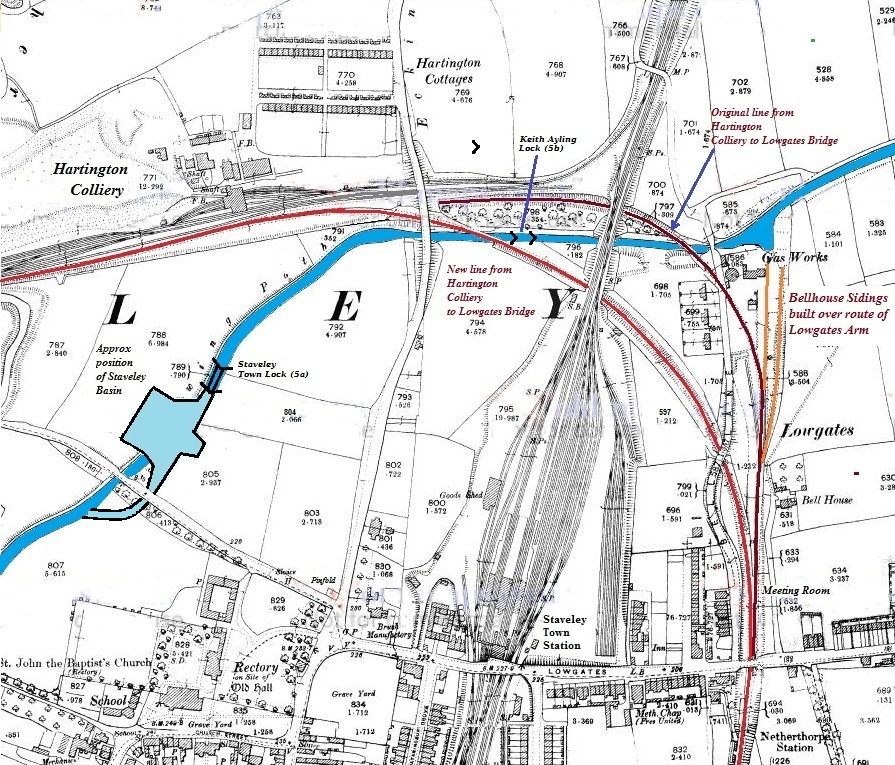
A map of the canal at Staveley in 1898, showing the locations of the Mineral Line bridge and modern basin.

Progress beyond Staveley Basin was hampered by a railway bridge. The first bridge over the canal in this location was further to the east, and was erected in the 1850s, when the canal arm to Speedwell Colliery was filled in, to be converted to a railway. The Staveley Ironworks railway system was sold to the Midland Railway in the 1870s, who built a replacement line and bridge, to ease the sharpness of the curve. This area has suffered from subsidence, so when the canal was formally abandoned, the twin-track iron bow girder bridge was removed and the canal was filled in. A combination of subsidence, and the use of a deep ballast base to enable tracks to be carried straight over any new bridge had reduced the available headroom by 7 feet 5 inches (2.25 m). The solution adopted to overcome this was the construction of a dropped pound, with a new Staveley Town Lock (5a) immediately to the north of Staveley Basin to lower the level of the canal, and Railway Lock (5b) constructed just beyond the railway bridge. A syphon will maintain the water supply to the canal beyond the dropped pound. Staveley Town Lock was completed just in time for the Inland Waterways Association National Trailboat Festival, which was held at Staveley over the bank holiday weekend in late May 2016.

The first boat passed through the lock on 26 May, and it was officially opened on 28 May. However, once the festival was over, a clay bund was reinstated above the lock, and the pound below it drained, to allow work to continue on the weir and spillway which carries excess water back to the River Rother. Although the track on the mineral line had been removed, its route had been reserved to provide access to a maintenance depot, for the High Speed 2 (HS2) railway project. On 1 October 2017, the Trust received permission from Network Rail to investigate the bridge remains, and the infill was removed over the next few days.

Railway Lock (5b) was subsequently named the Keith Ayling Lock, after the chair of the Chesterfield Canal Trust, who had been so influential in getting the canal restored during his tenure from 1991 to 2009. Construction of the new lock was underway in early 2026. Although the northern part of HS2 was cancelled in 2021, the route was still safeguarded, but this status was formally revoked in July 2025, allowing restoration of the canal through Staveley to proceed without threat.

=== Chesterfield Waterside ===
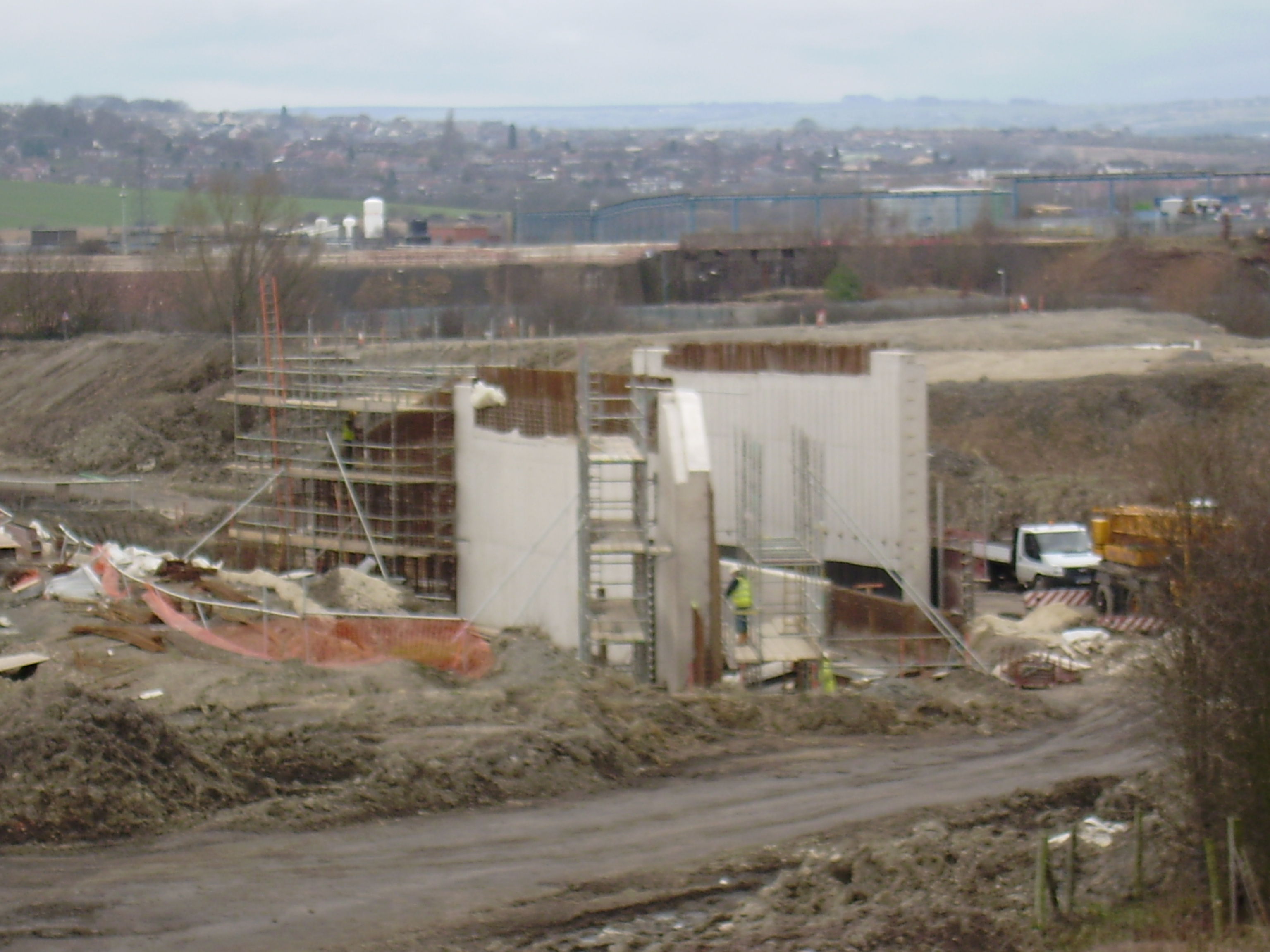
A new bridge under construction at Staveley Basin, to carry the A6192 link road over the new canal channel to Junction 29A of the M1.

The southern end of the canal in Chesterfield is being redeveloped as part of a £300 million project called Chesterfield Waterside. This will provide housing and amenities in an area which is currently derelict land. The project involves the creation of a short length of new canal to create an island in the centre of the site, navigation being restored to a length of the river, and a new basin at the southern edge of the site. Funding for the canal work was provided by a grant of £500,000 from the East Midlands Development Agency. The basin was completed and was opened in October 2009, although it remains isolated from the River Rother, to which it will be connected by a lock, while a back-pumping facility will supply it with water. Outline planning permission for the whole site was granted on 15 March 2010. In April 2012, the project was awarded a £2.4 million grant by the Sheffield City Region Local Enterprise Partnership Board. The funding was for the connecting lock and the provision of sewers and access roads, to facilitate the subsequent development of the 62-acre (25 ha) site.

=== Closing the gap ===
With the canal open from West Stockwith to the eastern portal of Norwood Tunnel, and from Chesterfield to Staveley, there were less than 9 miles (14 km) left to be restored by 2017. Whereas most of the work so far had involved restoration of the existing channel, this section includes some significant engineering challenges, with completely new construction needed to bypass the housing estate in Killamarsh, built over the original line in the 1970s, and the replacement of Norwood Tunnel with an alternative route. The Chesterfield Canal Partnership, an association of local and regional authorities, including the Chesterfield Canal Trust and other interested parties, have produced detailed plans for all of the work required to reinstate the missing section.

In 2004, the engineers Jacobs-Babtie examined six possible routes for the canal through Killamarsh. Of these, two were reasonably feasible, and were named Central Line East and Central Line West. At the time, the eastern route was felt to be the best option, and consultation with residents resulted in that route being included in the North East Derbyshire Local Plan. However, subsequent detailed design suggests that this may no longer be the best route. Redevelopment of the Tarran Bungalows site to the west of the village provided opportunities to reassess the western route, and it has gained support, as it would be more attractive for boaters, allowing them to access the village more readily. This route would also be considerably cheaper to construct that the eastern route. Both routes drop down into Nethermoor Lake, part of the Rother Valley Country Park and will ascend from the far side to regain the original course.

It will not be possible to reopen the Norwood Tunnel, as several sections have collapsed, the National Coal Board filled in some sections to stabilise the land above it, and when the M1 motorway was built, the tunnel below it was injection grouted, to ensure there would not be a subsequent collapse. The engineers Arup considered options for this section in 2007, proposing a route running largely on the surface, and crossing the site of the Kiveton Park Colliery, which closed in 1994. It involved an extra six locks at the top of the Norwood flight of 13 locks, passing under the motorway by using a farm underpass, and then descending through another six new locks, to enter the final 460 yards (420 m) of the tunnel. In 2012 the UK Government's announcement of the preferred route for the HS2 rail line extension to Leeds indicated that the line would conflict with the planned restoration of the Canal in several places. The Chesterfield Canal Trust campaigned to have the needs of the Canal taken into account during the consultation process. The July 2017 announcement on the phase 2b route to be developed removed blight from the canal route. This revised route for the HS2 railway resulted in other options being considered for the tunnel replacement route. One is for a short tunnel at the western end, starting at the existing western portal, but heading in a different direction. The tunnel would be some 660 yards (600 m) long, passing under the route of HS2 and the M1 motorway, allowing HS2 to be constructed without interfering with navigation. The scheme would save the need to construct six locks, and engineers were assessing the cost of such a scheme in late 2017.

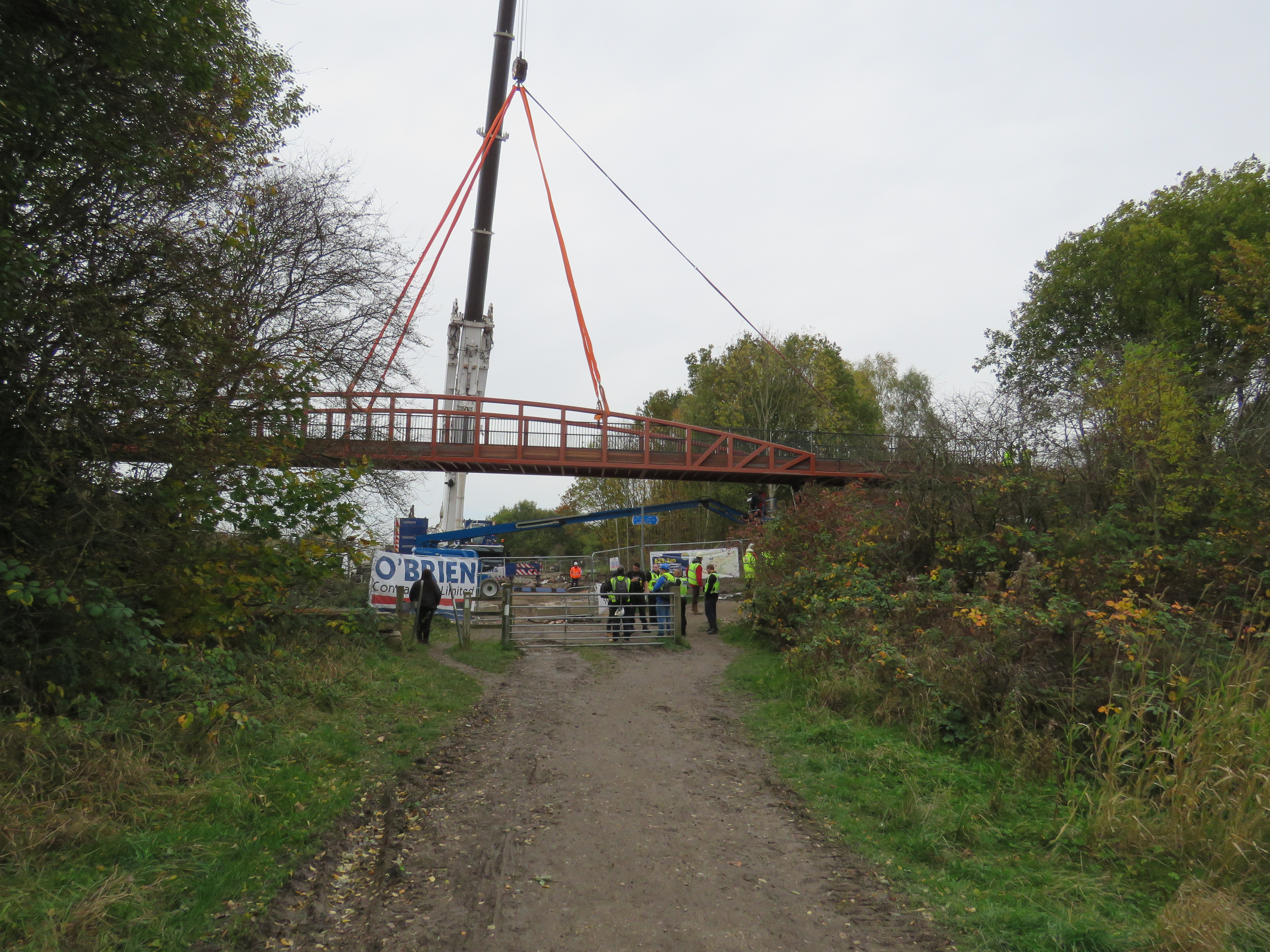
The Trans Pennine Trail bridge crossing the route of the canal at Staveley was installed in October 2024

In 2020, the Trust submitted a planning application covering reinstatement of the remaining 1.6-mile (2.6 km) section that lies within the borough of Chesterfield. HS2 opposed the application, on the basis that the two projects were incompatible, but in February 2021, an agreement was reached between the Trust and HS2 to allow both to be constructed. Planning permission was then granted for the reinstatement from Staveley to Renishaw, including Brindley's Puddle Bank which carries the canal across the valley of the River Doe Lea. The canal was breached after closure to prevent flooding by the river, which passed under the canal in a culvert, and the new crossing will feature a 120-foot (37 m) aqueduct. At Renishaw, 0.5 miles (0.8 km) of canal were restored in 2010 but have since become derelict again, due to a failure to reach agreement with the Environment Agency over water supplies. That issue should be resolved as part of the development. Meanwhile, Staveley Town Basin has been renamed Staveley Waterside, as plans for a new village with a hotel and marina have been announced by Derbyshire County Council.

In 2023, the canal trust received a grant of £5.3 million from the Staveley Town Deal, part of the £25.2 million awarded to Staveley in 2021 from the government's Towns Fund. The grant was expected to cover restoration of the canal from Staveley to the River Doe Lea crossing at the end of Staveley puddle bank. Some 160,000 cubic metres of clay were also donated by a local developer called Suon, with royalties for its extraction waived by the Chatsworth Estate. The clay will be used to rebuild the puddle bank, parts of which were removed in 1972 when it was bulldozed. Delays and escalating costs meant that the Staveley Town Deal award no longer covered the full restoration of the puddle bank, but on 25 October 2024, a new bridge carrying the Trans Pennine Trail over the route of the canal was installed. This allowed the canal to be restored beneath it, as far as Bellhouse Lane, where the entrance basin to the former Lowgates Arm provides a winding space.

== Features ==
What are often called "traditional" working narrowboats were the product of the main canal system – but the craft that plied the 46 miles between Chesterfield, Retford, and the River Trent were very different. Isolated on the fringes of the inland waterways network there were no outside canal influences to change the design of craft that were adequate for the job they had to do. The cabins were below-decks, and the boatmen always had a home ashore. Short journeys, usually with a crew of two, did not generate colourful decorations of roses-and-castles, nor did engines oust the towing horse, not even as late as the 1950s. None of the original "cuckoo" boats have survived, although the last one was extensively measured and recorded in 1976, prior to it being broken up. This has enabled the Canal Trust to create a new boat, named the Dawn Rose, which was constructed at Shireoaks Marina using traditional methods. Wood was bought in 2007, and construction started in 2011, with the boat being completed and launched in April 2015.

Norwood Tunnel was a 2,884-yard-long (2,637 m), 9.25-foot-wide (2.82 m) and 12-foot-high (3.7 m), brick-lined canal tunnel on the line of the Chesterfield Canal with its Western Portal in Norwood, Derbyshire and its Eastern Portal in Kiveton, South Yorkshire. Although a small section of it at the eastern end may be reused as part of the restoration, most of it will remain abandoned, as it has suffered from subsidence, and parts of it have been filled in.

Drakeholes Tunnel is a second, shorter tunnel 154 yards long also without a towpath built for the Chesterfield Canal at Drakeholes, Nottinghamshire a location between the Norwood Tunnel and the River Trent. In order to allow it to be navigated by wide-beam boats, it was built 16 feet (4.9 m) wide and 15.5 feet (4.7 m) high. Most of it was cut through solid sandstone, and so remained unlined until 1983, when some of the rock was found to be eroding.

Hollingwood Common Tunnel is a disused navigable coal mine adit which terminated at the Chesterfield Canal near Staveley. This tunnel was 1.75 miles (2.82 km) long, and its water level was maintained one foot (0.30 m) lower than that of the canal. This level was maintained by drainage through a culvert running beneath the canal, and required the transhipment of coal at the terminus. The boats used were loaded underground within the coal mine the tunnel served; these boats were 21 feet (6.4 m) long and 3 feet 6 inches (1.07 m) wide.

Proposals are at early stages for a link north from Killamarsh to the Sheffield and South Yorkshire Navigation along the River Rother, to be called the Rother Link. This would provide a way to reach the Chesterfield Canal without negotiating the tidal River Trent, and would create a new cruising ring, taking in the Rother Link, River Don Navigation, Stainforth and Keadby Canal, River Trent, and Chesterfield Canal.

The towpath of the canal has become a long-distance footpath and cycle route, stretching for 46 miles (74 km) from Chesterfield to West Stockwith, and is signposted as the "Cuckoo Way" after the name given to the boats which worked on the canal. Parts of the towpath beside the western section of the route are also part of the Trans Pennine Trail cycle route.

British Water Board worker Bill Thorpe holding a plug of the Chesterfield Canal in 1978

The Chesterfield Canal hit international headlines in 1978. While dredging the bottom of the canal to remove rubbish, a maintenance team pulled up a large chain which had a wooden plug attached to it. Later that day, it was noticed that a whirlpool had formed and it became evident that the section of the canal between Whitsunday Pie Lock and Retford Town Lock was losing water. The incident resulted in a Severn Trent Water Authority dredger and several other boats being temporarily stranded. Investigation revealed that the plug was an original engineering feature of the canal, having been installed in 1777 to allow sections to be drained for future maintenance purposes, but with records showings its location destroyed during World War II. The plug was identified as having contributed to leaks from the canal. The water drained (as designed) harmlessly into the nearby river Idle. The Retford event became a national and international story at the time, and was even recorded in Lloyd's List. However, these plugs were a common feature of English canals built at that time and other instances of sudden drainage (both purposeful and accidental) have since been recorded, including emptying of the Pontcysyllte Aqueduct on the Llangollen Canal.

== See also ==
- List of waterway societies in the United Kingdom
- List of canal tunnels in the United Kingdom
- List of canal locks in the United Kingdom
- Adelphi Canal
- Derby Canal
- Derby and Sandiacre Canal Trust
- Chesterfield Canal Trust

== Bibliography ==
- Auton, Rod (Winter 2017). "Restoration News". The Cuckoo. Chesterfield Canal Trust. ISSN 1470-3467.
- Broomhead, Michael (6 February 2021). "HS2 withdraws objection to Chesterfield Canal restoration plans after agreement reached". Derbyshire Times. Archived from the original on 6 February 2021.
- Coles, Geraint (March 2010). Next Navigation East: Options for replacing the Norwood Tunnel. Chesterfield Canal Partnership. Archived from the original on 7 April 2019.
- Coles, Geraint (March 2013a). Next Navigation West: Design Summary for Restoration Section 3: Renishaw (PDF) (2nd ed.). Chesterfield Canal Partnership. Archived (PDF) from the original on 8 January 2018.
- Coles, Geraint (March 2013b). Next Navigation West: Design Summary for Restoration Section 5: Killamarsh West (PDF) (2nd ed.). Chesterfield Canal Partnership. Archived (PDF) from the original on 26 June 2018.
- Coles, Geraint (March 2013c). Next Navigation West: Will the Brindley Loops be restored? (excerpt) (2nd ed.). Chesterfield Canal Partnership. Archived from the original on 7 April 2019.
- Cumberlidge, Jane (2009). Inland Waterways of Great Britain (8th ed.). Imray Laurie Norie and Wilson. ISBN 978-1-84623-010-3.
- De Salis, Henry Rodolph (1969). Bradshaw's Canals and Navigable Rivers. David & Charles. ISBN 978-0-7153-4689-1.
- Falconer, Keith (January 2017). An appraisal of the heritage and archaeology of England's present and former inland navigable waterways. Historic England.
- Garner, E (2003). The Seven Canals of Derbyshire. Landmark Publishing. ISBN 978-1-84306-072-7.
- Glover, Stephen (1829). The history of the county of Derbyshire, Vol 1. Henry Mozley and Son.
- Hadfield, Charles (1970). The Canals of the East Midlands. David and Charles. ISBN 978-0-7153-4871-0.
- Killamarsh (2017). "Restoring the Canal through Killamarsh" (PDF). Chesterfield Canal Partnership. Archived from the original (PDF) on 9 January 2018.
- Lower, John (April 2002). "Schandelle visits the Chesterfield Canal". Waterways World. ISSN 0309-1422.
- Lower, John (March 2007). "Culvert Collapse". Waterways World. ISSN 0309-1422.
- Nicholson (2006). Nicholson Guides Vol 6: Nottingham, York & the North East. Harper Collins. ISBN 978-0-00-721114-2.
- Potter, Hugh (May 2009). "Boats back to Chesterfield". Waterways World. ISSN 0309-1422.
- Potter, Hugh (December 2012). "A New Dawn". Waterways World. ISSN 0309-1422.
- Priestley, Joseph (1831). "Historical Account of the Navigable Rivers, Canals and Railways of Great Britain". Archived from the original on 7 March 2016.
- Richardson, Christine (1992). The Waterways Revolution: From the Peaks to the Trent 1768–1778. Images. ISBN 978-1-85421-161-3.
- Richardson, Christine, ed. (1996). Minutes of the Chesterfield Canal Company 1771–80. Derbyshire Record Society. ISBN 978-0-946324-20-0.
- Richardson, Christine (2004). James Brindley: Canal Pioneer. Waterways World. ISBN 978-1-870002-95-0.
- Richardson, Christine (2006). Chesterfield History Nuggets. Richlow Histories. ISBN 978-0-9552609-1-9.
- Richardson, Christine (2007). Yorkshire Stone to London: To Create the Houses of Parliament. Richlow Histories. ISBN 978-0-9552609-2-6.
- Richardson, Christine (2009). Norwood Tunnel: Four Centuries of Challenge. Richlow Histories. Richlow Histories. ISBN 978-0-9552609-6-4.
- Richardson, Christine; Lower, John (2006). Chesterfield Canal. Richlow Guides. ISBN 978-0-9552609-0-2.
- Roffey, James (1989). The Chesterfield Canal. Barracuda Books. ISBN 978-0-86023-461-6.
- Skempton, Sir Alec; et al. (2002). A Biographical Dictionary of Civil Engineers in Great Britain and Ireland: Vol 1: 1500 to 1830. Thomas Telford. ISBN 978-0-7277-2939-2.
- Squires, Roger (2008). Britain's restored canals. Landmark Publishing. ISBN 978-1-84306-331-5.
