= Tinkersick =

Coordinates: 53°15′00″N 1°23′58″W

Location
- Country: England

Physical characteristics
- Source
  - location: Chesterfield Canal

Tinkersick or Tinker Sick is a stream east of Chesterfield, near Brimington in Derbyshire. The stream is an offshoot of the Chesterfield Canal.

A breach in the Chesterfield canal in March 2007, caused by the collapse of a culvert carrying the Tinkersick under the canal, forced temporary closure of all but the top pound above Tapton Lock for about six weeks.

== Colliery ==
Tinkersick Colliery operated until the mid 20th Century, being purchased by the Chesterfield Coal Co. Ltd in 1930 from the Hall Brothers.

== See also ==
- List of rivers of England
