= Listed buildings in Kidsgrove =

Kidsgrove is a civil parish in the district of Newcastle-under-Lyme, Staffordshire, England. The parish contains 29 listed buildings that are recorded in the National Heritage List for England. All the listed buildings are designated at Grade II, the lowest of the three grades, which is applied to "buildings of national importance and special interest". The parish contains the town of Kidsgrove, The villages of Talke and Newchapel, and part of the village of Mow Cop. The Trent and Mersey Canal passes through the parish, and the listed buildings associated with it are bridges, tunnel portals, and a milepost. Also listed are three tunnel portals built by the North Staffordshire Railway. The other listed buildings include a village cross with a medieval base, houses and cottages, farmhouses and farm buildings, churches, a vicarage, a chapel with a manse, a memorial in a churchyard, a folly, a tower, and a war memorial.

== Buildings ==
| Name and location | Photograph | Date | Notes |
|---|---|---|---|
| Cross, Talke; 53.07599°N 2.26149°W | | 13th century (probable) | The village cross stands to the west of Cross House, and was restored in 1887. It is in stone, and has a medieval stepped base with an inscribed panel. On the base is a square shaft with wide chamfers, and it is surmounted by a cross. |
| Wood Shutt Farmhouse; 53.08635°N 2.25141°W | — | c. 1500 | The farmhouse has a timber framed core with cruck construction, it has been clad and partly rebuilt in brick, and has a tile roof. There are two storeys and a T-shaped plan, with a front of three bays, and a rear wing. In the centre is a doorway, and the windows are casements. Inside, there is exposed timber framing and a cruck truss. |
| Harecastle Farmhouse; 53.06853°N 2.25140°W | — | c. 1600 | A large farmhouse in Jacobean style, built in stone with a tile roof. There are two storeys and an attic, and a U-shaped plan, consisting of a hall range and flanking gabled cross-wings. The windows are chamfered and mullioned with hood moulds, and the doorway has a square head and a massive lintel. |
| Farm building, Church Farm; 53.07518°N 2.26150°W | — | Late 17th century | The farm building, which was later extended, is timber framed with painted brick infill, an extension to the south is in brick, and the roof is tiled. There is one storey and three bays. |
| Crown Bank Cottage, Talke; 53.07294°N 2.26150°W | | Late 17th century | The house, which was later extended, is timber framed with plastered infill, the extension is in plastered brick, and the roof is tiled. There are two storeys and three bays. The door has a rectangular fanlight, and most of the windows are casements, one with a segmental head. |
| Mow House Farmhouse; 53.11106°N 2.20889°W | — | Early 18th century | The farmhouse is in rendered brick with stone dressings, quoins, and a tile roof. There are three storeys and a double-pile plan, with a main range of three bays, and a stone service range to the north. The central doorway has a moulded surround and a raised keystone, and the windows are casements. |
| Mow Cop Castle; 53.11315°N 2.21434°W | | 1754 | This is a folly built as an eyecatcher from Rode Hall by Randle Wilbraham. It stands on an outcrop of rock, and is built in sandstone. The folly consists of a round tower with an attached wall containing an arch, all deliberately ruinous. There are round openings in the lower part of the tower, and in the wall. |
| Harecastle Tunnel portals and retaining wall 53.08466°N 2.24434°W | | 1766–67 | The earlier portal is by James Brindley, and the later portal dates from 1824 to 1827 and is by Thomas Telford. They are in brown brick with stone coping. Brindley's portal is recessed to the right and has a rounded arch. Telford's portal has a rounded arch and a rusticated surround. the portals are linked by a retaining wall that continues for about 100 yards (91 m) and contains pilaster buttresses. |
| James Brindley memorial 53.08737°N 2.20667°W | — | 1772 | The memorial is in the churchyard of St James' Church, Newchapel, and is to the memory of James Brindley. It consists of an inscribed stone grave slab. On the slab is a metal plaque listing some of the events in his life. |
| Cross House, Talke; 53.07608°N 2.26141°W | | Late 18th century | A red brick house with dressings in painted stone or plaster, a sill band, a moulded eaves cornice and blocking course, and a tile roof. There are two storeys and three bays. In the centre is a doorway with a Tuscan surround, a fanlight, and a pediment. The outer bays contain two-storey tripartite bow windows with shafts, pilasters and entablatures, and sash windows. |
| Tower at NGR SJ 84025407; 53.08361°N 2.24993°W | — | Late 18th century (probable) | The tower is in stone, and is cylindrical. In the ground floor are three round-headed doorways, above which is an iron band, and in the upper floor are two rectangular loops. |
| St Martin's Church, Talke; 53.07559°N 2.26183°W | | 1794 | The church was later altered and extended. The original part is in red brick with blue headers, the north transept, dating from about 1850, is in stone, and the roof is tiled. The church consists of a nave, a north transept, and an chancel with a round-ended apse. At the west end is a 19th-century square bellcote with a lead-covered pyramidal roof. The windows have round heads and keystones, and contain Y-tracery, and the 19th-century west doorway has a pointed head and panelled spandrels. |
| Bridge No. 132; 53.08538°N 2.24400°W | | c. 1824–27 | The bridge crosses the Trent and Mersey Canal and consists of a single low segmental arch. It is in red and blue brick with a stone parapet band and coping, and a rusticated surround to the arch. |
| Milepost opposite Harecastle Tunnel portals 53.08481°N 2.24454°W | | 1824–27 (probable) | The milepost is on the towpath of the Trent and Mersey Canal. It is in cast iron and consists of a cylindrical post with two panels indicating the distances in miles to Preston Brook and Shardlow. |
| Bourne Cottage; 53.08262°N 2.24328°W | — | Early 19th century | A cottage orné in Gothic style, it is roughcast, with a half-hipped slate roof. There is one storey and three bays. On the front is a central doorway with a fanlight flanked by tripartite casement windows. Above them is a continuous hood mould, and in front of them is a fretted verandah screen with three lancet openings. |
| Crown Bank House, Talke; 53.07281°N 2.26123°W | — | Early 19th century | The house is in painted brick, and has a hipped tile roof. There are two storeys, a front range of four bays, and a rear wing. In the centre, steps lead up to a doorway with attached Roman Doric half-columns, a rectangular fanlight, and an entablature. The doorway is flanked by single-storey canted bay windows, on the right return is a two-storey canted bay window, and the other windows are sashes or French windows. |
| Jasmine Lodge; 53.07113°N 2.25192°W | — | Early 19th century | The former lodge is on the north side of the entrance to the drive to Clough Hall, now demolished. It has plastered walls, a modillion eaves cornice and blocking course, and a pyramidal felted roof. There is one storey and a square plan. The west front has a sash window flanked by columns in a recess, outside which are semicircular-headed niches. The south front is similar, with a square bay window in the recess. |
| Lodge south of Jasmine Lodge; 53.07162°N 2.25197°W | — | Early 19th century | The former lodge is on the south side of the entrance to the drive to Clough Hall, now demolished. It has plastered walls, a modillion eaves cornice and blocking course, and a pyramidal felted roof. There is one storey and a square plan. The central door is flanked by casement windows. On the north front is a square bay window in a recess, flanked by semicircular-headed niches. |
| Bridge over Macclesfield Canal; 53.08833°N 2.24708°W | | 1829 | The bridge carries the towpath over the Macclesfield Canal near its junction with the Trent and Mersey Canal. It is in red brick with stone dressings and consists of a single segmental arch. The bridge has a stone parapet band, a plain parapet, and rusticated voussoirs. On the south side the bridge ends in square piers, and on the north side it curves into the ground. |
| St Thomas' Church, Kidsgrove; 53.08399°N 2.24309°W | | 1837 | The chancel was added in 1853 by George Gilbert Scott. The body of the church and the tower are in red and blue brick, the chancel is in freestone, and the roof is tiled. The church consists of a nave, a chancel, and an embraced west tower. The tower has four stages, a west door, clock faces, and an embattled parapet. |
| St Thomas' Church, Mow Cop; 53.11269°N 2.21013°W | | 1841–42 | A Commissioners' Church, it is built in freestone and has a slate roof. The church consists of a nave, a chancel with a vestry, and a west tower. The tower has three stages, diagonal buttresses, a west door and a west window, both with pointed heads, and an embattled parapet. The windows are lancets. |
| Former School, Mow Cop; 53.11299°N 2.20987°W | | 1843 | The former school is built in freestone with quoins and a slate roof, and is in Gothic style. There is one storey and two parallel ranges, with a front of three bays. In the middle bay is a projecting gabled porch that has a doorway with a pointed head in the left return, and the windows are lancets. |
| St. Thomas's Vicarage, Mow Cop; 53.11322°N 2.20972°W | — | c. 1843 | The vicarage is built in freestone, with quoins and a slate roof with coped verges on shaped kneelers. There are two storeys, a three-bay main range, a projecting gabled cross-wing on the left, and a lower two-storey service wing to the right. The doorway has a raised keystone, a fanlight, and a pediment, and the windows are casements. |
| North portal of Harecastle North Railway Tunnel; 53.08115°N 2.24072°W | — | 1848 | The tunnel, now disused, was built by the North Staffordshire Railway. The portal is in engineering brick, and it consists of a semi-elliptical arch. The portal has a rusticated stone surround, it is flanked by wide pilaster buttresses, and has a low brick parapet. |
| South portal of Harecastle North Railway Tunnel; 53.08002°N 2.24005°W | — | 1848 | The tunnel, now disused, was built by the North Staffordshire Railway. The portal is in engineering brick, and it consists of a semi-elliptical arch. The portal has a rusticated stone surround, it is flanked by wide pilaster buttresses, and has a low brick parapet. |
| North portal of Harecastle South Railway Tunnel; 53.07854°N 2.23960°W | | 1848 | The tunnel, now disused, was built by the North Staffordshire Railway. The portal is in engineering brick, and it consists of a semi-elliptical arch. The portal has a rusticated stone surround, it is flanked by wide pilaster buttresses, and has a low brick parapet. |
| Former stable west of St. Thomas' Vicarage, Mow Cop; 53.11316°N 2.20991°W | — | Mid 19th century | The stable, later used for other purposes, is in stone, and has a slate roof with stepped gables. There is one storey, and it contains garage doors and a casement window. |
| Mow Cop Wesleyan Chapel and Manse; 53.10990°N 2.21598°W | | 1852 | The chapel is in stone on a plinth, with coved and moulded eaves, and a hipped slate roof The sides have three bays, and the windows have semicircular heads. In the south front is a doorway with a semicircular head, pilasters, and a moulded cornice hood. The west front contains a doorway with pilasters, a fanlight with a keystone, and an open pediment, above which is a circular window. The manse at right angles to the left is in stone with a coved eaves band and a tile roof. There are two storeys and two bays, and the windows are sashes. |
| War Memorial, Kidsgrove; 53.08638°N 2.24104°W | | c. 1920 | The war memorial is in the churchyard St John the Evangelist's Church and consists of a Calvary with the statue of Christ in stone on a timber cross. In front are three stone statues depicting the Virgin Mary, St John the Baptist and, probably, Mary Magdalene. In front of these are two plaques with inscriptions and the names of those lost in the two World Wars. |
