= Adelphi Canal =

Canal in Derbyshire, England

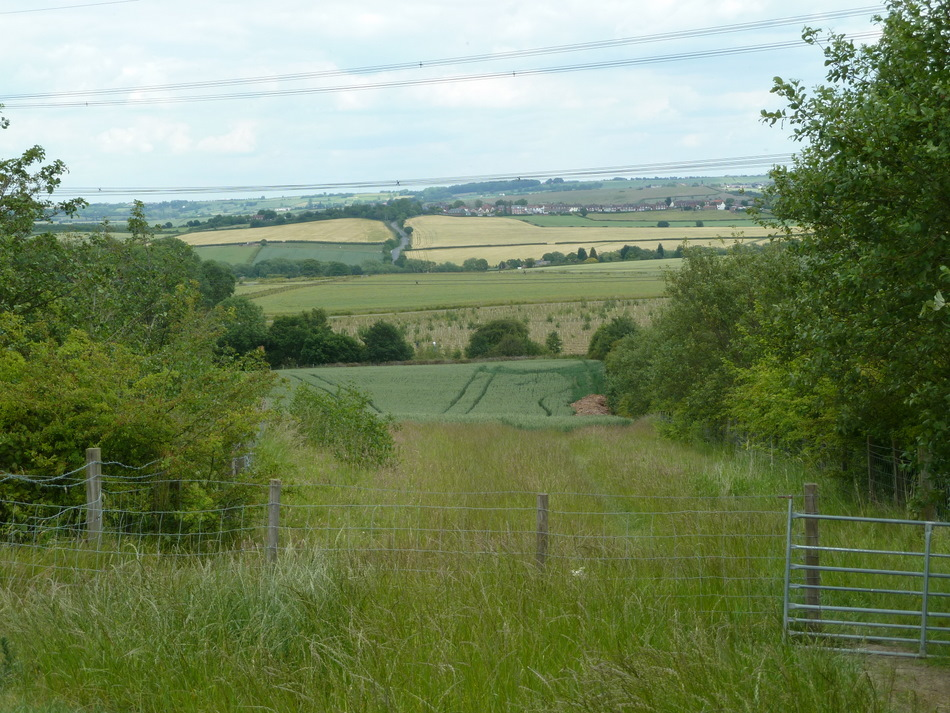
- The Adelphi Ironworks and canal wharf were near the centre of this picture, but at a higher level, as the ground has been stripped away by open cast coal mining.

Specifications
- Locks: 0
- Status: destroyed by mining

History
- Date completed: 1799
- Date closed: unknown

Geography
- Start point: Adelphi Ironworks
- End point: Staveley Road bridge
- Connects to: Poolsbrook

The Adelphi Canal was a small privately owned canal in Duckmanton, near Chesterfield, England, built in 1799. It was used to transport pig iron from an ironworks to a wharf by a road. It is not connected to any waterway. The iron was forwarded by road to the Chesterfield Canal.

== History ==
The Smith family were prominent in Sheffield's economy from the second half of the 18th century, being involved in the iron and coal industries. This lasted through the American Wars of Independence and the Napoleonic War. Ebenezer Smith (1756–1827) had an iron works at Brampton which was casting products such as munitions. It also cast Newcomen engines mainly used to pump out water from mines. Family holdings were mines outside the city at Calow, Hady, Hollingwood, Inkersall and Staveley, and ironworks at Brampton, Calow and Stonegravels.

The Adelphi Ironworks were built in Long Duckmanton around 1799. Twin furnaces could produce 900 tons of pig iron in a year, which was used for munitions. Due to the poor condition of roads in winter, many ironworks' winter output was stockpiled until the summer. To bypass this delay, Smith decided to have built this canal. It imitated the Poolsbrook or Pools Brook from the mine to near where Tom Lane meets Staveley Road. From here roads run 1.7 miles (2.7 km) to the Chesterfield Canal, where the cargos would be laden for taking to the River Trent and beyond. The canal was supplied with water which was pumped from the mines by a Newcomen engine, which had been modified by James Watt.

The c. 1/2-mile (0.80 km) canal was built as a wooden trough. Small boats were used which were capable of carrying 1.5 tons, and all goods had to be transhipped twice to reach the Chesterfield Canal. An obvious solution would have been to continue the canal north, having to cross the Duke of Devonshire's land. The ironworks ran into difficulties in the 1820s, with accusations of illegal mining activity, and the Duke of Devonshire cancelled the Smith's lease of Staveley Upperground colliery and for ironstone at the Hady mines in 1832.

No record of the canal's cessation is known.

== Today ==
The Adelphi ironworks and the start of the canal were just north of Arkwright Town. Houses to its south were removed as affected by methane from the mines. Remnants of the works were in the buildings of Works Farm until at least the 1980s. Mining afterwards has resulted in an open-cast mine, removing most remainings traces of the canal and works.

The weigh bridge and pattern shop remain.

Point	Coordinates (Links to map resources)	OS Grid Ref	Notes
Adelphi Ironworks	53.238°N 1.356°W	SK430714	Start of canal
Tom Lane Colliery	53.239°N 1.347°W	SK436715	
Tom Lane/Staveley Road	53.244°N 1.352°W	SK432721	The Poolsbrook crossed the roads here

== See also ==
- Canals of the United Kingdom
- History of the British canal system
- Waterscape

== Bibliography ==
- Bridgewater, A N (28 January 2009). "North Derbyshire Collieries" (PDF). AditNow. Archived (PDF) from the original on 26 June 2016.
- Glover, Stepher (1831). "The History and gazetteer of the county of Derby".
