= Harecastle Tunnel =

Canal tunnel in Staffordshire, England

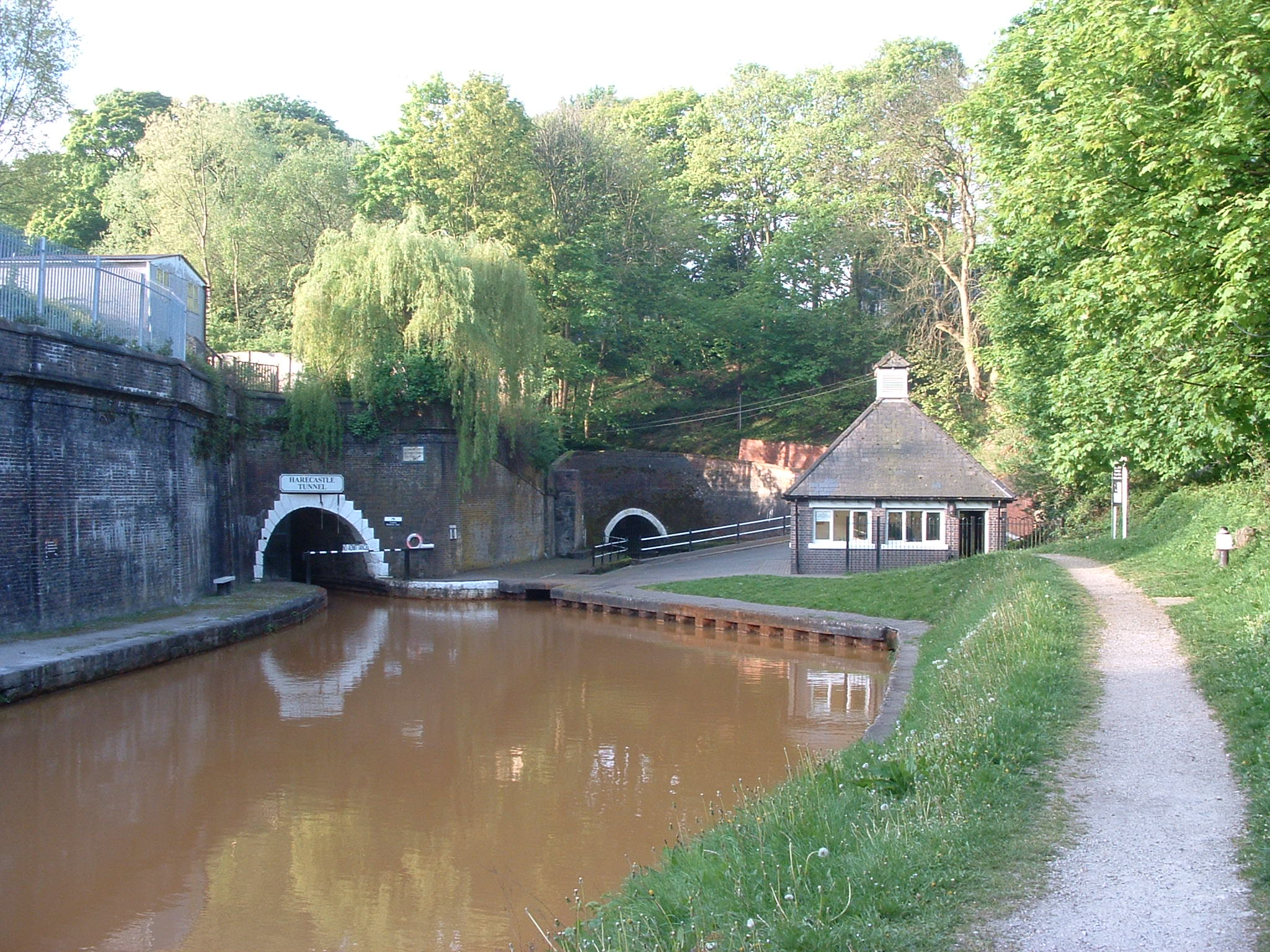
- Northern end of Telford's Harecastle Tunnel (left) next to the disused Brindley tunnel (right).
- Interactive map of Harecastle Tunnel

Overview
- Location: Kidsgrove to Tunstall, Staffordshire, England
- Coordinates: 53°4′27″N 2°14′11″W
- OS grid reference: SJ843529
- Status: Open
- Waterway: Trent and Mersey Canal
- Start: 53°3′46.62″N 2°13′35.64″W (Southern Portal)
- End: 53°5′4.44″N 2°14′39.24″W (Northern Portal)

Operation
- Constructed: 1824–1827
- Owner: Canal & River Trust

Technical
- Design engineer: Thomas Telford
- Length: 2,675 m (8,776 ft)
- Towpath: No (removed)
- Boat-passable: Yes

Harecastle Tunnel is a canal tunnel on the Trent and Mersey Canal in Staffordshire between Kidsgrove and Tunstall. The tunnel, which is 1.6 mi (2.6 km) long, was once one of the longest in the country. Its industrial purpose was for the transport of coal to the kilns in the Staffordshire Potteries. The canal runs under the 195 m (640 ft) Harecastle Hill near Goldenhill, the highest district in Stoke-on-Trent.

Although described singularly as a tunnel, Harecastle is actually two separate but parallel tunnels built almost 50 years apart. The first was constructed by James Brindley in the late 18th century and the second larger tunnel was designed by Thomas Telford, and opened in the late 1820s.

Only the Telford tunnel remains navigable after a partial collapse closed the Brindley tunnel shortly before the First World War. As the Telford tunnel is only wide enough for a single boat, canal traffic is managed by sending alternating northbound and southbound groups of boats through the tunnel. Ventilation is provided by large electric fans at the south portal.

== Brindley Tunnel ==
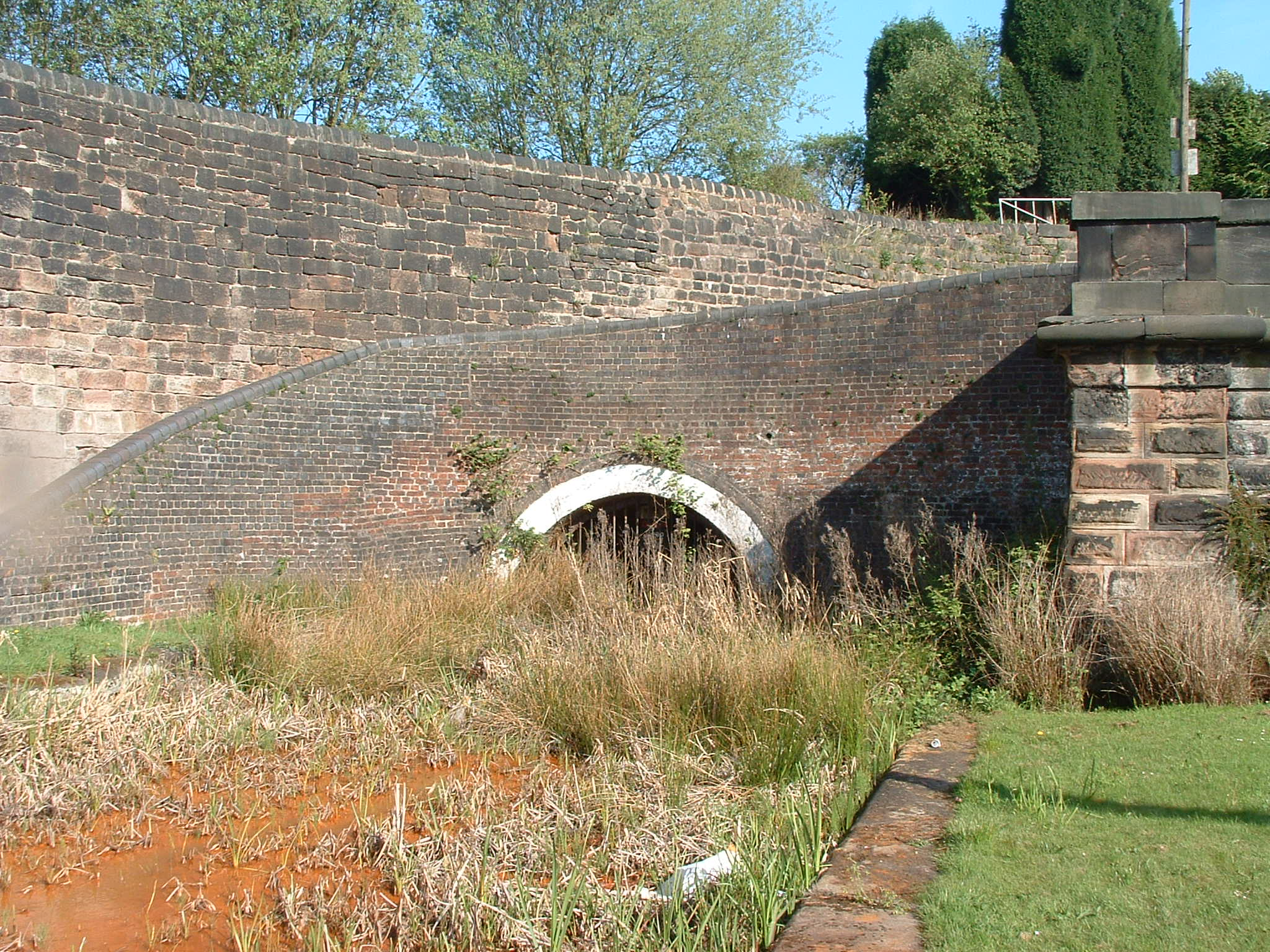
The overgrown southern portal of the Brindley tunnel

The first tunnel through Harecastle Hill was designed by canal engineer, James Brindley. Construction began in 1770 when the surveyed route of the tunnel was marked over the hill. Fifteen vertical shafts were then sunk into the ground from which navvies mined outwards from the bottom of the shafts to create the canal line. However, changes in rock type which ranged from soft earth to Millstone Grit caused engineering problems.

The tunnel sites also flooded regularly until Watt steam engines were introduced to operate pumps. Stoves were installed at the bottom of upcast pipes to overcome the problem of ventilation. Despite the death of Brindley in 1772, the first tunnel – which measured 2,880 yd (2,630 m) long – was completed in 1777. On opening, it overtook Norwood Tunnel on the Chesterfield Canal (also bored by Brindley) as the longest tunnel on Britain's canal network.

As the tunnel had no towpath, boatsmen had to leg their way through; travel time averaged three hours. While the narrowboats went via the tunnel, boat horses were led over Harecastle Hill via "Boathorse Road". A lodgekeeper (now Bourne Cottage at 53°4′57.26″N 2°14′35.75″W) monitored the movement of the tow-horses, who were often led by boat children, as they crossed the high ground between Kidsgrove and Tunstall.

Within years of the Brindley tunnel opening, its limitation in design soon became evident. The Industrial Revolution had resulted in rapid growth and increased demand for coal and other raw materials in the Potteries. However, as the canal tunnel was only 12 ft (3.7 m) high at its tallest point and had a maximum width of 9 ft (2.7 m), its limited capacity had become a major problem. In the early 19th century, it was decided that a second tunnel should be built by Thomas Telford. Brindley tunnel was used for the rest of the 19th century until it began to suffer an increase in subsidence in the early 20th century. In 1914 it was closed permanently after a partial collapse.

Regular engineering inspections of the disused Brindley tunnel ceased in the 1960s. Since then, no further exploration of the interior has been made beyond any significant distance from the north or south portals. Both entrances are gated and are no longer reachable by boat. Water entering the canal from the Brindley tunnel has been blamed for much of the prominent iron ore leaching into the canal (responsible for the rusty colour of the water). A reed bed has been installed at the south portal to filter the water.

== Telford Tunnel ==
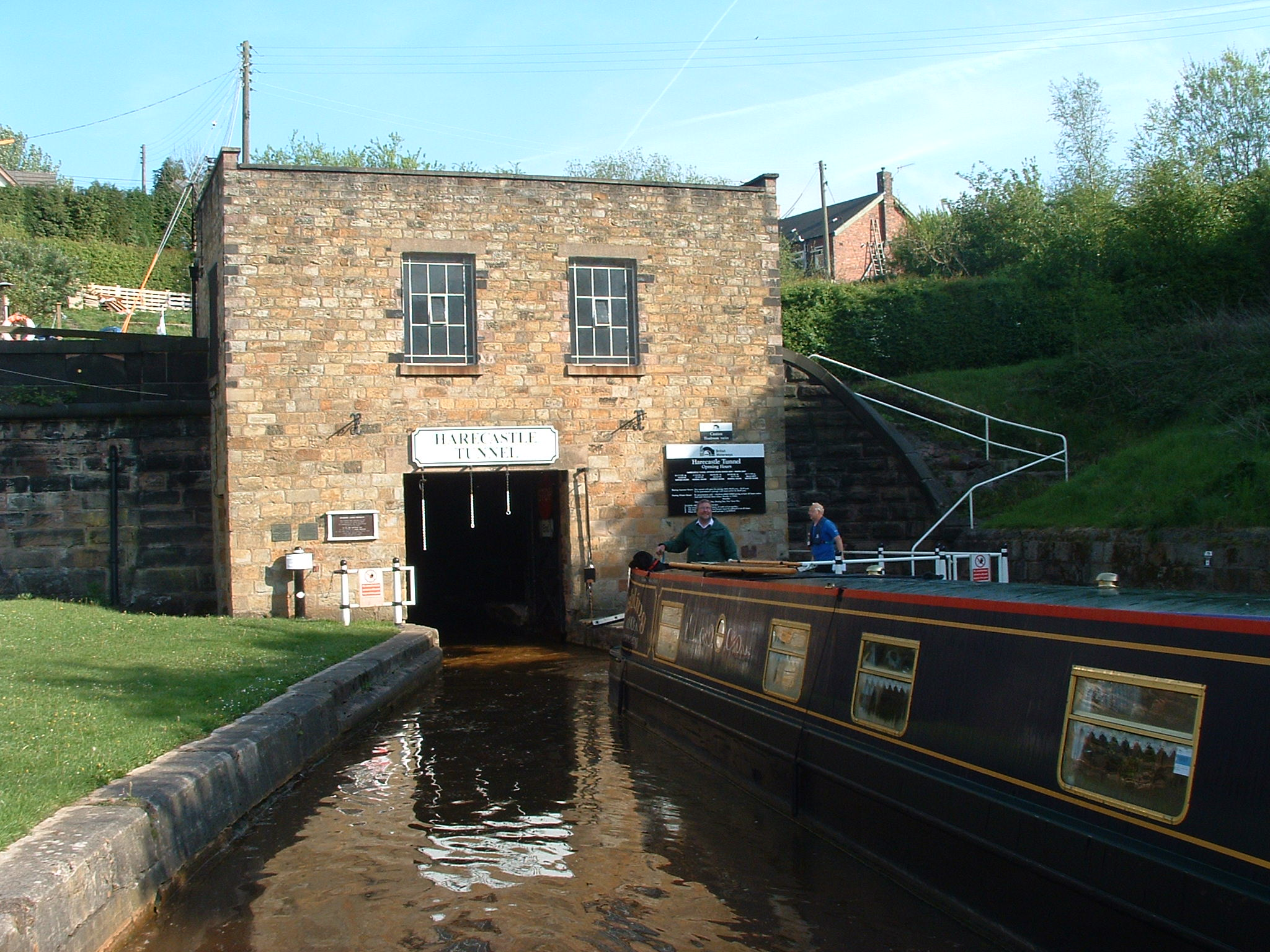
The fan room above the southern portal of the Telford tunnel

Due to the amount of traffic and the slow process of legging, Brindley's Harecastle Tunnel had become a major bottleneck on the Trent and Mersey Canal by the start of the 19th century. By the early 1820s, a commission decided that a second tunnel was required. The esteemed Scottish civil engineer, Thomas Telford, was contracted to carry out the work. Construction started on Tuesday 13 April 1824 when the first clod was cut on the Pottery side.

Due to advances in civil engineering, the larger tunnel was completed after only three years of work, and at a cost of £113,000 (equivalent to £10.3 million in 2025). The principal works were completed on 24 November 1826 when James Caldwell, chairman of the company, laid the last brick. It was opened for navigation on 30 April 1827.

As it had a towpath, horses could now pull boats through the 2,926 yd (2,676 m) tunnel greatly shortening journey times. The towpath was built on a series of arches which allowed for circulation of water as boats were hauled through the tunnel. The boats using the tunnel had a beam of 7 feet (2.1 m) and their maximum load was 30 tons. The time occupied in a single journey with a boat hauled by a horse was about 90 minutes.

It was used in conjunction with the Brindley tunnel, with each tunnel taking boat traffic in opposite directions.

Inside the Telford tunnel are the remains of a series of smaller canal tunnels that connected to coal mines around Goldenhill. As the tunnels led directly to the underground workings of the collieries, coal could be loaded straight into boats avoiding the need for it to be hauled to the surface. The tunnels also helped provide much-needed drainage for the mines. Only small narrowboats with 10 t (11 tons) capacity could use these side tunnels.

Settlement in the tunnel lowered the headroom, and the towpath subsided beneath the water in places. As a result, an electric tug was introduced in 1914 at a cost of £1,563 (equivalent to £160,000 in 2025). A generating station and gas producer house were erected at the southern end of the tunnel with two sets of Campbell producer plant for 77 b.h.p. engines, two 77 b.h.p. Campbell gas engines, two 45 Kw direct current “Witton” dynamos and switchboard equipment. This charged a set of accumulators which were fitted in two accumulator boats built by Bullivant and Co. of Millwall, one being in use whilst the other was being charged. The tug fitted with electric motors was fed by the accumulators. The tug hauled itself through the tunnel by means of winding a cable which lay on the bottom of the canal and was secured at each end of the tunnel. The tug was capable of hauling a train of 17 boats through the tunnel in about 40 minutes at a charge of 6d a boat (equivalent to £2.49 in 2025).

A second tug was added in 1931. The tug operated until 1954 when system of 3×38 inches (97 cm) fans was constructed at the south portal to improve ventilation for diesel-powered craft. While boats are within the tunnel an airtight door is shut so fresh air is constantly drawn through the tunnel. The fans protect boaters from the harmful build-up of diesel fumes. Modern journey times are now about 30–40 minutes.

In the latter part of the 20th century, the Telford tunnel suffered further subsidence resulting in its temporary closure in 1973. It was reopened on 2 April 1977 by Sir Frank Price, chairman of the British Waterways Board. During this time, the long-disused towpath was removed to increase the width of the tunnel and improve air capacity in the tunnel.

== See also ==
- List of canal tunnels in Great Britain
- Listed buildings in Kidsgrove

Records
Preceded by Norwood Tunnel	Longest tunnel 1777–1789	Succeeded by Sapperton Canal Tunnel
