= Hugh Henshall =

English civil engineer

Hugh Henshall (1734–1816) was an English civil engineer, noted for his work on canals. He was born in north Staffordshire and was a student of the canal engineer James Brindley, who was also his brother-in-law.

== Private life ==
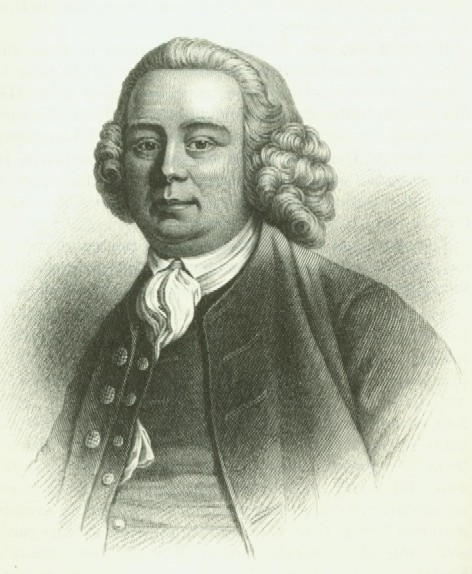
James Brindley

Henshall was born to John Henshall and Anne Cartwright (d. February 1776), most likely in Newchapel, Wolstanton. They had five children between 1731 and 1747. Henshall's father John may have assisted James Brindley on early surveys of the Trent and Mersey Canal. The two families became close, and Henshall became a pupil of Brindley. Henshall later met John Gilbert, his brother Thomas Gilbert, and Josiah Clowes. Henshall's sister, Jane, married William Clowes, a local landowner with mining interests and elder brother of Josiah Clowes. Another sister of Henshall, Anne, married James Brindley on 8 December 1765 when she was 19, and he was 49.

In 1778 Henshall purchased the farm and surrounding lands at Greenway Bank, near Tunstall in Staffordshire.

Henshall died on 16 November 1816 and is buried at St. James, in Newchapel.

== Waterways engineering ==
Henshall worked with Brindley and John Smeaton in 1758 to survey the proposed Trent and Mersey Canal. In 1765 he helped survey the River Weaver from Winsford to Lowton, and in the same year planned a link from Cheshire to the Bridgewater Canal, and surveyed the River Severn. In 1768 Brindley, assisted by Henshall, surveyed the route of the Staffordshire and Worcestershire Canal. Henshall carried out the survey for the act of Parliament, with Samuel Simcock.

Henshall's experience surveying the River Weaver became invaluable. He was made clerk of works on the Trent and Mersey Canal, and made the parliamentary map of the canal. James Brindley, engineer for the canal, died in 1772. Henshall became Brindley's heir, and continued his work, completing the Harecastle Tunnel and the northern reaches of the canal including the junction with the Bridgewater Canal. He completed the canal in May 1777. Brindley had also surveyed the route of the Chesterfield Canal in 1769, and was supervising its construction at the time of his death. John Varley moved from being clerk of works to Resident Engineer with Henshall appointed Chief Engineer in 1774. The canal was to be built as a narrow canal, but in 1775, nine shareholders offered to fund the extra cost of making it a broad canal from Retford to Stockwith. The death of Henshall's mother, and his absence led to criticism from the canal company for not attending to the work. Henshall also completed the Bridgewater Canal in 1776.

In December 1787, along with two other engineers, he investigated flooding on the Mersey and Irwell Navigation and noted that the navigable depth at Hollins Ferry was 2 feet to 2 feet 9 inches, whereas it had been 1 foot 8 inches sixteen years previously.

In 1790 he was asked to survey the route of the proposed Manchester, Bolton and Bury Canall. He produced a written report which helped assuage the fears of local mill owners, worried that the new canal would harm their water supply. He was a member of the committee to the canal, and a subscriber to the scheme, making an initial investment of £1,000 in shares. He also helped engage contractors during construction of the canal.

In 1792 Henshall was asked to re-survey Josiah Clowes's plans for the route of the Herefordshire and Gloucestershire Canal, and recommended a diversion to Newent, where there were minor coalfields. The following year, along with Charles McNiven, he returned to the Mersey and Irwell navigation to perform a survey. He reported that if the locks and cuts were kept in good order and the millers prevented from lowering the water level that the navigation could be more successful and more reliable.

Henshall and Thomas Dadford, Jr. (another pupil of James Brindley) surveyed the line of the Monmouthshire & Brecon Canal for a tramroad from Llan-march Coal and Mine Works to the Clydach ironworks. Henshall also worked for William Jessop while he was advising on the line of the Grand Western Canal. In 1795 Henshall completed the survey of the Caldon Canal.

== Other business interests ==
Henshall's purchase of Greenway Bank allowed him to concentrate on his canal carrying business, "Hugh Henshall & Co." This company became the carrying company for the proprietors of the Trent and Mersey Canal. The business was a success and in 1786 was taken over by Pickfords. He also became involved in the pottery trade with Robert Williamson at Longport.

== See also ==
- History of the British canal system
- Waterways in the United Kingdom
- List of civil engineers
