= Listed buildings in Wrockwardine =

Wrockwardine is a civil parish in the district of Telford and Wrekin, Shropshire, England. It contains 56 listed buildings that are recorded in the National Heritage List for England. Of these, one is listed at Grade I, the highest of the three grades, four are at Grade II*, the middle grade, and the others are at Grade II, the lowest grade. The parish contains villages and smaller settlements, including Wrockwardine, Admaston, Allscott, Leaton, and Walcot, and is otherwise rural. Most of the listed buildings are houses and associated structures, cottages, farmhouses and farm buildings, many of which are timber framed. The other listed buildings include churches, items in churchyards, a country house and associated structures, a milepost, a former toll house, a school, almshouses, a hotel, and a rifle target gallery.

== Key ==
Grade	Criteria
I	Buildings of exceptional interest, sometimes considered to be internationally important
II*	Particularly important buildings of more than special interest
II	Buildings of national importance and special interest

== Buildings ==
Name and location	Photograph	Date	Notes	Grade
St Peter's Church; 52.70481°N 2.55703°W		12th century	Alterations and extensions were made later, and there were restorations in the 19th century. The church is in sandstone with tile roofs, and has a cruciform plan, consisting of a nave, north and south transepts, a chancel with north and south chapels, and a tower at the crossing. The tower has large buttresses, a circular stair turret with an ogee cap, lancet windows in the lower stage and Decorated windows in the upper stage, an embattled parapet, and a recessed pyramidal roof.	I
Aston Hall; 52.68350°N 2.57426°W	—	16th or 17th century	The oldest part is the rear wing, which is timber framed and faced in red brick. The main range dates from the 18th century, it is in red brick, and has a string course with moulded modillions, and a tile roof. There are two storeys and an attic, and five bays. On the front is a gabled porch and a doorway with a moulded surround, and the ground floor windows are in segmental arched openings.	II
The Lilacs; 52.70432°N 2.55650°W	—	16th or 17th century	A timber framed cottage that has been refaced in brick and rendered, it was extended in the 18th century. The roof is tiled, there is one storey and an attic, six bays, and a gabled rear wing. The windows are modern casements, there are three gabled dormers, and inside is exposed timber framing.	II
Admaston Farm Farmhouse; 52.71530°N 2.54423°W	—	Early 17th century (probable)	The farmhouse is timber framed with plastered and painted brick infill, a brick gable end, and a tile roof. There is one storey and an attic, a main range, and a gabled cross-wing to the right, which has a jettied attic and a trellis porch. The windows are casements, and there is a gabled dormer.	II
Wrockwardine Hall; 52.70534°N 2.55672°W	—	1628	The hall was extended in the middle of the 18th century when the earlier part was encased in red brick. It has a hipped tile roof, the main block has two storeys and an attic, and fronts of seven and four bays. At the east end is a gabled wing at right angles, and a later single-storey extension in the angle. In the centre of the front is a doorway with fluted Doric pilasters, an entablature, and a segmental pediment. The windows are sashes with moulded surrounds, and there are three hip-roofed dormers. At the rear are two round-arched stair windows and four hip-roofed dormers.	II*
7 Allscott; 52.71336°N 2.57443°W	—	17th century	A timber framed cottage with painted brick infill, part of the ground floor has been faced in red brick, the gable end is partly roughcast, and the roof is tiled. There are two storeys and an attic. Some of the windows are fixed, others are casements, and there is a mullioned and transomed window in the gable end.	II
5 Aston; 52.68661°N 2.57287°W	—	17th century	A timber framed cottage with painted infill and a thatched roof. There is one storey and an attic, two bays, and a lean-to on the northwest end. The windows are casements.	II
29 Charlton; 52.69765°N 2.59716°W	—	17th century	A timber framed cottage with painted infill and a thatched roof. There is one storey and an attic, and one bay. On the front is a gabled porch and a casement window, and on the right end is a large external sandstone chimney stack.	II
Aston Farmhouse; 52.68271°N 2.57550°W	—	17th century	A timber framed farmhouse, it was encased in red brick and extended in the 19th century. It has a tile roof. The original part has two storeys and three bays, to the right is a gabled wing and a gabled cross-wing with two storeys and an attic, and on the left is a wing with one storey and an attic. The windows are casements.	II
Leaton Grange; 52.69865°N 2.57343°W	—	17th century	The house is timber framed and roughcast with a tile roof, and there have been later extensions. It has two storeys and an attic, a main range, a gabled cross-wing at the southwest, in the angle is a two-storey tower with a jettied gable, and there is a 19th-century rear wing with two storeys and a hipped roof. The windows are sashes, in the cross-wing is a splayed bay window, and there are two gabled dormers.	II
Mill House, Cluddley; 52.68951°N 2.54587°W	—	17th century	A timber framed house that was encased in brick in the 19th century, it has a dentilled eaves course and a tile roof. There are two storeys and three bays. On the front is a porch with Tuscan columns and an entablature, and the doorway has a moulded surround. There is a French window, and the other windows are casements with segmental heads.	II
The Old Cottage; 52.70522°N 2.55913°W	—	17th century (probable)	The original part of the cottage, which was later extended, is timber framed and encased in painted brick, with some exposed timber framing in the gable, and a tile roof. There is one storey and an attic, and two bays. The windows are casements, there is a gabled dormer, and to the south is a modern brick wing.	II
Wrockwardine Cottage; 52.70516°N 2.55630°W	—	17th century	The cottage is timber framed with painted brick infill and a tile roof. There is one storey and an attic, and a front of three bays. The doorway has a plain surround, the windows are casements, and there are two gabled dormers. Extending to the south and giving an L-shaped plan is a 19th-century outbuilding in brick with a moulded eaves course, a tile roof, one storey and an attic.	II
Barn and Stables, Mill House; 52.68941°N 2.54606°W	—	Late 17th to early 18th century	The barn is partly timber framed and partly in brick, on a brick plinth, the gable ends are in brick with ventilation holes, and the roof is tiled. There are three bays, and in the middle bay are double cart doors.	II
Sundial; 52.70470°N 2.55711°W		1750	The sundial is in the churchyard of St Peter's Church. It is in bronze, on a cast iron fluted column, and stands on a circular stone base.	II
Churchyard boundary wall 52.70467°N 2.55681°W		18th century	The retaining wall enclosing the churchyard of St Peter's Church is in sandstone with saddleback coping stones. The southeast side is buttressed by ramped brickwork, and the two entrances to the churchyard have wrought iron overthrows.	II
Cluddley Farmhouse; 52.68878°N 2.54599°W	—	18th century	A red brick house with a moulded eaves course, and a tile roof with moulded brick coping and stone kneelers. There are two storeys and attics, three bays, and a rear wing. The middle bay is wider and has a pedimented gable, a segmental-arched window in the attic, and a Venetian window below. The outer bays are gabled and in the attics are windows with tent-shaped arches. The other windows have flat heads, and contain mullioned and transomed casements. The doorways are in the outer bays and have round arches and moulded pediments; the right doorway is blocked.	II*
Stables northwest of Cluddley Farmhouse; 52.68893°N 2.54629°W	—	18th century	The stables are in red brick with some re-used timber framing, and the roof is tiled with coped gables. There are two storeys and three bays. In the ground floor are three stable doors, the upper floor contains a loft door, and there are ventilation holes.	II
Stables southwest of Cluddley Farmhouse; 52.68868°N 2.54633°W	—	18th century	The stables are in red brick with dentilled eaves, a tile roof with brick coped gable ends and stone kneelers, and two storeys. The stables contain a stable door and flanking windows with segmental heads, ventilation holes, a loft door, and pigeon holes and ledges in the gable end.	II
Wall south of Cluddley Farmhouse; 52.68870°N 2.54576°W	—	18th century	The wall enclosing the garden to the south of the farmhouse is in red brick with rounded brick coping, and is between about 4 feet (1.2 m) and 5 feet (1.5 m) high.	II
Mill House, Allscott; 52.71569°N 2.57497°W	—	18th century	A red brick house with a tile roof, two storeys and an attic, and three bays. The central doorway has a plain surround and a rectangular fanlight, and the windows are mullioned and transomed with segmental heads.	II
Orleton Hall; 52.69795°N 2.54215°W		Late 18th century	A country house, possibly with an earlier core, that was refronted in about 1830 by Edward Haycock. It is in stuccoed brick with a cornice, a parapet, and a hipped slate roof. There are three storeys, nine bays, a two-storey three-bay wing at the northeast, and service wings at the rear. The middle three bays of the entrance front have an entablature on unfluted Greek Doric columns. The middle three bays of the garden front project under a pediment with an oculus in the tympanum. The windows are sashes.	II*
Orleton Hall Gatehouse and Bridge; 52.69812°N 2.54164°W	—	Late 16th century	The gatehouse was altered in the 18th century. There are two storeys and an attic, the lower storey is in red brick, the upper parts are timber framed with brick infill, and the roof is tiled. In the centre is a carriageway with a segmental vault, keystones, and an impost. There are gabled dormers containing windows with Gothic Y-tracery, and below are a clock face and an oval window. On the roof is a cupola. Adjoining the gateway and crossing the moat is a stone bridge has two small arched spans.	II
Orleton Hall Dovecote; 52.69845°N 2.54165°W	—	18th century	The dovecote is in red brick with dentilled eaves, and a hipped tile roof with a lantern. It has an octagonal plan, and contains small circular flight holes with keystones.	II
Orleton Hall Gazebo; 52.69800°N 2.53984°W		Mid 18th century	The gazebo is in stuccoed brick, with an octagonal plan, a moulded eaves cornice, and an ogee-shaped slate roof with a finial. Steps lead up to the main floor, there is a service basement below, and the building is surrounded by a lattice balustrade. The porch has a concave canopy, and the windows have keyhole-shaped surrounds and contain sashes.	II*
Orleton Hall Stables; 52.69838°N 2.54206°W	—	18th century	The stable range is in red brick with a tile roof, two storeys and five bays. The building contains flat-arched openings with keystones, and mullioned and transomed casement windows, and above the central doorway is a dated and initialled tablet.	II
Orleton Hall Kitchen Garden Walls; 52.69792°N 2.54065°W	—	18th century	The walls enclose the rectangular kitchen garden to the east of the hall. They are in plain red brick.	II
The Blacksmith's Shop; 52.70554°N 2.55927°W		18th century	A cottage in painted brick with a tile roof. The middle block has two storeys and two bays, a central doorway, mullioned and transomed windows in the ground floor, and casements above. To the left is a lower one-bay extension, and to the right is an extension with one storey, an attic, a casement window, and a gabled dormer. On the extreme left is a single-story blacksmith's workshop.	II
The Old Vicarage; 52.70497°N 2.55823°W	—	18th century	A red brick house that was later extended, it has a moulded dentilled eaves cornice, and a tile roof with parapeted ends. There are two storeys and attics, the original block has three bays, the later taller block to the left also has three bays, and there is a rear wing. On the older block is an openwork cast iron porch with Greek key decoration, and the doorway has a moulded architrave. The ground floor windows have fixed frames, those in the older part with segmental heads. In the upper floor are sash windows, and there are four moulded gabled dormers with casements.	II
Wrockwardine Farmhouse; 52.70509°N 2.55994°W	—	18th century	The farmhouse was later extended. It is in red brick and has a tile roof with a coped gable end. There are two storeys and an attic, the main block has three bays, there is a later projecting wing at the right, and a rear wing. The central doorway has a moulded surround and a pedimented hood on console brackets. In the upper floor of the main block the windows are mullioned and transomed, and elsewhere they are replacements.	II
Garden wall, Wrockwardine Farmhouse; 52.70519°N 2.55968°W	—	18th century	The wall is to the northeast of the farmhouse. It is in red brick with saddleback brick coping, and is between about 5 feet (1.5 m) and 6 feet (1.8 m) high.	II
Barn, stables and cart shed, Wrockwardine Hall; 52.70536°N 2.55619°W	—	18th century	The barn, stables and cart shed form a range in red brick with a tile roof. The barn and stables have doors and ventilation holes, and the cart shed, which is lower, has an open front.	II
Garden wall, Wrockwardine Hall; 52.70595°N 2.55606°W	—	18th century	The wall encloses the garden to the north and the west of the hall. It is a tall wall in red brick with saddleback brick coping.	II
Stables northeast of Wrockwardine Hall; 52.70556°N 2.55643°W	—	18th century	The stable building is in red brick and has a tile roof with parapeted gable ends. There is one storey and a loft, and it contains two stable doors and loft windows. At the gable end external stairs in brick and stone lead up to the left door.	II
Stables east of Wrockwardine Hall; 52.70533°N 2.55640°W	—	18th century	The stable range is in red brick and has a tile roof with parapeted gable ends. There are two storeys and three bays. The windows are casements, there are two stable doors, and the ground floor openings have segmental arches.	II
Dovecote, Wrockwardine Hall; 52.69797°N 2.55627°W	—	18th century	The dovecote is in red brick with a dentilled eaves course, and a hipped tile roof with a timber octagonal cupola. The dovecote has an octagonal plan, there are circular flight openings on alternate sides, and inside are nesting holes with brick ledges.	II
Allscott Mill; 52.71585°N 2.57561°W	—	Late 18th or early 19th century	A former watermill on the River Tern, it is in red brick with a dentilled eaves course and a tile roof. There are two storeys and an attic, three bays, and a lean-to on the southeast end. In the centre of each floor is a doorway that is flanked by two-light windows, all with segmental-arched heads.	II
Barn, Cluddley Farm; 52.68878°N 2.54647°W	—	18th or 19th century	The barn is in red brick, and contains a fragment of timber framing. It has a tile roof with brick coped gable ends and stone kneelers. The barn contains two segmental-headed cart entrances on each side, segmental-arched ground floor windows, external steps to a loft door, and pigeon holes with ledges.	II
Mill near Mill House; 52.68958°N 2.54629°W	—	Late 18th or early 19th century	The oldest part is a former windmill with three storeys, and a segmental arched doorway, but without a roof. Adjoining it is a later stream mill in brick with overhanging eaves and a slate roof. It has two storeys and an attic, and contains small cast iron windows and a round-headed doorway. Adjoining this is a single-storey engine house with round-arched cast iron windows. A one-storey brick range joins the engine house to the windmill.	II
Milepost near Orleton Hall; 52.69248°N 2.54444°W		c. 1815–19	The milepost is on the north side of the B5061 road, It is in cast iron and has splayed sides. The milepost is inscribed with the distances to London, Shifnal, and "SALOP (Shrewsbury).	II
Bratton Farmhouse; 52.72344°N 2.53790°W	—	Early 19th century	The farmhouse is in red brick with a rendered front and a hipped slate roof. There are two storeys and three bays. The central doorway has pilasters, a rectangular fanlight, and an entablature, and the windows are sashes.	II
Burcot Manor; 52.69504°N 2.55968°W	—	Early 19th century	A red brick house that has a slate roof with pedimented gable ends. There are two storeys, five bays, and a rear wing. Steps lead to the central doorway that has attached Ionic columns, an entablature, a moulded architrave, and a rectangular fanlight. The windows are sashes with segmental openings.	II
Church Farmhouse; 52.70429°N 2.55737°W	—	Early 19th century	A red brick house with corner pilasters, deep overhanging eaves, and a tile roof. There are two storeys, three bays, and a wing on the left. In the centre is a lean-to porch with side lights, and the other windows are sliding sashes with segmental heads.	II
Barn and stable range, Church Farm; 52.70413°N 2.55799°W	—	Early 19th century	A long range consisting of a barn and stables in red brick with a tile roof. The barn contains a central segmental-arched cart entrance and ventilation holes, and the stable has segmental-arched windows and a loft door. External stairs in brick and stone lead up to the loft door.	II
Donnerville Hall; 52.70798°N 2.53615°W	—	Early 19th century	A stuccoed brick house with a string course, oversailing eaves, and a hipped slate roof. There are three storeys, three bays, and a later two-storey two-bay wing to the left. In the centre is a porch with pilasters and a hipped roof, and this is flanked by French windows. The upper floors contain sash windows, those in the middle floor with cast iron balconies.	II
Long Lane Farmhouse; 52.73446°N 2.53878°W	—	Early 19th century	The farmhouse is in red brick with a dentilled eaves course and a tile roof. There are three storeys, three bays, and flanking two-storey one-bay wings. The windows in the main part are casements with cambered heads. Each wing has an arched recess and a string course, in the right wing are sash windows, and the left wing contains a lunette window.	II
Manor Farmhouse; 52.71389°N 2.57279°W	—	Early 19th century	A red brick farmhouse with a tile roof, it has two storeys and an attic, three bays, and rear gabled wings. In the centre is a doorway with pilasters, a rectangular fanlight, and an entablature, and the windows are casements in segmental-headed openings.	II
The Dingle; 52.70509°N 2.56142°W	—	Early 19th century	A red brick house with a dentilled eaves course and a slate roof. There are three storeys, three bays, and a two-storey, one-bay left wing. In the centre is a porch and a doorway with pilasters, a semicircular traceried fanlight, and a broken pediment. The ground floor contains a square bay window with pilasters and an entablature, and a canted bay window with pilasters and a cornice, and in the upper floor are sash windows.	II
Garden walls, The Old Vicarage; 52.70492°N 2.55792°W	—	Early 19th century	The walls are to the northwest and southeast of the house. They are in red brick with half-round brick coping. The walls are between 7 feet (2.1 m) and 10 feet (3.0 m) high, and there are square piers at the ends.	II
The Round House or The Umbrella House; 52.69207°N 2.56550°W		1835	The former toll house is in stone with overhanging eaves and a hipped slate roof. There is one storey, and a front of five bays, the middle three forming a canted bay. The windows are mullioned in plain architraves, and the doorway on the right side of the canted bay has a moulded architrave and ornate wrought ironwork.	II
Former Post Office; 52.70395°N 2.55663°W	—	1837	A school and schoolmaster's house in red brick, later used for other purposes. The school has a moulded stone eaves cornice, a slate roof with moulded stone-coped gable ends, and one storey. To the right is a projecting stone gabled porch with a finial and a datestone in the form of a shield. The windows are modern replacements. The house to the left has a tile roof, two storeys, an L-shaped plan, a gabled porch with a Tudor arch, and casement windows with stone surrounds and diamond glazing.	II
Admaston Spa; 52.71391°N 2.53841°W		c. 1840	A house consisting of a main block and a left wing. The main block is stuccoed with a string course and a hipped slate roof. There are two storeys and five bays. The centre three bays are recessed and contain a portico with Doric columns and an entablature, and the windows are sashes. The left wing is in brick with two storeys and three bays, and it contains a central square bay window. Adjoining to the left is a carriageway with an elliptical arch, above which is a clock with a hipped roof, a bellcote and a weathervane. In the garden are wrought iron railings.	II
Well Head, Admaston Spa; 52.71388°N 2.53813°W	—	c. 1840	The well head for the mineral spring is in stone. It is octagonal, with panelled sides and a circular internal bowl.	II
14 Wrockkwardine; 52.70457°N 2.55627°W	—	1841	A cottage orné in yellow brick with wide eaves and a tile roof. There are two storeys, two gabled bays with ornate openwork bargeboards, and a rear wing. The windows are small-pane casements, and the porch in the rear wing is gabled with openwork bargeboards.	II
Cludde Almshouses; 52.70293°N 2.55602°W		1841	The almshouses, designed by Edward Haycock in Tudor style, are built in yellow brick with stone dressings, and have a tile roof with coped gables and kneelers. There are two storeys and three bays, each bay being gabled with a finial, the middle gable being larger and containing an inscribed plaque. The central doorway has a pointed head, and the windows have lights with Gothic pointed heads. Above the doorway and the ground floor windows are hood moulds that continue as a string course.	II
The Grove Hotel; 52.70334°N 2.60287°W		Mid 19th century	Originally a railway hotel, it is in red brick with a tile roof. There are two storeys and an attic and three bays. The outer bays and the sides are gabled with ornate openwork bargeboards. In the centre is an open porch, and the outer bays contain two-storey splayed bay windows with small panes and moulded cornices.	II
School and School Master's House; 52.70462°N 2.55656°W	—	1853	The building is in buff brick with stone dressings, corbelled eaves, and a tile roof with moulded stone coping, kneelers and finials. There is one storey and attics, and an L-shaped plan. The school has a Tudor arched doorway, windows with chamfered surrounds, and a gabled dormer. The house has two bays, a Tudor arched porch, and casement windows.	II
Wrekin Rifle Range Target Gallery; 52.67701°N 2.54795°W	—	c. 1902	The walls of the target gallery are in brick with glazed capping bricks. The supports and target frames are in iron. The rifle range, and the land on which the target gallery stands, are a scheduled monument.	II
