= Upton Magna =

Village in Shropshire, England

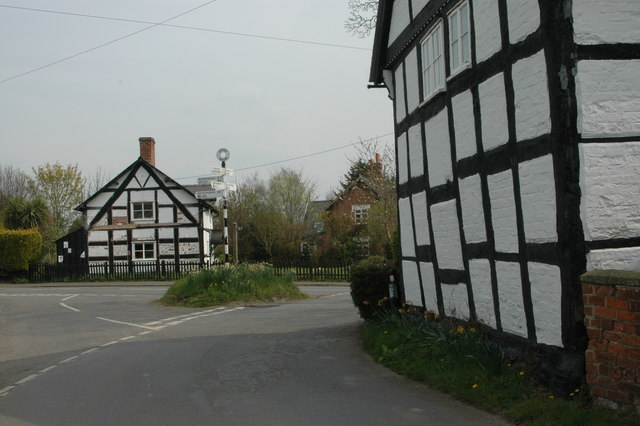
- Upton Magna junction

- Location within Shropshire
- Population: 321 (2011)
- OS grid reference: SJ554125
- Civil parish: Upton Magna
- Unitary authority: Shropshire
- Ceremonial county: Shropshire
- Region: West Midlands
- Country: England
- Sovereign state: United Kingdom
- Post town: Shrewsbury
- Postcode district: SY4
- Dialling code: 01743
- Police: West Mercia
- Fire: Shropshire
- Ambulance: West Midlands
- UK Parliament: Shrewsbury and Atcham

Upton Magna is a village and civil parish in Shropshire, England. (Magna is Latin, meaning "great". Therefore, the translation of Upton Magna is "Great Upton".) Nearby are the villages of Uffington, Rodington and Withington, as well as the wooded Haughmond Hill. The nearest town to Upton Magna is Shrewsbury, just 2.4 miles (3.9 km) to the west. In 2011 the parish had a population of 321.

Upton Magna is situated on the National Cycle Route 81 between Wellington and Shrewsbury.

== Buildings ==
Upton Magna is notable for containing the oldest still-standing cottage in Europe – Cruck Cottage, a thatch-roofed, timber-framed cottage located near the church. The entry for this Grade II listed building on the Historic England website suggests that it dates from the 15th or 16th century. However, although the building appears to have been remodelled in the 15th century, dendrochronological tests on the crucks in the cottage have dated the timber to 1269.

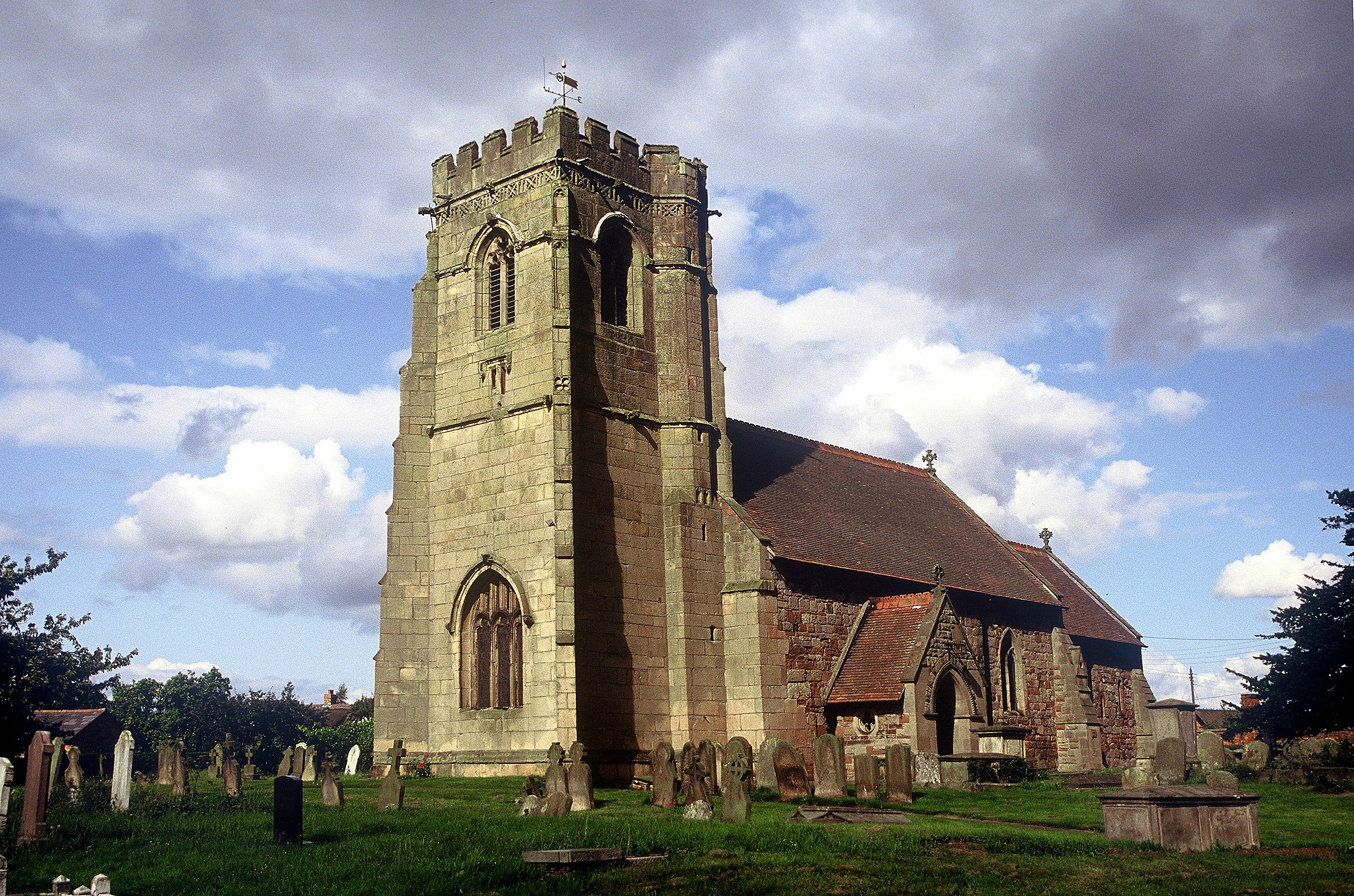
The church of St Lucia is a Grade II* listed building.

Key features of the village include a primary school, a Church of England parish church (dedicated to St Lucia), a village hall, a pub ("The Haughmond", formerly "The Corbet Arms"), and a small business park.

== Upton Forge ==
Near the village is the site of Upton Forge. (The location is grid reference SJ560113; 52°41′53″N 2°39′7″W.) The forge was in operation by 1675, and during the 18th century it was one of the largest forges in the country, with an output of 200 tons per year. It was leased by William Hazledine from 1800, and further developed; the works extended over about 2 miles (3.2 km) of the valley. The chains of the Menai Suspension Bridge and the Conwy Suspension Bridge were made here. The works closed after Hazledine's death in 1840.

== Notable people ==
- Samuel Fisher (died 1681), puritan clergyman and writer, was Rector of Upton Magna 1635-42
- Upton Magna is identifiably the "Upton-under-Amon near Shrewsbury" where John Plimmer (1812–1905) was reportedly born, "Amon" being Haughmond Hill. Educated at the village school, he later emigrated to New Zealand, where he became known as "the father of Wellington". He was registered as having been baptised, with the parental names given as Isaac and Mary, on 19 July 1812 at the parish church.
- Civil engineer Sir Henry Maybury (1864-1943) was educated at Upton Magna village school.
- Russian-born novelist, biographer and children's writer, E. M. Almedingen (1898-1971) lived at house Frogmore on the road to Atcham lifelong after World War II.
- Sir Derrick Capper (1912–1977), ultimately Chief Constable West Midlands Police, was son of a farmer at Downton, Upton Magna.
- Marjorie Chibnall (1915-2012), historian, medieavalist and Latin translator, was baptised at the parish church in 1915.

== See also ==
- Listed buildings in Upton Magna
