= Rann Kennedy =

English schoolteacher, church minister and poet

Rann Kennedy (1772 – 2 January 1851) was an English schoolteacher, church minister and poet, acquainted with many notable literary people of the day.

== Life ==
Kennedy was baptised on 28 August 1772 at St Philip's Church, Birmingham. His father Benjamin Kennedy was of Scottish origin, being descended from a branch of the Ayrshire Kennedys, which settled at Shenstone, Staffordshire, early in the eighteenth century. His mother Damaris was the daughter of Illedge Maddox, from a Welsh family. Benjamin Kennedy was a surgeon; he went about 1773 to America to introduce the then fashionable remedy of inoculation, and settled at Annapolis, Maryland with his family. On his death in 1784, Rann returned with his mother to her family's home in Withington, near Shrewsbury, and was brought up there.

In 1791 he went to St John's College, Cambridge, and there he formed a lasting friendship with Samuel Taylor Coleridge. After obtaining his degree (B.A. 1795 and M.A. 1798) he took holy orders, and accepted a mastership in King Edward's School, Birmingham, becoming second master in 1807. From 1797 to 1817 he was also curate of St Paul's Church, Birmingham, and from 1817 until about 1847 was the incumbent, his congregation having purchased for him the next presentation. He gave up his school work about 1836 on inheriting from his cousin, John Kennedy, a small property called the Fox Hollies, near Birmingham, where he lived until his death. John Johnstone and Samuel Parr were important friends. He died at his son Charles's house in St Paul's Square, Birmingham, on 2 January 1851.

== Family ==
In 1802 he married Julia, daughter of the engraver John Hall, and Mary de Gilles, a French Huguenot. His wife's brother, George William Hall, was master of Pembroke College, Oxford and canon of Gloucester. Their sons were Benjamin Hall Kennedy and Charles Rann Kennedy; a third son, George John (died 1847), was master at Rugby School; the fourth son, William James Kennedy (1814–1891), educated at King Edward's School, Birmingham and St John's College, Cambridge (B.A. 1837), was ordained in 1838, became first secretary of the National Society for the Promotion of Education, was from 1848 to 1878 H.M. inspector of schools, and was vicar of Barnwood, Gloucestershire, from 1878 until his death. The sons had very distinguished careers at Cambridge; all won the Porson Prize, and the three elder were senior classics (1827, 1831, 1834).

== Assessment ==
His biographer Thomas Ethelbert Page wrote: "Kennedy was earnest and enthusiastic, and a determined enemy of intolerance and bigotry. His literary attainments were high, his knowledge of the English poets singularly wide, and he came into personal relations with many eminent men of letters, including, besides Coleridge and Washington Irving, William Wordsworth, James Montgomery, Henry Francis Cary, Charles Kemble and Sarah Siddons.

"His own lyric poem entitled The Reign of Youth exhibits rare qualities of imagination and expression. A poem which he published in 1817 on the death of the Princess Charlotte received the highest praise from Washington Irving, who quotes from it in his Sketch-Book."

== Works ==
Kennedy published:

1. A Poem on the Death of the Princess Charlotte of Wales, 1817.
2. A Church of England Psalm-Book, or portions of the Psalter adapted … to the Services of the Established Church, 1821.
3. Thoughts on the Music and Words of Psalmody as at present in use among the Members of the Church of England, 1821; 2nd edition, 1822; 6th edition, 1827.
4. A Tribute in Verse to the Character of George Canning, 1827.
5. Britain's Genius: a Mask, on occasion of the Marriage of Victoria, Queen of Great Britain.
6. The Reign of Youth, a Lyrical Poem,1840.

He also contributed notes to the Italian edition of Byron's poems published in 1842, and assisted his son Charles Rann Kennedy in the translation of Virgil, published in 1849, he undertaking the first four Eclogues, the Georgics, and the first four books of the Aeneid. Some pieces by him will be found in the volume of poems issued by Charles Rann Kennedy in 1857. "The Reign of Youth", with a rendering into pindarics by Richard Claverhouse Jebb, the verses on Princess Charlotte, an address to Edmund Kean, and an unfinished poem, "Haughmond Hill", in the style of Goldsmith's The Deserted Village, were published by Benjamin Hall Kennedy in his Between Whiles; 2nd edition, 1882.
