= Wrockwardine =

Coordinates: 52.703°N 2.556°W

- Village and civil parish
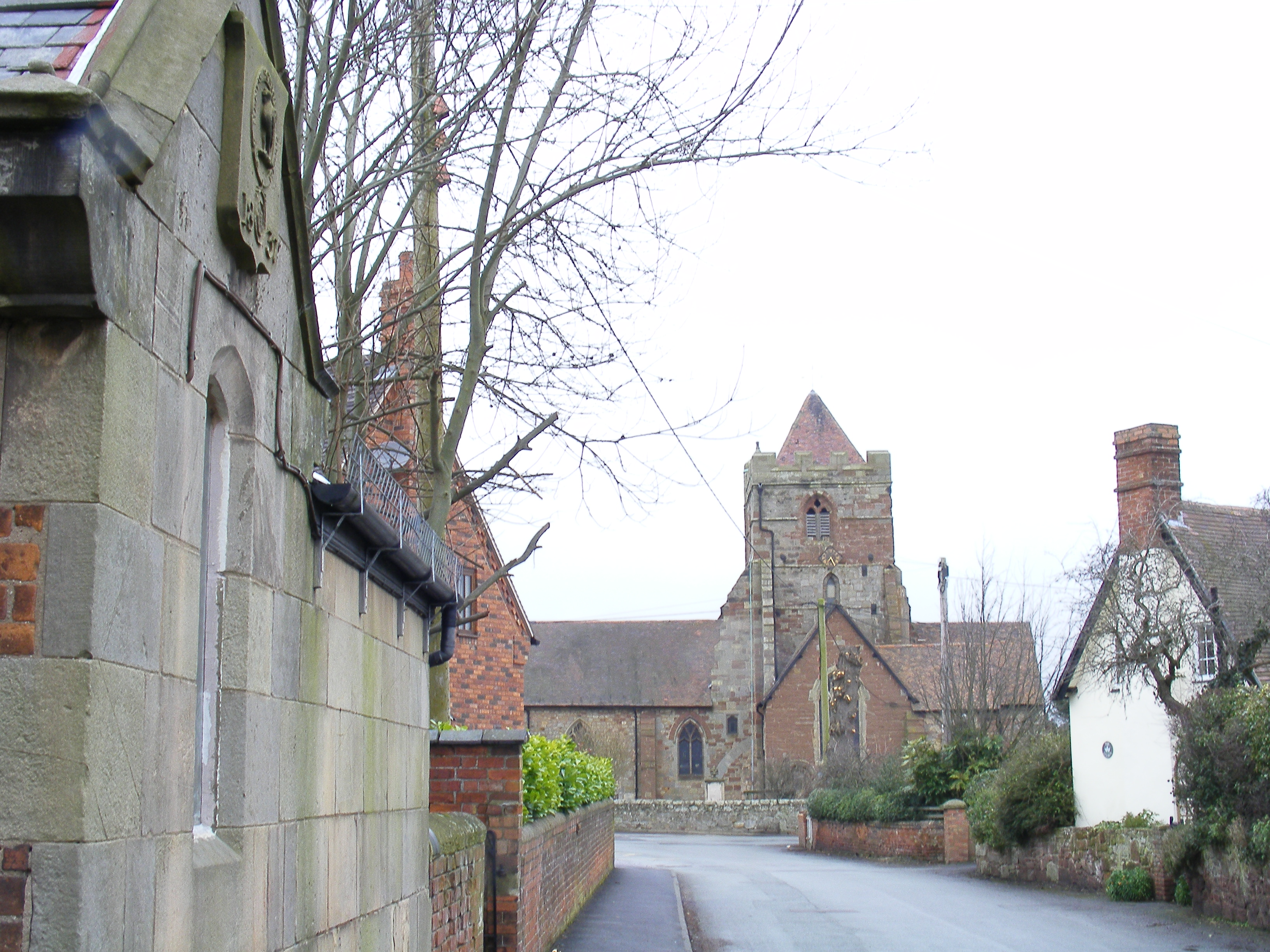
- Wrockwardine village, view from by the Old School House

- Location within Shropshire
- Population: 3,838 (2011)
- OS grid reference: SJ624118
- Civil parish: Wrockwardine
- Unitary authority: Telford and Wrekin
- Ceremonial county: Shropshire
- Region: West Midlands
- Country: England
- Sovereign state: United Kingdom
- Post town: TELFORD
- Postcode district: TF5, TF6
- Dialling code: 01952
- Police: West Mercia
- Fire: Shropshire
- Ambulance: West Midlands
- UK Parliament: The Wrekin

Wrockwardine (/rɒkwɔːrdaɪn/ ROCK-war-dyne) is a village and civil parish in the borough of Telford and Wrekin and ceremonial county of Shropshire, England. The village lies north of The Wrekin and the M54/A5, and west of Wellington. In 2011 the parish had a population of 3838.

The origins of St Peter's Church of England parish church may go back to Saxon times, though the current building dates from the Norman period.

== History ==
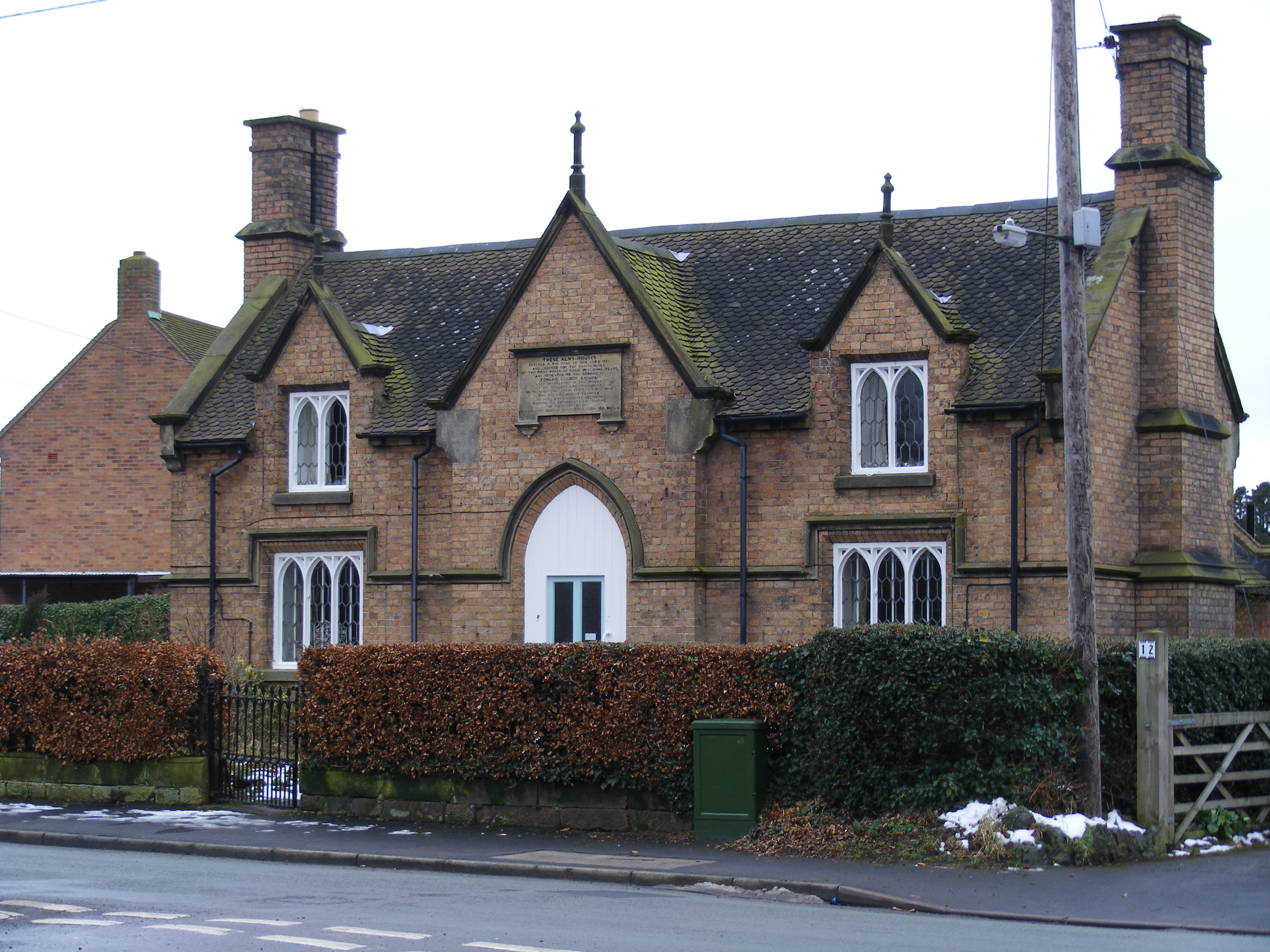
The Alms-Houses, Wrockwardine.

The place-name 'Wrockwardine' is first attested in the Domesday Book of 1086, where it appears as Recordine, which was also the name of one of the Hundreds of Shropshire. It appears as Wroch Wurthin in 1169, and Wrocwurthin in 1196. The name means 'homestead by the Wrekin'.

The earliest surviving court rolls for Wrockwardine Manor are from 1397–8 and continuous court records exist from 1797 to 1936. A workhouse for the poor was built in 1801, which by 1813 had 13 beds within 5 bedrooms. Most of the poor resided in the industrialised, detached part of the parish named Wrockwardine Wood. Wrockwardine was part of the Wellington poor law union from 1836 until 1930.

== The Village today ==
Most of the village lies within a designated conservation area. St Peter's Church is the main central feature but there are a number of other buildings of historical interest. Wrockwardine Hall stands by the church, on the north side. From the south are the Alms-Houses, and the Old School House, both now private houses. There is a more modern village school opposite the church, used until 2014 as a private nursery but has also been converted into private houses.

On a small green to the north is an unusual war memorial, unveiled in 2006, consisting of a large boulder from the nearby Leaton Quarry, listing the village's dead from both World Wars.

The Alms-Houses were built in 1841 by tenants and neighbours of Edward Cludde of Orleton Hall, "in testimony of their respect for a man who was an eminent example of pure and undefiled religion, visiting the fatherless and widows in their affliction, and keeping himself unspotted from the world." A cedar tree was planted in 2011, to commemorate the 170th anniversary of the building.

== Armorial Bearings ==
Wrockwardine Parish Council adopted (assumed) armorial bearings at its meeting of 12 December 2018 (Minute 18/104) Blazon: Armorial bearings. Vert, issuing from base a Saxon Church Or, and in chief two Fountains thereon a helmet with mantling Vert doubled Or and on a Wreath of the Liveries is set for Crest Issuing from a Mural Coronet an Owl Or perched upon a Gate Sable and in an Escrol below the achievement this Motto "Servimus Ultro".

== St Peter's Church ==
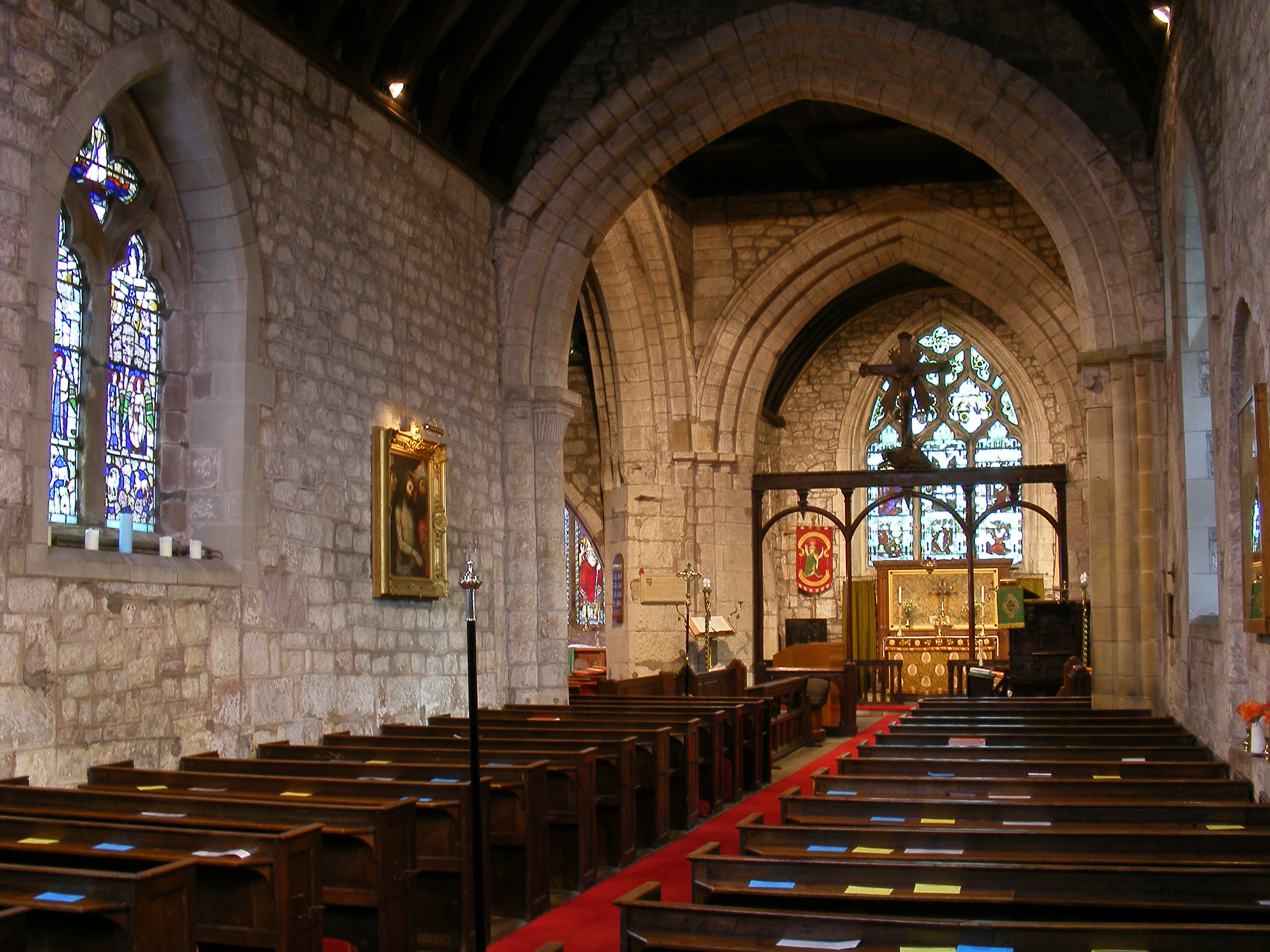
Interior view of St Peter's Church, Wrockwardine.

The church is believed to be of Saxon origin, being mentioned in the Domesday Book of 1086, but the current building is of Norman origin with later modifications. It is of unusual plan in having a cruciform layout, with the tower at the cross-point rather than at the east or west end of the building. This dates from the 12th century, but the addition of The Cludde Chapel on the north transept at the end of the 14th century modifies this shape.

The building shows various evidences of its thousand-year history, beginning with the Norman features. These include a walled-up doorway suggestive of plans for future expansion. An original Norman window in the Chancel was restored in the 19th century with stained glass depicting Holman Hunt's painting of Christ as The Light of the World. The church has several very fine stained glass windows. Some, like the one portraying St Peter, are miniatures at high level. Two windows are war memorials: one, at the east end of the south wall, portraying Joan of Arc and St Margaret of Scotland, is inscribed to the memory of Edith Mary Leake who died "in the service of her country" in July 1918 during World War I, the other, in the north wall of plain glass with inserted coloured fragments and uninscribed, is dedicated to the memory of Lieutenant-Colonel Oldham, 4th Gurkha Rifles killed in action in Burma in World War II, who also has an inscribed stone plaque on the left side of the chancel arch.

A brass plaque commemorates men "associated with the parish" who served during the First World War, including four who died, one of whom, Midshipman David Frank Davies, Royal Navy, has his own stone memorial plaque on the south wall.

A kitchen and disabled toilet has been built. Because of the Listed Building status, there were severe restrictions as to how this could be built. It was constructed in one corner, but no alteration to the existing walls was allowed, including for ventilation. This was covered by means of an ionisation air purifier. This method is widely used in Europe, but this is believed to be the first such use in Britain.

In 2015, a scheme of restoration and reordering was proposed. This will include repairs to stonework and roofs, upgrading of the heating system and the building of new community and meeting rooms. Work should begin in 2016. Funding will come from English Heritage and local fundraising.

The church is equipped with an audio induction loop system installed as part of a customised sound system.

== Transport ==
Wrockwardine is located between the B4394 and B5061 roads, and north of junction 7 of the M54 motorway/A5 dual carriageway. Wellington is located directly to the east, whilst Admaston is to the north.

== Civil parish ==
=== Settlements ===
In addition to the village of Wrockwardine, the eponymous civil parish includes the villages and suburban areas of Admaston and Bratton, the villages of Allscott and Walcot, and the hamlets of Aston, Charlton, Cluddley, Leaton, Overley and Rushmoor.

At Charlton is a Grade II listed cottage and the site of a medieval moated manor house and fishpond.

At Leaton, Breedon Group quarries, crushes and processes greywacke primarily for road construction. The quarry has been worked since the 1960s and occupied an area of 57 hectares prior to an extension granted in 2022. Leaton Grange is a Grade II listed timber-framed house. The listing dates the house from the 17th century, although there is evidence of earlier construction in the form of a solar (upper chamber) cross-wing with an unusual hip end crown-post roof, that was originally part of a rebuilt medieval hall. In 1890, the British Women's Emigration Association founded a Colonial Training Home at the Grange, where women of mostly middle-class, genteel background were trained for domestic service abroad. The women emigrated chiefly to British Colombia and South Africa. The success of the training home led to the setting up of similar institutions throughout the country. In 1907, the establishment relocated to larger premises at Stoke Prior in Worcestershire.

=== Geography ===
Wrockwardine civil parish borders the parishes of Rodington, Wellington, Little Wenlock, Eyton upon the Weald Moors and Waters Upton in Telford and Wrekin, and the Shropshire district parishes of Wroxeter and Uppington and Withington.

=== History ===
In the early 15th century, the townships of Burcot and Nash are noted within Wrockwardine Manor. A gazetteer of 1824 places Wrockwardine parish in the Wellington division of the hundred of Bradford South and includes under Wrockwardine parish the townships of Admaston, Allscot, Bratton, Burcot, Charlton (or Chorlton), Clotley, Leaton and Wrockwardine Wood. Aston and Walcot are shown within the parish of Wellington. An 1871 publication includes within Wrockwardine parish the townships of Long Lane with the hamlet of Rushmoor and Cluddley, but not Clotley. Wrockwardine Wood, formerly a detached part of Wrockwardine parish five miles to the east, became a separate civil parish in 1884. Wrockwardine parish was part of Wellington Rural District from that district's formation in 1894 to its abolition in 1974.

=== Geology ===
The land from Wrockwardine village through Leaton to Overley Hill has a bedrock of volcanic lava Uriconian rocks, which with The Wrekin forms the northern extremity of the Church Stretton Fault. At Overley Hill, in a cutting made for the A5 road, is an exposure of pink rhyolites with grey tuffs, showing flow banding.

== Scenes of Wrockwardine ==
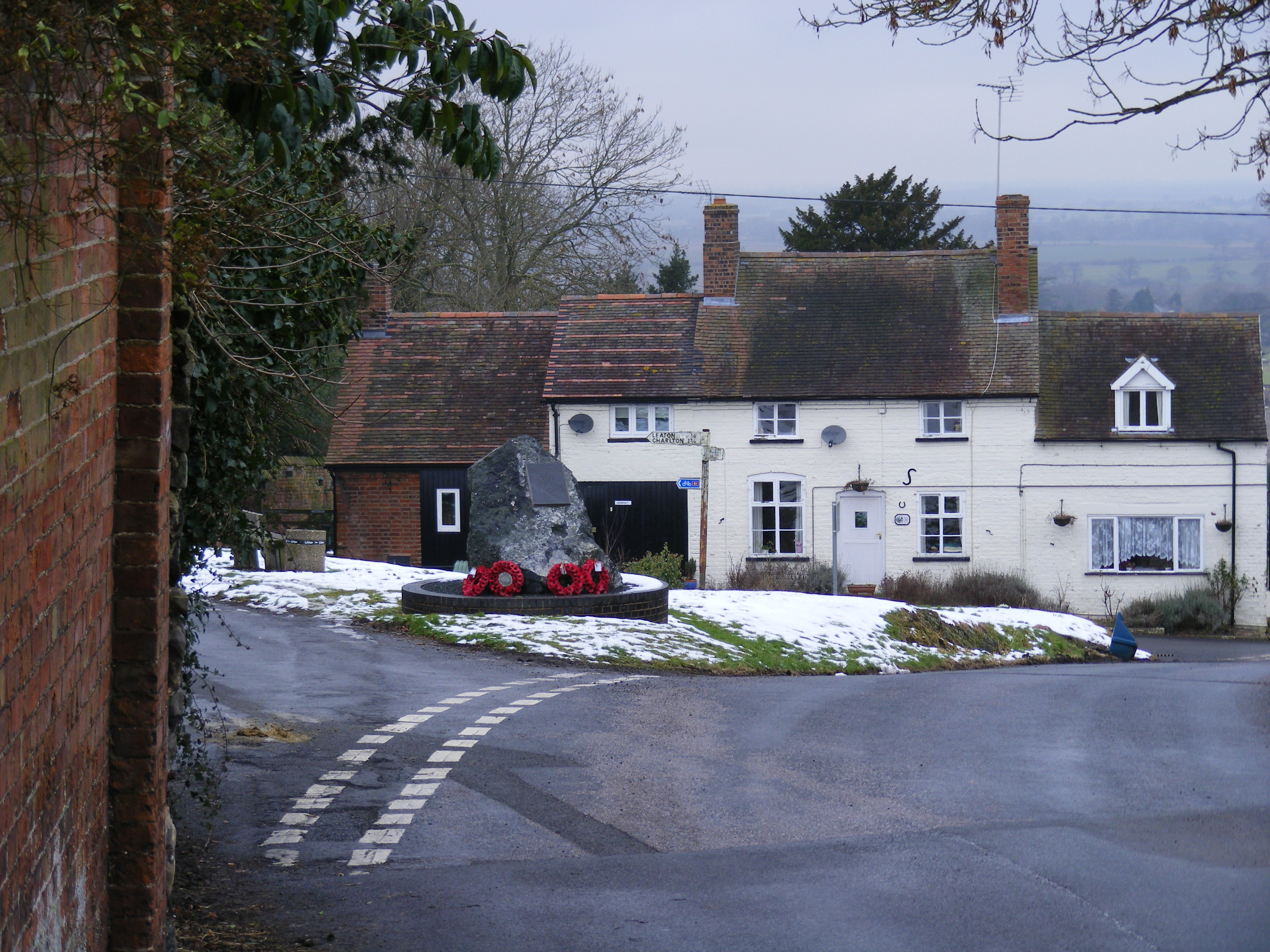
Location of the War Memorial, with former blacksmith's house on far side of the green.

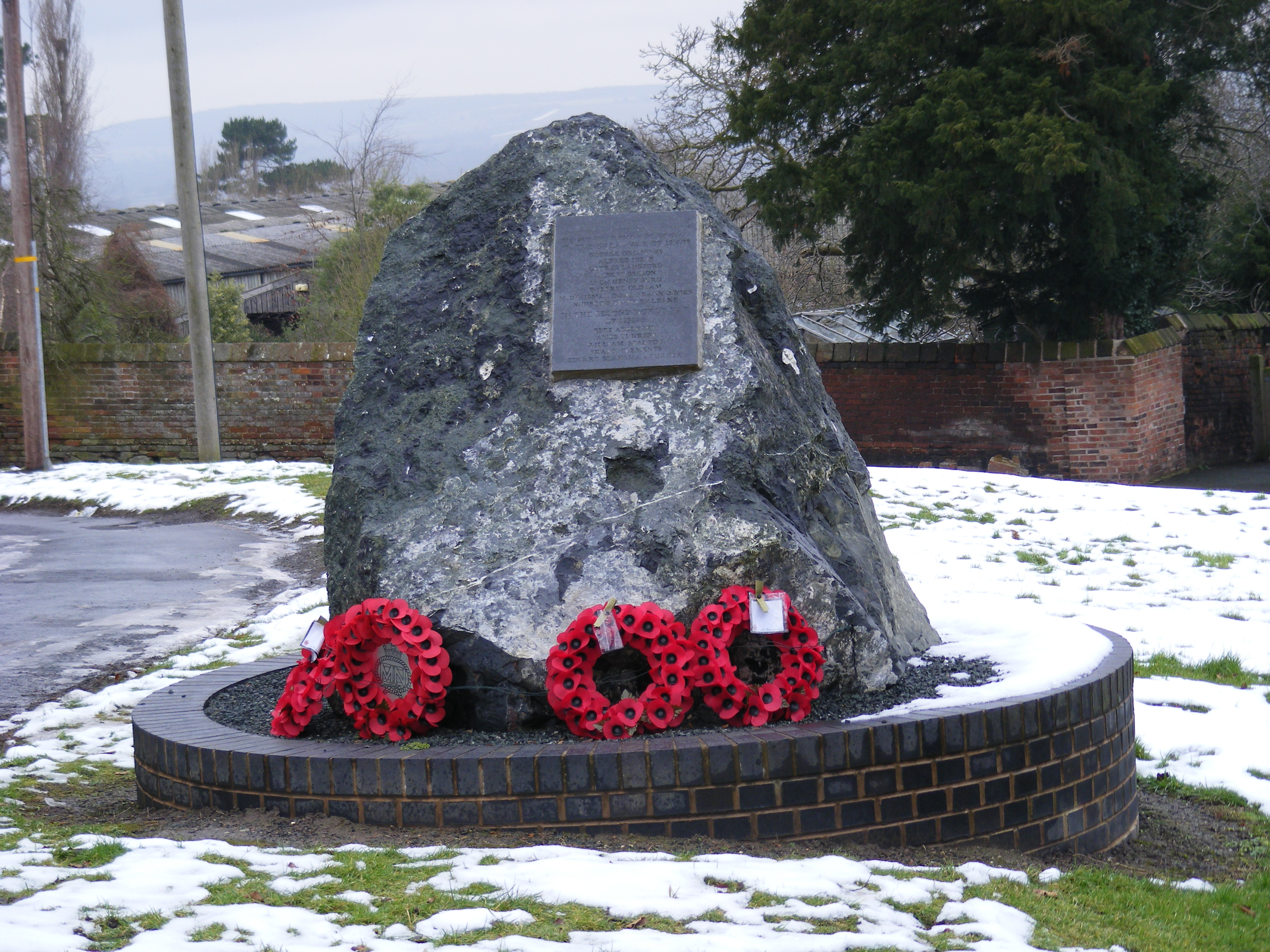
Wrockwardine War Memorial.

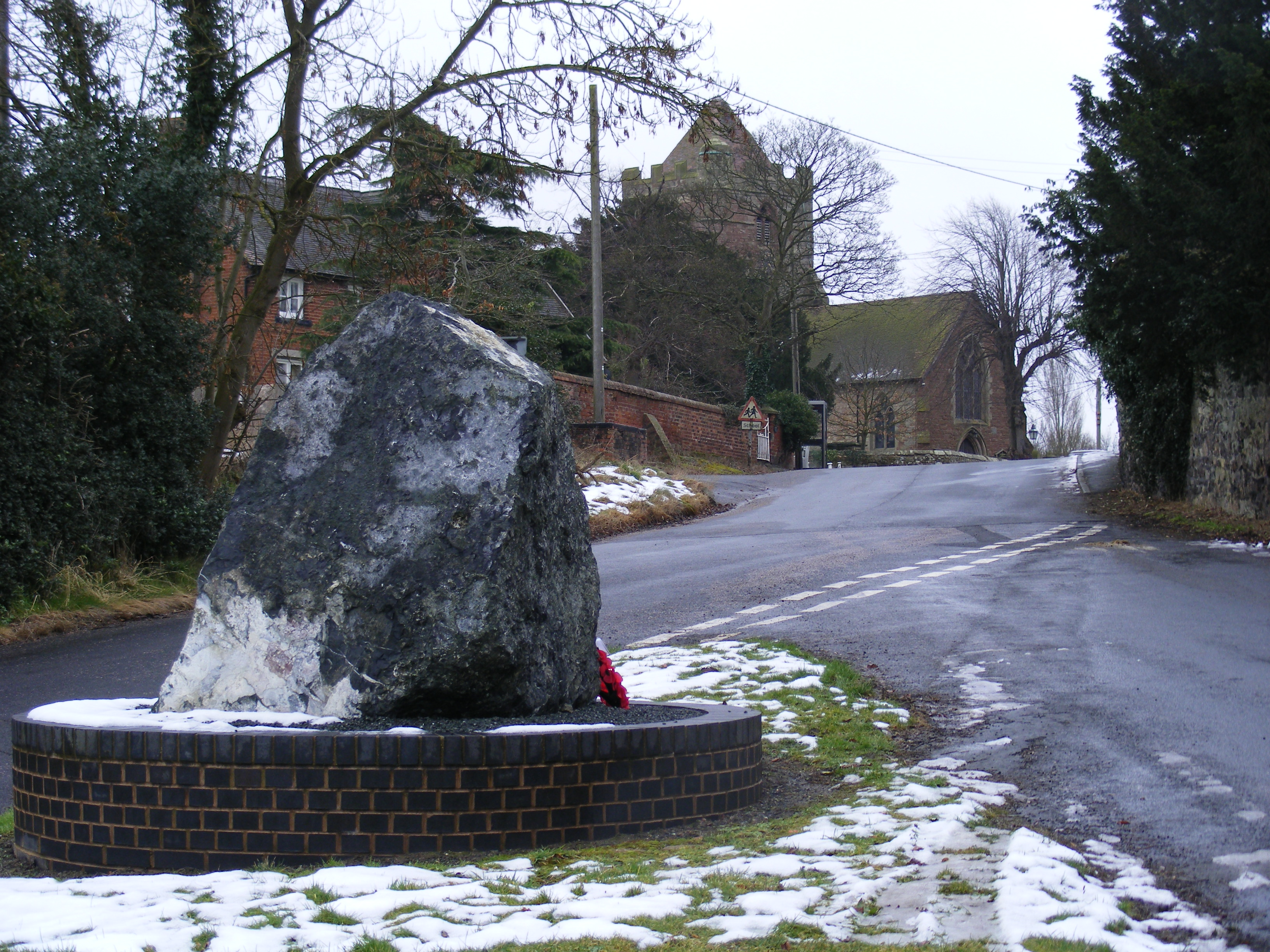
View from War memorial towards the church.

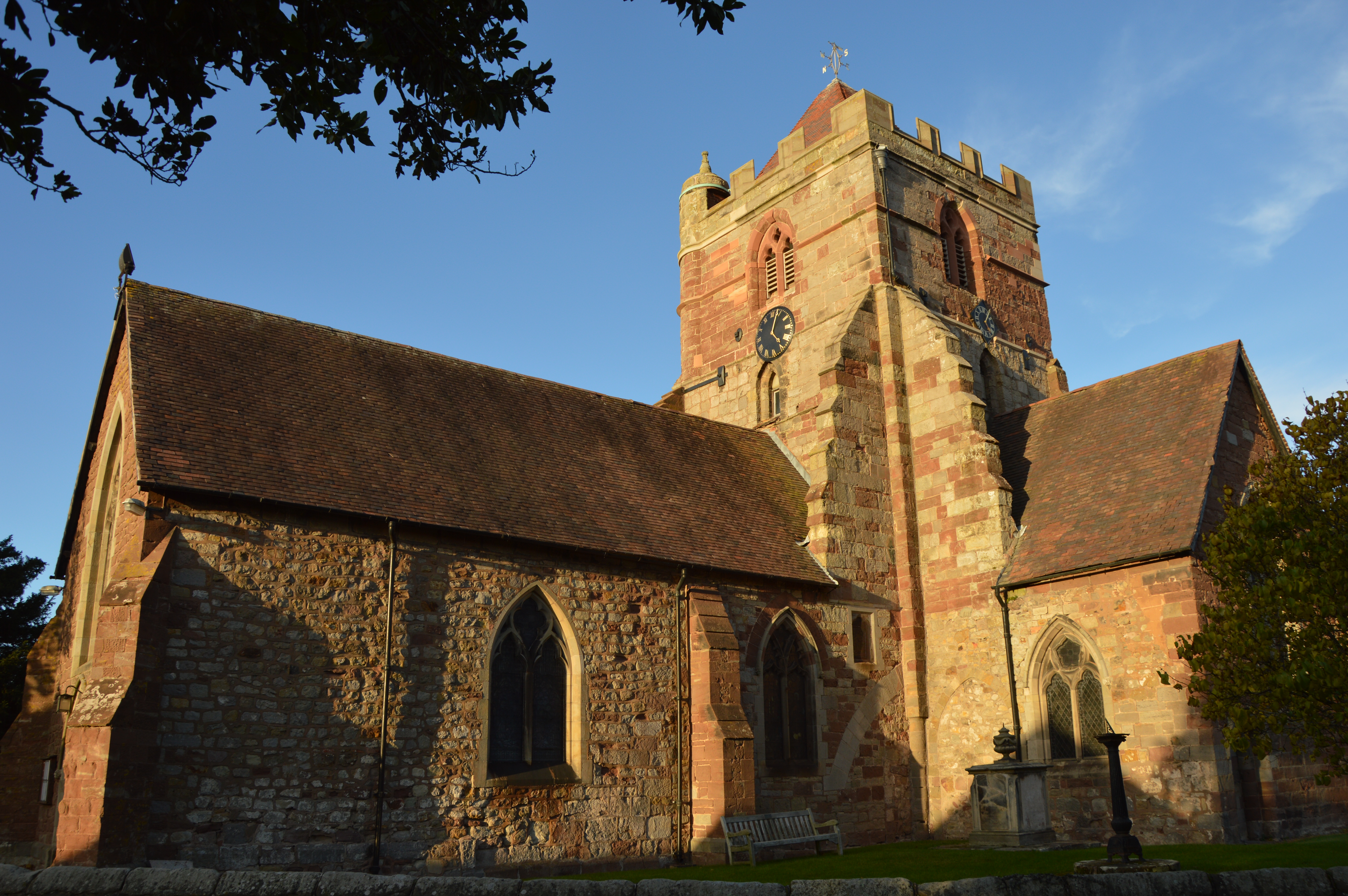
St Peter's Church in Wrockwardine, South West Aspect.

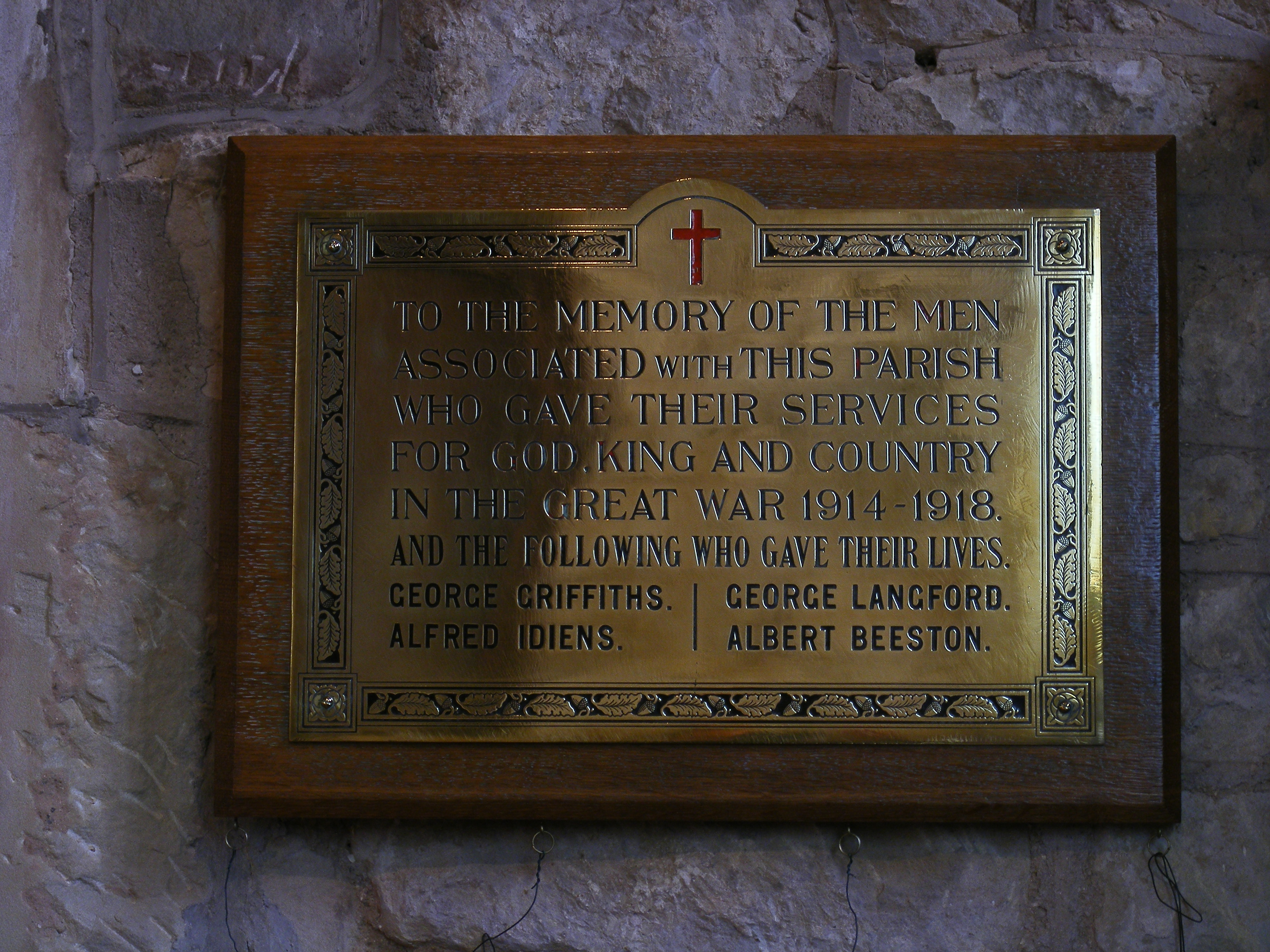
War Memorial plaque in St Peter's Church.

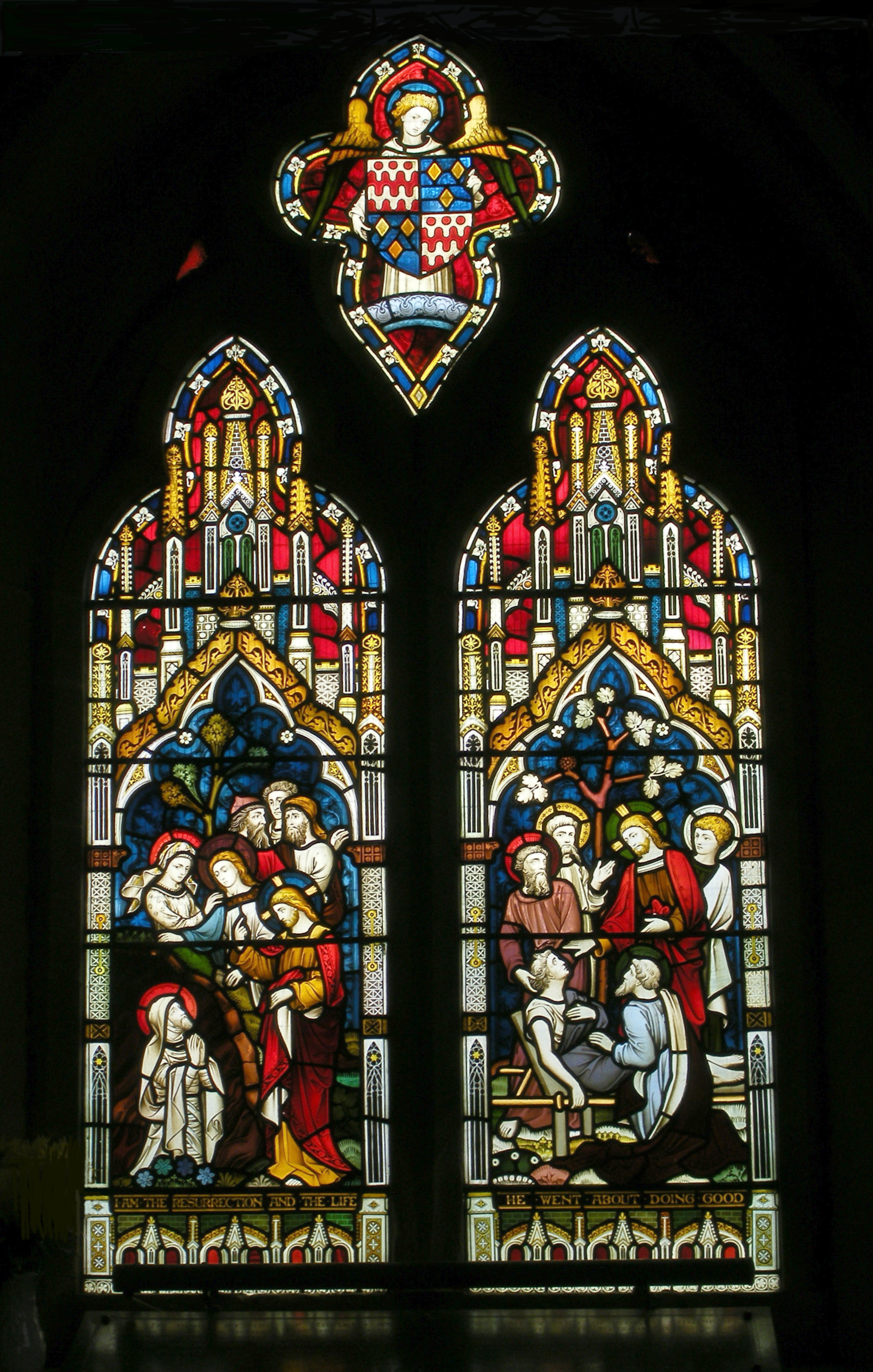
Window in St Peter's Church.

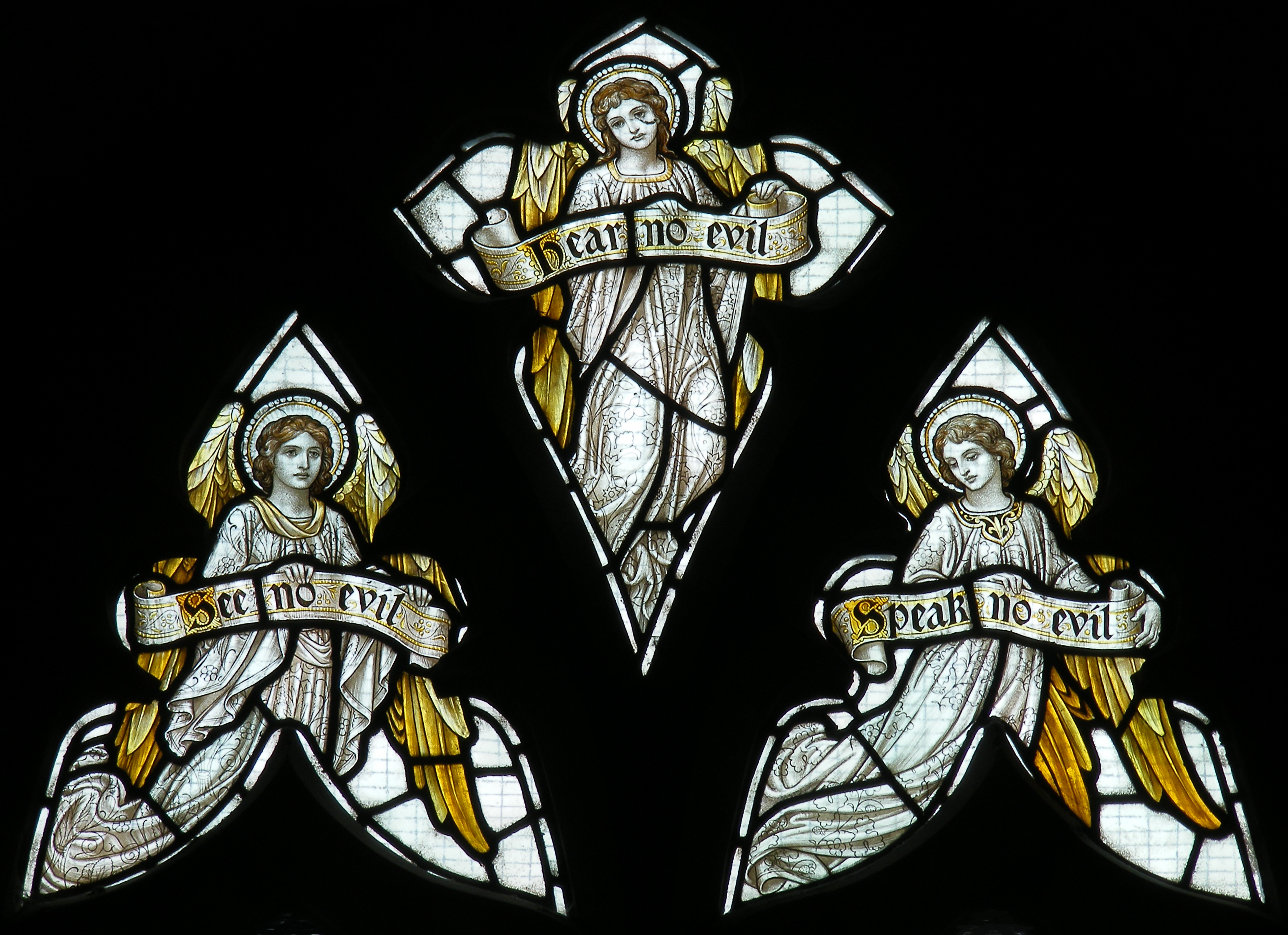
"Three Wise Angels". Detail of a window in St Peter's Church.

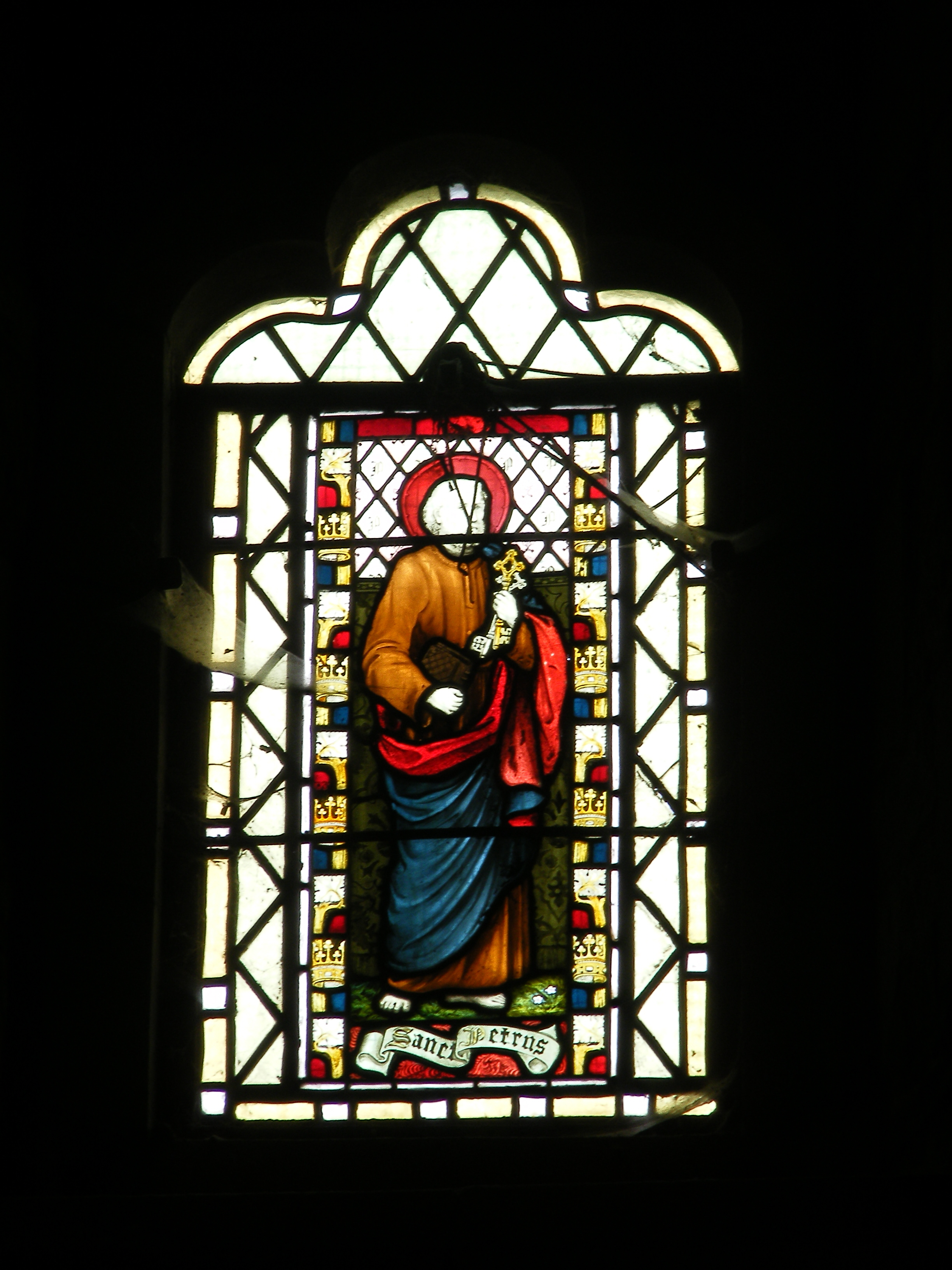
The St Peter window in St Peter's Church.

== See also ==
- Nash - "lost" village near Wrockwardine
