= Walcot, Shropshire =

Village in Shropshire, England

Coordinates: 52.703°N 2.602°W

Walcot
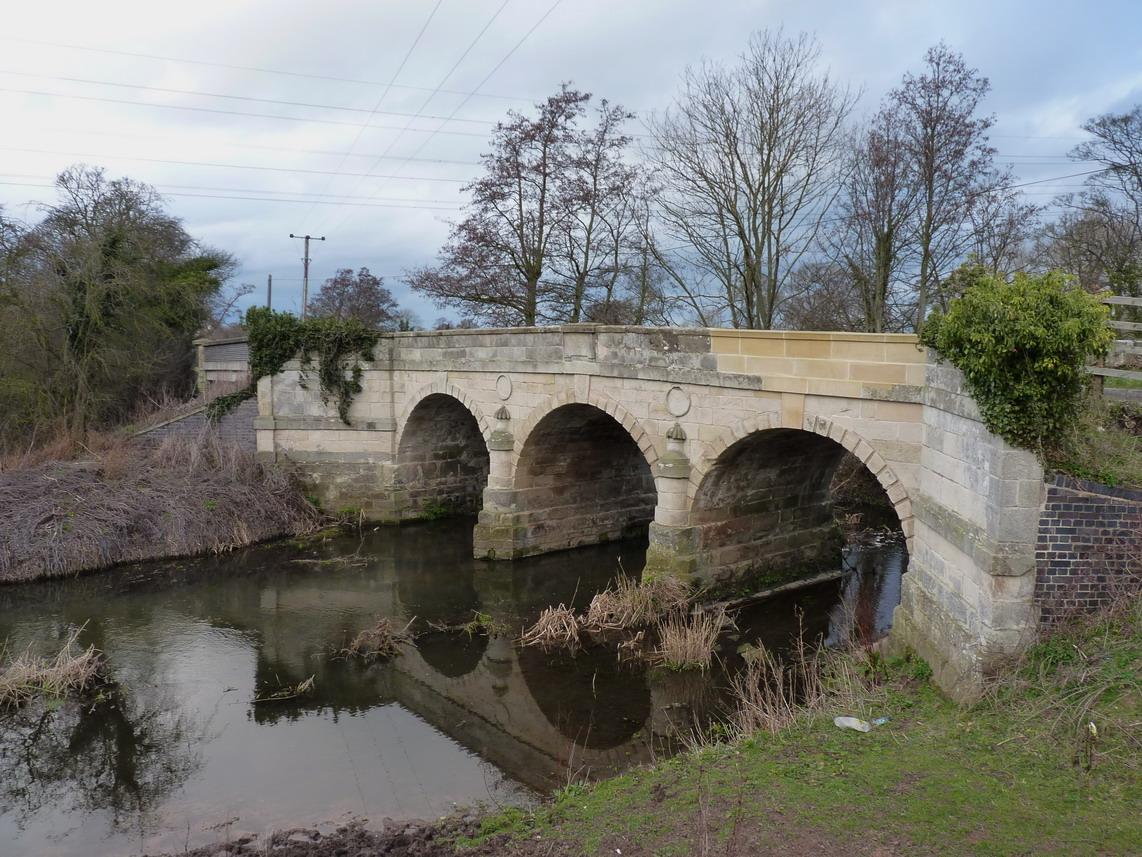
- Walcot Bridge, dated 1782

- Location within Shropshire
- OS grid reference: SJ593119
- Civil parish: Wrockwardine
- Unitary authority: Telford and Wrekin
- Ceremonial county: Shropshire
- Region: West Midlands
- Country: England
- Sovereign state: United Kingdom
- Post town: TELFORD
- Postcode district: TF6
- Dialling code: 01952
- Police: West Mercia
- Fire: Shropshire
- Ambulance: West Midlands
- UK Parliament: The Wrekin

Walcot is a small village in the borough of Telford and Wrekin and ceremonial county of Shropshire, England.

The village is situated equidistant between Shrewsbury and Wellington. Surrounding villages include Allscott, Withington, and Wrockwardine; Walcot forms part of the parish of Wrockwardine.

The Grade II* listed Walcot Bridge spans the River Tern. it was built in 1782 and is of ashlar with three rusticated round-arches. Above its cutwaters are semi-circular 'pilasters'. A panel at the centre is inscribed with date MDCCLXXXII and inscription "the last Edifice erected by that ingenious Architect William Hayward". William Hayward (circa 1740–1782), also designed the bridge over the River Tern at Atcham, Shropshire and the bridge over the Thames at Henley, Oxfordshire.

Walcot Hall, named after the Walcot family, is in the village of Lydbury North, 40 km (25 miles) south-west of Shrewsbury.

== See also ==
- Listed buildings in Wrockwardine
