= Aston, Telford and Wrekin =

Hamlet in Shropshire, England

Coordinates: 52.683°N 2.574°W

Aston
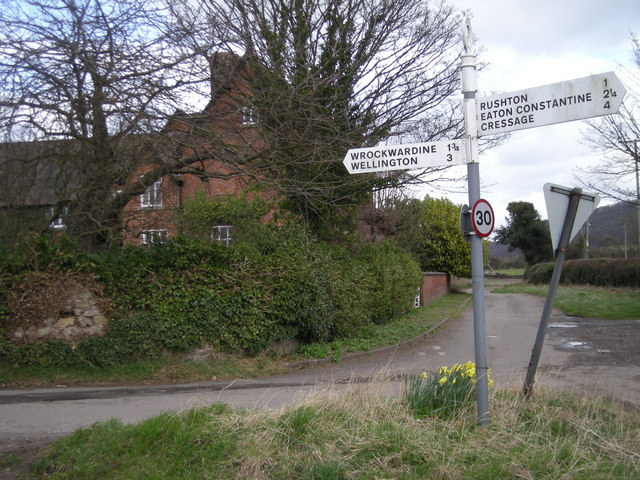
- Fingerpost at Aston

- Location within Shropshire
- OS grid reference: SJ612096
- Civil parish: Wrockwardine
- Unitary authority: Telford and Wrekin
- Ceremonial county: Shropshire
- Region: West Midlands
- Country: England
- Sovereign state: United Kingdom
- Post town: TELFORD
- Postcode district: TF6
- Dialling code: 01952
- Police: West Mercia
- Fire: Shropshire
- Ambulance: West Midlands
- UK Parliament: The Wrekin

Aston is a hamlet in Wrockwardine civil parish, Shropshire, England.

Aston has three Grade II listed buildings: Aston Hall, Aston Farmhouse and a 17th century timber-framed, thatched cottage.
