= Listed buildings in Rodington, Shropshire =

Rodington is a civil parish in the district of Telford and Wrekin, Shropshire, England. It contains 20 listed buildings that are recorded in the National Heritage List for England. Of these, one is listed at Grade I, the highest of the three grades, two are at Grade II*, the middle grade, and the others are at Grade II, the lowest grade. The parish contains the villages of Rodington and Longdon-on-Tern, and is otherwise rural. The Shrewsbury Canal, now disused, passed through the parish, and a surviving cast iron aqueduct is listed. Most of the other listed buildings are houses and associated structures, cottages, farmhouses and farm buildings, the earliest of which are timber framed. The other listed buildings include a public house, two churches, and two bridges.

== Key ==
Grade	Criteria
I	Buildings of exceptional interest, sometimes considered to be internationally important
II*	Particularly important buildings of more than special interest
II	Buildings of national importance and special interest

== Buildings ==
Name and location	Photograph	Date	Notes	Grade
Bush Cottage; 52.73484°N 2.56604°W	—	16th century (probable)	The cottage, which has been considerably altered, is timber framed with cruck construction and brick infill, and has an asbestos tile roof. There is one storey and an attic, three bays, and a modern brick rear wing. In the centre is a modern bow window which is flanked by casement windows, and there are three gabled dormers. Inside are two cruck trusses.	II
Remains of Rodington Hall; 52.72489°N 2.60789°W		16th century (probable)	All that remains of the hall are two storeys of a chimney stack. This is in sandstone, and it contains a Tudor arched fireplace in the ground floor and the remains of another fireplace above.	II
Longdon Hall; 52.73483°N 2.56026°W	—	Late 16th century	The remaining part of a former E-shaped house, with an 18th-century extension. It is in red brick with stone dressings on a stone plinth, with quoins, a moulded string course and tile roofs. There are two storeys and an attic, and a rear wing. The doorway on the front has a moulded surround and a Tudor arched head, and at the rear is a doorway with reeded pilasters and a dentilled cornice. There is one sash window, and the other windows are mullioned or mullioned and transomed.	II*
Stables near the remains of Rodington Hall; 52.72431°N 2.60736°W		16th to 17th century	The stables are timber framed with brick infill, and the western part has been encased in red brick with dentilled eaves. The roof is tiled and has gable ends.	II
Bull's Head Public House; 52.72562°N 2.61035°W		17th century	The oldest part is the rear wing, which is timber framed with brick infill. It has one storey and an attic, three casement windows and two gabled dormers. The front block is in brick with dentilled eaves, it has two storeys, three bays, and a single-storey wing to the left. The windows are casements, above the door is a modern hood, and both parts have tile roofs.	II
Sundial west of Longdon Hall; 52.73490°N 2.56063°W	—	17th century	The sundial is in stone, and is in the form of a baluster about 4 feet (1.2 m) high with a moulded base.	II
The Gables; 52.72830°N 2.63595°W	—	1663	A timber framed cottage with brick infill and a tile roof. There is one storey and an attic, two bays, and a brick single-storey lean-to at the north end. The windows are casements.	II
2 Drury Lane; 52.72780°N 2.63596°W	—	Late 17th century	A timber framed cottage with brick infill and a tile roof. There are two storeys, two bays, and a 19th-century brick extension to the rear painted to resemble timber framing. The windows are casements.	II
Isombridge Cottages; 52.72009°N 2.57823°W	—	Late 17th century	A row of timber framed cottages that are roughcast and have a tile roof. There is one storey and attics, three bays, and a later rear brick wing. The windows are mullioned and transomed casements, and there are three gabled dormers.	II
St Bartholomew's Church, Longdon; 52.73534°N 2.55996°W		1742	The nave was extended, the chancel was added, and other alterations were made in about 1854. The church is built in red brick with stone dressings, and has tile roofs. It consists of a nave, a gabled south porch, and a chancel. At the west end is a bellcote, and inside is a west gallery.	II
Barn east of Longdon Hall; 52.73465°N 2.55941°W	—	18th century	The barn is in red brick, and has a tile roof with a parapeted gable end to the west. There are four bays, ventilation holes on all sides, and a gabled cart entrance on the south side.	II
St George's Church, Rodington; 52.72555°N 2.60912°W		1751	The church was extended in 1851–52 when the north aisle, the chancel and the bellcote were added. The church is built in red brick with stone dressings, and consists of a nave, a north aisle, and a chancel with a polygonal apse. On the west gable is a timber corbelled-out bellcote with a tiled spire. The windows in the chancel are lancets, and elsewhere they have plate tracery.	II
Walcot Bridge; 52.70751°N 2.60342°W		1782	The bridge carries a road over the River Tern, it is in stone, and consists of three rusticated round arches with keyblocks. The bridge has a string course, a parapet with an inscribed tablet, and above the cutwaters are semicircular pilasters. The abutments splay outwards, and end in square piers.	II*
Longdon Aqueduct; 52.73703°N 2.56787°W		1795	One of the earliest cast iron aqueducts in the world, it was built to carry the Shrewsbury Canal (now disused) over the River Tern. The aqueduct consists of an iron trough with a square section carried on iron uprights, and attached to the south side is the towpath with iron railings. At each end are abutments in brick and sandstone with round arches. The aqueduct is also a Scheduled Monument.	I
Bridge southwest of Longdon Aqueduct; 52.73607°N 2.56971°W		1813	The bridge carries the B5063 road over the River Tern. It is in sandstone, and consists of a single rusticated segmental arch. The bridge has a string course and a coped parapet that is curved at the ends.	II
Grove House; 52.72783°N 2.60769°W	—	c. 1820–30	A red brick house that has a slate roof with coped gables. There are two storeys and three bays. In the centre is a wide portico with Tuscan columns and an entablature, and the windows are sashes with segmental heads.	II
Longswood Farmhouse; 52.74221°N 2.55686°W	—	Early 19th century	The farmhouse is in red brick with dentilled eaves and a tile roof. There are two storeys and an attic, three bays, and a gabled rear wing. In the centre is a porch and a doorway with a moulded surround. The windows are casements, those in the lower floors with segmental-arched heads and fluted keystones.	II
Rodington House; 52.72598°N 2.61296°W	—	Early 19th century	A red brick house with dentilled eaves and a tile roof with parapeted gables. There are two storeys and four bays. On the front is a trellis porch, the doorway has a moulded surround, and the windows are sashes with segmental-arched heads.	II
Rodington Hall Farmhouse; 52.72511°N 2.61090°W	—	Early 19th century	The farmhouse is in red brick, and has a slate roof with coped gables. There are two storeys and three bays, the middle bay projecting forward and pedimented. In the centre is a portico with Tuscan columns and an entablature, and the windows are sashes.	II
The Villa; 52.72853°N 2.60872°W	—	Early 19th century	A red brick house with dentilled eaves and a tile roof with parapeted gables. There are two storeys and three bays. In the centre is a doorway with a reeded architrave and an arched hood on brackets. The windows are sashes with voussoired lintels and keyblocks.	II
