= Orleton Hall =

Country house and estate in Wrockwardine, Shropshire, England

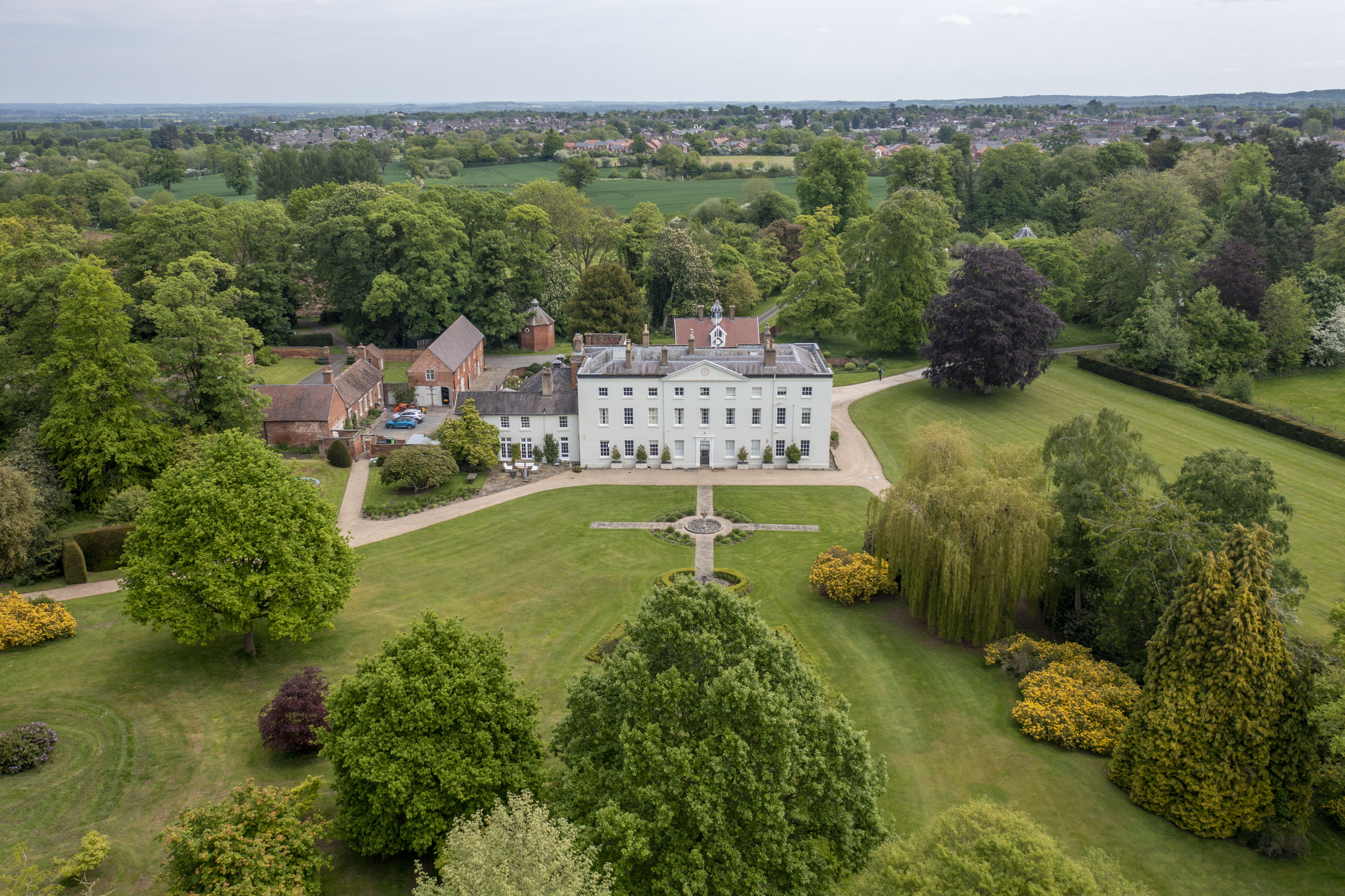

- Location within Shropshire
- 52.698°N 2.5422°W
- Location: Wrockwardine, Shropshire, England

History
- Built: c.1830
- Built for: Edward Cludde
- Original use: Country house

Site notes
- Architect: Edward Haycock Sr.
- Architectural style: Neoclassical
- Governing body: Privately owned

Listed Building – Grade II*
- Official name: Orleton Hall
- Designated: 17 June 1959
- Reference no.: 1033348

Listed Building – Grade II*
- Official name: Orleton Hall gazebo
- Designated: 18 June 1959
- Reference no.: 1033349

Listed Building – Grade II
- Official name: Orleton Hall Gatehouse and Bridge
- Designated: 21 June 1996
- Reference no.: 1217897

Listed Building – Grade II
- Official name: Orleton Hall Dovecote
- Designated: 8 April 1983
- Reference no.: 1217910

National Register of Historic Parks and Gardens
- Official name: Orleton Hall gardens
- Designated: 1 December 1986
- Reference no.: 1001132

Orleton Hall is a country house and estate at Wrockwardine in Shropshire, England. A Grade II* listed building, the current house was designed c.1830 by Edward Haycock Sr. for Edward Cludde. The site is much older and was the ancestral home of the Cluddes, who took their name from the nearby village of Cluddley, from the 14th century.

== History ==
The Orleton estate was owned by the Cludde family from the 1300s. Their name derived from the village of Cluddley which stands close to the house. Remnants of the medieval manor house survive, including part of the original moat. In the 1830s, Edward Cludde engaged Edward Haycock Sr. of Shrewsbury to rebuild the ancient house in a Neoclassical style. In 1854, the Cludde heiress, Anna Maria, married Robert Charles Herbert, a younger son of Edward Herbert, 2nd Earl of Powis and their grandson ultimately succeeded as the 5th earl. The house remains a private home in possession of the family and is not open to the public.

== Architecture and description ==
The house is of three-storeys, and built of stuccoed stone. The severity of the neoclassical design has been criticised; "the windows devoid of any ornament, the [main] façade without plat bands or quoins, the doorway little more than an opening". The architectural historian John Newman, in the Shropshire volume of Pevsner's Buildings of England, described the house as "plain", although he acknowledged the, probably earlier, "pretty details [such] as the oval window, the dormer and the lantern".

Orleton Hall is a Grade II* listed building and its grounds are listed at Grade II on the Register of Historic Parks and Gardens of Special Historic Interest in England. They contain a "remarkable" gazebo, dating from the 18th century and in a Chinoiserie taste, which has its own Grade II* listing.

== See also ==
- Grade II* listed buildings in Shropshire Council (H–Z)
- Listed buildings in Wrockwardine

== Sources ==
- Mercer, Eric (2003). English architecture to 1900 : the Shropshire experience. Almeley, Herefordshire: Logaston Press. ISBN 9781904396086.
- Newman, John; Pevsner, Nikolaus (2006). Shropshire. The Buildings of England. New Haven, US and London: Yale University Press. ISBN 0-300-12083-4.
