= Nash, Telford and Wrekin =

Former human settlement

Coordinates: 52.69629°N 2.55336°W

Nash was a village in Shropshire, England which is believed to have been wiped out entirely by the Black Death of c.1349. It now no longer exists and is described as a lost settlement, deserted medieval village or abandoned village.

The 1349 manorial income for Nash (also referred to as Nesse) indicates that the village was unable to pay any monies "because the inhabitants are dead". Despite this, the village was home to a farmer called Hercules Felton in 1668 and it had three people paying hearth tax by 1672, and a single barn remained by 1839, suggesting that some human life remained in the area.

Nash has been completed deserted since at least the mid-19th century and the old site is located in the middle of fields near Wrockwardine, though no road or footpath survives to provide access to the area. A small wood near Drummery Lane marks the location where the foundations of house platforms are speculated to lie but no excavations have ever been conducted on the site of the lost village.
