= Listed buildings in Withington, Shropshire =

Withington is a civil parish in Shropshire, England. It contains 15 listed buildings that are recorded in the National Heritage List for England. Of these, one is listed at Grade II*, the middle of the three grades, and the others are at Grade II, the lowest grade. The parish contains the village of Withington and the surrounding area. All but one of the listed buildings are in the village, and most of these are houses, cottages and farmhouses, the earlier of which are timber framed. The other listed buildings are a church, a memorial in the churchyard, and two pumps.

== Key ==
Grade	Criteria
II*	Particularly important buildings of more than special interest
II	Buildings of national importance and special interest

== Buildings ==
Name and location	Photograph	Date	Notes	Grade
Church Farm Cottages; 52.71262°N 2.62721°W	—	Early 16th century	A farmhouse, later extended and divided into three dwellings. The earlier part is timber framed with brick infill, it has been refaced, rebuilt and extended in red brick, and the roof is tiled. There is a T-shaped plan, consisting of a four-bay hall range with one storey and an attic, and a three-bay cross-wing with two storeys. The flat-roofed porch is in the angle, the windows are casements, and in the hall range are dormers.	II
Yew Tree Cottage; 52.71380°N 2.62920°W	—	Mid to late 16th century	The cottage was partly rebuilt and extended in the 20th century. It is timber framed with red brick infill, and has a tile roof. There is one storey and an attic, and an L-shaped plan, consisting of a two bay hall range, and a gabled cross-wing to the right with two bays. There is a lean-to porch in the angle, the windows are casements, and there are three gabled dormers. The upper storey of the gable of the cross-wing is jettied and has a moulded bressumer on shaped brackets.	II
3 Caernarvon Road; 52.71487°N 2.62811°W	—	Late 16th or 17th century	The house was altered and extended in the 19th century. There is one storey and an attic, and a T-shaped plan, consisting of a weatherboarded hall range with a tile roof, and a gabled cross-wing to the left that is timber framed with painted brick infill and a thatched roof. The windows are casements, and there is a gabled dormer in the hall range.	II
The Old Vicarage; 52.71446°N 2.62517°W	—	Late 16th or 17th century	The house was altered and extended in the 20th century. The original part is timber framed with painted brick infill on a stone plinth, the extensions are in painted brick, and the roof is tiled. The original part consists of a two-bay hall range and a gabled one-bay cross-wing. The windows are casements, some with segmental heads.	II
The Shrubbery; 52.71397°N 2.62637°W	—	Early 17th century	The house was later altered and extended. It is timber framed with painted brick infill on a chamfered sandstone plinth, the alterations and extensions are in painted brick, and the roof is in tile and slate. The house is partly in one storey with a basement and an attic, and partly in two storeys, and it consists of a front range with three bays and two rear wings. There is a dentilled eaves cornice, and gables with fretted bargeboards and finials. The central doorway has reeded pilasters and a fanlight with Gothick tracery. Some windows are casements, and others are sashes.	II
Former farm cottage 52.71204°N 2.62161°W	—	17th century	The cottage was restored and extended in the 20th century. It is timber framed on a brick plinth and has a tile roof. There is one storey and an attic, and two bays. The windows are casements, and there are two raking dormers. Flanking the cottage, and recessed, are 20th-century red brick extensions.	II
The Gatehouse Cottage; 52.71343°N 2.63024°W	—	17th century (probable)	The cottage is in rendered timber framing with a slate roof. There is one storey and an attic, and two bays. Some windows are cross windows with segmental heads, and others are casements. Inside the cottage are timber framed partitions with wattle and daub panels.	II
Garden Cottage; 52.71430°N 2.62611°W	—	Mid to late 17th century	The cottage is timber framed with brick infill and a tile roof. There is one storey and an attic, two bays, and a later brick lean-to on the left. The windows are casements, and there are two gabled eaves dormers.	II
The Old Hall; 52.71317°N 2.62773°W	—	c. 1700	A vicarage, later a private house, it is in red brick with a storey band, rendered quoins, a moulded dentilled eaves cornice, and a hipped tile roof. There are two storeys and an attic, a U-shaped plan with two gabled rear wings, later infilled, and a front of six bays. In the centre is a porch with unfluted Doric columns and pilasters, a frieze, and a cornice, and a doorway with a moulded architrave. The left return has five bays, and contains a hipped-roof canted bay window. The windows are sashes, those in the upper floor with panels below.	II*
The Old Cottage; 52.71696°N 2.62681°W	—	Late 17th to early 18th century	The cottage, which has been altered and extended, is timber framed with brick infill and a tile roof. There is one storey and an attic, one bay, and a one-storey extension to the right. On the front is a gabled porch, the windows are casements, and there is a flat-topped dormer. Inside, there is complete timber framing.	II
Manor Farmhouse; 52.71521°N 2.62969°W	—	1710	A farmhouse, since divided, it is in red brick with a band, a moulded dentilled eaves cornice, and a tile roof with a coped gable end. There are two storeys at the front, three at the back, five bays, a single-storey lean-to and a recessed two-storey service wing on the right. Three semicircular steps lead up to a central doorway that has a moulded architrave, a fanlight, and a flat hood. The windows in the main block are sashes, and in the lean-to they are casements.	II
Smith Memorial; 52.71274°N 2.62772°W	—	1798	The memorial is in the churchyard of St John the Baptist's Church, and is to the memory of Robert Smith. It is a chest tomb in sandstone, and has a moulded plinth, fluted corner piers, rectangular side panels and circular end panels with rosettes, and a moulded cornice to a chamfered top.	II
Pump, 3 Caernarvon Road; 52.71484°N 2.62807°W	—	Mid to late 19th century	The pump is in cast iron. It has a circular shaft with moulded rings, a fluted top with a splayed spout, a fluted domed cap, and a curved handle.	II
Pump, Church Farm Cottages; 52.71256°N 2.62704°W	—	Mid to late 19th century	The pump is in cast iron. It has a circular shaft with moulded rings, a plain top with a splayed spout, a fluted domed cap, and a curved handle.	II
St John the Baptists' Church; 52.71280°N 2.62776°W		1870–72	The church, designed by G. E, Street, is in sandstone with a tile roof. It consists of a nave, a north porch, a chancel, a north vestry, and a west tower. The tower has four stages, angle buttresses, a clock face on the west side, a corbel table with ball flower ornament, and a broach spire with a weathervane.	II
