= Listed buildings in Upton Magna =

Upton Magna is a civil parish in Shropshire, England. It contains 22 listed buildings that are recorded in the National Heritage List for England. Of these, two are listed at Grade II*, the middle of the three grades, and the others are at Grade II, the lowest grade. The parish contains the village of Upton Magna and is otherwise rural. The Shrewsbury Branch of the Shropshire Union Canal ran through the parish. It is now disused but three structures associated with it have been listed, namely a bridge and the entrances to a tunnel. In the village, most of the listed buildings are houses, cottages and associated structures, the earliest of these are timber framed. Also in the village and listed are a church and items in the churchyard. Outside the village, the other listed buildings include farmhouses and associated structures, a house and cottages.

== Key ==
Grade	Criteria
II*	Particularly important buildings of more than special interest
II	Buildings of national importance and special interest

== Buildings ==
Name and location	Photograph	Date	Notes	Grade
St Lucia's Church; 52.70809°N 2.66249°W		12th century	The tower was added in the 15th century, and the church was restored in 1860–61 by G. E. Street, who added the south porch, the north aisle and the vestry. It is built in sandstone with a tile roof, and consists of a nave with a south porch, a north aisle, a chancel and a vestry, and a west tower. The nave and chancel are in Norman style, and the tower is Perpendicular. The tower has two stages, diagonal buttresses, a semi-hexagonal stair turret, string courses with carved heads, a quatrefoil frieze with corner gargoyles, an embattled parapet, and a pyramidal cap with a weathervane.	II*
Cruck Cottage; 52.70870°N 2.66214°W	—	15th or 16th century {probable)	The cottage was altered in about 1600 and in the 19th century. It is timber framed with cruck construction and painted brick nogging, and has a thatched roof. There is one storey and an attic, and four bays. The windows are casements, and there is a gabled dormer. Inside are two full cruck trusses, which have been dated to be the second oldest standing cruck trusses in Europe.	II
Church Farmhouse; 52.70749°N 2.66338°W	—	Late 16th century	The farmhouse was extended in the 19th century. The original part is timber framed with painted and rendered brick nogging, the rebuilding and extension are in brick, and the roof is tiled. There are two storeys and an attic, and an L-shaped plan with a front of three bays and a rear wing. On the front is a timber framed porch, the windows in the upper floor are casements, and in the ground floor they are cross-windows. The rear wing has a dentilled eaves cornice, segmental-headed casement windows, and a gabled porch.	II
Downton Farmhouse; 52.71161°N 2.67784°W	—	Late 16th century	The farmhouse, which was later extended, is timber framed on a painted brick plinth, with brick nogging and partial refacing and extensions in brick, and a tile roof. It is partly in two storeys, and partly in two storeys with an attic, and has an L-shaped plan. There is a range of five bays, and a wing at right angles with one bay. The wing has a jettied upper storey and gable with moulded bressumers. The windows are casements, and there are gabled dormers.	II*
Criftins; 52.71883°N 2.66647°W	—	17th century	A pair of cottages that were altered and extended in the 19th century. The original part is timber framed with brick nogging, partly painted, the extension and partial refacing are in brick, partly painted, and the roof is thatched. There is one storey and an attic, and three bays. The windows are casements, and there are three gabled dormers.	II
The Corner House; 52.70854°N 2.66146°W		17th century	A timber framed house with painted brick nogging, partly refaced in brick and painted, with a slate roof. There is one storey and an attic, the upper storey partly jettied at the rear, and two bays. The doorway has an ogee-shaped hood on brackets, the windows are casements, and there is a gabled half-dormer.	II
The Gatehouse; 52.70735°N 2.66242°W	—	17th century	A timber framed house with painted brick nogging on a brick plinth, with a tile roof and a crested ridge. There is one storey and an attic, and an irregular cruciform plan. On the north front is a three-light oriel window and a canted bay window. The other windows are casements.	II
The Porch House; 52.70844°N 2.66199°W	—	Mid 17th century	A timber framed house with painted brick nogging and a tile roof. There are two storeys, two bays, and a lean-to extension at the rear. On the front is a rustic gabled porch, and the windows are casements. The gable ends are jettied with decorated bressumers.	II
Walnut Cottage; 52.70868°N 2.66185°W		17th century	A timber framed cottage with rendered brick nogging and a thatched roof. There is one storey and an attic, three bays, and a lean-to extension on the right with a tile roof. On the front is a thatched porch, the windows are casements and there are two gabled dormers; the windows have diamond glazing.	II
Forge Farmhouse; 52.69954°N 2.64776°W	—	Mid to late 17th century	The farmhouse was extended in the 19th and 20th centuries. The original part is timber framed with painted and rendered brick nogging, the rebuilding and extensions are in brick, and the roof is tiled. There is one storey and an attic, a front of three bays, and later extensions. The windows are casements, and there are three large gabled eaves dormers.	II
8 Upton Magna; 52.70958°N 2.66132°W	—	Late 17th century	The cottage was extended in the 20th century. It is timber framed with red brick nogging and a tile roof. There is one storey and an attic, two bays, and a later one-storey brick lean-to on the left. The windows are casements, and there are two gabled dormers.	II
The Old Shop; 52.73541°N 2.66327°W	—	Late 17th or early 18th century	The house, which was extended later, is timber framed on a stone plinth, with rendered infill, extensions in brick, and with a tile roof. It is partly in one storey and partly in one storey with an attic. The windows are casements, and there are gabled half-dormers.	II
Former Shropshire Union canal bridge 52.70163°N 2.65782°W		1790s	The bridge carried a road over the Shrewsbury Branch, now disused, of the Shropshire Union Canal. It is in brick with sandstone dressings and consists of a single elliptical arch. The bridge has moulded voussoirs, two chamfered string courses, a coping stone at the centre of the parapet, and square end piers.	II
Northwest entrance, Berwick Tunnel; 52.70424°N 2.69449°W		1797	The tunnel entrance is on the Shrewsbury Branch of the Shropshire Union Canal, which is now unused, and the entrance has been bricked up. It is in red sandstone and consists of a parabolic arch with chamfered voussoirs and triple keystones, curved retaining walls, a string course, a central square datestone, a coped parapet raised in the centre, and coped square end piers.	II
Southwest entrance, Berwick Tunnel; 52.69883°N 2.68473°W	—	1797	The tunnel entrance is on the Shrewsbury Branch of the Shropshire Union Canal, which is now unused, and the entrance has been bricked up. It is in red sandstone and consists of a parabolic arch with chamfered voussoirs and triple keystones, curved retaining walls, a string course, a central square datestone, a coped parapet raised in the centre, and coped square end piers.	II
Allen memorial 52.70793°N 2.66250°W	—	Late 18th or early 19th century	The memorial is in the churchyard of St Lucia's Church, and is to the memory of Jane Allen, a baby, and others. It is a pedestal tomb in grey sandstone, and has a panelled plinth with a moulded top, sides with Gothic-panelled corner piers, and a moulded cornice to a pyramidal top. Some inscriptions are illegible.	II
Group of six chest tombs 52.70784°N 2.66237°W	—	Late 18th or early 19th century	The chest tombs are in the churchyard of St Lucia's Church, and are in grey sandstone. They are to the memory of members of the Lloyd, Humphries, and Ellsmere families.	II
Nevett memorial 52.70796°N 2.66258°W	—	Early 19th century	The memorial is in the churchyard of St Lucia's Church, and is to the memory of Mary Nevett and others. It is a pedestal tomb in grey sandstone, and has raised side-panels with shaped tops, panelled corner piers, and a moulded cornice to a chamfered top with the base of an urn finial. Some inscriptions are illegible.	II
Pump, The Old Rectory; 52.70799°N 2.66131°W	—	Mid 19th century	The pump is to the north of the house, and is in cast iron. It has a circular shaft with moulded rings, a plain top with a splayed spout, a fluted domed cap with a finial, and a curved handle with a decorative bracket.	II
Lychgate; 52.70823°N 2.66199°W		c. 1856	The lychgate at the entrance to the churchyard of St Lucia's Church has grey sandstone walls, a timber framed superstructure, and a hipped tile roof. It contains a pair of wooden gates.	II
The Old Rectory; 52.70772°N 2.66132°W	—	1864–65	The rectory, later a private house, was designed by G. E. Street. It is in red brick with half-hipped tiled roofs, one storey and attics, and an irregular plan. The windows are mullioned and transomed, and on the front is a gabled timber porch with a pierced segmental-arched canopy. Other features include herringbone brickwork in the tympana of the windows, and a staircase turret with a lancet window.	II
Pump, Downton Farm; 52.71160°N 2.67773°W	—	Mid 19th century	The pump is in the farmyard, and is in painted cast iron. It has a circular shaft with moulded rings, a fluted top with a splayed spout, a fluted domed cap, and a curved handle.	II
