= Rodington =

Village in Shropshire, England

Coordinates: 52.725°N 2.609°W

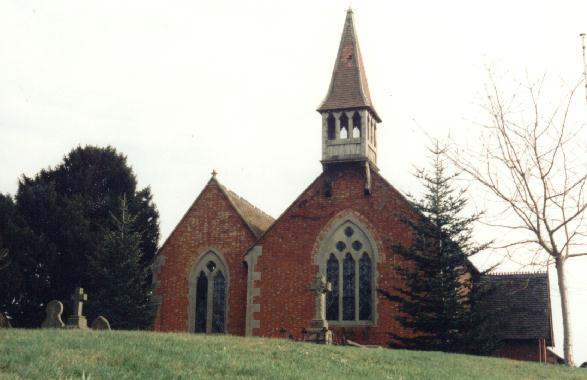
- Rodington church

- Location within Shropshire
- Population: 830 (2011)
- OS grid reference: SJ588143
- Civil parish: Rodington
- Unitary authority: Telford and Wrekin
- Ceremonial county: Shropshire
- Region: West Midlands
- Country: England
- Sovereign state: United Kingdom
- Post town: SHREWSBURY
- Postcode district: SY4
- Post town: TELFORD
- Postcode district: TF6
- Dialling code: 01952
- Police: West Mercia
- Fire: Shropshire
- Ambulance: West Midlands
- UK Parliament: The Wrekin

Rodington is a village in Shropshire, England. Situated between the towns of Wellington and Shrewsbury it lies on the relatively level Shropshire plain and in the borough of Telford & Wrekin.

The Church of England parish church, St George's, although listed in the Domesday Book was extensively re-built in the Victorian era. Its deanery is Wrockwardine and its Diocese Lichfield.

The village pub, the Bull has changed ownership a number of times in recent years. Having been closed for refurbishment for a long time, it re-opened in October 2007.

Rodington village hall is one of the larger venues in the immediate area, it contains a main room with stage, dressing rooms, a bar, a kitchen and also contains the village post office. The hall is available for renting for private functions and normally runs a variety of concerts every two or three weeks through the winter season.

The River Roden flows through the village and visible in some of the fields are the remains of the Shropshire Canal.

Professional footballer Steve Jagielka (1978–2021) lived at Rodington at the time of his death.

== See also ==
- Listed buildings in Rodington, Shropshire
