= Tibberton and Cherrington =

Civil parish in Shropshire, England

Coordinates: 52.778°N 2.487°W

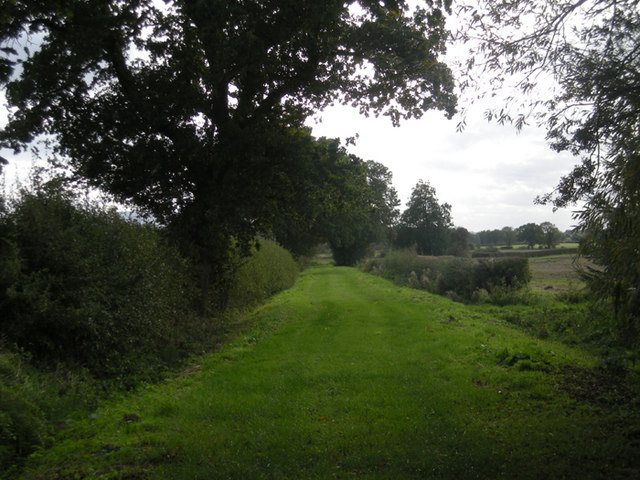
- This green lane forms a short section of the parish boundary south of Shray Hill

- Location within Shropshire
- Population: 684 (2001 census)
- Civil parish: Tibberton and Cherrington
- Unitary authority: Telford and Wrekin
- Ceremonial county: Shropshire
- Region: West Midlands
- Country: England
- Sovereign state: United Kingdom
- Police: West Mercia
- Fire: Shropshire
- Ambulance: West Midlands

Tibberton and Cherrington is a parish in the Telford and Wrekin borough of Shropshire, England.

It consists of the villages of Tibberton and Cherrington. The population was 684 at the 2001 census.

== Geography ==
The majority of the parish is made up of open agricultural land, with the areas in the south-west and south-east respectively known as the Cherrington and Tibberton Moors, being at the northern extremity of the area known as the Weald Moors. In the north the boundary is formed by the River Meese, while part of the southern boundary runs along the River Strine.

A small area of the parish near Cherrington Manor is a near-exclave, being almost completely surrounded by the parish of Waters Upton.

== History ==
The civil parish was originally formed by a merger of Tibberton and Cherrington, two parishes of the pre-1974 Wellington Rural District. They had both originally been townships of the manor, and later parish, of Edgmond. The rivalry between the outlying townships of this parish was expressed in a local rhyme, recorded by Shropshire folklorist Charlotte Burne during the 19th century:

"Tibberton tawnies and Cherrington chats,
Edgement bulldogs and Adeney cats,
Edgement bulldogs made up in a pen,
Darna come out for Tibberton men"

Various versions of the rhyme - the version above was from Tibberton - were often used to tease the residents of neighbouring villages, or when couples from outlying townships were married in the parish church. People from Edgmond told her that "chats" meant "gossips", and a Tibberton resident explained that the residents of their village were known for their unusually dark complexions, hence "tawnies" ("this is true as regards the only family I had any particular knowledge of", remarked Burne).

== See also ==
- Listed buildings in Tibberton and Cherrington
