= Listed buildings in Waters Upton =

Waters Upton is a civil parish in the district of Telford and Wrekin, Shropshire, England. It contains 29 listed buildings that are recorded in the National Heritage List for England. Of these, two are at Grade II*, the middle of the three grades, and the others are at Grade II, the lowest grade. The parish includes the villages of Waters Upton, Crudgington and Great Bolas, and is otherwise rural. Most of the listed buildings are houses and cottages and associated structures, farmhouses and farm buildings, the earliest of which are timber framed. The other listed buildings include two churches and associated structures, and a bridge.

== Key ==
Grade	Criteria
II*	Particularly important buildings of more than special interest
II	Buildings of national importance and special interest

== Buildings ==
Name and location	Photograph	Date	Notes	Grade
Cruck Cottage; 52.75412°N 2.54848°W	—	16th century (probable)	The cottage, which has been extended, is timber framed with cruck construction and rendered infill, and has a tile roof. There is one storey and an attic, and one bay, with later extensions to the east and to the south. The doorway has a gabled hood, the windows are casements, and there is a gabled dormer.	II
The Hall; 52.77200°N 2.54415°W		16th century	The hall, originally timber framed, was completely encased in red brick in the early 18th century. It has a moulded eaves cornice and a hipped tile roof. There are two storeys and an attic, and an L-shaped plan with a front of four bays and a projecting gabled wing on the left. On the front are two ground floor canted bay windows, and a two-storey bay window in the left wing. The doorway is pedimented, the windows are sashes, and there are three gabled dormers.	II*
Crudgington House; 52.75940°N 2.54650°W	—	16th or 17th century	A timber framed cottage with brick infill and a tile roof. There is one storey and an attic, and an L-shaped plan, consisting of a main range, a cross-wing, and a later brick wing at the south. The windows are casements.	II
Little Gables; 52.75910°N 2.54657°W	—	16th or 17th century	A timber framed cottage with rendered infill, the south end entirely rendered. There is one storey and an attic, and a front of five bays. At the north end are two gables, one of which is jettied. On the front is a gabled porch, the windows are casements, and there is a large gabled dormer at the south end.	II
The Lilacs; 52.75897°N 2.54693°W	—	16th or 17th century	A timber framed cottage with brick infill and a tile roof. There is one storey and an attic, and a brick extension to the south. The windows are casements.	II
The White House, Great Bolas; 52.78941°N 2.52129°W	—	16th or 17th century	The original part of the house is timber framed, a brick gabled cross-wing was added to the west in the 18th century, and the house was completely encased in brick in the 19th century. It is painted and has a tile roof. There is one storey and an attic, five bays, four gables on the front, and the windows are casement windows. Inside is exposed timber framing.	II
Barn, Waters Upton Hall; 52.77216°N 2.54395°W		16th or 17th century	The barn has four bays and a tile roof. The southern two bays are timber framed with red brick infill and some weatherboarding. The northern two bays are lower, they are in sandstone with vents, and contain a cartway.	II
Meeson Hall and outbuilding 52.78274°N 2.50911°W	—	1638	The house was remodelled in the 19th century and extended at the rear in the 20th century. It is in sandstone with a tile roof. There are two storeys and an attic, and three gabled bays, the middle bay slightly recessed and containing a porch. The windows are mullioned and transomed, and on the sides are projecting chimney breasts. At the rear is a timber framed outbuilding.	II
Bridge Farmhouse; 52.75622°N 2.55116°W	—	17th century	A timber framed cottage with brick infill and refacing and extension in brick, and a tile roof. There is one storey and an attic, and a T-shaped plan, consisting of the main range and a brick wing. The windows are casements, and there are gabled dormers.	II
St John's Church; 52.78861°N 2.52428°W		1661–92	The oldest part of the church is the chancel, the nave and tower being added in 1726–29. The chancel is in sandstone, and the rest of the church is in red brick with Grinshill sandstone dressings and a tile roof. The church consists of a nave with a lower chancel and a west tower. The tower has corner pilasters, round-arched openings with keystones, oculi, and a parapet with gadrooned urns on the corners. The doorway and windows have round heads.	II*
1 Crudgington; 52.75848°N 2.54898°W	—	Late 17th to early 18th century	The cottage was later extended. The original part is timber framed with painted brick infill, the extensions are in brick and sandstone, and the roof is tiled. There is one storey and an attic, a front of three bays, and a one bay extension to the north. The windows are casements, and there are three gabled dormers.	II
Crescent House; 52.77167°N 2.54313°W		18th century	The house was remodelled in the 19th century. It is in stuccoed brick with a tile roof, two storeys, two bays, and two gabled rear wings. In the ground floor are two canted bay windows, and the windows are sashes.	II
Lower House; 52.77338°N 2.54008°W	—	18th century	The house was remodelled in the 19th century. It is in red brick with a dentilled eaves course and a tile roof. There are three storeys and three bays. The central doorway has reeded pilasters, panelled reveals, a rectangular fanlight, and an entablature with a panelled frieze. The windows are sashes with voussoired lintels and keyblocks. In front of the garden is a dwarf brick wall with stone coping and wrought iron railings.	II
Manor Farmhouse; 52.78885°N 2.52104°W	—	18th century	A red brick farmhouse, the front painted, with a tile roof and parapeted gables. There are two storeys and an L-shaped plan, with a front of three bays and a rear wing. To the left is a small porch, and the rear wing has a shaped parapet. The windows are casements with segmental arches and keyblocks.	II
Mill Cottages; 52.77316°N 2.54037°W	—	18th century	The cottages are in brick with tiled roofs and at right angles to the road. The main cottage has a dentilled eaves course and crow-stepped gables. There is one storey and an attic, and three bays. The doorway has a moulded surround and a pedimented hood on brackets. The windows are mullioned and transomed casements with segmental heads, and there are two eaves dormers. Attached at the far end is a 19th-century two-storey single-bay cottage.	II
Sundial; 52.78842°N 2.52450°W	—	18th century (probable)	The sundial is in the churchyard of St John's Church. It is in sandstone, and consists of a column on a stepped square base. The abacus is damaged and the sundial is missing.	II
Coach house, Waters Upton Hall; 52.77185°N 2.54378°W		18th century	The former coach house with a hay loft above is in red brick with dentilled eaves and a pyramidal tile roof. There are two storeys and a square plan. In the ground floor is a modern garage door, the upper floor contains a small circular pitching hole, and on the roof is a weathervane.	II
White House, Waters Upton; 52.77135°N 2.54330°W		18th century	The house was extended in the 19th century by the addition of a wing at right angles. It is in whitewashed brick with a dentilled eaves course, and has a tile roof with parapeted gable ends. There are two storeys and ranges of three and one bay. The original range has been extended in sandstone, and a garage has been added to the other range. In the angle is a semicircular porch, and the windows are sashes.	II
Burleigh; 52.79036°N 2.49616°W	—	Late 18th century	A red brick house with a tile roof, parapet gable ends and kneelers. There are three storeys, nine bays, and a recessed two-storey wing on the left. The central doorway has pilasters and console brackets, and the windows are sashes.	II
Stables northwest of Burleigh; 52.79052°N 2.49639°W	—	Late 18th century	The stables are in red brick with a tile roof. There are two storeys and five bays, the outer and middle bays projecting and having round-arched recesses. In the ground floor are stable doors and segmental-headed windows, and the upper floor contains four-light lunettes.	II
Bolas Bridge; 52.78301°N 2.52279°W		1795	The bridge carries a road over the River Meese, it is in sandstone, and consists of a single round arch. The bridge has a large keystone, a parapet with coping, a string course, and curving abutments with pilasters.	II
Churchyard wall, St John's Church; 52.78875°N 2.52416°W	—	18th or 19th century	The wall enclosing the churchyard is built in large blocks of sandstone with half-round coping, and acts as a retaining wall for the churchyard.	II
Churchyard wall, St Michael's Church; 52.77147°N 2.54382°W		18th or 19th century	The wall on the north side of the churchyard is in sandstone with ramped coping. It acts as a retaining wall for the churchyard, and contains gate piers near the centre.	II
Crudgington Leasowes Farmhouse; 52.75971°N 2.53945°W	—	1817	A red brick house with dentilled eaves, and a tile roof with stone coping and kneelers to the gable ends. There are two storeys and an attic and three bays. In the centre is a porch with an inscribed and dated table above, and the windows are sashes.	II
Bolas House; 52.79265°N 2.51799°W	—	Early 19th century	A red brick house with a hipped slate roof, and three storeys. There are three bays, the middle bay projecting under a pediment. The central doorway has pilasters, a rectangular fanlight, and an entablature, and the windows are sashes.	II
Fir Tree; 52.77143°N 2.54277°W		Early 19th century	A house in painted sandstone with a tile roof, two storeys and two bays. In the centre is a doorway with pilasters, panelled reveals, and an entablature with a cornice, and the windows are sashes.	II
The Rectory; 52.78753°N 2.52651°W	—	c. 1840 (probable)	The house possibly has an earlier core. It is in sandstone with a tile roof and two storeys. There are four bays, and projecting cross-wings with coped gables and moulded kneelers. On the front is a gabled porch with a four-centred arch and a hood mould. The windows are mullioned and transomed casements with chamfered surrounds and hood moulds, and there is a first-floor canted bay window. In an angle at the rear is a stair tower.	II
Garden wall, The Hall; 52.77158°N 2.54383°W	—	19th century (probable)	The wall is probably built from reused stone. It is a low wall in sandstone with ranged coping, and contains timber gate piers.	II
St Michael's Church; 52.77133°N 2.54387°W		1864–65	The church was designed by G. E. Street in Early English style. It is built in pink sandstone with a tile roof, and consists of a nave with a timber framed north porch, and a chancel. Corbelled out over the west gable is a polygonal bellcote. At the west end is a rose window, and the other windows are lancets.	II
