= Adney =

Adney is an English locative name from Adeney. Notable people with this surname include:

- Syed Adney (born 1986), Malaysian footballer
- Tappan Adney (1868–1950), American-Canadian artist, a writer and a photographer

== See also ==
- Adeney, variant spelling
- Edney, possible variant spelling
- Adney Helicopter - a 1940s Australian helicopter
