= Adeney (surname) =

Adeney is an English locative name from Adeney. Notable people with this surname include:

- Bernard Adeney (1878–1966), English painter
- Chris Adeney, Canadian singer-songwriter better known by his stage name Wax Mannequin
- David Howard Adeney (1911–1994), British missionary to China
- Peter Adeney, known as Mr. Money Mustache, financial blogger
- Richard Adeney (1920–2010), English flautist
- Walter Frederic Adeney (1849–1920), English biblical scholar

== See also ==
- Adney, variant spelling
- Edney, possible variant spelling
- Swaine Adeney Brigg
