= Cherrington =

Village in Shropshire, England

Coordinates: 52.776°N 2.497°W

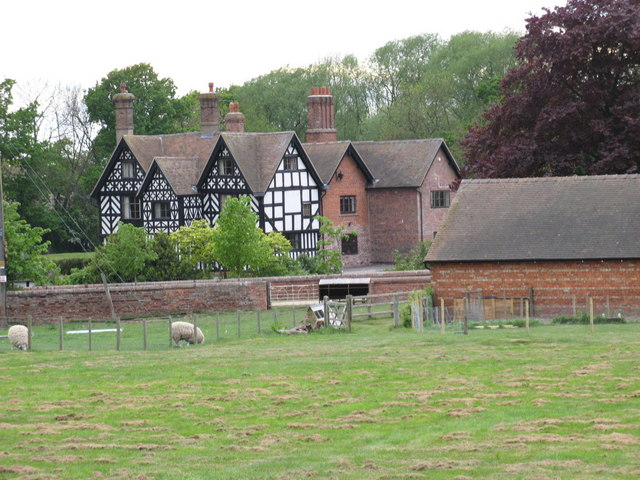
- Cherrington Manor

- Location within Shropshire
- OS grid reference: SJ664199
- Civil parish: Tibberton and Cherrington
- Unitary authority: Telford and Wrekin
- Ceremonial county: Shropshire
- Region: West Midlands
- Country: England
- Sovereign state: United Kingdom
- Post town: NEWPORT
- Postcode district: TF10
- Dialling code: 01952
- Police: West Mercia
- Fire: Shropshire
- Ambulance: West Midlands
- UK Parliament: The Wrekin

Cherrington is a village and former civil parish, now in the parish of Tibberton and Cherrington, in the Telford and Wrekin district, in the ceremonial county of Shropshire, England. It was recorded as a manor in the Domesday Book, when it was held by Gerard de Tournai, and was stated to have been held by a man named Uliet in the time of Edward the Confessor, although it was recorded as "waste", in an uncultivated state, by the time Gerard took possession of it. In 1961 the parish had a population of 122.

Cherrington is near to the larger village of Tibberton, to the east; Waters Upton is to the west and Great Bolas to the north-west. Newport is the nearest town. It contains several half-timbered buildings including Cherrington Manor, which dates from 1635 and was probably built for a landowner and Member of Parliament, Sir Richard Leveson of Lilleshall (1598-1661).

== History ==
Its name is possibly derived from the Old English personal name Ceorl, or it may have originally been "Ceorranton" from the name Ceorra ("the settlement of Ceorra's people").

Cherrington Manor (or in some versions, the malt-house standing behind it) was popularly supposed to have been the building referenced in the nursery rhyme This Is the House That Jack Built. The story is, however, a purely local attribution with no particular evidence to back it up.

Cherrington was formerly a township in the parish of Edgmond, from 1866 Cherrington was a civil parish in its own right, on 1 April 1988 the parish was abolished and merged with Tibberton to form "Tibberton & Cherrington".

== See also ==
- Listed buildings in Tibberton and Cherrington
