= Listed buildings in Eyton upon the Weald Moors =

Eyton upon the Weald Moors is a civil parish in the district of Telford and Wrekin, Shropshire, England. It contains twelve listed buildings that are recorded in the National Heritage List for England. Of these, one is at Grade II*, the middle of the three grades, and the others are at Grade II, the lowest grade. The parish contains the village of Eyton upon the Weald Moors, and is otherwise entirely rural. The Shrewsbury Canal, now disused, was built through the parish and joined its Newport Branch at Wappenshall Junction. A number of structures associated with the canal are listed, including a roving bridge, two warehouses, a toll office, and a lock keeper's cottage. The other listed buildings are houses and cottages, a farmhouse, a barn, a church, and a country house.

== Key ==
Grade	Criteria
II*	Particularly important buildings of more than special interest
II	Buildings of national importance and special interest

== Buildings ==
Name and location	Photograph	Date	Notes	Grade
Myddle Cottage; 52.72960°N 2.51776°W	—	17th century (probable)	A pair of timber framed cottages that were refaced in red brick in the 19th century. They have a tile roof, one storey and attics, and consist of a main range and a projecting gabled cross-wing on the left. The windows are casements, there are two dormers and two porches.	II
School House; 52.72883°N 2.51748°W		17th century	Originally a schoolmaster's house, later a private house, it is timber framed with brick infill and a tile roof. There is one storey and an attic, and two bays, the right bay gabled. The windows are windows, and there is a 19th-century brick extension to the right.	II
St Catherine's Church; 52.73004°N 2.51832°W		1743	The apse was added in 1850. The church is in Georgian style, built in red brick with dressings in red sandstone and with a tile roof. It consists of a three-bay nave, a polygonal apse, and a west tower, all with quoins. The tower has three stages, a west doorway with a circular window and a datestone above it, and at the top is a parapet and a pyramidal roof. The windows have round-arched heads and impost blocks and keyblocks.	II*
Eyton Hall Stables Farmhouse; 52.72744°N 2.51673°W	—	18th century	The farmhouse is in red brick with dentil eaves, and a tile roof with parapet gable ends. There are two storeys with attics, and three bays. The windows are mullioned and transomed with casements and segmental heads, and there are gabled dormers. The doorway has panelled pilasters, a frieze and a moulded hood.	II
Eyton House; 52.72992°N 2.51927°W		18th century	A red brick house with a tile roof, two storeys and an attic, and three bays. The windows are sashes with painted lintels, and there are three gabled dormers. On the front is a porch with Tuscan columns and an entablature.	II
Barn north-east of Eyton House; 52.73030°N 2.51854°W		18th century	A large barn in red brick with dentil eaves and a tile roof. It has two storeys, and extensions on the northeast side. In the ground floor are windows with segmental arches, and above are loft doors and ventilation holes.	II
Eyton Hall; 52.72756°N 2.51472°W	—	c. 1820	A stuccoed country house that was extended later in the 19th century. It has two storeys, five bays, and a hipped slate roof. The windows are sashes in moulded architraves. On the front is a Tuscan colonnade with a balcony above, and a pedimented doorway in the centre. Other features include two-storey canted bay windows, cornices, and parapets.	II
Lock Keeper's Cottage; 52.73226°N 2.51535°W		Early 19th century	The house was built for the Shrewsbury Canal, now disused. It is in red brick with a hipped slate roof, two storeys, four bays, and a rear wing. The windows are casements in round-arched recesses, those in the ground floor with segmental heads. In the third bay is a gabled porch, and above it is a lunette.	II
Canal bridge 52.72790°N 2.50104°W		1830–33	A roving bridge at Wappenshall Junction crossing the Newport Branch Canal close to its junction with the Shrewsbury Canal. It is in sandstone and consists of a single round arch with ashlar parapets.	II
Original canal warehouse 52.72785°N 2.50033°W		1834–35	The earlier warehouse at Wappenshall Junction is in red brick with a slate roof. There are two storeys and three bays, the central bay on each side being larger and deeply recessed. In the outer bays are windows with segmental heads.	II
Former canal toll clerk's office 52.72778°N 2.49968°W	—	1835	The office, later a private house, is in red brick with a slate roof. It has two storeys and three bays. In the centre of the north front is a two-story canted bay window with a hipped roof. The ground floor windows of the gable ends are in round arched recesses.	II
Covered canal dock warehouse 52.72783°N 2.50066°W		1836–38	The warehouse at Wappenshall Junction was built for goods to be transferred from the canal to the roads. It is in red brick with a slate roof, and has three storeys, the ground floor being arcaded over the canal. A cart road passes through the middle floor, and there are trap doors between the floors. The windows have round heads, and in the northeast gable end is a hoist above a two-storey hatch with a segmental arch.	II
