= Weald Moors =

Moors in Shropshire, England

Coordinates: 52.751°N 2.467°W

Weald Moors: Wildmoors
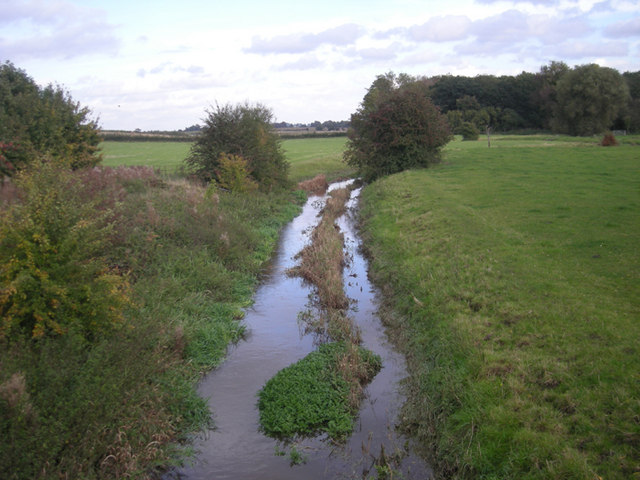
- The River Strine, here south of Cherrington, drains part of the Weald Moors.

- Location within Shropshire
- Unitary authority: Telford and Wrekin
- Ceremonial county: Shropshire
- Region: West Midlands
- Country: England
- Sovereign state: United Kingdom

The Weald Moors are located in the ceremonial county of Shropshire north of Telford, stretching from north and west of the town of Newport towards Wellington, with the village of Kynnersley lying roughly at their centre.

== Etymology ==
Although the Weald Moors are now largely agricultural land, they were among the last parts of the area to come into cultivation. The word weald (which elsewhere means open uplands or waste) in this context means "wild" or uncultivated: the "wild moors". A moor, in Shropshire usage, was a marsh. The spelling "Wildmore" or "Wyldemore" appears in documents from 1300 to 1586, and "Wildmoor" until well into the 19th century.

== History ==
The historic marsh or fenland character of the Weald Moors was formed after the last Ice Age, when the area was part of the glacial Lake Newport, connected to the larger Lake Lapworth. An underlying accumulation of peat led to the development of a large basin mire with waterlogged land: by the mediaeval period larger settlements had only developed on its edges, although an Iron Age marsh fort at Wall Camp is evidence that the defensible nature of the marshland was exploited by early inhabitants.

Under the mediaeval manorial system most of the area became classified as uncultivated "waste". Part of the Weald Moor, together with the Wrekin, seems to have for a time formed a royal forest known as Vasta Regalis, with Sir Humphrey de Eyton recorded as forest Warden in 1390; the old name was still remembered in a tract of land called "The Gales" as late as the 19th century.

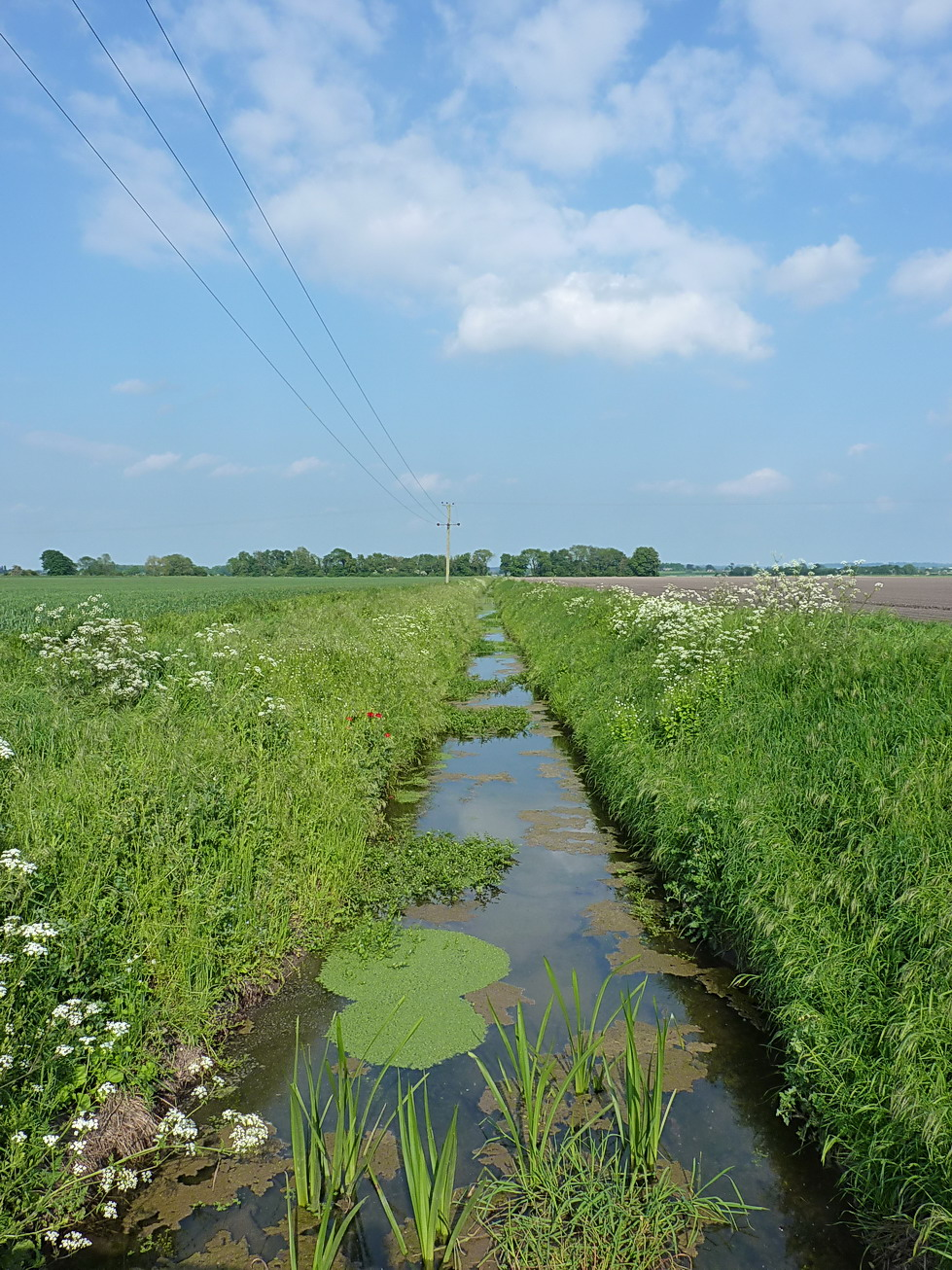
A drainage ditch on Eyton Moor, draining into the Hurley Brook.

Between the mid 16th and mid 17th centuries, there were a series of lawsuits as attempts were made to drain and enclose sections of the moor, leading to disputes over parish and township boundaries. For example, in 1583 Thomas Cherrington took a neighbouring landowner, Thurston Woodcock, to court alleging that Woodcock had employed "diverse desperate and lewd persons" to dig a drainage ditch across land claimed by Cherrington. Woodcock responded by arguing that the land was waste, and part of Meeson Moor. A good deal of land on the western side of the area was drained and enclosed by Sir Walter Leveson of Lilleshall, proprietor of the manor of Wrockwardine, in the late 16th century, and by the 1650s around 2700 acres of wetland had already been drained and enclosed. Peat digging was carried out on parts of the Moors, and the inhabitants of villages on the edge of the area, such as Wrockwardine, used some areas as summer pasture under historic rights of common. Wrockwardine's uniquely extensive common rights over the southern and western Weald Moors may have originated in its status as an 11th-century royal manor and administrative centre. By the 17th century the village was linked to the moors by a road whose verges had been enclosed for squatter's cottages, forming a separate settlement known as Long Lane.

A late 17th century parson of Kinnardsey (Kynnersley), the Rev. George Plaxton, wrote an account of the Weald Moors in 1673 in which he described much of it as still an impassable bog, and suggested that the entire area had until recently been a marsh other than those hamlets having the Anglo-Saxon word ey ("island") in their names. Plaxton was informed by elderly residents of the parish that the Moors had formerly been so overgrown with willow, alder and other marshland trees that they had customarily hung bells around the necks of their cattle to prevent losing them.

Salop. Inclosures and Drainage Act 1801
- Act of Parliament
- Parliament of the United Kingdom
- Long title: An Act for dividing, allotting, inclosing, draining, and improving several Common Moors, called Sydney Moor, Small Moor, Rodway Moor, Waters Upton Moor, and other Commons and Waste Lands within the several Parishes of Rockwardine, Eyton, Kinnersley, and Waters Upton, in the County of Salop, and within the several Townships of Crudgeington and Sleap, in the Parish of High Ercall, otherwise Ercall Magna, in the same County.
- Citation: 41 Geo. 3. (U.K.) c. lxxvii

Dates
- Royal assent: 20 June 1801

Text of statute as originally enacted

In 1801 an inclosure act, the Wildmoors Inclosure Act 1801 (41 Geo. 3. (U.K.) c. lxxvii), also known as the Salop. Inclosures and Drainage Act 1801, was passed, enabling local landowners (principally the Leveson-Gower family) to begin further drainage works. At this time the remaining marshland covered around 1,200 acres, with a further 600 acres of adjoining land left uncultivated: the majority was used as summer grazing by tenant farmers and in the winter was flooded and impassable. The works involved widening, straightening and embanking the existing strines, or brooks, and reversing the course of the old Preston Strine to eliminate seasonal flooding. Although as a result during the course of the early 19th century most of the area was reclaimed as farmland, some of the land remained suitable only as sheep pasture, being too boggy to bear cattle or grow other crops. Settlements remained small and scattered, and even now, the villages on the Moors are relatively small and isolated, although the northern suburbs of Telford are encroaching onto the area. The Weald Moors are still referenced in the names of the villages Eyton upon the Weald Moors and Preston upon the Weald Moors.

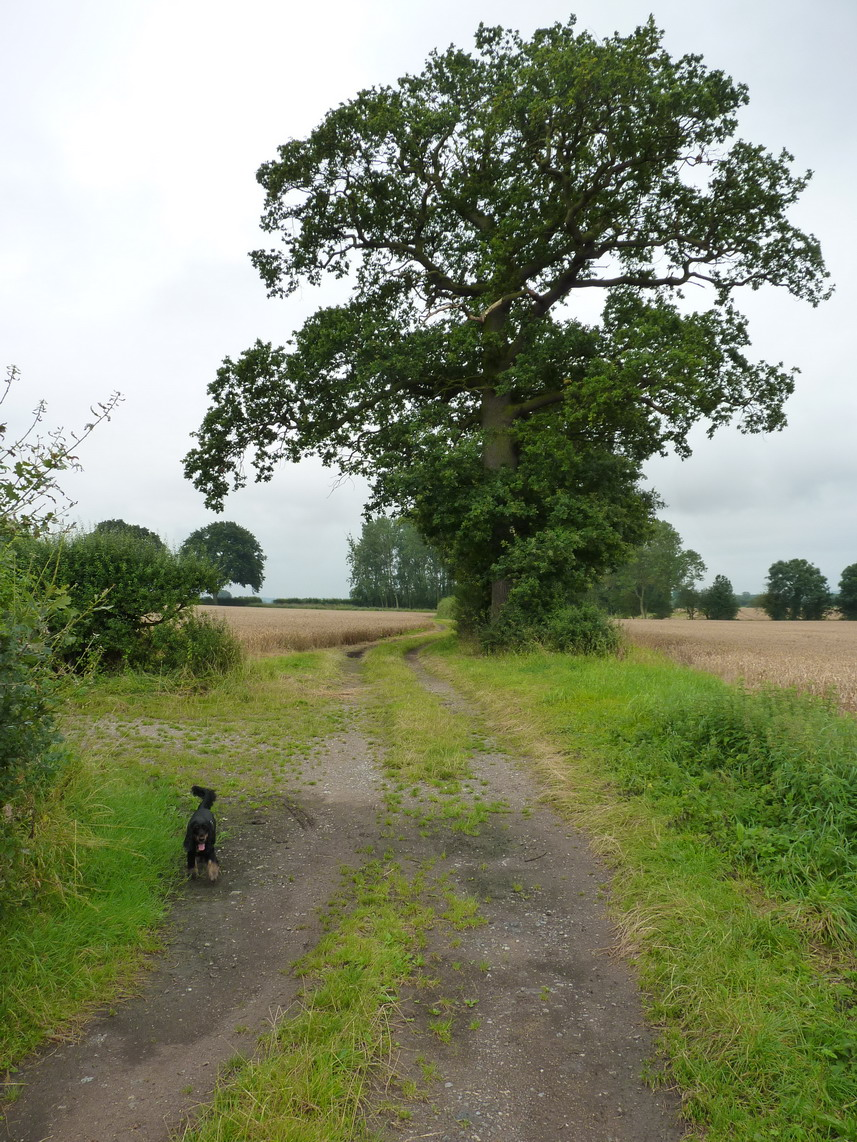
The Birch Moors, near the hamlet of Adeney.

Some parts of the moors are known by local names, such as the Tibberton and Cherrington Moors near the villages of the same name. Others are the Birch Moors around Adeney, the Rough or Preston Moors north of Preston, the Dayhouse Moor near Rodway, the Longford Moor west of Edgmond, and the Sleap Moor east of Crudgington.

The Shrewsbury Canal (a branch of the Shropshire Union Canal) was constructed across the area, but is today derelict.

== Wildlife ==
The farmland of the Weald Moors is a habitat for many birds which have now become rare elsewhere, such as the barn owl and Lapwing. In recent years there has been some reflooding and restoration of fenland habitat in the area of Kynnersley.
