= Preston upon the Weald Moors =

Coordinates: 52.733°N 2.471°W

- Village
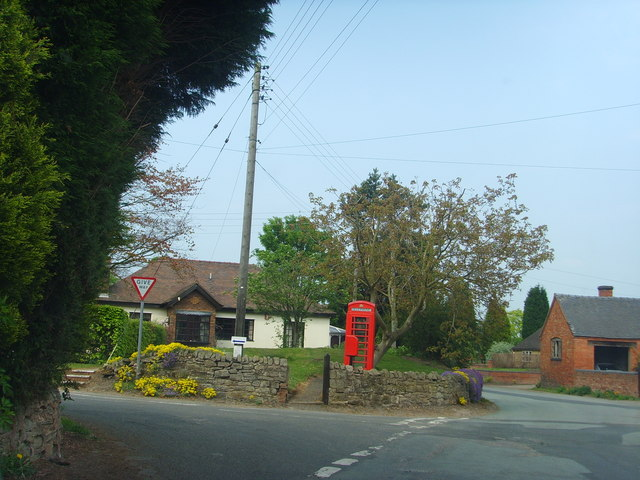
- Preston upon the Weald Moors

- Location within Shropshire
- Population: 204 (2021 Census)
- OS grid reference: SJ681151
- Civil parish: Preston upon the Weald Moors
- Unitary authority: Telford and Wrekin
- Ceremonial county: Shropshire
- Region: West Midlands
- Country: England
- Sovereign state: United Kingdom
- Post town: TELFORD
- Postcode district: TF6
- Dialling code: 01952
- Police: West Mercia
- Fire: Shropshire
- Ambulance: West Midlands
- UK Parliament: The Wrekin

Preston upon the Weald Moors is a village and civil parish in the borough of Telford and Wrekin in Shropshire, England. According to the 2021 census. the village had a population of 204. It is one of a number of villages that exist on the Weald Moors of Shropshire.

The name Preston upon the Weald Moors (24 letters) is said to be the longest name of any village in England and is thought to have derived from the words priest and tun (meaning, enclosure, farmstead or homestead) indicating that the village may well have ecclesiastical origins.

== Notable buildings ==
=== Preston Hospital ===
Locally known as Preston Trust homes, Preston Hospital is one of twelve Grade I listed buildings in Telford. The former Alms house was converted into upmarket apartments and houses around 2005. It was founded in 1716 by the will of Lady Catherine Herbert the daughter of the 1st Earl of Bradford. It was left as a bequest for her brother Lord Torrington to build an Almshouse in Shropshire for 12 women and 12 girls as thanksgiving for her rescue when lost in the Alps. Additional funding was provided by Lord Mountrath in 1802.

=== St. Lawrence Church ===
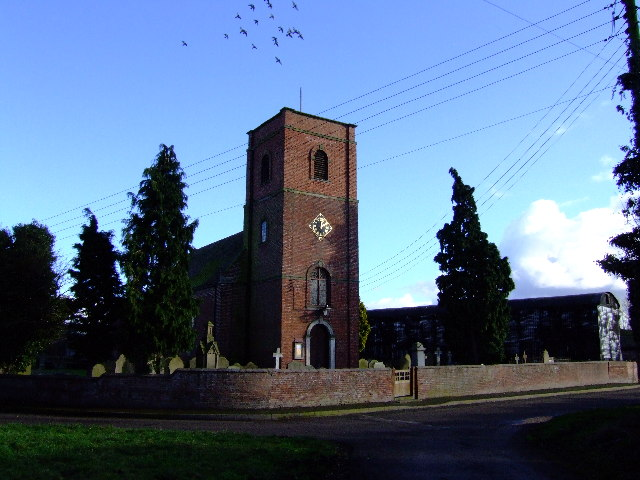
St. Lawrence Church

The main body of the current church of St. Lawrence in Preston was built to replace the former church between 1739 and 1742 with the keystone above the main doorway dated 1739. The chancel and vestry were added in 1853. It is a Grade II listed building.

=== St Lawrence C of E Primary School ===
St Lawrence C of E Primary School was opened in 1898. It was built on land donated by the trustees of Preston Hospital to replace an earlier school. It currently has three classes with a total of 83 pupils an improvement on the mid-1980s when the school was threatened with closure with only 29 pupils.

=== Canal ===
The Newport Branch of the Birmingham and Liverpool Junction Canal ran along the North of the village. It was in use until the 1940s when it was partially filled in. The traditional humpback canal bridge remained in place on the road north out of the village until August 1985 when an experimental destructive load test was conducted into the strength of these bridge. The bridge was demolished by the test. All that remains is the canal turning bowl which can still be seen in the north east of the village. More substantial remains can be found at Wappenshall Junction a small hamlet approximately a mile to the west.

== See also ==
- Preston upon the Weald Moors
