= Child's Ercall =

Village and civil parish in Shropshire, England

Coordinates: 52.822°N 2.495°W

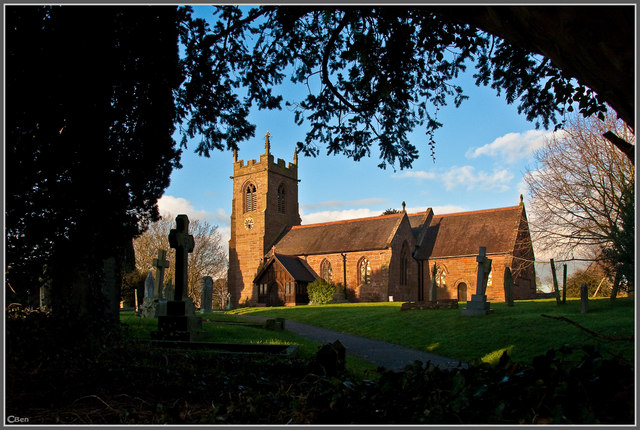
- St Michael's Church, Child's Ercall

- Location within Shropshire
- Population: 732 (2011)
- OS grid reference: SJ667251
- Civil parish: Child's Ercall
- Unitary authority: Shropshire
- Ceremonial county: Shropshire
- Region: West Midlands
- Country: England
- Sovereign state: United Kingdom
- Post town: Market Drayton
- Postcode district: TF9
- Dialling code: 01952
- Police: West Mercia
- Fire: Shropshire
- Ambulance: West Midlands
- UK Parliament: North Shropshire

Child's Ercall (/ɑːrkəl/ AR-kəl) is a village and civil parish in Shropshire, England. It is located in a rural area between the towns of Market Drayton and Newport: the civil parish had a total population of 599 at the 2001 census, rising to 732 at the 2011 Census. The closest neighbouring village is Ollerton, around 1 mile to the west.

== Etymology ==
The second part of its name, recorded in the forms "Archelou" and "Erkalwe" in the 13th century, has been suggested as derived from a Celtic word, perhaps an old Welsh name Ercal. An Old English root based on the name of a hill, ear "gravel" plus the adjective calu(w) "bare", has also been proposed. The affix "child" may come from its mediaeval sense, meaning "knight". A possible etymology suggested by the toponymist Margaret Gelling, is that Child's Ercall was named as it belonged to a younger member of the Strange family, who owned much of the area in the mediaeval period.

== Church ==
The village church has a 12th-century doorway, a 13th-century arcade and 14th-century aisle, as well as stained glass by Charles Eamer Kempe. It contains a brass war memorial plaque to local men who died serving in both World Wars, and another to Staff Sergeant Ronald Beckett who was killed on bomb disposal work in Northern Ireland in 1973.

== Sport ==
Child's Ercall Football Club is a member of the Mercian Regional League (that covers most of Shropshire) and they play their home games in the village at Jubilee Hall.

== Airfield ==
The former RAF Peplow is nearby.

== See also ==
- Listed buildings in Child's Ercall
