= Kynnersley =

Village in Shropshire, England

Coordinates: 52.747°N 2.484°W

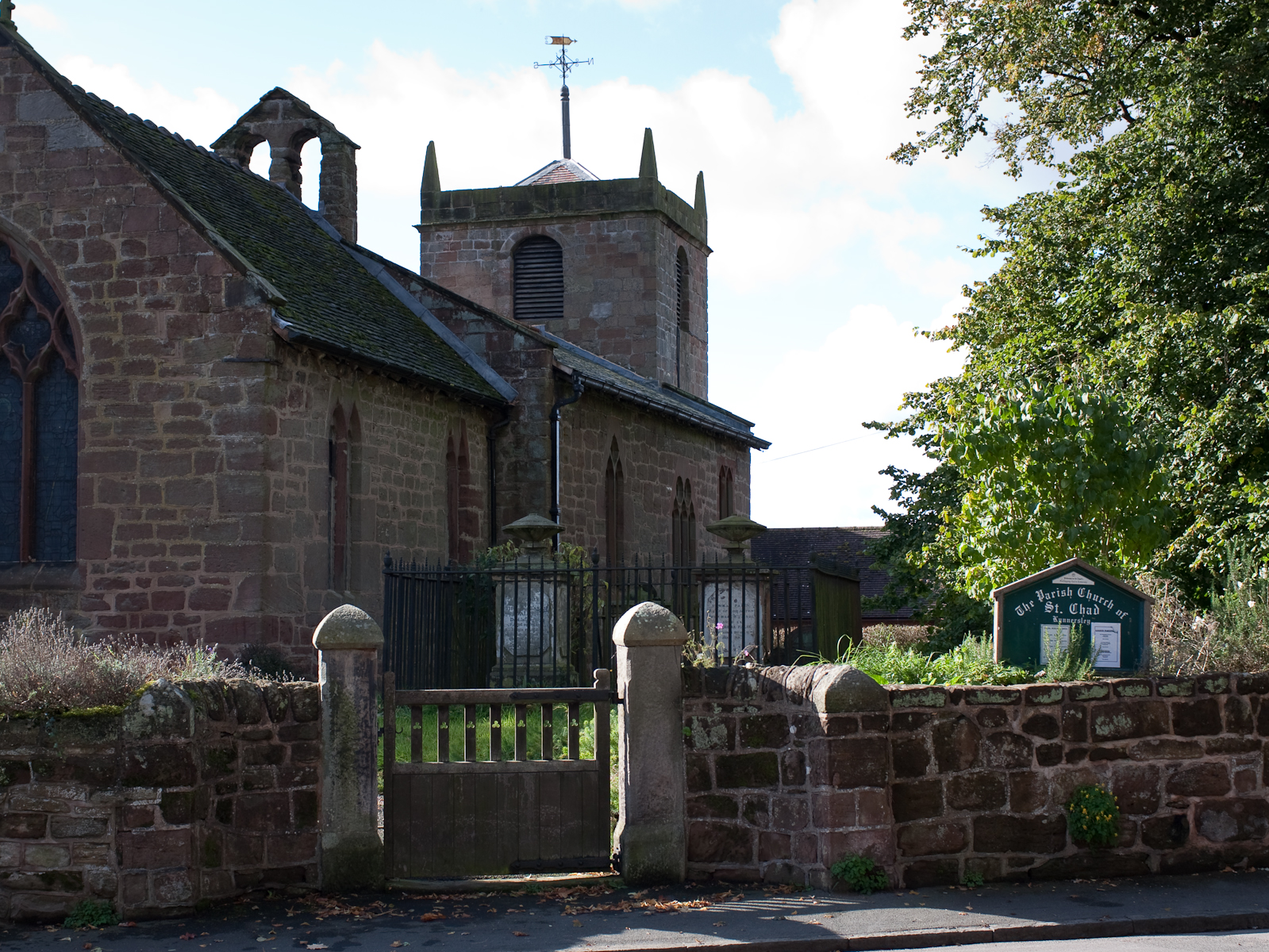
- Kynnersley church

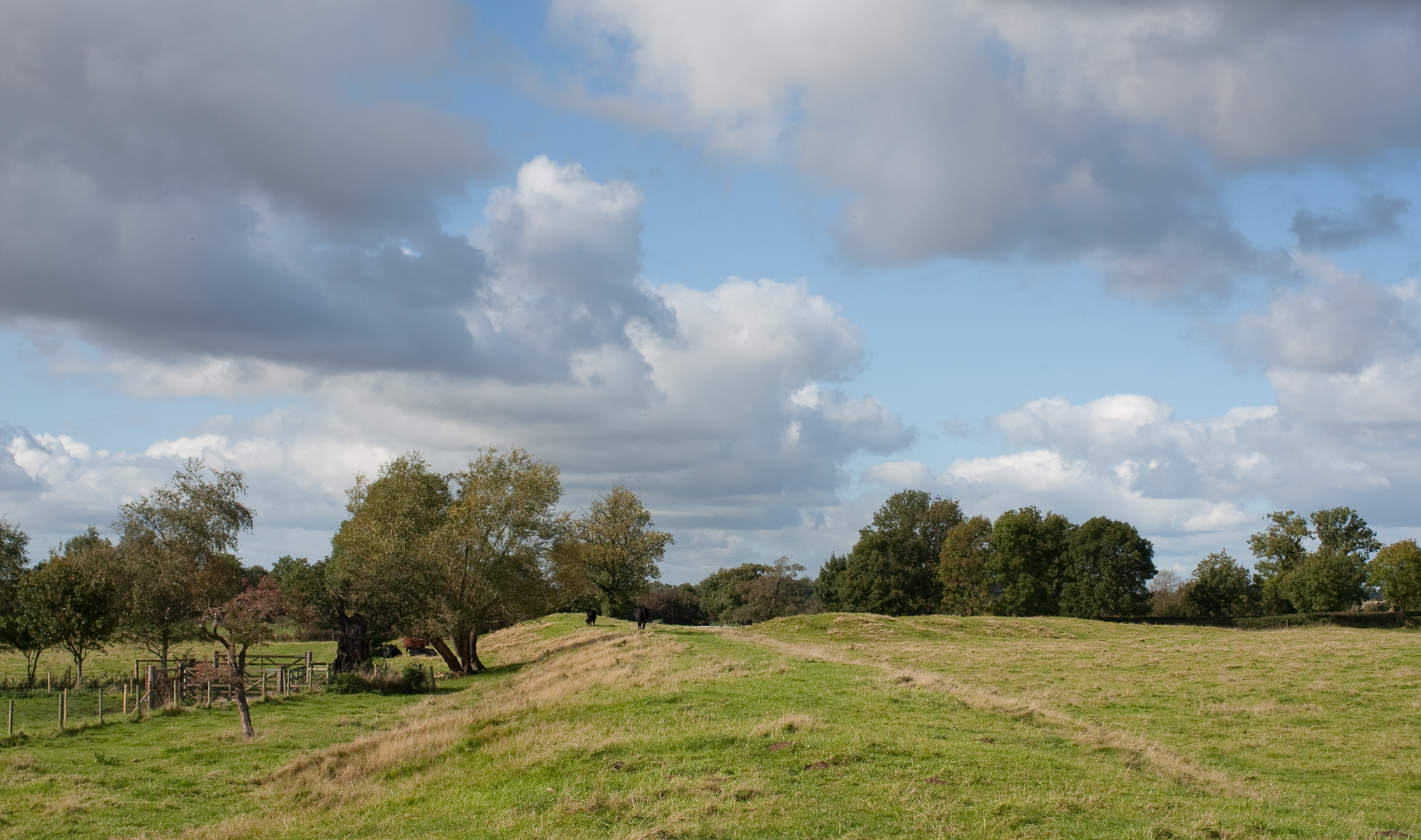
- Kynnersley wall

- Location within Shropshire
- Population: 284 (2011.Civil Parish)
- OS grid reference: SJ672167
- Civil parish: Kynnersley
- Unitary authority: Telford and Wrekin
- Ceremonial county: Shropshire
- Region: West Midlands
- Country: England
- Sovereign state: United Kingdom
- Post town: TELFORD
- Postcode district: TF6
- Dialling code: 01952
- Police: West Mercia
- Fire: Shropshire
- Ambulance: West Midlands
- UK Parliament: The Wrekin

Kynnersley is a village in Shropshire, England.

Kynnersley lies in the borough of Telford and Wrekin, in a remote, rural location north of Telford. The village has a population of approximately 180 based on the 2001 census and taking into account new housing, increasing to 284 at the 2011 census. The population is expected to grow slightly as further new developments take place especially as former farm buildings are converted to residential use.

Kynnersley has a small Church of England church, parts of which date from the 13th Century, surmounted by an unusual central bell tower. There is a small village hall of wooden construction which was probably once part of a military barracks (on another site). The village also contains a set of water pumps, still in situ but now out of service, that provided water from an underground pipe system fed from a wind pump. The oldest house in the village is the (Grade II listed) Whym Cottage, a beamed house with walls of wattle and daub, part of which dates from the 16th century.

Kynnersley is situated on the North Shropshire Weald Moors, an area of wetlands which have been drained for agricultural use using a series of drains or "strines". Most of the farming land was originally part of the estate of the Duke of Sutherland and several houses in the village are 'Duke of Sutherland Cottages' which have a distinctive architectural style. The "Dukes Drive" is a lane that leads directly from Kynnersley to the Duke of Sutherland memorial at Lilleshall

In the centre of the village is a small triangle of raised land known as the Whim. The oak tree in the middle of the Whim is said to have been the hanging tree for the local court house. The old court house itself is now part of the farm buildings of Manor Farm and is in a poor state of repair.

== Notable people ==
- Robert Burn (1829–1904), classical scholar and archaeologist, born at Kynnersley when his father was rector of the parish.
- Chris Boot (born 1960), photographer and book publisher, born at Kynnersley.

== See also ==
- Listed buildings in Kynnersley

== Sources ==
- "Burn, Robert (BN848R)". A Cambridge Alumni Database. University of Cambridge.
- Raven, Michael, 'A Guide to Shropshire', Michael Raven, 2005, 0906114349.
