= Listed buildings in Child's Ercall =

Child's Ercall is a civil parish in Shropshire, England. It contains nine listed buildings that are recorded in the National Heritage List for England. Of these, one is listed at Grade II*, the middle of the three grades, and the others are at Grade II, the lowest grade. The parish contains the villages of Child's Ercall and Tibberton, and is otherwise rural. The listed buildings consist of a church and items in the churchyard, houses, farmhouses, farm buildings, and a bridge.

== Key ==
Grade	Criteria
II*	Particularly important buildings of more than special interest
II	Buildings of national importance and special interest

== Buildings ==
Name and location	Photograph	Date	Notes	Grade
St Michael's Church; 52.82231°N 2.49764°W		13th century	Alterations were carried out in the 14th century, the tower was built in the 15th century, and in 1879 Ingelow and Carpenter carried out a restoration, rebuilt parts of the church, and added a vestry and a porch. The church is built in sandstone with tile roofs, and consists of a nave, north and south aisles under separate roofs, a south porch, a chancel with a north vestry, and a tower at the west end of the south aisle. The tower has two stages, diagonal buttresses, a clock face on the south side, and a moulded embattled parapet with gargoyles and crocketed corner pinnacles. In the south side of the church is a re-set Norman doorway.	II*
The Lea Gates; 52.83594°N 2.49356°W	—	c. 1600 (probable)	A cottage, later used for other purposes, it is timber framed with red brick nogging and a corrugated iron roof. The right gable end has been rebuilt in sandstone, probably in the 18th century. It has one storey and an attic, and at the right is a lean-to extension.	II
Bridge over River Meese; 52.78090°N 2.47419°W	—	18th century	The bridge carries a road over the River Meese. It is in sandstone and has been widened on the east side in brick. The bridge consists of two segmental arches, with a cutwater and a parapet.	II
Dodecote Grange; 52.80664°N 2.48360°W	—	Mid to late 18th century	A farmhouse in red brick on a plinth, with a dentil eaves cornice and a hipped slate roof. It has two storeys and an attic, and a complex U-shaped plan. The garden front has three bays, a single-bay extension with a parapet to the right, a further two-storey extension with a hipped roof, and there is also a lean-to addition. Most of the windows are casements, there are two French windows, and there are eaves dormers with horizontally-sliding sash windows.	II
Sundial; 52.82215°N 2.49763°W	—	1773	The sundial is in the churchyard of St Michael's Church. It is in red sandstone, and consists of a pair of circular steps, a chamfered circular base, a tapered shaft with a square base and an octagonal neck, and a square dial inscribed plate with a gnomon.	II
Wood Farmhouse; 52.78681°N 2.45883°W	—	c. 1800	A red brick house with a two-span tile roof and two parallel ranges. The front range has three storeys and a basement and five bays, and the rear range has two storeys and an attic and three bays. The central doorway has panelled pilaster strips, a frieze, a cornice, and a rectangular fanlight, and the windows are sashes.	II
Barn, Wood Farm; 52.78713°N 2.45968°W	—	c. 1800	The barn is in red brick with a dentil eaves cornice, and a tile roof with crowstepped parapeted gable ends and corbelled coping. The windows, doorways and loft doors have segmental heads, and there are cruciform and lozenge-shaped ventilation holes. At the rear is a range of cow houses.	II
Stables and cartshed, Wood Farm; 52.78705°N 2.45944°W	—	c. 1800	The farm buildings are in red brick with a dentil eaves cornice, and have a tile roof with crowstepped parapeted gable ends and corbelled coping. There are two storeys and a front of five bays. The windows, doorway and cart openings have segmental heads, and there are brick piers with rounded coping and stone plinths. In the left gable end are ventilation holes.	II
Manby and Topham memorial 52.82235°N 2.49752°W	—	1837	The memorial to members of the Topham family is in the churchyard of St Michael's Church. It is a pedestal tomb in grey sandstone, and has recessed rectangular side panels with reeded architraves and corner paterae, a fluted frieze, a moulded cornice, and a stepped top with an urn finial.	II
