= Listed buildings in Kynnersley =

Kynnersley is a civil parish in the district of Telford and Wrekin, Shropshire, England. It contains three listed buildings that are recorded in the National Heritage List for England. Of these, one is at Grade II*, the middle of the three grades, and the others are at Grade II, the lowest grade. The parish contains the village of Kynnersley and the surrounding countryside. All the listed buildings are in the centre of the village, and consist of a medieval church, a timber framed cottage, and a brick house.

== Key ==
Grade	Criteria
II*	Particularly important buildings of more than special interest
II	Buildings of national importance and special interest

== Buildings ==
Name and location	Photograph	Date	Notes	Grade
St Chad's Church; 52.74697°N 2.48627°W		c. 1320–30	The tower was added in 1722–23, the church was restored in the 19th century, and the porch is dated 1884. The church is built in sandstone, and consists of a nave, a south porch, a chancel, and a west tower. The tower has two stages and a plain parapet with obelisk pinnacles on the corners. On the junction of the nave and the chancel is a double bellcote. All the windows are the result of the restoration.	II*
Whym Cottage; 52.74735°N 2.48573°W		17th century	The cottage was extended in the 18th century with the addition of a rear wing. The original part is timber framed with painted infill panels, the rear wing is in brick, and the roof is tiled. There is one storey with an attic, the windows are casements, on the front is a gabled porch, and there is one gabled dormer. The rear wing has a crow-stepped gable.	II
Kynnersley House Farmhouse; 52.74669°N 2.48561°W	—	Late 18th century	A red brick house with a tile roof, two storeys and attics, and three bays. In the ground floor is a porch and bay windows, in the upper floor are sash windows with segmental heads and keystones, and there are three gabled dormers.	II
