= Listed buildings in Tibberton and Cherrington =

Tibberton and Cherrington is a civil parish in the district of Telford and Wrekin, Shropshire, England. It contains 16 listed buildings that are recorded in the National Heritage List for England. Of these, one is at Grade II*, the middle of the three grades, and the others are at Grade II, the lowest grade. The parish contains the villages of Tibberton and Cherrington, and is otherwise rural. Almost all the listed buildings are timber framed houses and cottages, the earlier ones with cruck construction. The other listed buildings consist of red brick houses and a church.

== Key ==
Grade	Criteria
II*	Particularly important buildings of more than special interest
II	Buildings of national importance and special interest

== Buildings ==
Name and location	Photograph	Date	Notes	Grade
Cruck Cottage; 52.78031°N 2.49280°W		16th century	A timber framed cottage with cruck construction and painted brick infill on a sandstone plinth, and with a thatched roof. There is one storey and an attic, and three bays, and the cottage contains three pairs of cruck trusses. The windows are casements, and there are three eyebrow dormers.	II
Tibberton House; 52.77857°N 2.47212°W	—	1611	A timber framed cottage with plastered infill and a tile roof. There is one storey and an attic, and three bays. On the front is a gabled porch, and the windows are casements. There are three large dormers with oversailing gables, the right gable is on shaped brackets, and is dated.	II
7 Stackyard Lane; 52.78040°N 2.49199°W	—	Early 17th century (probable)	A timber framed cottage with cruck trusses, red brick infill, and an asbestos tile roof. There is one storey and an attic, and three bays. The windows are casements, and there is a gabled dormer.	II
Longacre; 52.77983°N 2.49346°W	—	Early 17th century (probable)	A timber framed cottage with cruck construction that has been restored. It has plastered infill, the northeast end is in painted sandstone, and the tile roof is gabled and hipped. There is one storey and an attic, and three bays. The windows are casements, and there are two gabled dormers.	II
Cherrington Manor House; 52.77793°N 2.49662°W		1635	A timber framed house with painted brick infill and a tile roof. There are two storeys and an attic, and three gabled bays, the centre bay a two-storey projecting porch. At the rear are 19th-century extensions. The upper storeys and the gables are jettied with moulded bressumers, and the gables have bargeboards and pendants. The doorway has a rectangular fanlight, the windows are casements, and under the upper floor windows are carved blank arches.	II*
5 and 6 The Green; 52.78153°N 2.49159°W	—	17th century	A pair of timber framed cottages, refronted in red brick and partly rendered, with exposed timber framing at the rear, and a tile roof. There is one storey and attics, and four bays. The windows are casements, and there are four gabled dormers.	II
7 Tibberton; 52.77689°N 2.46699°W	—	17th century	A restored and extended timber framed cottage, with brick infill, the extension in brick, and a tile roof. There is one storey and an attic, and three bays. On the front is a gabled porch, the windows are three-light casements, and there are three gabled dormers.	II
12 Tibberton; 52.77670°N 2.46894°W	—	17th century	A timber framed house with painted brick infill and a tile roof. There is one storey and attics, a front of five bays, and to the right is a 19th-century gabled wing with a porch in the angle. The windows are casements, and there are three gabled dormers.	II
Cherrington Grange; 52.78115°N 2.48974°W	—	17th century	A timber framed house, later encased in brick and painted. It has a dentilled eaves course, a tiled roof, one storey and an attic, two bays, and a 19th-century rear wing. In the centre is a porch, and a doorway with pilasters and an entablature. The windows are casements with segmental heads, and there are two gabled dormers.	II
Peartree Cottage; 52.78138°N 2.49134°W	—	17th century	A timber framed cottage with later extensions in sandstone, it has painted brick infill and a tile roof. There is one storey and an attic, two bays, an 18th-century one-bay extension to the leaf and a later extension to the right. The windows are casements.	II
Rose Farmhouse; 52.77802°N 2.47055°W	—	17th century	A timber framed farmhouse that was altered in the 19th century. It has plastered infill, a tile roof, two storeys, two bays, and a lean-to at each end. In the centre is a timber porch, and the windows are casements.	II
Sutherland Forge; 52.77966°N 2.47203°W	—	17th century	A timber framed house with painted plaster infill and a tile roof. There is one storey and an attic, two bays, and later extensions. On the front is a gable porch, the windows are casements, and there are two large dormers with oversailing gables.	II
Tibberton Manor House; 52.77451°N 2.45836°W		1796	A red brick house with a tile roof, three storeys and three bays. In the ground floor is a gabled porch flanked by bay windows, the upper floors contain sashes, and above the middle window in the central bay is a tablet with a coronet and the date.	II
Tibberton Grange; 52.76698°N 2.46954°W	—	1810	A red brick house with a slate roof, three storeys, three bays, and flanking recessed two-storey one-bay pavilions. In the centre is a porch with pairs of openwork iron columns, and a doorway with pilasters and a semicircular fanlight. The windows are sashes, those in the ground floor under white rendered lunettes.	II
Day House; 52.76888°N 2.50500°W	—	1819	A farmhouse on a model farm, it is in red brick, and has a tile roof with coped gables and moulded kneelers. There are two storeys and three bays. In the centre is a porch with pilasters, a pediment and an elliptical arch, and the doorway has a semicircular fanlight. Flanking the porch are canted bay windows, in the upper floor are sash windows with stone lintels, and above the middle window is a plaque with a coronet and the date.	II
All Saints Church; 52.78030°N 2.47387°W		1842	The church is in sandstone, and consists of a nave, a south transept, a square chancel, and a west tower. The tower has clock faces, and an embattled parapet with pinnacles. The windows have pointed arches and contain Y-tracery.	II
