= River Strine =

River in Shropshire, England

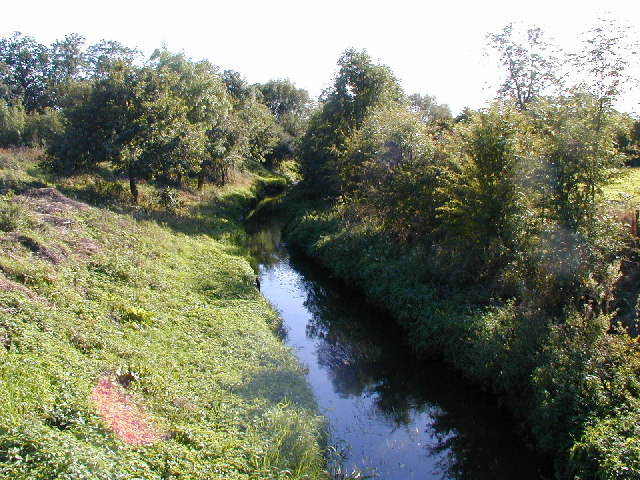
- Strine near Crudgington

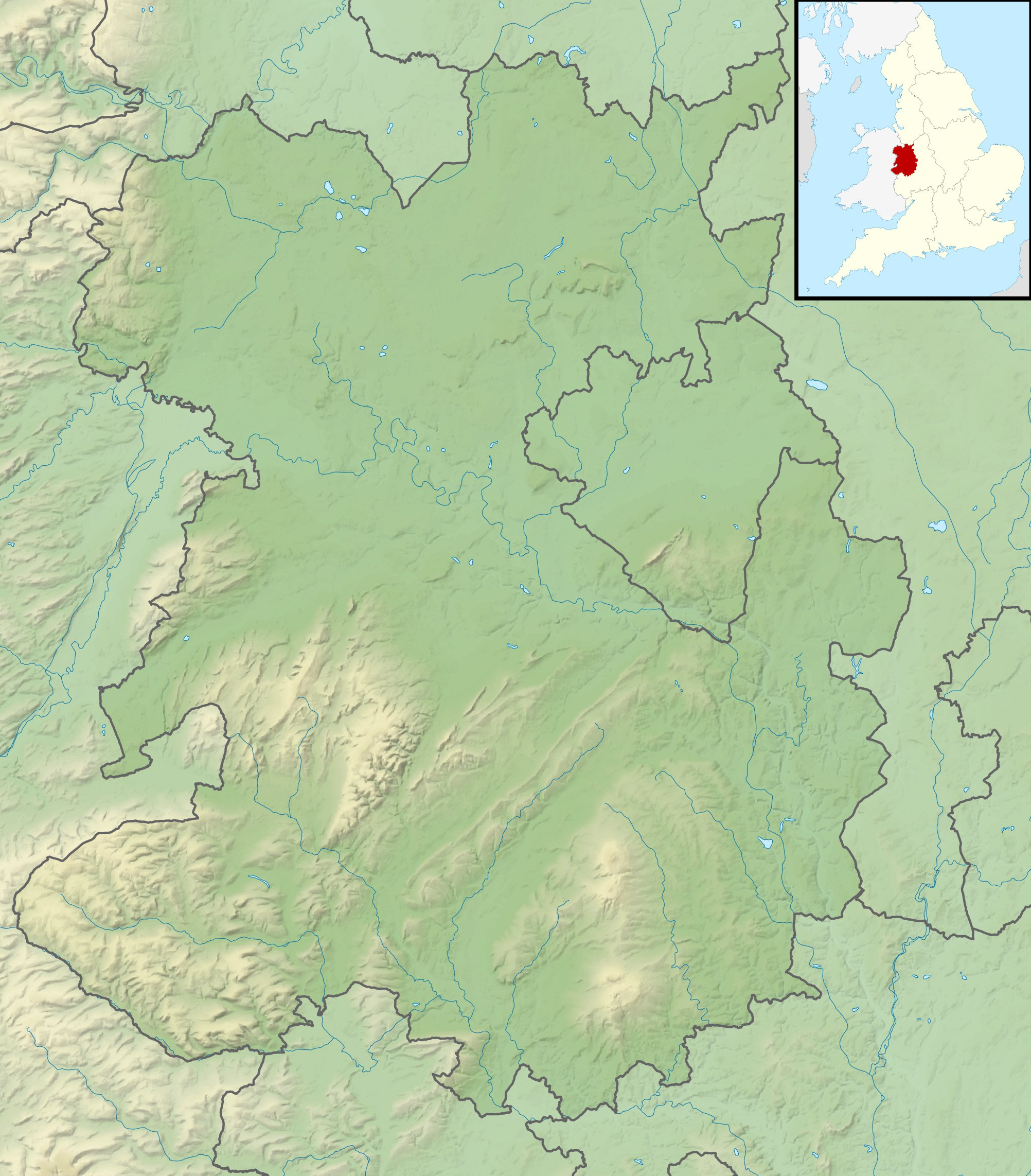
- Location of the mouth within Shropshire

Location
- Country: England
- County: Shropshire

Physical characteristics
- Mouth
  - location: River Tern
  - coordinates: 52.7547°N 2.5512°W
- Length: 5.4 km (3.4 mi)
- Discharge
  - location: Crudgington
  - average: 0.67 m^{3}/s (24 cu ft/s)

The River Strine is a 3.4-mile-long (5.4 km) tributary of the River Tern flowing through the Telford and Wrekin district of Shropshire in England. The river drains the Weald Moors a fenland area north of Telford, and also takes runoff from Newport and Lilleshall. Tributaries of the Strine include the Pipe Strine, Red Strine, and Wall Brook.

== Course ==
The river is formed by the confluence of the Pipe Strine and the Wall Brook. It flows through Cherrington Moor, and past the hamlet of Rodway, and then through Dayhouse and Crudgington Moor, where it is joined by the Commission Drain or Red Strine. Beyond this point it passes the village of Crudgington, where it is bridged by the A442, it then joins the Tern.

== Hydrology ==
The flow of the river was measured at an electromagnetic gauging station in its lower reaches at Crudgington between 1982 and 2009. The catchment to the station yielded an average flow of 0.67 cubic metres per second (24 cu ft/s).

== See also ==
- List of rivers of England
