= Isombridge =

Hamlet in Shropshire, England

Coordinates: 52.720°N 2.577°W

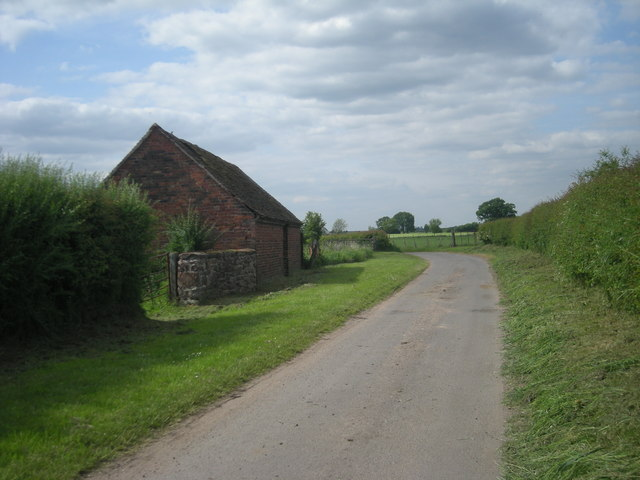

- Location within Shropshire
- OS grid reference: SJ609138
- Civil parish: Rodington
- Unitary authority: Telford and Wrekin
- Ceremonial county: Shropshire
- Region: West Midlands
- Country: England
- Sovereign state: United Kingdom
- Post town: TELFORD
- Postcode district: TF6
- Dialling code: 01952
- Police: West Mercia
- Fire: Shropshire
- Ambulance: West Midlands
- UK Parliament: The Wrekin

Isombridge is a small hamlet in rural Shropshire. It lies on the border of the civil parishes of Wrockwardine and Rodington, north of Wrockwardine village, near the River Tern. Population details are included under Rodington. Immediately to the north is another small hamlet, Marsh Green, which was formerly on the Shrewsbury Canal until the latter's closure.

It was recorded as a manor in the Domesday Book, where its name was written Asnebruge. This was derived from the Old English esne, "servant", and bryce, "bridge": "the bridge of the servants", presumably referring to a bridge over the Tern. The manor, which had been held by a man named Ulf in Saxon times, was later held by Ralph de Mortimer: he subsequently forfeited it and it passed to the lords of Bolas.

The area later formed a township of the parish of High Ercall: there was a small chapel here, now long since disappeared.
