= Edney =

Edney is a surname, possibly an English locative name from Adeney, which has been spread to North America and Australasia. Notable people with the surname include:

- Beatrice Edney (born 1962), English actress
- Dennis Edney (born 1946, died 2023), Scottish-Canadian defense attorney
- James Edney (born 1870, died 1951), English bowls player
- June Elizabeth Edney (born 1956), English cricketer
- Leon Albert Edney (born 1935), American admiral
- Samuel Edney (born 1984), Canadian luger
- Sarah Edney (born 1993), Canadian ice hockey player
- Philip 'Spike' Edney (born 1951), English musician
- Tyus Dwayne Edney Sr. (born 1973), American basketball player and coach

== See also ==
- Adney, possible variant spelling
- Adeney, possible variant spelling
- Edneyville, North Carolina, named after early settlers, brothers Samuel and Asa Edney
