= Adney Helicopter =

Australian homebuilt helicopter

- Rear quarter view of the Adney Helicopter

General information
- Type: Homebuilt helicopter
- National origin: Australia
- Manufacturer: Eric Adney
- Number built: 1

History
- First flight: 1948

The Adney Helicopter was an Australian helicopter designed, built, and flown by Eric Adney in the late 1940s. It is thought to have been the first helicopter built in Australia and also the first to have flown in Australia.

== Design and development ==
Adney, a bookkeeper, was living in the Melbourne suburb of Black Rock in the 1940s, when he commenced the design and construction of a lightweight single-seat helicopter.

It featured a single main rotor, a belt-driven tail rotor, a single-seat open cockpit, and a tricycle landing gear.

The main member of the airframe is a wooden spar, hollowed out with lightening holes, with the rest of the airframe being bolted onto that. The majority of the helicopter was constructed using aluminium sheets and tubing, and appears to have been built using hand-tools. The various components of the airframe are connected either by bolts or rivets, with nothing being welded.

The engine, a second-hand JAP motorcycle twin-cylinder, is at the front of the airframe. A vertical pylon is located immediately behind that and contains the rotor shaft. The pilot sits immediately behind the pylon, facing towards it. A two-stage belt drive runs underneath the pilot's seat and along a tail boom to power the tail rotor. The helicopter has a tricycle undercarriage with the two main wheels having wishbone suspension.

Both the main rotor and tail rotor blades are wooden. The main rotor has collective pitch control but no cyclic pitch control. It's thought that the helicopter was intended to mainly achieve hovering flight, and that directional control would be achieved by the shifting of the pilot's weight.

== Operational history ==
Construction was thought to have taken two years, with the first flight taking place in 1948. Neighbours later reported that on a number of occasions the helicopter was able to rise "above roof level". One neighbour, Edgar South, commented that he'd witnessed Adney in 1956 making a tethered flight in the helicopter. The helicopter was not registered, and Adney was not a licensed pilot.

== Discovery ==
After Adney's death, the helicopter was passed onto a neighbour, who then on-sold it. The aircraft was unknown to the Australian aviation community, till 2017 when Ian Drysdale happened across it while visiting an associate's motorcycle collection, and posted an article to the Redback Aviation website, detailing the craft.

== Specifications ==
Data from Redneck Aviation

General characteristics

- Crew: 1
- Empty weight: 61 kg (135 lb)
- Powerplant: 1 × JAP 2-cylinder air-cooled motorcycle engine, 15 kW (20 hp)
- Main rotor diameter: 4.3 m (14 ft)
- Main rotor area: 14.3 m^{2} (154 sq ft)
- Tail rotor diameter: 1 ft 10 in (0.6 m)

Performance
