= Eyton upon the Weald Moors =

Village in Shropshire, England

Coordinates: 52.728°N 2.516°W

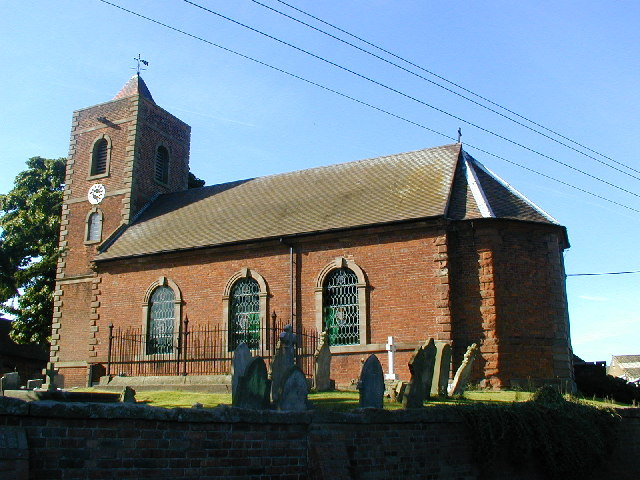
- St Catherine's Church, Eyton

- Location within Shropshire
- OS grid reference: SJ651146
- Civil parish: Eyton upon the Weald Moors
- Unitary authority: Telford and Wrekin
- Ceremonial county: Shropshire
- Region: West Midlands
- Country: England
- Sovereign state: United Kingdom
- Post town: TELFORD
- Postcode district: TF6
- Dialling code: 01952
- Police: West Mercia
- Fire: Shropshire
- Ambulance: West Midlands
- UK Parliament: The Wrekin

Eyton is a village and civil parish in Shropshire, England on the south-west edge of the Weald Moors, north of Wellington.

The naturalist Thomas Campbell Eyton (1809–1880) was born at Eyton Hall and owned the Eyton estate from when he succeeded to it in 1855. The estate has a snowdrop walk within its woodlands.

== See also ==
- Listed buildings in Eyton upon the Weald Moors
