= Wappenshall Junction =

Canal junction in Shropshire, England

Coordinates: 52.7278°N 2.5014°W

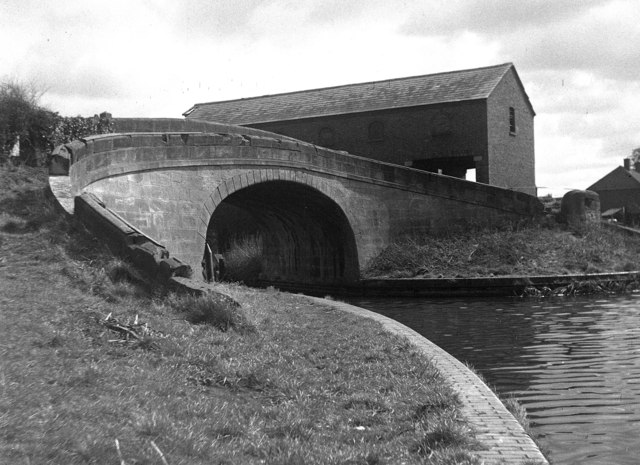
- The junction in 1964. The route to Newport is through the bridge, the Trench Branch is to the upper right, and Shrewsbury to the left.
- Interactive map of Wappenshall Junction

Specifications
- Status: Closed

History
- Date completed: 1835
- Date closed: 1944

Wappenshall Junction (grid reference SJ662145) is a British canal junction located at Wappenshall, Shropshire. It was created when the Newport Branch Canal joined the Shrewsbury Canal in 1835, and was closed along with the canal in 1944.

== History ==
The Shrewsbury Canal was authorised by an Act of Parliament in 1793, and was to run from the town of Shrewsbury to the Wombridge Canal, most of which was bought by the new canal company, to secure a link to the Donnington Wood Canal and the supplies of coal which were available there. The canal was level from Shrewsbury to Eyton, a little to the west of Wappenshall, where there were two locks. To the south-east of Wappenshall, it ascended through nine locks and then up an inclined plane at Trench, to reach the Wombridge Canal which was 75 feet (23 m) above the level of the canal at that point. It was opened in February 1797, as was suitable for tub-boats, which were 6.5 feet (2.0 m) wide, and nearly all the traffic through Wappenshall was coal towards Shrewsbury, with empty boats passing in the reverse direction.

The canal, which was part of the East Shropshire network, remained isolated from the rest of the British canal system. In 1825, the Birmingham and Liverpool Junction Canal was authorised, to run from the Ellesmere and Chester Canal at Nantwich to Autherley Junction near Wolverhampton on the Staffordshire and Worcestershire Canal. Two years later, that canal company approached the Shrewsbury Canal about a possible link between Norbury and Wappenshall. However, they experienced severe engineering difficulties in building their main line, and no further action was taken until 1831, when Henry Williams, who was superintendent and engineer for the Shrewsbury Canal and also worked for the Birmingham and Liverpool Junction company, costed a project to make the Shrewsbury Canal suitable for standard 7-foot (2.1 m) narrow boats. In the event, only the two locks to the west of Wappenshall were widened, and specially-built boats were used on the Trench branch, which could negotiate the narrower locks. The new canal to Wappenshall Junction opened in 1835.

The Birmingham and Liverpool Junction Canal became part of the Shropshire Union Canal in 1846, having amalgamated with the Ellesmere and Chester Canal the previous year. The Shropshire Union company bought up most of the East Shropshire network soon afterwards, and ran it profitably until the early twentieth century. However, decline set in after the First World War, and the Trench incline was closed in 1921, followed by Shrewsbury Basin in 1922. The canal, along with Wappenshall junction, was closed in 1944 under an Act of Parliament obtained by the London Midland and Scottish Railway, who owned it by then.

== Restoration ==
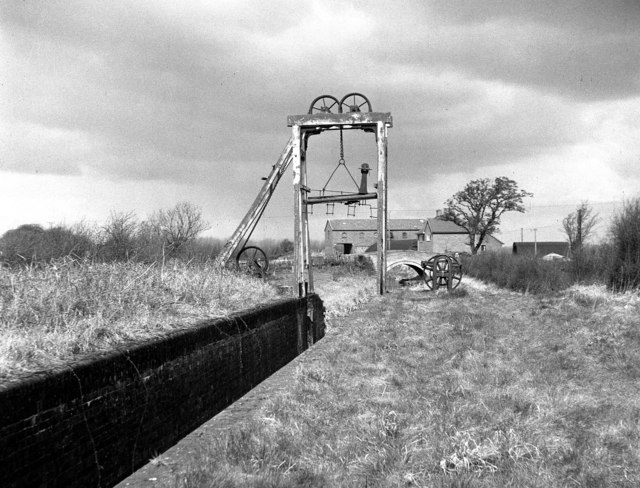
Remains of the guillotine gate at Wappenshall Lock in 1964. The bottom gates were of the guillotine type and the remains of one set of the gear for these gates can be seen.

Today the junction still has a warehouse over part of the canal, a roving bridge, and has been the subject of work by the Shrewsbury & Newport Canals Trust.

In 2007, the canalside buildings at Wappenshall, including a trans-shipment warehouse which has been little altered since it ceased to be used in the 1930s, and retains many original features, were put up for sale. They were eventually purchased, along with a length of the canal and the Wappenshall basin, by Telford and Wrekin Council, who are working with the Shrewsbury & Newport Canals Trust to allow repairs to the buildings to be undertaken, with the aim of providing a museum and heritage centre for the canal, a cafe, and offices for the Canals Trust.

The link from Newport to Wappenshalll was crossed by a towpath bridge immediately before the junction. This is still in situ, and is a grade II listed structure. Nearby is a three-storey dock warehouse, which straddles a section of the canal. The first floor includes trap doors, which allowed goods to be hoisted up from the canal boats into the warehouse. It is also listed, and was built by the 2nd Duke of Sutherland, rather than the canal company, as was the basin. The Sutherland Estate also built a fine office for the canal toll clerk. It is a two-storey building, constructed of red bricks, with a central half-octagonal bay containing three sets of windows. A small community developed around the junction, as several cottages and the Sutherland Arms public house were built close by. The building is now called Bridge House, and it was rented to John Tranier when it was first opened.

On the route to Shrewsbury, the canal was crossed by a lift bridge, to the west of the junction. The Trench Branch, which heads south-east, passes under a minor road at Wappenshall Bridge, and Wappenshall Lock, the first of the nine to Trench, was just after it. Although much of the basin has been filled in, there is still some water in the canal through the basin, as the Hurley Brook, which formerly ran to the south of the canal, has been diverted into it just below Britton Lock, the second on the Trench Branch, and leaves it again below Eyton Lock, the first on the route to Shrewsbury.

== See also ==
- Canals of the United Kingdom
- History of the British canal system

== Bibliography ==
- Hadfield, Charles (1985). The Canals of the West Midlands. David and Charles. ISBN 0-7153-8644-1.
- Nicholson (2006). Nicholson Waterways Guide (Vol 4): Four Counties and the Welsh Canals. Harper Collins. ISBN 0-00-721112-0.
- "Maps". Shrewsbury and Newport Canals Trust.
