= Tibberton, Shropshire =

Village in Shropshire, England

Coordinates: 52.779°N 2.474°W

Tibberton
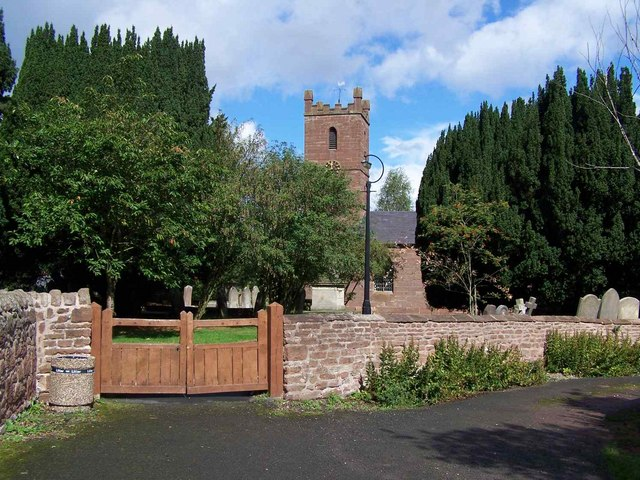
- Tibberton Church

- Location within Shropshire
- OS grid reference: SJ680202
- Civil parish: Tibberton and Cherrington
- Unitary authority: Telford and Wrekin
- Ceremonial county: Shropshire
- Region: West Midlands
- Country: England
- Sovereign state: United Kingdom
- Post town: NEWPORT
- Postcode district: TF10
- Dialling code: 01952
- Police: West Mercia
- Fire: Shropshire
- Ambulance: West Midlands
- UK Parliament: The Wrekin

Tibberton is a village and former civil parish, now in the parish of Tibberton and Cherrington, in the borough of Telford and Wrekin and ceremonial county of Shropshire, England. In 1961 the parish had a population of 319. On 1 April 1988 the parish was abolished to form "Tibberton & Cherrington".

It is a fairly small village with some new barn conversions contrasting with the older houses. Much new housing has been planned by the borough council for the village however. The River Meese flows just to the north of the village. The B5062 road runs less than a mile away, to the south.

In the way of amenities, Tibberton has a pub, The Sutherland Arms, and a small primary school. Following two years without a shop, a community shop opened in the village in December 2011. Newport, the nearest town, is only 4 miles (6.4 km) away, to the east.

There is a holy well within the parish of Tibberton, marked on the 1:50 000 map and signposted on the roads. The well has given its name to the district round about, but is not easy to locate on the ground. A gully takes one from the road, turns to a path, and the well is in a little wood. Water from the spring has carved out a little stream running down the short distance to the River Meese.

Nearby is the small village of Cherrington.

== See also ==
- Listed buildings in Child's Ercall
- Listed buildings in Tibberton and Cherrington
