= Waters Upton =

Village in Shropshire, England

Coordinates: 52.771°N 2.544°W

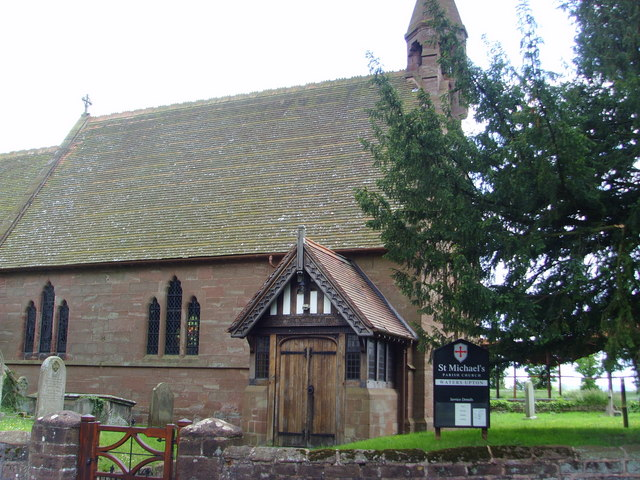
- St Michael's Church

- Location within Shropshire
- Population: 951 (2011)
- OS grid reference: SJ633194
- Civil parish: Waters Upton
- Unitary authority: Telford and Wrekin
- Ceremonial county: Shropshire
- Region: West Midlands
- Country: England
- Sovereign state: United Kingdom
- Post town: TELFORD
- Postcode district: TF6
- Dialling code: 01952
- Police: West Mercia
- Fire: Shropshire
- Ambulance: West Midlands
- UK Parliament: The Wrekin

Waters Upton is a small village and civil parish in the Telford and Wrekin district, in the county of Shropshire, England. The population of the civil parish at the 2011 Census was 951.

It was recorded in the Domesday Book as "Uptone", when it was stated to be tenanted by a "Seuuard", and to have been held by a man called "Gamel" before the Conquest. At the time of the survey it contained 3 ox-teams, 4 neat-herds, 4 villeins, 1 boor and 1 radman, and a mill of 12s. 1d. annual value. In a reversal of the usual order seen in the naming of places and landowning families, it became known as Waters Upton after an early landowner, Walter Fitzjohn.

The civil parish, which had a total population of 873 at the 2001 census, also includes the villages of Great Bolas and Crudgington.

The village is just off the A442 and has a church, one pub (the Lion) as well as a post office.

== See also ==
- Listed buildings in Waters Upton
