= Crudgington =

Village in Shropshire, England

Coordinates: 52°45′32″N 2°32′56″W

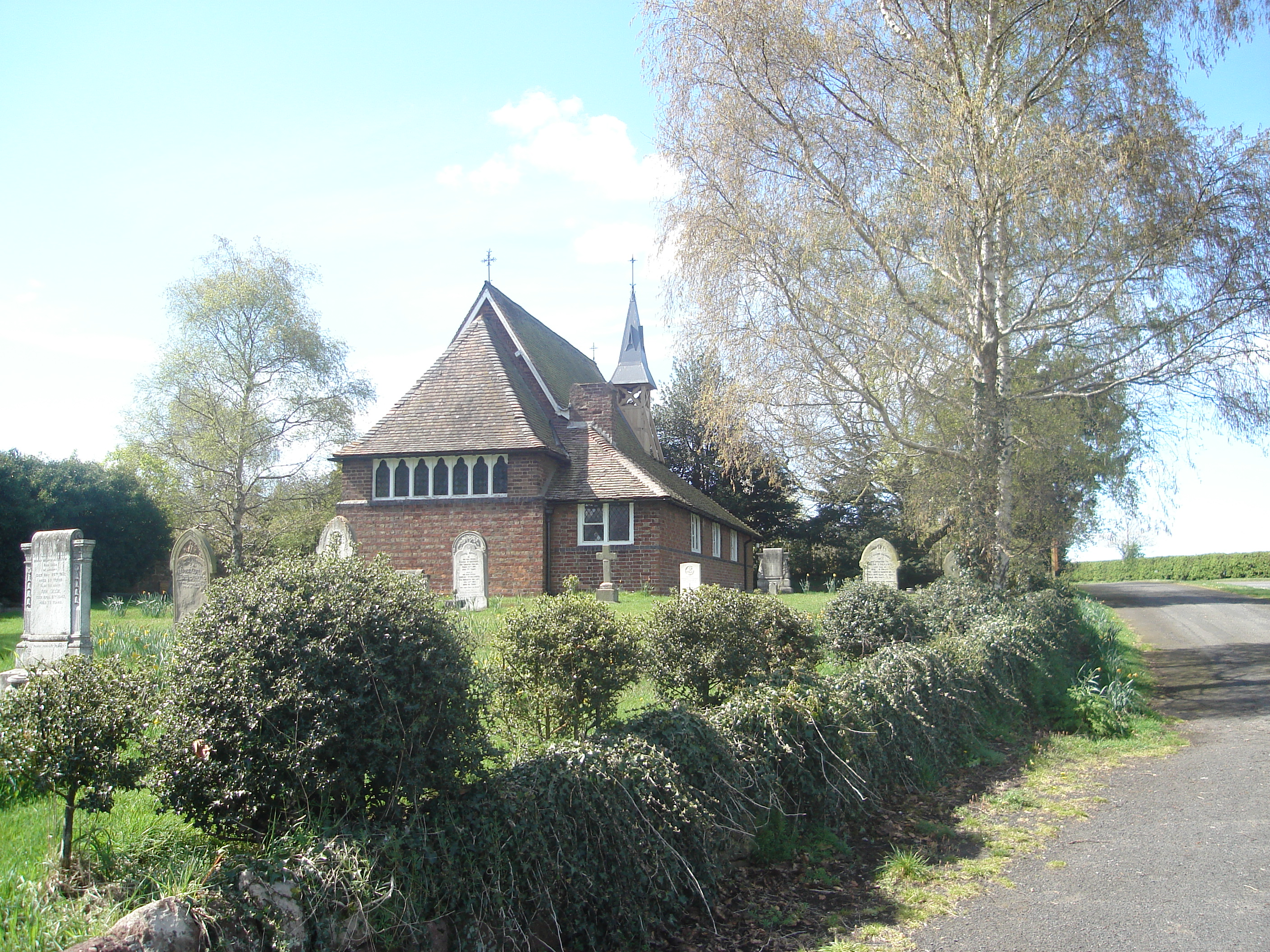
- Church of St. Mary, Crudgington

- Location within Shropshire
- OS grid reference: SJ629181
- Civil parish: Waters Upton
- Unitary authority: Telford and Wrekin
- Ceremonial county: Shropshire
- Region: West Midlands
- Country: England
- Sovereign state: United Kingdom
- Post town: Telford
- Postcode district: TF6
- Dialling code: 01952
- Police: West Mercia
- Fire: Shropshire
- Ambulance: West Midlands
- UK Parliament: The Wrekin

Crudgington is a village in the borough of Telford and Wrekin and ceremonial county of Shropshire, England. It is situated in the civil parish of Waters Upton, a village to the north, and is 7 miles north-west of Telford. Nearby is the confluence of the rivers Tern and Strine; the village lies at an elevation of 55 metres (180 ft).

== History ==
Crudgington is mentioned in the Domesday Book, where it is called Crugetone. Its lord was Robert Butler, under Earl Roger, who had 1½ hides of land under cultivation, one plough and three serfs. Also living there were nine villagers, two smallholders and a freeman with three ploughs. There were four fisheries here and it provided a payment of £4 and 1000 eels.

By 1269, the village had passed into the hands of Shrewsbury Abbey. In 1285, it is recorded as part of the manor of Slepe.

After the Dissolution of the Monasteries, the village became part of the Lilleshall estate and their landlords, who later became the Dukes of Sutherland were responsible for building several of the houses in the village, including Leasowes Farm (dated 1817) and Tern Farm.

== Transport ==
On 16 October 1867, the Wellington and Market Drayton Railway line from Wellington to Market Drayton was opened, which included a station at Crudgington. However, lack of use forced the line to close to passenger traffic on 9 September 1963, and to freight four years later.

The A442 road from Telford to Whitchurch and B5062 road from Newport to Shrewsbury cross at Crudgington. As well as private and commercial traffic, they are used by local bus services 341, 342, 519, 820, WR2 and WR3.

== Landmarks ==
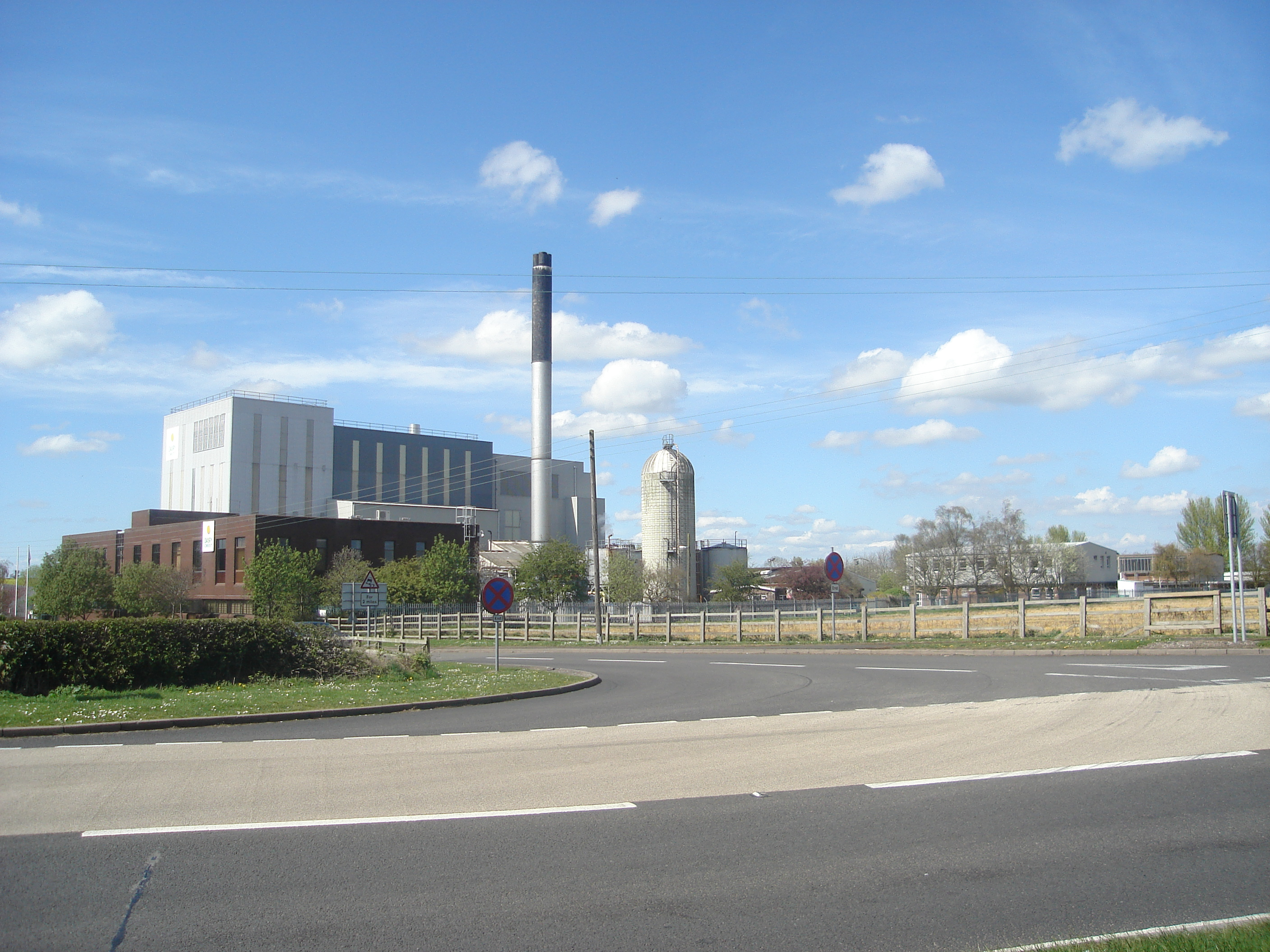
The Dairy Crest Creamery at Crudgington, closed 2014

There was a large dairy factory and creamery in Crudgington. It was originally formed as a co-operative in the 1920s, then taken over in 1935 by the Milk Marketing Board and eventually operated under the Dairy Crest name, producing butter and Clover, Argento and Willow spreads, as well as Country Life Butter. The factory employed about 300 people in 2005. The plant was closed late in 2014, when production of the spreads was concentrated in Kirkby near Liverpool. There was also a research and development department which following the closure was moved to a new innovation centre built by the company at Harper Adams University near Newport, transferring around 40 members of its staff there. The Crudgington premises were due for demolition in 2015.

Also notable is the small local church, built in 1863 by J. L. Randal and dedicated to St. Mary. It is a member of the Church of England and a daughter church of the parish of High Ercall, usually holding services twice per month. It has a wooden bell chamber and spirelet.

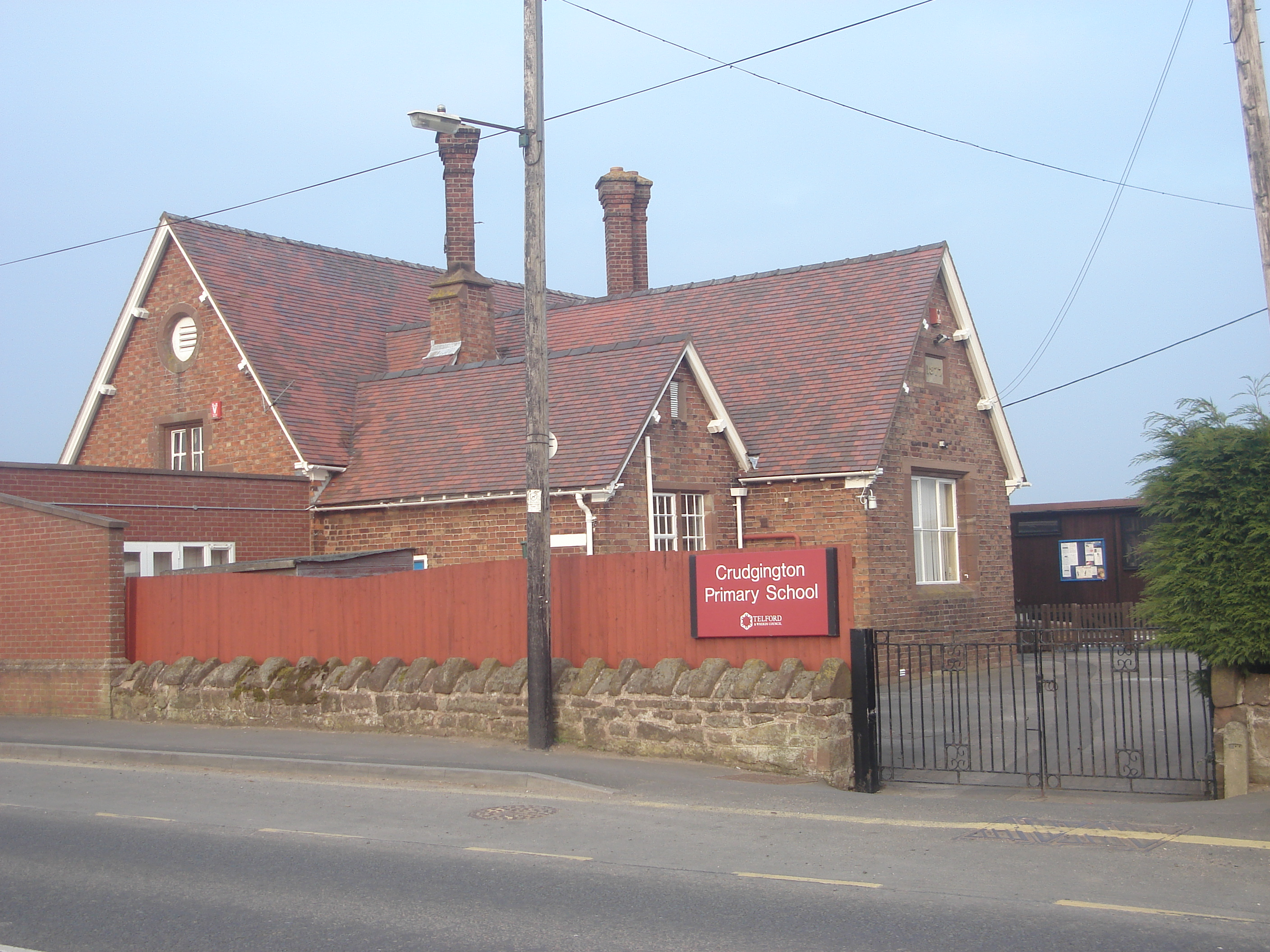
Crudgington Primary School

There is a primary school, with 116 students (2008 figure) ranging in age from 3 to 11. It is a non-denominational, mixed-sex school.

2009 SATs Results for Key Stage 2.
Number of 11-year-olds	21
Percentage getting level 4 in English	82
Percentage getting level 4 in Maths	73
Percentage getting level 4 in Combined English and Maths	73
Percentage getting level 4 in Science	95
Average Point Score	27.6

== In popular culture ==
In Bill Tidy's long-running cartoon published in the monthly Campaign for Real Ale newsletter, a fictional Crudgington Brewery is a regular feature, as the beer of choice ("Crudgington's") of the strip's main character. It is a regional family brewery, with a similar presentation as the non-fictional Boddington's brand.

== Notes ==
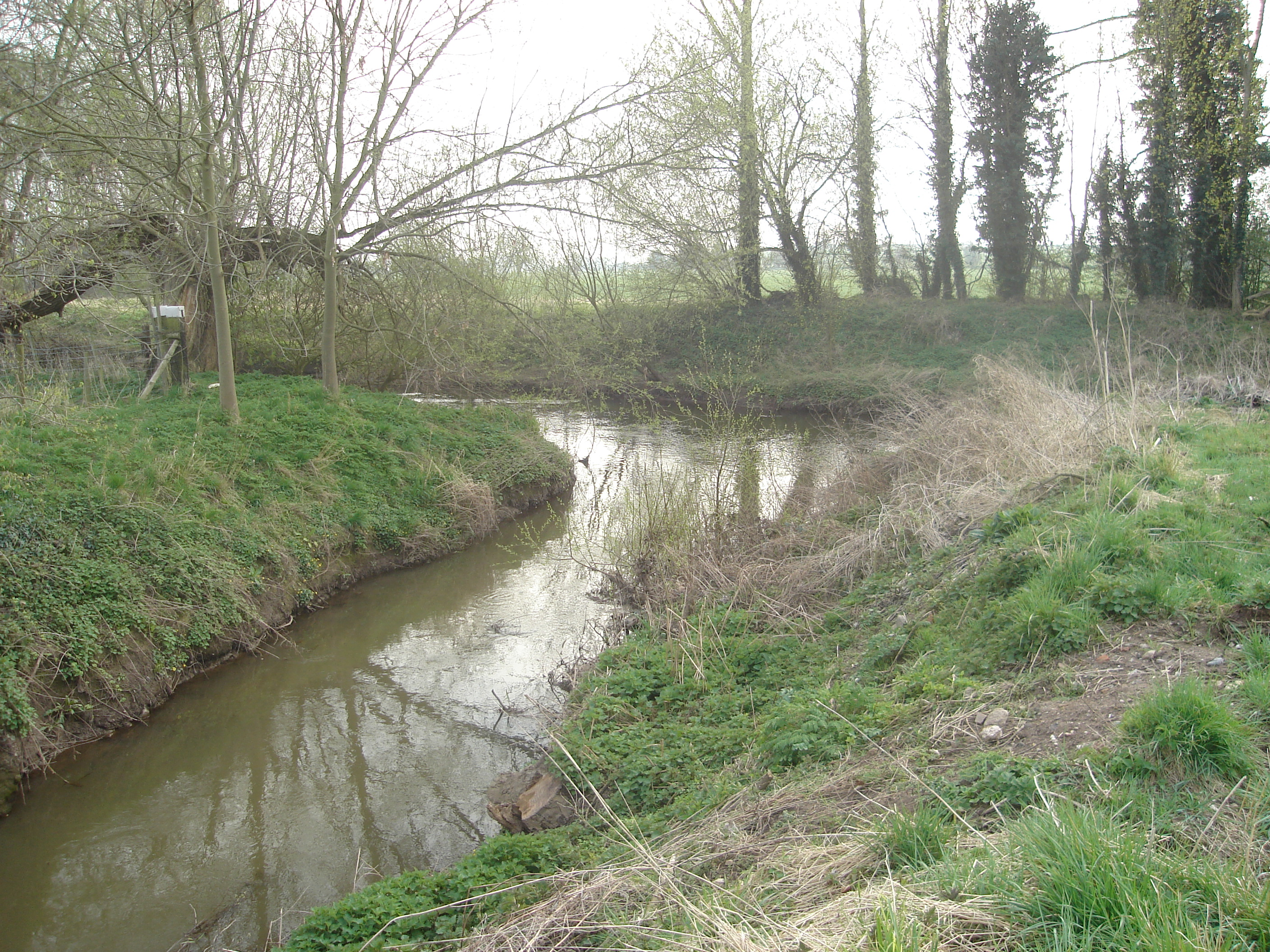
Confluence of the rivers Strine (foreground) and Tern near Crudgington
