= Adeney =

Hamlet in Shropshire, England

Coordinates: 52.761°N 2.443°W

- Hamlet
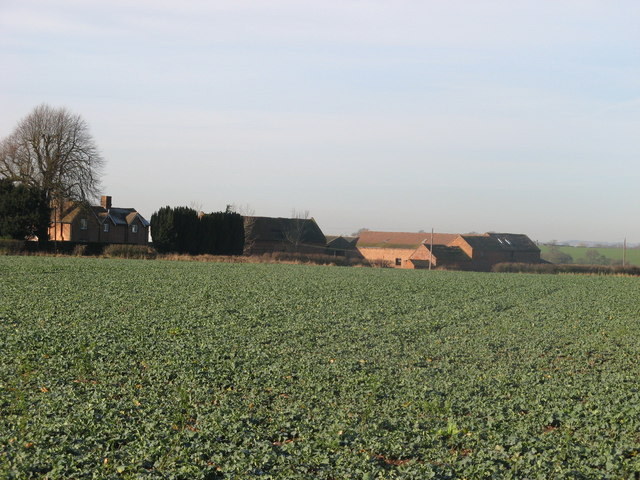
- Farm buildings in the hamlet of Adeney, Shropshire.

- Location within Shropshire
- OS grid reference: SJ701182
- Civil parish: Edgmond
- Unitary authority: Telford and Wrekin
- Ceremonial county: Shropshire
- Region: West Midlands
- Country: England
- Sovereign state: United Kingdom
- Post town: NEWPORT
- Postcode district: TF10
- Dialling code: 01952
- Police: West Mercia
- Fire: Shropshire
- Ambulance: West Midlands
- UK Parliament: The Wrekin

Adeney is a hamlet in the Telford and Wrekin borough of Shropshire, England. It is located in the civil parish of Edgmond. Its name was formerly also spelt Adney, and derives from an Old English name meaning "Eadwynne's island". It lies in an area of the Weald Moors known as the "Birch Moors"; the closest villages are Edgmond, to the east, and Tibberton, to the north-west.
