= Patton, Shropshire =

Coordinates: 52.550°N 2.614°W

Patton
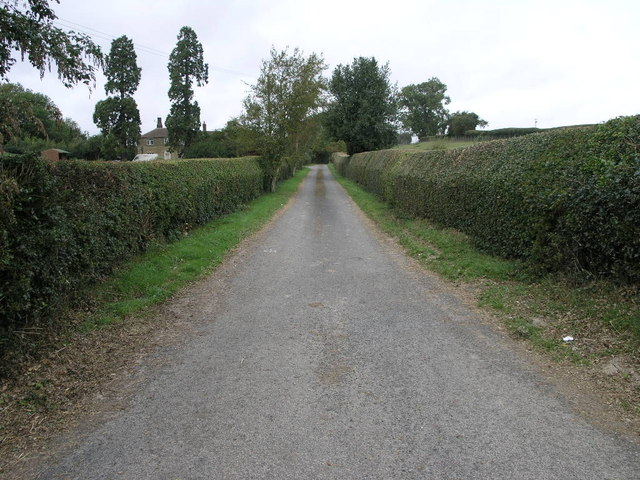
- The lane leading to Patton Grange Farm

- Location within Shropshire
- OS grid reference: SO583949
- Civil parish: Stanton Long
- Unitary authority: Shropshire
- Ceremonial county: Shropshire
- Region: West Midlands
- Country: England
- Sovereign state: United Kingdom
- Post town: MUCH WENLOCK
- Postcode district: TF13
- Dialling code: 01746
- Police: West Mercia
- Fire: Shropshire
- Ambulance: West Midlands
- UK Parliament: Ludlow

Patton is a hamlet in Shropshire, England.

It is located in the civil parish of Stanton Long on the B4378 road between Bourton and Brockton. It lies on the eastern hillside of the upper Corve valley at an elevation of around 205 metres (673 ft) above sea level. The market town of Much Wenlock is 3.5 miles (5.6 km) distant.

== History ==
The name was first recorded in 901 as Peatingtune; it is Old English and means from "the farmstead of Peat(t)a" or "the farmstead of the sons or people of Peat(t)a".

The manor of Patton was recorded in the Domesday Book as Patintone and belonging to the hundred of Patton. The Book recorded in Patton only 6 households, which represented a quite small settlement. The caput of Patton hundred no longer was in Patton itself by 1066, but at Corfham which was a manor held by the king.

=== Hundred ===
It formed part of and gave its name to the Saxon hundred of Patton, which existed until the early 12th century.

Patton hundred was then amalgamated with Culvestan into the new Munslow hundred. However circa 1200 a part of the Patton township was ceded to the franchise of Wenlock.
