= Ludford, Shropshire =

Village in Shropshire, England

Coordinates: 52.361°N 2.718°W

Ludford
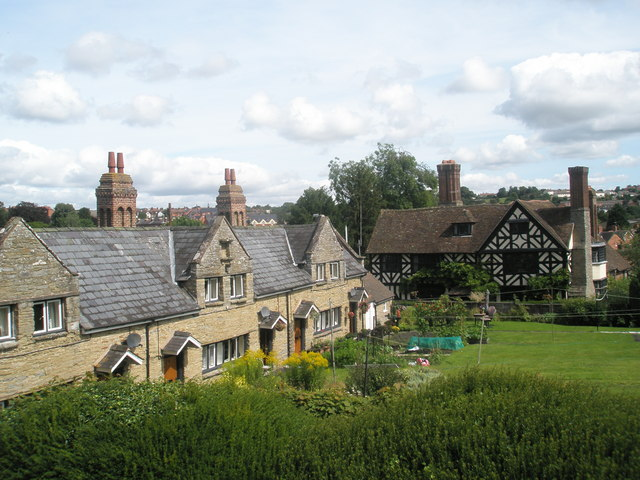
- The view from St Giles churchyard, showing St Giles Hospital and The Old Bell

- Location within Shropshire
- Population: 673 (civil parish, 2011)
- OS grid reference: SO511739
  - London: 154 miles (248 km)
- Civil parish: Ludford
- Unitary authority: Shropshire
- Ceremonial county: Shropshire
- Region: West Midlands
- Country: England
- Sovereign state: United Kingdom
- Post town: LUDLOW
- Postcode district: SY8
- Dialling code: 01584
- Police: West Mercia
- Fire: Shropshire
- Ambulance: West Midlands
- UK Parliament: Ludlow

Ludford is a small village and civil parish in south Shropshire, England. The parish is situated adjacent to the market town of Ludlow and was, until 1895, partly in Herefordshire.

The village is on the south bank of the River Teme, with Ludlow on the north bank, and is connected to the town by the grade I listed Ludford Bridge. The village is geologically notable with its Ludford Corner.

== History and geography ==
=== Etymology ===
The place name means the ford at the loud waters ("lud"); Ludlow's name means the hill ("low") by the loud waters. The loud waters are those of the River Teme, which flow rapidly through the area (now largely tamed by weirs).

=== Domesday Book ===
Ludford, Steventon, and the Sheet are all mentioned in the Domesday Book of 1086 as manors. They existed prior to the town of Ludlow, which grew up during or after the construction of the Norman castle there.

=== Shropshire and Herefordshire ===
Historically the parish was divided between Shropshire and Herefordshire and the village itself, despite its proximity to the Salopian town of Ludlow, fell within Herefordshire (the county boundary at this point being the River Teme). Steventon and the Sheet on the other hand were in Shropshire. In 1895, as a result of the Local Government Act 1894, the Herefordshire element of the parish of Ludford joined Shropshire, which also meant a transfer from Herefordshire's Wolphy hundred to that of Munslow. Also as a result of the same 1894 Act of Parliament, which reformed civil parishes into the present-day form (with elected parish councils) the combined area became the civil parish of Ludford.

=== Hundreds ===
At the time of the Domesday Book, Ludford came within the Herefordshire hundred of Wolphy, whilst Steventon and the Sheet (as well as Ludlow, by way of it being part of Stanton Lacy at the time) came within Culvestan, a Shropshire hundred originating in Anglo-Saxon times but which ended in the reign of Henry I. Steventon, the Sheet and Holdgate Fee (see section below) became part of Munslow hundred after Culvestan's dissolution, as did Ludlow. The Herefordshire element of the parish remained as part of Wolphy hundred throughout until its transfer to Shropshire in 1895, by which time the hundreds of England had become defunct.

=== Rout of Ludford Bridge ===
During the Wars of the Roses, a minor battle was fought at Ludford in 1459, which became known as the Rout of Ludford Bridge.

=== Ludford House ===
The village contains a former country house – Ludford House – and the remains of its parkland. It originated as the area's manor house and was acquired in 1607 by the Charlton family. Sir Job Charlton, speaker of the House of Commons, was created a baronet in 1686. The Charlton baronetcy however has since become extinct. By the 1840s, the parkland (Ludford Park) had become enclosed and used as farmland. Ludford House is no longer one residence and has been divided into separate dwellings.

=== Roads ===
The turnpike road to Hereford, now the B4361 (named Overton Road in Ludford), was built through the parkland of Ludford House in the 1820s and passes right by the back of the House. Park Road, no longer a through-road, was once the main thoroughfare leading southwards from the ford, and later the bridge, and was until 1836 the main route to Worcester, running via Steventon. Whitcliffe Road begins at the B4361 in the centre of Ludford, heads across Whitcliffe Common towards Mortimer Forest, and runs eventually to Wigmore.

National Cycle Route 44 runs through the area, avoiding the main roads.

=== Civil parish ===
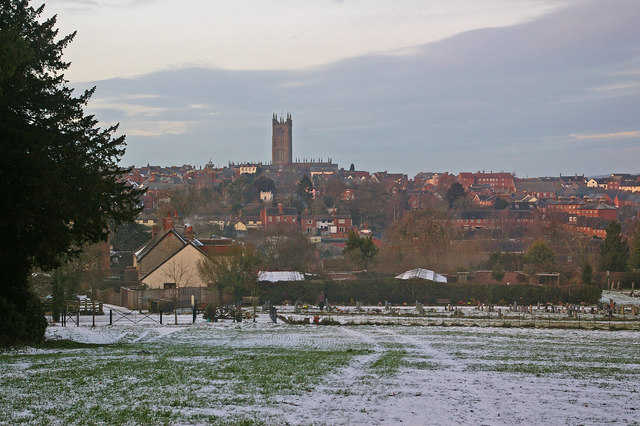
The view north across the Teme from the eastern part of Ludford village, with the skyline of Ludlow dominated by St Laurence's Church.

The civil parish of Ludford (which now covers a slightly different area than the ecclesiastical parish) runs along the south and east boundaries of Ludlow and includes the settlements of Ludford, the Sheet, Foldgate, Rocks Green, and Steventon. It is effectively divided by the River Teme into two halves (with no way to cross the river within the parish boundaries, since the 19th-century closure of the ancient road and ford to Steventon). The parish council meets outside the parish in Ludlow.

==== Population ====
In 2011, the population of the parish was counted at 673. The parish's population count increasingly derives from the housing being constructed on the eastern fringe of Ludlow, which largely accounted for the considerable increase in the parish's population from 395 recorded in 2001; the population of the village of Ludford itself is stable and is less than 150.

==== Boundaries ====
In 1884 the part of the parish to the east of Ledwyche Brook was transferred to Bitterley; in the same year, the civil parish of East Hamlet was formed out of Stanton Lacy, resulting in Ludford and Stanton Lacy no longer bordering one another. The border between the parishes of Ludlow and Ludford had remained unchanged since medieval times, with Weeping Cross Lane and Rock Lane as the limit of Ludlow to the north of the Teme. In 1901 the area of land, which was becoming suburban, between the railway line and the River Teme (up to Mary's Meadow) was included into Ludlow from Ludford, including the Holdgate Fee (see section below). In 1934 the Whitcliffe (which had been acquired by the burgesses of Ludlow already in the 13th century) and the area north of the railway line, in the vicinity of Gallows Bank were transferred from Ludford to Ludlow. Circa 1967 the borders of Ludlow, Bromfield and Ludlow were re-aligned in the Whitcliffe area, with the Ludford-Ludlow/Bromfield border routed along the Wigmore road, and with an overall transfer of land to Ludford.

In 1987 the civil parish of East Hamlet was abolished and largely absorbed by Ludford, the populous part of this parish having previously been absorbed by the town and civil parish of Ludlow. At the same time, the boundary with Ludlow in this eastern area was re-aligned along the A49 by-pass (though Foldgate remains within Ludford). This involved small transfers between Ludlow and Ludford; the 1987 transfers brought all of Rocks Green into Ludford parish (it was previously on the border of East Hamlet and Ludlow) and created a second boundary with Bromfield, with Ludlow now encircled by the two parishes of Ludford and Bromfield.

The total area of the parish (post-1987) is 875 hectares (2,160 acres).

==== Holdgate Fee ====
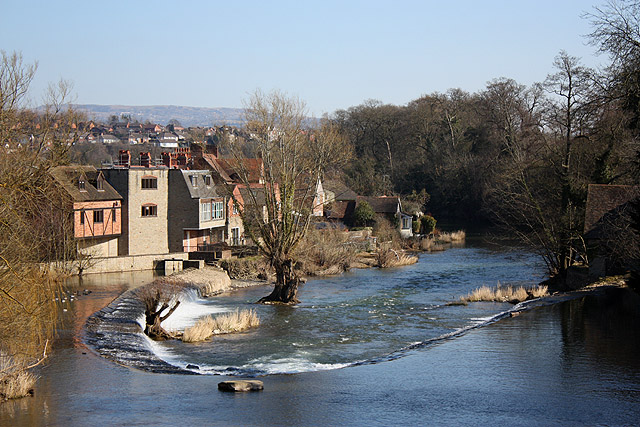
Looking downstream from Ludford Bridge at the Horseshoe Weir. The former ford was just below where the weir now is, roughly where the river turns slightly to the left. The part of Ludlow on the north bank just beyond the ford remained part of the parish of Ludford until 1901.

Holdgate Fee (or Holdgate's Fee) was a small part of the parish on the north side of the Teme which remained as a practical enclave (it continued the parish north across the river, but with no regular means of access without passing through Ludlow) within Ludlow's parish from c. 1200 (when Ludlow parish was formed) to 1901. Ludlow's parish was established upon land mostly from Stanton Lacy, but also with some from Ludford (which had extended in a northeast direction from the village, crossing the ford). Holdgate Fee was a rectangular plot of land located at the foot of Old Street, on the east side of the street, near the site of the former ford. The name came about as for a long period it was an estate in land (a fee) belonging to the manor of Steventon, which in turn was owned by the lordship of Castle Holdgate. Common with the other parts of Ludford's parish that lay north of the Teme, it belonged to Shropshire and the hundred of Culvestan, later Munslow.

The lower stretch of Old Street (below Old Gate) became known as Holdgate Fee, as the fee (the estate owned by Holdgate) encompasses other land in the area, not just the Ludford enclave. Today the street is Old Street for its entire length, the former fee commemorated on the west side of the street by blocks of housing named Upper Fee and Lower Fee. The Ludford Parish Rooms were located at Holdgate Fee.

==== Sheet, Foldgate and Rocks Green ====
The Sheet and neighbouring Foldgate are the locations of major new developments on the edge of Ludlow with a retail and business park to provide new jobs and amenities.

Rocks Green has recently had a new housing estate built (at the Dun Cow farm) and is a location for further urban expansion of Ludlow. There is a long-established pub here – the Nelson Inn. The A4117 road runs through Rocks Green and the roundabout where it joins the A49 is named the Rocks Green roundabout. As of 2021, a Sainsbury's supermarket is being constructed by the Rocks Green roundabout.

==== Elan aqueduct ====
The Elan aqueduct passes through the parish, largely in tunnel, and crosses the Teme by way of a bridge near Steventon.

== Bridge ==
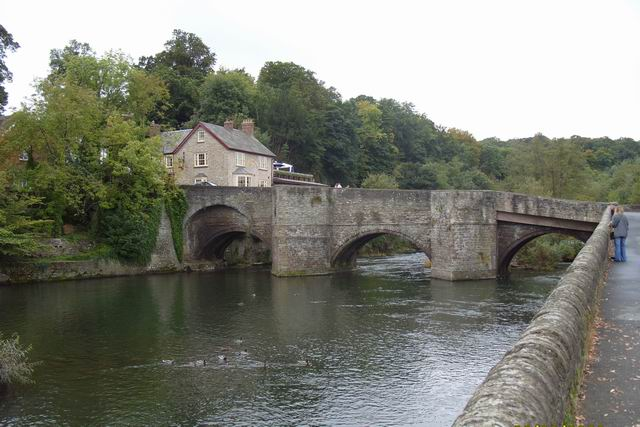
Ludford Bridge, which now takes the B4361 road across the River Teme, from downstream on the Ludlow side. The Charlton Arms, a large public house, is just behind.

Ludford Bridge is a 3-arch grade I listed masonry bridge crossing the Teme immediately north of the village of Ludford. It is also a scheduled ancient monument. Built in the 15th century, replacing an earlier bridge possibly built by Josce de Dinan, it was restored in 1886 (following a serious flood) and has 20th-century modifications on the north (Ludlow) end. The bridge gives its name to the 1459 Rout of Ludford Bridge, which took place to its south in Ludford.

The bridge is upstream of the original ford that gave Ludford its name, which was at the bottom of Ludlow's Old Street, continuing that ancient road across the river into Ludford (at what became Ludford Mill) joining Park Lane. This ancient route then carried on in a southeasterly direction towards Tenbury and Worcester via another fording of the Teme at Steventon. The part of the route from Park Lane to Steventon is no longer in existence.

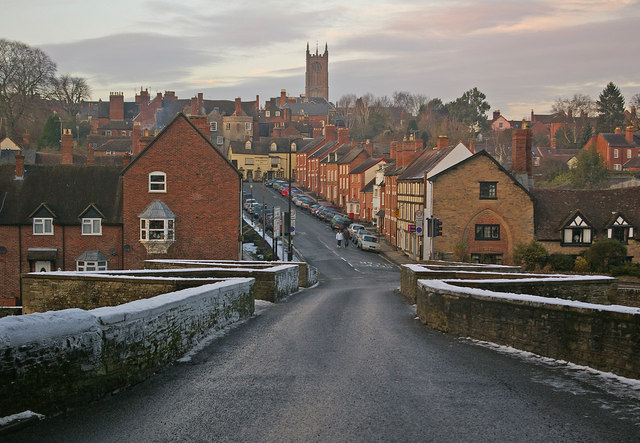
Looking over the bridge towards Ludlow's Lower Broad Street and St Laurence's church; the B4361 heads right after the bridge.

On the Ludlow side, the bridge is located at the foot of Lower Broad Street, though the B4361 route runs instead along Temeside and then Old Street.

Several weirs have been built on the Teme around Ludlow, including the Horseshoe Weir immediately downstream (east) of Ludford Bridge. The disused Ludford Mill (for milling corn) used the water gradient of this weir.

St Catherine's Chapel existed in the medieval era on the Ludford end of the bridge, on the west side.

In January 2011 part of the masonry on one side of the central arch collapsed into the river below, temporarily closing off the bridge to traffic. The bridge was repaired, but in February 2016 a vehicle caused further significant damage, resulting again in a prolonged closure whilst repair works were undertaken; it reopened in May 2016.

The bridge continues to be an important crossing point over the river, linking the centre of Ludlow with Ludford and places to the south and southwest of the town, including the town's livestock market. Until the opening of the Ludlow by-pass in 1979, the A49 road used the bridge (the B4361 through Ludlow and Ludford was then the A49). Vehicular traffic over the bridge is restricted to one direction at a time, and the two-way traffic on the road is controlled by traffic lights on both sides. Pedestrian refuges exist above the cutwaters between the arches.

== Geology ==
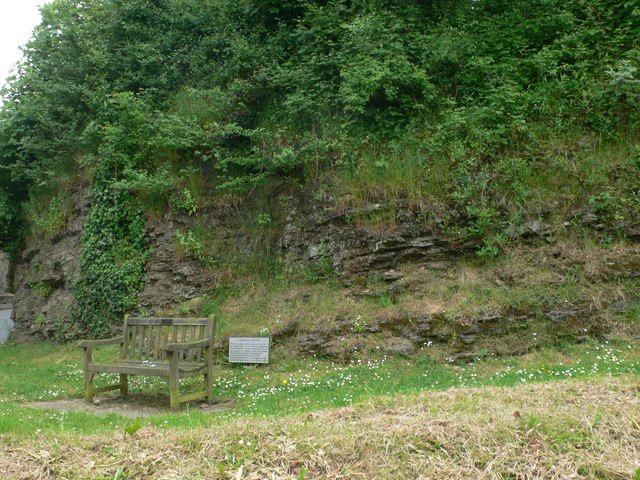
Ludford Corner

Ludford contains the world-renowned fossil site known as Ludford Corner, where the Ludlow bone beds can be viewed. It is situated in the centre of the village, at the junction of the B4361 ('Overton Road') and the road to Wigmore ('Ludford Lane' or 'Whitcliffe Road'). Being adjacent to the highway, it can be readily viewed by the public.

In 1832, Dr Thomas Lloyd, a Ludlow doctor and amateur geologist, met Roderick Murchison at Ludford Corner to study the rocks exposed along the River Teme and on Whitcliffe, advancing Murchison's theory for a Silurian System that he was to publish in 1839. Immediately above the topmost layer of the marine rock sequence forming Murchison's Silurian period was a thin layer of dark sand containing numerous remains of early fish, especially their scales, along with plant debris, spores and microscopic mites. In contrast to the underlying sediments of the Ludlow Series which were deposited in a shallow warm sea some 400 million years ago, the Ludlow Bone Bed represents terrestrial (land) conditions and thus a fundamental change in the landscape. At the time, this was believed to be the earliest occurrence of life on land. Murchison thus took the Ludlow Bone Bed as the base of his Devonian Period, although over a century later this boundary was to be moved a little higher, the overlying rocks being ascribed to the Pridoli. The science of geology has taken a number of local names from these studies and now applies them worldwide, in recognition of the importance of this area to scientific understanding, for example Ludlow Series and Whitcliffe Formation. The site is now an SSSI (Site of Special Scientific Interest) and still attracts international studies.

The geological period of the Ludfordian stage (part of the Ludlow epoch) is named after the village.

== St Giles church ==
There is an Anglican parish church, dedicated to Saint Giles, with its own small churchyard, which is situated at the centre of the village. It is a grade II* ("two star") listed building with origins in the 11th century, when it was a chapel of Bromfield Priory.

== Public houses ==
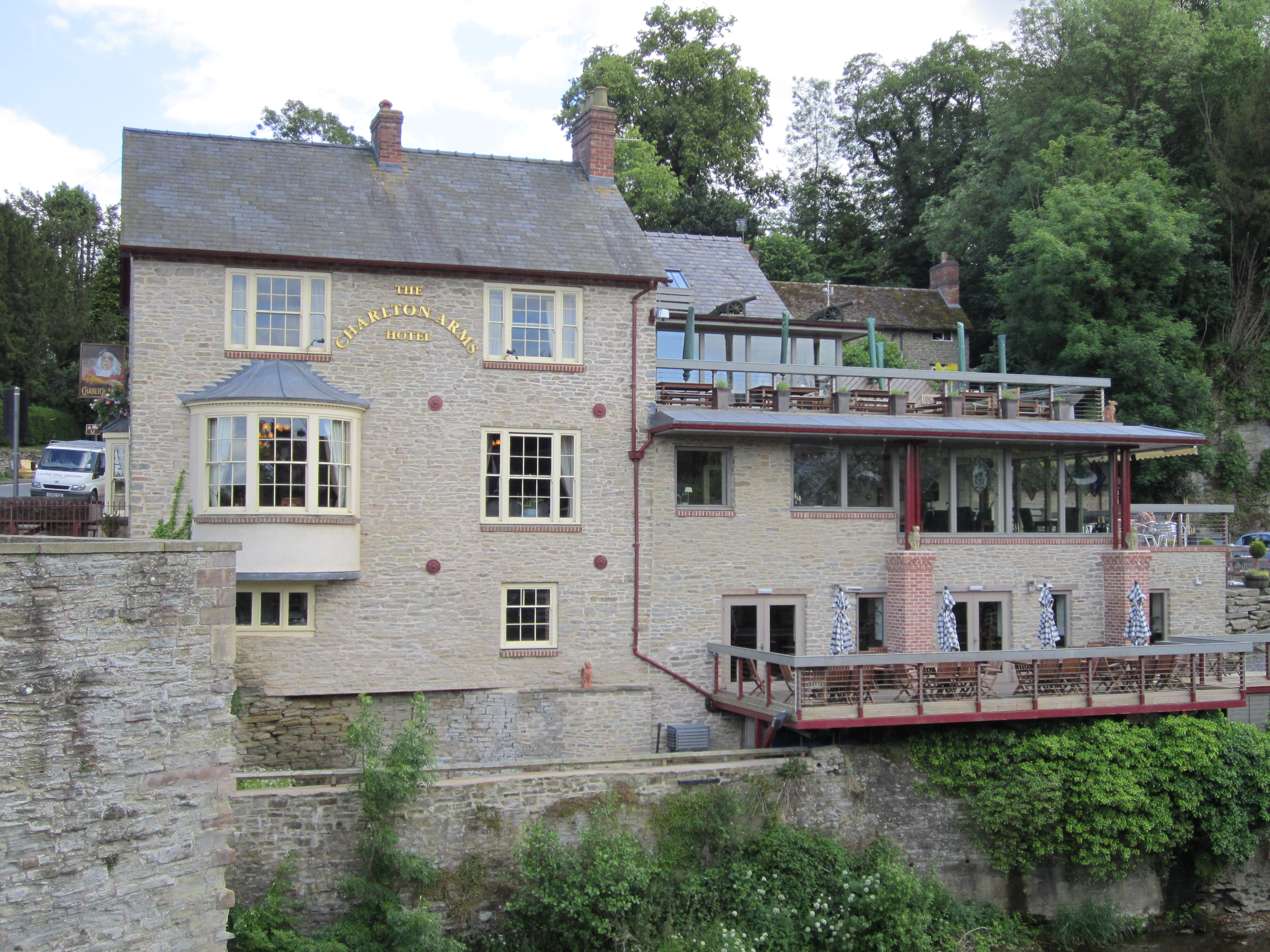
The Charlton Arms

The Charlton Arms is a historic public house by Ludford Bridge, now also a restaurant and hotel. It was formerly called the Red Lion but is now named for the Charlton baronets, whose seat was Ludford House, of which the first baronet was speaker of the House of Commons. The building was significantly extended in the late 2000s.

There was a coaching inn located on Park Road (until the early 19th century an important coaching thoroughfare on the road to Worcester) called the Bell Inn, now a private house. The name (and the huge bell used as a pub sign) was transferred to a pub on Lower Broad Street just on the other side of the river.

== Geographic information ==
The centre of the village lies at an elevation of 85.6 metres (281 ft) above sea level.

== See also ==
- Listed buildings in Ludford, Shropshire
