= Bourton, Shropshire =

Village in Shropshire, England

Coordinates: 52.563°N 2.599°W

Bourton
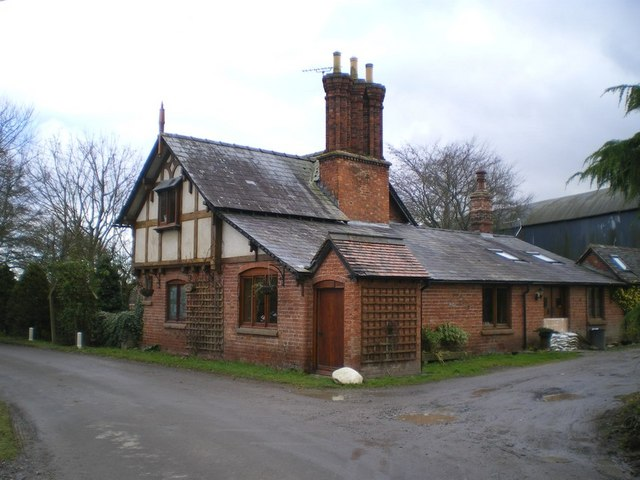

- Location within Shropshire
- OS grid reference: SO595963
- Civil parish: Much Wenlock
- Unitary authority: Shropshire
- Ceremonial county: Shropshire
- Region: West Midlands
- Country: England
- Sovereign state: United Kingdom
- Post town: MUCH WENLOCK
- Postcode district: TF13
- Dialling code: 01952
- Police: West Mercia
- Fire: Shropshire
- Ambulance: West Midlands
- UK Parliament: Ludlow

Bourton is a small village in Shropshire, England, 3 miles (5 km) southwest of Much Wenlock. It is part of the civil parish of Much Wenlock.

Holy Trinity Church, the parish church, is of 12th century origin, but was extended in 1844. It is a Grade II* listed building.

== History ==
Bourton was recorded in the Domesday Book as Burtune. At the time of the Domesday Book in 1086 the manor of Bourton was held by Wenlock Priory within the hundred of Patton. Early in the 12th century the hundred was merged with Culvestan to form the hundred of Munslow, but in 1198 Bourton was transferred with other manors held by the priory to the hundredal jurisdiction of the Liberty of Wenlock (also known as Wenlock Franchise). The principal court of the liberty met at Bourton, and the liberty outside the township of Much Wenlock was known as Bourton hundred by the 1220s.

In 1468 Edward IV granted the men of Much Wenlock a charter forming the Borough of Wenlock. Over the years the borough asserted jurisdiction over the liberty of Wenlock, including the hundred of Bourton. From the early 18th century the hundred ceased to meet at Bourton. Bourton was confirmed as part of the borough in 1836, when the borough was reformed as a municipal borough under the Municipal Corporations Act 1835. The borough was reduced in size in 1889, but continued to include Bourton until it was abolished in 1966. Bourton then became part of Bridgnorth Rural District until 1974, then Bridgnorth District until it was abolished in 2009 and superseded by the unitary Shropshire Council.

== See also ==
- Listed buildings in Much Wenlock
