= Munslow =

Village in Shropshire, England

Coordinates: 52.484°N 2.705°W

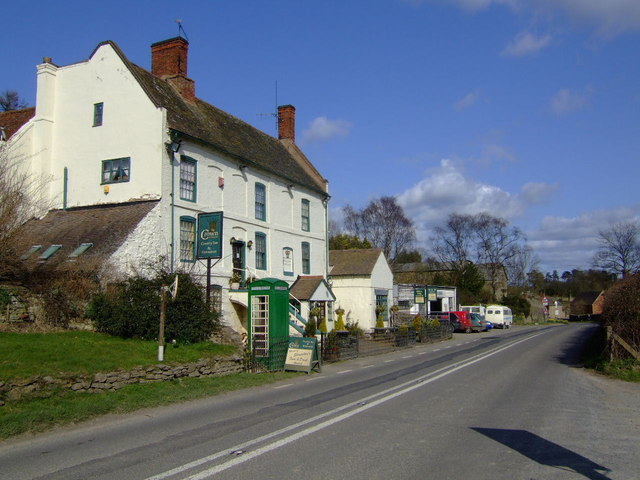
- The Crown Country Inn on the main road through the village

- Location within Shropshire
- Population: 386 (2011)
- OS grid reference: SO521876
- Civil parish: Munslow
- Unitary authority: Shropshire
- Ceremonial county: Shropshire
- Region: West Midlands
- Country: England
- Sovereign state: United Kingdom
- Post town: Craven Arms
- Postcode district: SY7
- Dialling code: 01584
- Police: West Mercia
- Fire: Shropshire
- Ambulance: West Midlands
- UK Parliament: Ludlow

Munslow is a small village and civil parish in Shropshire, England. It is situated on the B4368, 7 miles (11 km) northeast of the town of Craven Arms, in the Corvedale, at around 140 metres (460 ft) above sea level.

The village formed part of and gave its name to the hundred of Munslow which had various local administrative and legal functions for centuries, until the Local Government Act 1894.

== Location ==
Munslow is located in the mid-southern region of Shropshire. It borders the Shropshire Hills Area of Outstanding Natural Beauty. Less than a mile to the southwest, also on the B4368, is the village of Aston Munslow, which also has its own pub, The Swan. Also within the wide, rural parish are the hamlets of Broadstone, Little London and Upper Millichope. Running through the village is the small stream called 'Corve Brook'; this flows into the larger River Corve to the south of the village.

The Corvedale Three Castles Walk starts in Aston Munlow and goes through Munslow.

== History ==
Munslow as a settlement has a history dating back at least 1,000 years, with Munslow a part of the manor of Aston, which featured in the Domesday Book. The name Munslow derives from a place at a mound or tumulus ("-low") but the meaning of the first element ("Muns") is unclear. Aston Munslow was originally simply Aston, but its proximity to Munslow (which was chosen as the name for the hundred) meant it became known as Aston Munslow and in some old maps Munslow's Aston.

Munslow is a historic village with over 29 houses being listed grade II or above, although it has never had any major historical significance, the 'hundred house' of Munslow hundred acted as the centre for local administration and judicial functions for many centuries.

The grade I listed church 12th-century parish church, is dedicated to Saint Michael. and contains volumes of parish records and registers dating back to the 16th century.

== The village ==
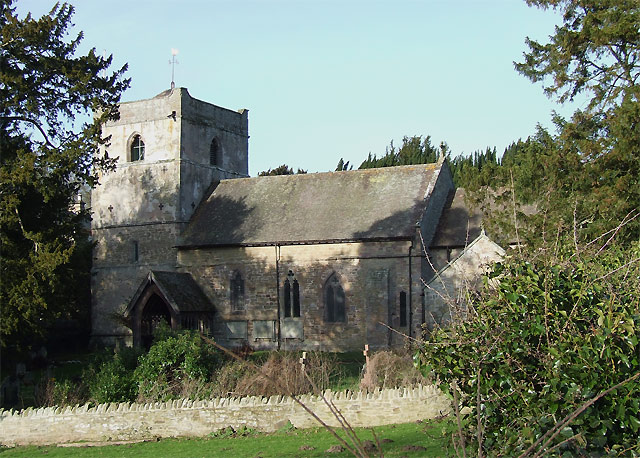
The historic parish church of St Michael

The 'hundred house' for Munslow hundred was originally located in Aston Munslow, but has stood in Munslow since the Tudor times and is now a local restaurant and pub known as 'The Crown Country Inn'.

Today, Munslow is a sparsely spread village with no community recreation area. At the centre of the village, however, there is a large World Wars war memorial in form of a cross, a village notice board, an antiquated water trough and a post box.

== White House ==
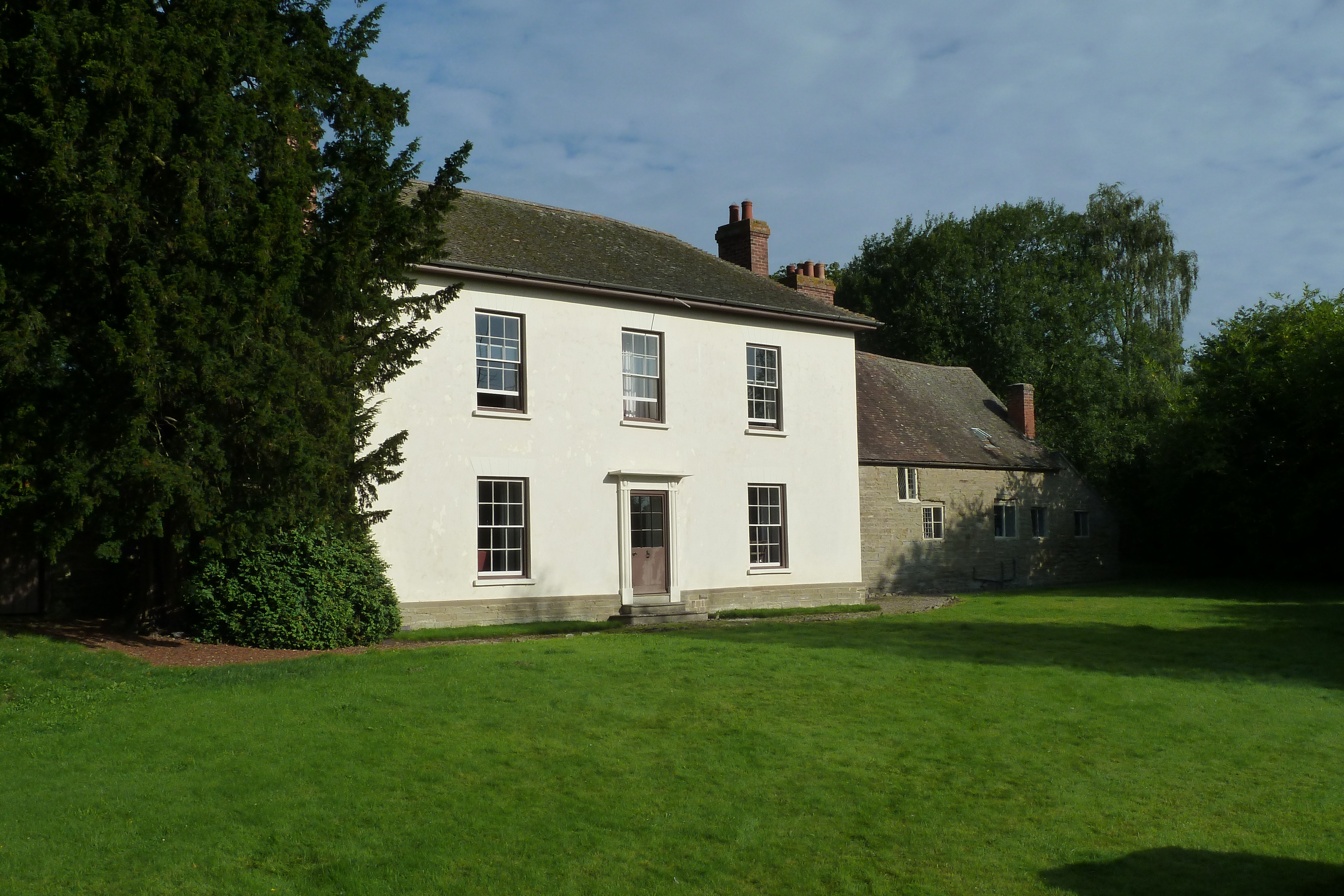
The White House

The White House in Aston Munslow is a medieval hall house that has undergone considerable alteration over the centuries. It is a grade II* listed building.

== Millichope Park ==
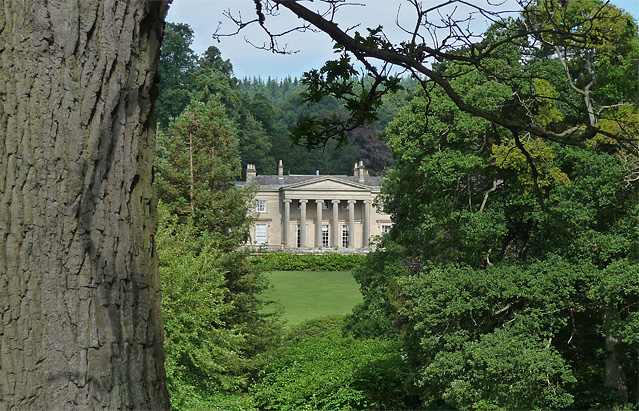
Millichope Park House

Millichope Park is a Greek Revival country house which stands in 220 acres (90 Hectares) of ornamental parkland. It also is a Grade II* listed building.

== Hundred ==
During the reign of Henry I the hundred of Munslow was formed; previously the manor of Aston (which Munslow belonged to) formed part of the Saxon hundred of Culvestan. Munslow hundred was formed from the majority of manors in the hundreds of Culvestan and Patton, along with some from Leintwardine which was being dissolved. The hundred of Munslow was divided into "upper" and "lower" divisions. Although never formally abolished, the hundreds of England have become obsolete.

== Education ==
Munslow was home to a school until 1982. It was located in the centre of the village where 'The Old School House' stands today. The name is not known, but at the height of its catchment in 1902, at least 98 pupils were believed to have regularly attended class.

Schools in Munslow history:

- 1573 to Unknown – Local rector gave basic education.
- 18th century – Dame schools
- Unknown to c.1842 – Munslow old farm house.
- c.1849 to 1982 – Munslow old farm house re-opened as a 'National School'.
- 1943 to 1945 – Roman Catholic school evacuated from Kent during World War II.
- 1948 to 1962 (moved) – Boys' secondary boarding school at Millichope Park.

== Local business ==
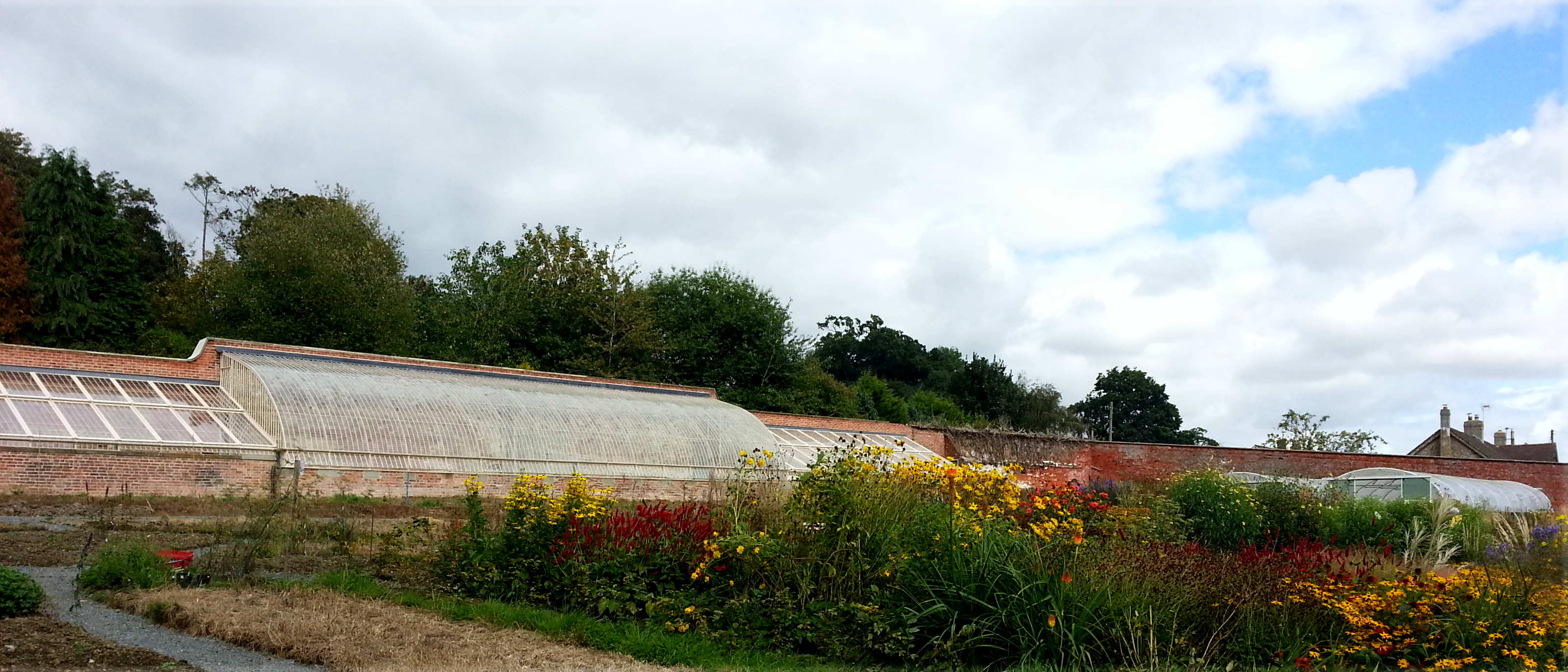
The Wild Goose nursery in the Walled garden, Millichope Park.

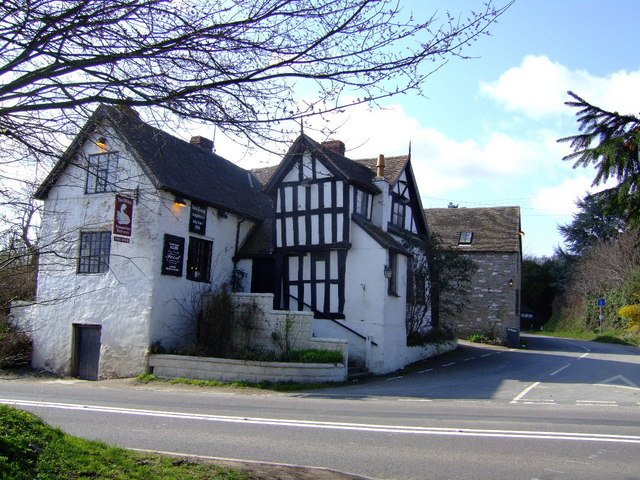
The Swan, Aston Munslow

Munslow has a number of businesses: the Crown Country Inn, Coseley House Bed & Breakfast and the Crown Garage (currently closed). The Crown Country Inn is situated at the south end of the village and was formally the area's 'hundred house'. It is now the hub of the community, and also provides accommodation for guests. The building itself is Grade II listed and comprises architecture ranging from the 17th through the 19th centuries.

The Wildgoose Nursery at Lower Millichope is a new venture in the Walled Garden of Millichope Park. It was created in 2011 to safeguard the Bouts collection of Perennial Violas, Wildegoose Nursery has gained a reputation for both its violas and an extensive range of perennials and grasses. At the centre of the garden sits the newly restored range of Georgian curvilinear glasshouses; restored with the aid of grants from the Heritage Lottery Fund and The Country Houses Association.

The village does not have a shop (the Post Office which closed in the early 1990s was situated in the Old Bakery), but there is one in the Aston Munslow Garage, one mile away south towards Craven Arms.

== Transport ==
Public bus service: An infrequent bus runs between Lydbury North and Telford, stopping en route at the Crown Inn on Tuesdays. It does not run every week and the timetable varies. There is a local Dial-a-Ride service, The Buzzard which provides transport to nearby towns.

School bus services: During weekdays and term time, two services run between Cardington and Ludlow. They also stop at the Crown Inn.

Rail services: The nearest railway station is Craven Arms. It is 7.0 miles away and has regular services to Shrewsbury.

The nearest airport is Birmingham Airport at just under 60 miles away.

== Governance ==
The village of Munslow is in the parish of Munslow, which also includes Aston Munslow and the hamlets of Broadstone, Hungerford and Beambridge.

== Notable people ==
- The Reverend Francis Stedman, the father of the famous pioneering 17th century change ringer Fabian Stedman was born in Aston Munslow in 1598.
- Judge Edward Littleton (made a peer as Baron Lyttelton of Munslow) was born at Munslow in 1589,
- Victorian architect Samuel Pountney Smith was born at Munslow in 1812.
- The folk singer Fred Jordan (1922–2002) lived at Aston Munslow until 2001.

== See also ==
- Listed buildings in Munslow
