= Stanton Long =

Village in Shropshire, England

Coordinates: 52.512°N 2.631°W

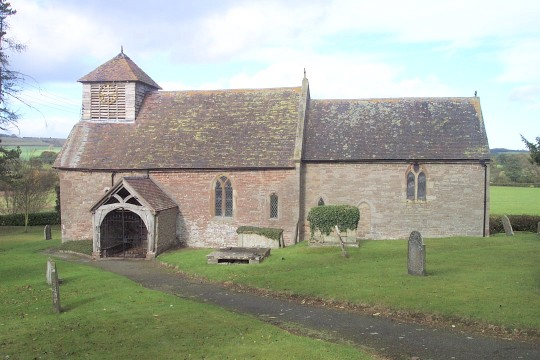
- St. Michael and All Angels Church, Stanton Long

- Location within Shropshire
- Population: 310 (2011)
- OS grid reference: SO571906
- Civil parish: Stanton Long
- Unitary authority: Shropshire
- Ceremonial county: Shropshire
- Region: West Midlands
- Country: England
- Sovereign state: United Kingdom
- Post town: Much Wenlock
- Postcode district: TF13
- Dialling code: 01746
- Police: West Mercia
- Fire: Shropshire
- Ambulance: West Midlands
- UK Parliament: Ludlow

Stanton Long is a small village and civil parish situated in the district of Corve Dale, Shropshire, England. It is one of three parishes in the local area, including Easthope and Shipton. In the National Gazetteer of Great Britain and Ireland 1868, it was described as:

a parish in the hundred of Munslow, county Salop, 7 1/2 miles S.W. of Much Wenlock, its post town, and 10 W. of Bridgnorth. The village, which is small, is situated on the river Corve, and on the road from Skipton to Holdgate. The inhabitants are agricultural. The parish includes the townships of Brocton and Patton.

== History ==
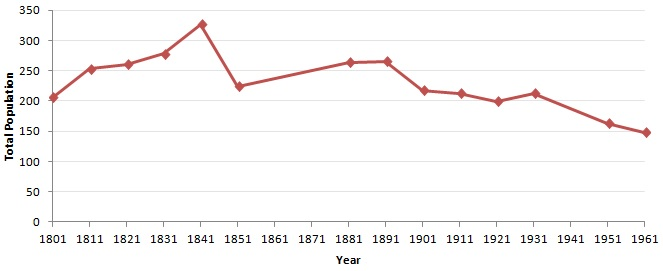
Total Population of Stanton Long Civil Parish, Shropshire, as reported by the Census of Population from 1801 to 1961.

The name Stanton can be interpreted in Anglo-Saxon as a 'Stone farm/settlement', due to the topographic features it resides on. The 'Long' element of the place name refers to the parish's unusually elongated shape. Although the parish boundaries have varied slightly over time, it still preserves its elongated shape to this day. It is restricted by the two nearby parishes of Shipton and Easthope, which causes it to become thin in the middle of the boundary and wider near the north and south borders. The actual settlement of Stanton Long is located in the south and other townships such as Brockton and Patton are in the north. Historically the placename was also written as "Long Stanton".

Stanton Long's history can be traced back to the 13th century according to the 1086 Domesday Book entry, where it was under ownership of Roger de Lacy from Earl Roger de Montgomerie. This entry was then categorised under the parish of Stantune which became separated into two estates; Stanton Long and Holdgate in the 12th century. Back then it was under the hundred of Patton and had a total number of just three households consisting of 1 smallholder and 2 slaves. This was considered a very small settlement compared to other Domesday settlements.

In the 17th and 18th centuries the village was known as 'Dirty Stanton' due to the area's abundance in clay soil, making the roads muddy.

The first census data recorded for the civil parish can be found back in 1801 where it had a total population of 206. This figure grew at a constant rate for the next five decades until 1841 where it reached its peak of 327 inhabitants. Since this period, the population has been slowly declining until the recent census in 2011, where it has been its lowest on record.

There are a number of listed buildings in the parish, all of which were put under the Heritage Protection Reform from the 1970s onwards. Some of these buildings include the Malt House, Lower Farm House and St. Michael and All Angels Church.

== Present day ==
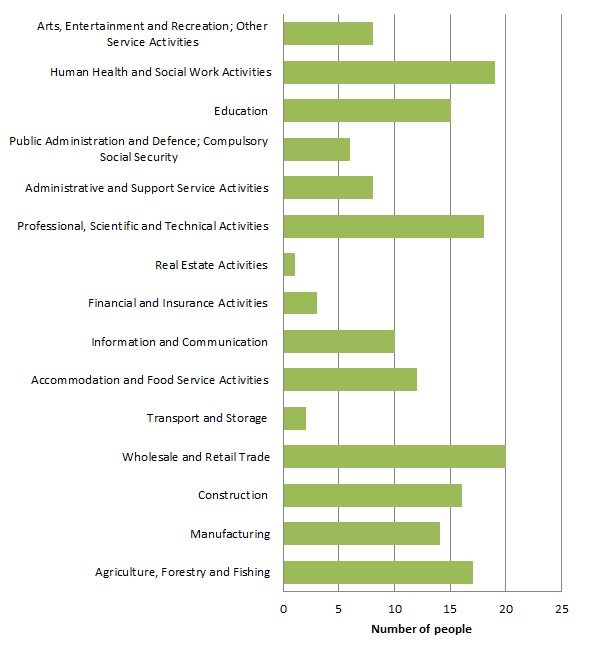
Employment of population in Stanton Long as reported by the 2011 UK Census data

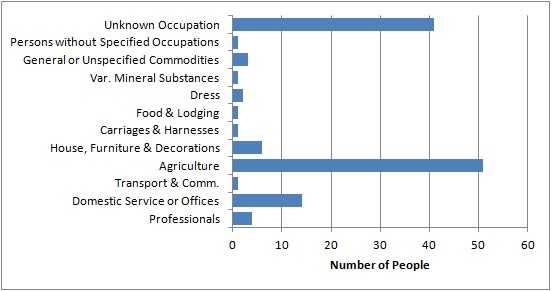
Employment of population in Stanton Long as reported by the 1881 UK Census data

In 2011 the UK Census showed that Stanton Long had a total population of 310. This census data also shows that the Wholesale and Retail trade is the most popular industry in the parish, with other industries such as Human Health and Social Work Activities and Agriculture, Forestry and fishing also receiving similar figures. Although previously, the 1881 census data showed that the Agriculture industry was by far the dominant trade, with over 50 males then involved in that area of work, the industry of the parish has almost certainly transformed into the present day.

In terms of transport services, the nearest bus route that passes through the parish can be accessed via Brockton. Although, the nearest stop to the main village of Stanton Long would be at the nearby village of Shipton. There are only two services passing through this route with limited activity from Monday to Friday.

The local housing is predominantly detached, whole housing or bungalows, which are valued on average at around £240,408 (based on the local outward code).

== Geology ==
The parish is partially located along one of Britain's most important geological sites named Wenlock Edge. The land between Craven Arms and Much Wenlock sits on top of a Silurian limestone ridge, rich in fossil fauna. Fossil species such as corals, brachiopods, trilobites and ostracods exist along this 30 kilometre stretch of limestone, which is identified as a Site of Special Scientific Interest. The edge contains limestone quarries and limekilns as well as ancient woodland making it a popular walking destination.

== Brockton ==
Brockton is a township within the parish and a settlement of similar size to that of Stanton Long. The hamlet is divided by the parish boundary between Stanton Long and Shipton, with the school and pub in Stanton Long and the farm in Shipton. It lies approximately 3.5 kilometres from the centre of Stanton Long and contains the local public house called The Feathers at Brockton and the local primary school for those in the nearby catchment area. Brockton Church of England Primary School was a replacement school built in 1971 to take the place of an old Victorian establishment that once stood there. It is situated to the west of the township, parallel to a small stream which requires crossing a bridge to get into the grounds. The 2011 inspection report from Ofsted shows that the establishment achieved an overall score of 2 (good) and was praised for its knowledgeable staff.

== Places of interest ==
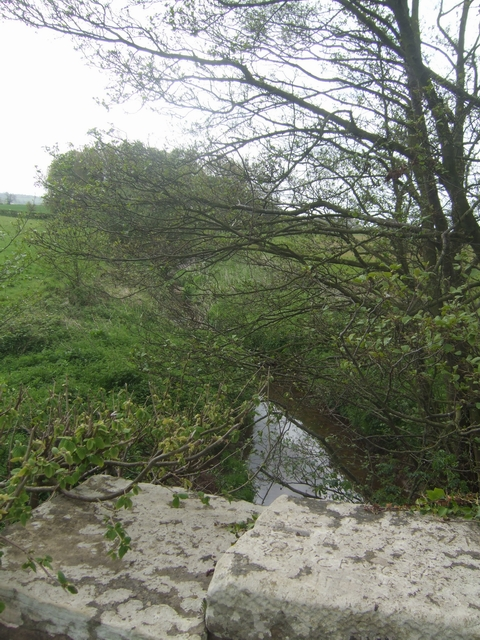
River Corve – downstream of bridge at Brockton – geograph.org.uk – 1282654

St. Michael and All Angels is located in the heart of Stanton Long village and is the second parish church to have served the community. Due to the movement of local residents going southwards, Stanton Long provided a more suitable location than Patton thus justifying the construction of a new parish church. One of its defining features is the entrance door with iron scrollwork. Its construction dates back to the 13th century. Although major repairs were carried out in 1842 and 1869–70, features such as the Bell-cote, bells, Vestry, porch and windows require restoration or repair. The church contains a parish war memorial in form of marble tablet to local men who died serving in both World Wars, and a decorated metal plaque to Wallace Jones (killed in action in Palestine in the First War). The churchyard contains the war graves of a Royal Warwickshire Regiment soldier of World War I and a KSLI soldier of World War II.

The River Corve is a tributary within the Teme drainage basin that reaches typical highs of 2.5 meters and lows of 0.77 meters. The river runs southwards to the east of Brockton and works its way past the nearby village of Shipton to the west of Stanton Long. It then joins the River Teme at the town of Ludlow approximately 8.5 kilometres to the south.

== See also ==
- Listed buildings in Stanton Long
