= Sheet, Shropshire =

Village in Shropshire, England

Coordinates: 52.364°N 2.690°W

Sheet
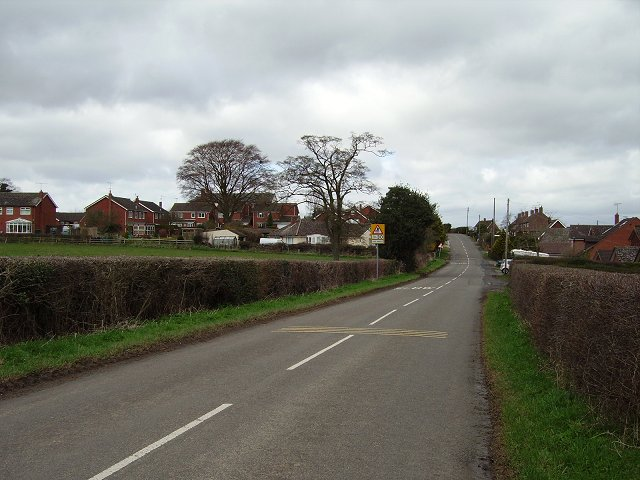
- Sheet

- Location within Shropshire
- OS grid reference: SO530742
- Civil parish: Ludford
- Unitary authority: Shropshire
- Ceremonial county: Shropshire
- Region: West Midlands
- Country: England
- Sovereign state: United Kingdom
- Post town: LUDLOW
- Postcode district: SY8
- Dialling code: 01584
- Police: West Mercia
- Fire: Shropshire
- Ambulance: West Midlands
- UK Parliament: Ludlow

Sheet (or "The Sheet") is a small modern village in the parish of Ludford about 1 mile (1.6 km) from the town centre of Ludlow, Shropshire.

It was mentioned in the Domesday Book of 1086. It was part of the Saxon hundred of Culvestan, which ended in the reign of Henry I, and thereafter Sheet belonged to Munslow hundred.

The A49 road (the Ludlow by-pass) runs through the area, with a roundabout junction for Sheet Road, an unclassified road which begins at the junction of Lower Galdeford and Weeping Cross Lane in Ludlow, runs through Sheet, and heads out to the village of Caynham.

Ludlow's only park and ride (using buses to the town centre) car park site is at Sheet.

The Ledwyche Brook flows just to the east.

== Foldgate ==
Foldgate lies within the Ludlow by-pass but remains within the parish of Ludford, situated between Sheet and the River Teme. There is a new pub run by Marston's — the Squirrel — as well as a Travelodge and a small supermarket and petrol/diesel filling station.
