= Listed buildings in Hopton Cangeford =

Hopton Cangeford is a civil parish in Shropshire, England. It contains four listed buildings that are recorded in the National Heritage List for England. Of these, one is at Grade II*, the middle of the three grades, and the others are at Grade II, the lowest grade. The parish contains the village of Hopton Cangeford and the surrounding countryside, and the listed buildings consist of a farmhouse, a private house, a telephone kiosk, and a redundant church.

== Key ==
Grade	Criteria
II*	Particularly important buildings of more than special interest
II	Buildings of national importance and special interest

== Buildings ==
Name and location	Photograph	Date	Notes	Grade
Lesser Poston Farmhouse; 52.43398°N 2.68065°W	—	16th century (probable)	A farmhouse, later remodelled and reduced, it is in stone, and has a tile roof that is gabled and hipped. There are two storeys and attics, four bays, and a right outshut. The windows in the ground floor are mullioned and transomed, in the upper floor they are casements, and at the rear is a tall stair window. Inside are timber framed partitions.	II
The Cottage; 52.41924°N 2.66684°W	—	17th century	A house, partly timber framed with brick infill, and partly in stone, and with a tile roof. There is a single storey and an attic, and a T-shaped plan, consisting of a hall range and a two-bay cross-wing, and there is a rear lean-to. Above the doorway is a flat canopy, the windows are casements, and there is a dormer.	II
The Old Church; 52.41964°N 2.66528°W		1766	The apse was added in about 1860, and the church is now redundant. It is built in red brick with stone dressings, and has tiled roofs with ornamental ridge tiles. The church consists of a nave, a chancel with a polygonal apse and a hipped roof, and a west tower. The tower has three stages, a round-headed west door, roundels in the top stage, and a cornice at the top. The windows in the nave and tower have round heads, architraves, and pendant keyblocks.	II*
Telephone kiosk 52.41933°N 2.66727°W		1935	A K6 type telephone kiosk, designed by Giles Gilbert Scott. Constructed in cast iron with a square plan and a dome, it has three unperforated crowns in the top panels.	II
