= Listed buildings in Ashford Carbonell =

Ashford Carbonell is a civil parish in Shropshire, England. It contains 32 listed buildings that are recorded in the National Heritage List for England. Of these, two are listed at Grade II*, the middle grade of the three grades, and the others are at Grade II, the lowest grade. The parish contains the village of Ashford Carbonell and the surrounding countryside. Most of the listed buildings are in the village, and include houses with associated structures, cottages, a church and items in the churchyard, a school, and a war memorial. Outside the village they include a bridge, a farmhouse and farm buildings, a former public house and a former malt house, both converted into private houses, an outbuilding, a watermill and a weir, and a house.

== Key ==
Grade	Criteria
II*	Particularly important buildings of more than special interest
II	Buildings of national importance and special interest

== Buildings ==
Name and location	Photograph	Date	Notes	Grade
St Mary's Church; 52.33503°N 2.69840°W		12th century	A Norman church, it was restored in 1882 by Ewan Christian, who also added a porch. It is in sandstone, and has a tiled roof with stone coped gables. The church consists of a nave, a south porch, and a lower chancel. On the west gable is a weatherboarded timber framed bell turret with a pyramidal roof.	II*
Plowsters; 52.33022°N 2.69669°W	—	Late 16th century	A house that was altered in the 17th and 18th centuries, it is in brick with a timber framed rear gable, and a slate roof with serrated bargeboards and fascia. It has two storeys, cellars and attics, and four bays, the outer bays projecting and gabled. Some of the windows are mullioned or mullioned and transomed, and others are casements. The central doorway has a simple canopy.	II
Outbuilding, Malthouse; 52.34591°N 2.69151°W	—	Early 17th century	Originally a cowshed, it is timber framed on a stone plinth, clad in weatherboarding and steel panels. It has a tiled roof, one storey, two bays and extensions at the ends. It contains a door and a small window.	II
Candlelight Cottage; 52.33255°N 2.69923°W		17th century	Formerly three cottages, later combined into one dwelling, it was extended to the left in the 18th century, and to the rear in the 20th century. There are three bays, one storey and attics, and a thatched roof. The right two bays are timber framed on a stone plinth, and the extensions are in stone. The doorway in the left bay has an open gabled porch. The windows are casements, those in the upper floor are thatched dormers. Inside the building are cruck trusses.	II
Outbuilding, Brook House; 52.33181°N 2.69842°W	—	17th century	The outbuilding has been converted into a garage. The first bay is timber framed with rendered brick infill, and the rest is in brick and stone. It has a tiled roof, and one storey.	II
Outbuilding and byre, High Meadow Farm; 52.34263°N 2.69315°W	—	17th century	Originally two houses, with alterations in the 18th and 19th centuries, and later used for other purposes. They are partly in stone and partly in brick, with tiled roofs. On the front is a doorway with a beaded surround and a segmental-arched lintel, and a casement window. At the rear are more casement windows and a doorway, all with segmental heads, and a gabled dormer.	II
Home Farmhouse; 52.33401°N 2.69989°W	—	17th century	The farmhouse, later a private house, has an earlier core. The front is in brick on a stone plinth, and the rear wall is partly timber framed and partly in brick. The roof is tiled with one coped gable. The house has two storeys and an attic, a front of three bays, and a rear extension. On the front is a porch and a doorway with a segmental arch. The windows vary; some are mullioned, some are sashes, and others are casements.	II
Malthouse, Malthouse Cottage, railings and gates 52.34576°N 2.69108°W	—	17th century or earlier	The malt house has been extended and altered in the 17th and 18th centuries to become a private house, and the cottage was added to the left in the 19th century. They are in brick, with some exposed timber framing at the rear of the house, and stone at the rear of the cottage. The roof is slated with coped gables. Both parts have two storeys, the house has three bays, and the cottage has one. The windows are mullioned with segmental heads. In the gable end are dovecote ledges. In front of the building are cast iron railings, gates and gate piers.	II
Barn, Plowsters; 52.33024°N 2.69698°W	—	17th century	Originally a barn and cider mill with domestic accommodation, it has since been used for other purposes. The building is timber framed with weatherboard cladding, and some brick and render infill, all on a stone plinth, and with a slate roof. There are six bays, a carriage entrance, other doorways, and a casement window.	II
The Butts; 52.32958°N 2.69578°W		17th century	The house was later extended. The oldest part is timber framed with rendered infill, the extensions to the left and to the rear are in brick, and the roof is tiled. There is one storey and an attic, four bays, the left bay in brick, and a rear extension. The windows are casements, in the attic are gabled dormers, and in the rear extension is a French window.	II
The Lodge; 52.33001°N 2.69714°W		17th century	The house, which was altered in the 18th century, has a stone ground floor, the upper floor is timber framed, and the roof is slated with bargeboards. There are two storeys, four bays, and a 20th-century extension at the rear. The windows are casements, and in the right return is a two-storey bay window with a hipped roof.	II
The Serpent; 52.34443°N 2.68860°W		17th century	A former public house, later a private house, the main block dates from the 18th century, and a rear extension was added in the 20th century. The earliest part forms a cross-wing at right angles to the main block; all parts have tiled roofs. The earliest wing is timber framed with two storeys, two bays, and casement windows. The main block is in brick, and has three storeys, three bays, and a hipped roof. The windows in the lower two floors are sashes, and in the top floor they are casements, all with segmental heads.	II
Brook House; 52.33181°N 2.69859°W	—	1677	A timber framed house on a sandstone plinth that has a tile roof with serrated bargeboards and fascias. There are two storeys, a cellar and attic, two bays, and a single-bay extension at the end. Steps lead up to the doorway that has a flat-roofed canopy with timber boarding and a coffered roof. The windows are casements.	II*
Group of two memorials 52.33501°N 2.69832°W	—	18th century	The memorials are in the churchyard of St Mary's Church. They are headstones, and consist of rectangular sandstone slabs. The east headstone is set horizontally, and has twin inscribed panels. The west headstone is set vertically, and has a rounded head and foliate decoration.	II
Memorial to Mrs Watters; 52.33504°N 2.69826°W	—	Mid 18th century	The memorial is in the churchyard of St Mary's Church. It is a headstone, and consists of a rectangular sandstone slab set vertically. The memorial has an inscribed face and a carved head.	II
Stables, Plowsters; 52.33009°N 2.69655°W	—	18th century	The building is partly in brick and partly timber framed with weatherboarding, and has a roof of corrugated iron. There are two storeys and three bays. On the front are doorways and a loft door, and at the rear is a mullioned window.	II
Ashford Court; 52.32841°N 2.69960°W	—	Late 18th century	The house was extended to the left in the 20th century. It is in brick on an ashlar plinth, and has a hipped slate roof. There are two storeys with an attic, and a front of five bays. On the front is a portico with two pairs of Tuscan columns, pilasters, and an entablature with a parapet. The windows are sashes with keystones. In the right return and at the rear are two-storey square bay windows with parapets and cornices, and containing mullioned and transomed windows.	II
Stable block, Ashford Court; 52.32811°N 2.69897°W	—	Late 18th century	The stable block is in brick with hipped slate roofs. It has an H-shaped plan, with a central two-storey four-bay block, and flanking single-storey stable wings. It contains carriage entrances, doorways and casement windows, all with segmental heads.	II
Walls and greenhouses, Ashford Court; 52.32803°N 2.69989°W	—	Late 18th century	The wall is in brick with ashlar coping, and contains segmental-headed archways. Inside the garden are two timber framed lean-to greenhouses, one with 20 bays, and the other with five. There is also a store that has a round-arched doorway with a fanlight, and a mullioned window.	II
High Meadow Farmhouse, stables and granary 52.34258°N 2.69277°W	—	Late 18th century	The farmhouse and outbuildings are in brick with dentilled eaves and tiled roofs. The farmhouse has three storeys and three bays, with mullioned and transomed windows under segmental heads. The outbuildings stretch from the rear, forming an L-shaped plan. They have two storeys, and contain casement windows, doorways, and a pitching hole, and there is a flight of external steps.	II
Ashford Bridge; 52.33594°N 2.70577°W		1797	The bridge carries a road over the River Teme. It was designed by Thomas Telford, and is built in stone with brick parapets and piers. The bridge consists of a single segmental arch with a span of 25 metres (82 ft). It has voussoirs, a string course, and buttresses at the abutment. The road approaches on each side are on causeways with round arches.	II
Ashford Mill and Weir; 52.33562°N 2.70365°W		Early 19th century	The watermill is in stone with a tile roof, and has a rectangular plan and various openings. On the front facing the river is an undershot waterwheel 14 feet (4.3 m) in diameter, and a stepped platform incorporating a fish pass. Associated with the mill is a horseshoe weir that feeds water through a leat within the mill. To the west of the mill is an earlier mill that was never completed, in stone with a slate roof and two storeys.	II
Memorial to Thomas McGhie; 52.33496°N 2.69792°W	—	Early 19th century	The memorial is in the churchyard of St Mary's Church, and consists of a sandstone chest tomb. It is on a plain plinth, and has inscribed panels and a plain lid.	II
Memorial to Arabella Yate; 52.33494°N 2.69792°W	—	Early 19th century	The memorial is in the churchyard of St Mary's Church. It is a cast iron chest tomb on a moulded plinth, and has a plain lid with an ornament consisting of an urn with festoons and rosettes. There are applied letters in iron.	II
Woodlands Cottage; 52.34602°N 2.69076°W	—	Early 19th century	A brick house with a slate roof. There are two storeys, a front of three bays, and a rear two-bay extension. In the centre of the front is a doorway with a semicircular fanlight, a bracketed canopy, and a cornice. The windows are sashes with round heads containing Gothick tracery. In the rear wing the windows are casements in the upper floor, and sashes in the ground floor, all with segmental heads.	II
Brook Cottage and railings 52.33188°N 2.69867°W	—	19th century	Originally the service wing to Brook House, later a private house, it incorporates earlier material. The house is in brick and stone, and has a tile roof with serrated fascias and bargeboards. There is one storey and an attic, a front of two bays and a rear wing. The central doorway has a segmental head and a fanlight, and in front of it is a metal canopy on cast iron columns and brackets. There is a tiled gabled dormer, an attic window, one sash window, mullioned windows at the front, and casement windows elsewhere. In front of the house are cast iron railings and a gate.	II
Memorial to Bale Family; 52.33513°N 2.69852°W	—	Mid 19th century	The memorial is in the churchyard of St Mary's Church, and consists of three grave slabs in a cast iron enclosure. The enclosure is decorated with foliage and heraldic patterns.	II
Memorial to James Beaumont; 52.33505°N 2.69818°W	—	Mid 19th century	The memorial is in the churchyard of St Mary's Church, and consists of a sandstone chest tomb. It has a plinth, side panels with decorated borders and corners, corner fluted piers, and a plain lid with a moulded edge.	II
Memorial to C Walker and railings 52.33510°N 2.69835°W	—	Mid 19th century	The memorial is in the churchyard of St Mary's Church, and consists of a sandstone chest tomb surrounded by cast iron railings. The chest tomb is on a plain plinth, and has inscribed panels, fluted corner sections, and a pyramidal lid on a moulded lip.	II
Memorial to Richard Whiteman; 52.33493°N 2.69806°W	—	Mid 19th century	The memorial is in the churchyard of St Mary's Church, and consists of a sandstone chest tomb. It is on a plain plinth, and has inscribed panels, fluted corner sections, and a plain lid.	II
Primary School and House; 52.33468°N 2.70019°W		1872	The school and house are in stone and have tiled roofs with ornamental ridges. The house is incorporated in the north wing. The building has an H-shaped plan, one storey and attics, and facing the road are three gables. The right gable is in the hall, and it contains a stepped triple lancet window, flanked by heraldic crests in recessed tablets. In the centre is a gable over the arched doorway, and the left gable contains a mullioned window in the ground floor, and a mullioned and transomed window above. In the right return are two shaped gables with mullioned and transomed windows.	II
War Memorial; 52.33285°N 2.69933°W		c. 1920	The war memorial is in front of the Village Hall. It is in green sandstone and consists of a boulder with an uneven edge, on a stepped plinth and a rectangular platform. The front of the boulder has a recessed face containing the carving of a sword and a laurel wreath. On the plinth is an inscription and the names of those lost in the First World War.	II
