= Listed buildings in Stanton Long =

Stanton Long is a civil parish in Shropshire, England. It contains eight listed buildings that are recorded in the National Heritage List for England. Of these, one is listed at Grade II*, the middle of the three grades, and the others are at Grade II, the lowest grade. The parish contains the villages of Stanton Long and Brockton, and is otherwise rural. Most of the listed buildings are farmhouses, and the other listed buildings consist of a house, a barn, a church, and a hotel.

== Key ==
Grade	Criteria
II*	Particularly important buildings of more than special interest
II	Buildings of national importance and special interest

== Buildings ==
Name and location	Photograph	Date	Notes	Grade
St Michael's Church; 52.51265°N 2.63264°W		13th century	The church was altered and extended in the following centuries, and there was a major restoration in 1869–71 by S. Pountney Smith. The church is built in sandstone with tile roofs, and consists of a nave with a west porch, a chancel, and a north vestry. At the west end is a large timber framed belfry with a pyramidal roof and a finial.	II*
Manor Farm House; 52.51191°N 2.63210°W	—	16th century	The farmhouse is in stone and brick, and has a tile roof. It is partly in one storey and an attic, and partly in two storeys. There is a south wing, and the windows are casements.	II
Feathers Hotel; 52.54031°N 2.62318°W		17th century	The hotel is partly timber framed, partly in stone, and partly plastered. It has a tiled roof, two storeys, a long rear wing, and it contains casement windows.	II
Lower Farm House; 52.51374°N 2.62724°W	—	17th century	The farmhouse is in timber framing and brick on a stone plinth and has a tile roof. There are two storeys, and the windows are casements.	II
Malt House Farmhouse; 52.51436°N 2.62934°W	—	17th century	The farmhouse is timber framed with restoration in stone and brick, and with a tile roof. There are two storeys, the windows are casements, and there are dormers.	II
Barn, Manor House Farm; 52.51208°N 2.63175°W		17th century (probable)	The barn is timber framed with brick infill and some weatherboarding on a stone plinth, and it has a tile roof. There are ventilation holes in the brickwork.	II
Post Office; 52.51180°N 2.63003°W	—	17th century (probable)	The house is partly timber framed and partly in brick, and has a cedar shingled roof. There is one storey and attics, and the windows are casements.	II
Coates Farm House; 52.51342°N 2.61103°W	—	Early 18th century (probable)	The farmhouse is in brick with a tile roof. There are two storeys, three bays, and a single-storey right wing. The doorway has a cornice hood, the windows are mullioned and transomed and contain casements, and there are two gabled dormers.	II
