= Patton (hundred) =

Historical division of Shropshire, England

Coordinates: 52.553°N 2.615°W

Patton Patinton
- Hundred of Shropshire
- History
  - Origin: Organisation of Mercia into shires
  - Created: early 10th century
  - Abolished: c. 1100-35
  - Succeeded by: Hundred of Munslow
- Status: Hundred
- Government: Caput (in 1066 & 1086)
  - HQ: Corfham (extraterritorial)
- Contained within
  - County: Shropshire
- Subdivisions
  - Type: Tithings & (later) manors
  - Units: 27 manors (in 1086)

Patton was a hundred of Shropshire, England. Formed during Anglo-Saxon England, it encompassed manors in eastern central Shropshire, and was amalgamated during the reign of Henry I (1100 to 1135) with the neighbouring hundred of Culvestan to form the Munslow hundred.

It included the upper Corvedale and the well-populated manors of Wenlock, Stoke and Ditton. The original folkmoot place, which gave its name to the hundred, was Patton, a manor recorded as being part of the hundred in the 1086 Domesday Book.

Patton is written in the Domesday Book variously as Patinton(e) or Patintun(e).

== Norman conquest ==
Following the Norman conquest of England, many of the manors in the hundreds of Patton and Culvestan were owned by Roger de Montgomerie, 1st Earl of Shrewsbury. One of Montgomerie's holdings, Corfham was already by 1066 (when it was held by King Edward) the caput (the centre of administration) not only for Culvestan (the manor of Corfham being in that hundred) but also Patton. It is believed that by the 12th century the caput for both hundreds was moved to another of Montgomerie's holdings, Aston, 1 mile (1.6 km) northwest from Corfham Castle on the other side of the River Corve. Aston (a manor also in Culvestan) was near the tumulus known as Munslow and the place later became known as Aston Munslow.

=== Amalgamation into Munslow ===
During the reign of Henry I (1100 to 1135) the hundreds of Culvestan and Patton were formally merged and the new hundred formed was named Munslow. The new hundred included most of the manors of Culvestan and Patton (not Madeley or Beckbury, which went to Brimstree, nor Acton which went to Stottesdon), together with some from the hundred of Leintwardine which was being dissolved. The hundreds of Shropshire were greatly reformed throughout the 12th century, with the merger of Patton and Culvestan into Munslow being one of the earliest changes made.

The move to Munslow hundred was relatively short-lived for many places, with the growth of the franchise of Wenlock — see the Wenlock Priory section below.

== Domesday Book manors ==
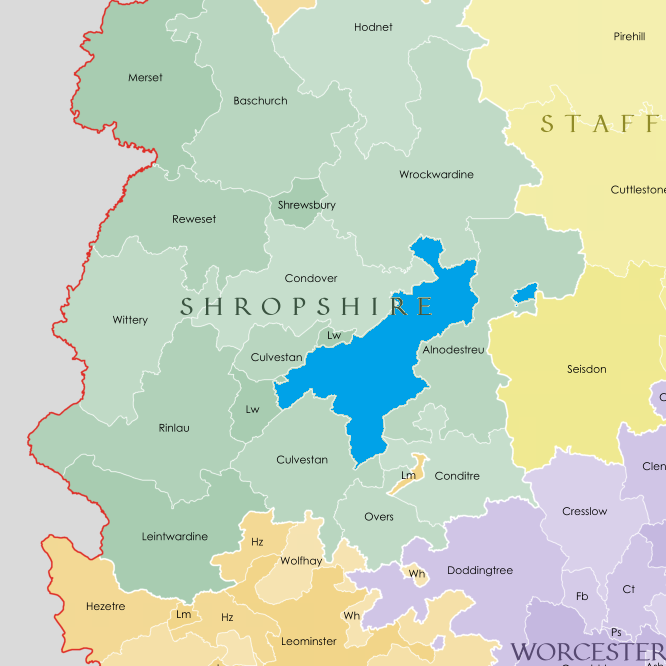
The hundred of Patton (blue) in 1086.

The following 27 manors were listed in the Domesday Book (1086) as belonging to the hundred of Patton. The modern place-names are given by way of extending in brackets the name of the manor. The hundred which the manor became part of after the 12th century reforms is signified (those not marked were transferred to - and then remained part of - Munslow).

- Abdon
- Acton [Round] ṣ
- Beckbury ♦ ŵ
- Bourton ₩
- Brockton
- Buchehale † ŵ
- Clee [St Margaret]
- Ditton [Priors] ŵ
- Easthope
- Gretton
- Holdgate
- Lutwyche
- Madeley ₩
- [Upper] Millichope and Millichope [Park] ŵ
- [Great and Little] Oxenbold ŵ
- Patton ŵ
- Perkley ₩
- Rushbury
- Ruthall
- Shipton ₩
- Stanton [Long]
- Stanway
- Stoke [St Milborough] ₩
- Ticklerton ₩
- Tugford
- [Little] Wenlock ₩
- [Much] Wenlock ₩

† The (exact) location of this manor is lost; probably Monk Hall near Monkhopton.

♦ This manor was a detached part of the hundred.

₩ Held by Wenlock Priory (Bourton: as overlord/tenant-in-chief) and became part of the Wenlock franchise.

ŵ Otherwise became part of the Wenlock franchise (Patton: a part only).

ṣ Became part of Stottesdon hundred.

== Wenlock Priory ==
Wenlock Priory, a monastery founded in the 7th century, is listed separately from the manor of Wenlock. About a third to half of the manors in Patton hundred had close connections with the priory, with eight manors actually held by the priory (see list above). Beckbury was an exclave of Patton hundred and this can be explained by its priory connection, for like Stoke its parish is dedicated to Saint Mildburh (of Wenlock). Ditton became known as Prior's Ditton (and later Ditton Priors) for its connections with the priory. Cleestanton appears to have been an exception in the area, for it was held by the priory but belonged to Culvestan hundred.

Wenlock's priory would, beginning in the 1189-1199 reign of Richard I and to the early 16th century, steadily gain an extensive hundred-like liberty (or franchise) of Wenlock. This hundred was largely based on its land holdings and ecclesiastical connections, and it gained from the newly formed Munslow hundred all such places from the Patton element (and Cleestanton from the Culvestan element), as well as the manors of Madeley and Beckbury which were in Patton but had transferred to Brimstree (see list above).

Some areas would return to Munslow hundred in its enlargement in 1836, as part of reform of the borough of Wenlock.

== See also ==
- History of Shropshire § Hundreds
- List of hundreds of England § Shropshire
- England in the High Middle Ages
