= Ashford Carbonell =

Village in Shropshire, England

Coordinates: 52.33°N 2.70°W

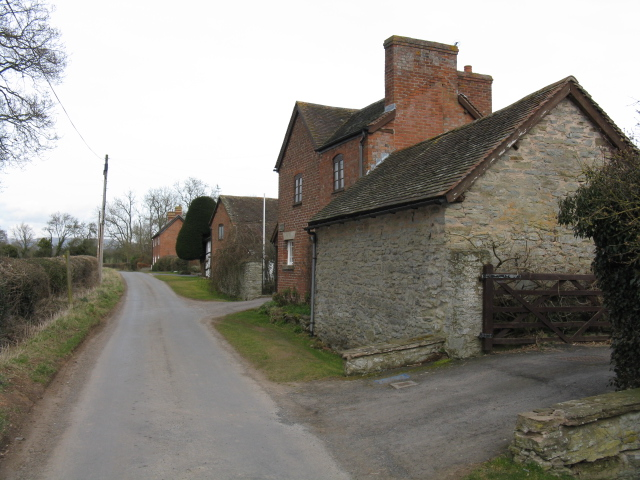
- Cottages On Huntington Lane, Ashford Carbonell

- Location within Shropshire
- Population: 321 (2011)
- OS grid reference: SO5270
- Civil parish: Ashford Carbonel
- Unitary authority: Shropshire
- Ceremonial county: Shropshire
- Region: West Midlands
- Country: England
- Sovereign state: United Kingdom
- Post town: LUDLOW
- Postcode district: SY8
- Dialling code: 01584
- Police: West Mercia
- Fire: Shropshire
- Ambulance: West Midlands
- UK Parliament: Ludlow

Ashford Carbonell (or Ashford Carbonel) is a village and civil parish in south Shropshire, England, near the county border with Herefordshire.

The village lies 2.5 miles (4.0 km) south of the market town of Ludlow, on the eastern side of the River Teme, facing the smaller Ashford Bowdler. The river acts as the boundary between the parishes of Ashford Bowdler and Ashford Carbonel, and is crossed locally by Ashford Bridge, which takes the Caynham Road from the A49 towards Caynham.

The civil parish (which is formally named Ashford Carbonel) had a population of 321 as recorded in the 2011 census; the area covered by the parish is 635 hectares (1,570 acres).

== History ==
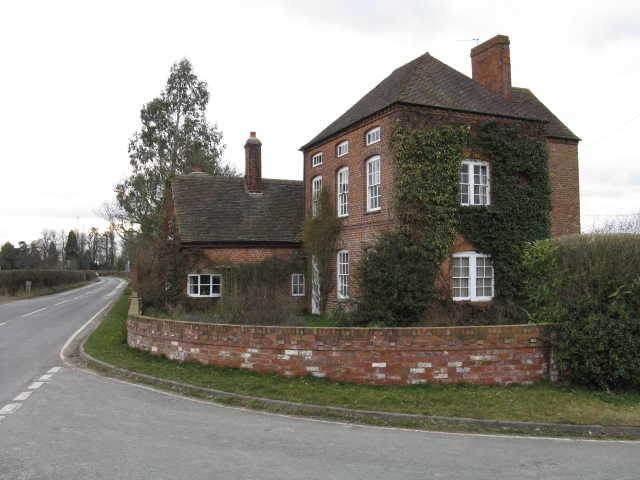
Former public house at The Serpent crossroads, Caynham Road.

Ashford Carbonell formed part of the hundred of Culvestan, which in the 12th century became Munslow. Part of the parish (Huntington and The Serpent) however instead became part of the hundred of Stottesdon.

Huntington was a manor mentioned (separately to Ashford Carbonell) in the Domesday Book (1086). Today it is a small hamlet just outside the village. The Serpent is a former pub which gave its name to a crossroads on the Caynham Road, located midway between the villages of Ashford Carbonell and Caynham but within the parish of Ashford Carbonell. Stretton Reeve (1907-1981), Bishop of Lichfield, lived in retirement at Huntington Green.

The parish church, dedicated to Saint Mary Magdalene, is Norman in origin.

== Education ==
On 1 November 2011, a new £3m primary school (the "Bishop Hooper School") opened on the edge of the village, which replaced the village's previous primary school and the primary school in neighbouring Caynham.

== See also ==
- Listed buildings in Ashford Carbonell
