= Hopton Cangeford =

Village in Shropshire, England

Coordinates: 52.419°N 2.667°W

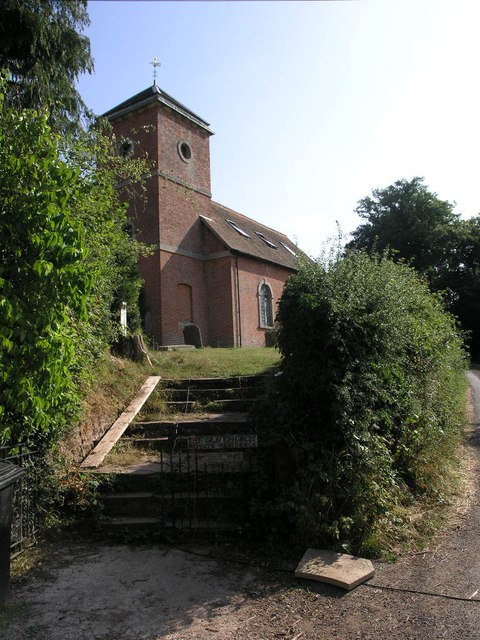
- The eighteenth-century former church, designed by T. F. Pritchard

- Location within Shropshire
- OS grid reference: SO546803
- Civil parish: Hopton Cangeford
- Unitary authority: Shropshire
- Ceremonial county: Shropshire
- Region: West Midlands
- Country: England
- Sovereign state: United Kingdom
- Post town: LUDLOW
- Postcode district: SY8
- Dialling code: 01584
- Police: West Mercia
- Fire: Shropshire
- Ambulance: West Midlands
- UK Parliament: Ludlow

Hopton Cangeford, also referred to as Hopton-in-the-Hole, is a small village and civil parish in south Shropshire, England.

The small parish includes Lesser Poston and Greater Poston; both were manors recorded in the Domesday Book of 1086 (Hopton Cangeford was not). They formed part of the Saxon hundred of Culvestan. They are situated to the north of Hopton Cangeford village.

Hopton Cangeford was historically an outlying part of Stanton Lacy parish. It belonged to (after the dissolution of Culvestan c. 1100) the hundred of Munslow.

The father of painter Charles Wellington Furse was the perpetual curate of the parish.

== See also ==
- Listed buildings in Hopton Cangeford
