= Overton, Shropshire =

Coordinates: 52.344°N 2.727°W

Overton
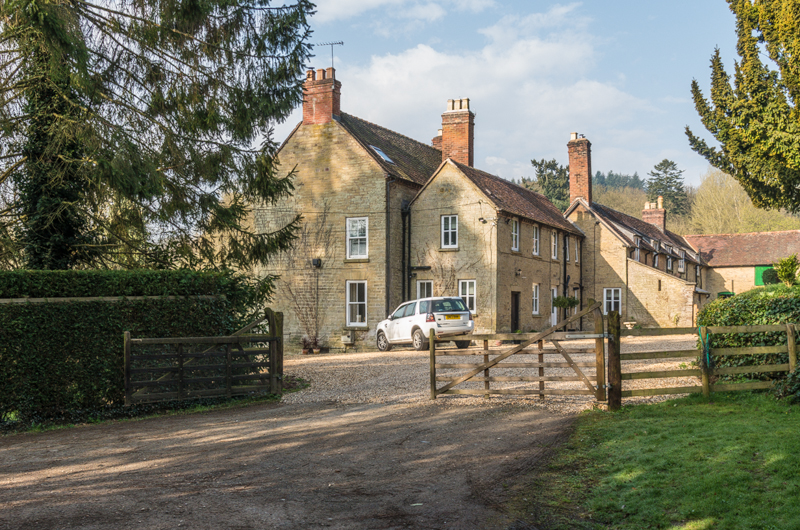
- Overton House

- Location within Shropshire
- OS grid reference: SO504720
- Civil parish: Richard's Castle (Shropshire)
- Unitary authority: Shropshire
- Ceremonial county: Shropshire
- Region: West Midlands
- Country: England
- Sovereign state: United Kingdom
- Post town: LUDLOW
- Postcode district: SY8
- Dialling code: 01584
- Police: West Mercia
- Fire: Shropshire
- Ambulance: West Midlands
- UK Parliament: Ludlow

Overton is a small village in south Shropshire, England.

Overton lies west of the River Teme, 1.5 miles (2.4 km) south of the town of Ludlow and close to the border with Herefordshire. The B4361 (until 1979 the A49) road runs through. It is in the civil parish of Richard's Castle (Shropshire), the village to its south.

In the Domesday Book it is recorded as the manor of Avretone, which included Richard's Castle. This manor at the time was recorded as belonging to the hundred of Cutestornes, a hundred of Herefordshire. Around the time of Henry I (1100-1139) the hundreds of Shropshire were greatly reformed and the hundred of Munslow was created; this hundred took in Overton.

== See also ==
- Listed buildings in Richard's Castle (Shropshire)
