= Munslow (hundred) =

Hundred of Shropshire, England

Coordinates: 52.475°N 2.7°W

- Hundred of Shropshire
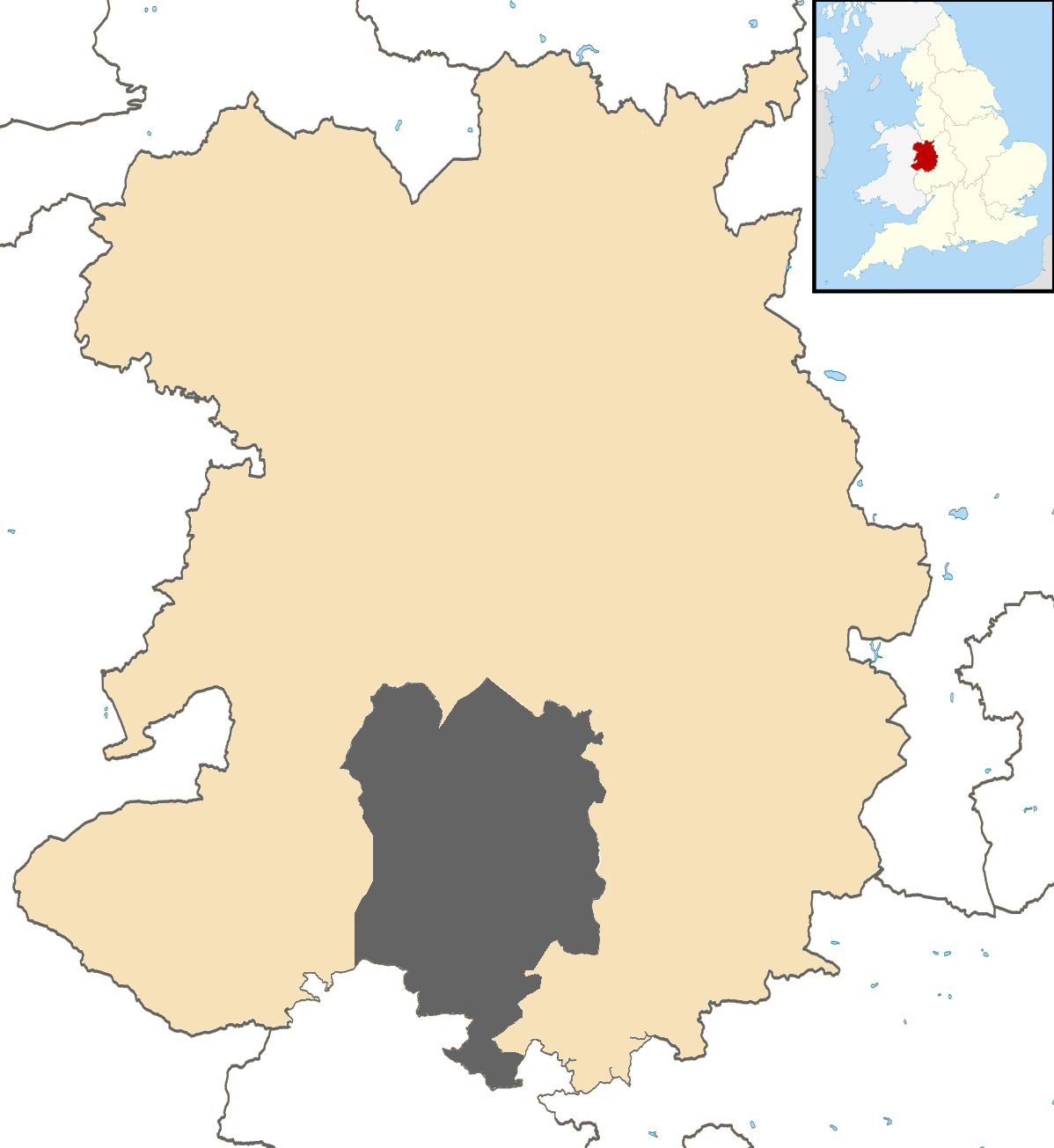
- Munslow shown (in grey) within Shropshire
- Area
  - 1831: 84,500 acres (34,200 ha)
  - 1868: 103,750 acres (41,990 ha)
- Area transferred
  - c. 1200: Places with Priory connection to Wenlock
  - 1836: Five from Wenlock's detached parts
- 1895: Ludford (remainder) from Wolphy
- History
  - Preceded by: Anglo-Saxon hundreds of Culvestan & Patton
  - Origin: 12th century reforms of the county's hundreds
  - Created: c. 1100-35
  - Succeeded by: elected parish & district councils (Local Government Act 1894)
- Status: Hundred (obsolete since 1895)
- Government: Hundred court
  - HQ: (Aston) Munslow
- Contained within
  - County: Shropshire
- Subdivisions
  - Type: Divisions
  - Units: Upper and Lower

Munslow is a hundred of Shropshire, England. It was formed with the amalgamation of the Anglo-Saxon hundreds of Patton and Culvestan during the reign of Henry I (1100 to 1135). Hundreds in England had various judicial, fiscal and other local government functions, their importance gradually declining from the end of manorialism to the latter part of the 19th century.

The hundred is named after the village of Munslow, where the hundred's judicial and administrative functions were mostly carried out. The 'hundred house' for Munslow hundred was originally located in neighbouring Aston Munslow, but from the Tudor period was located in Munslow itself.

== Geography ==
The hundred was divided into "upper" and "lower" divisions (the "lower" division being considerably larger). The hundred reached from All Stretton to the north, down the valleys of the rivers Onny, Corve and Teme, to the Herefordshire border south and west of Ludlow.

Three towns came to exist in the hundred — Ludlow (established alongside Ludlow Castle in the early 12th century), Church Stretton (granted a market charter in 1214) and Craven Arms (which grew as a railway town in Victorian times).

The hundred has no detached parts, although the part consisting of Richard's Castle, Ashford Carbonell and Ashford Bowdler was practically detached, until the transfer of the remainder of Ludford in 1895. The liberty of Wenlock had three true enclaves within Munslow (the main part of the parish of Eaton together with Millichope, secondly the parish of Shipton, and a tiny third enclave being the township of Norncott) until reform of its borough in 1836 incorporated these parts into Munslow.

== Formation ==
The Domesday Book records that following the Norman conquest of England, many of the manors in the hundreds of Culvestan and Patton came to be owned by Roger de Montgomerie, 1st Earl of Shrewsbury, including the manors of Corfham and Aston. Corfham was already by 1066 (when it was held by King Edward) the caput (the centre of administration) for both Culvestan and Patton. It is believed that by the 12th century the caput for both hundreds was moved to Aston, 1 mile (1.6 km) northwest from Corfham Castle on the other side of the River Corve. Aston was near the tumulus known as Munslow and the place later became known as Aston Munslow.

The hundreds of Shropshire were greatly reformed throughout the 12th century, and one of the earliest changes to be made was the formation of Munslow. During the reign of Henry I (1100 to 1135) the hundreds of Culvestan and Patton were formally merged (having been paired by a common caput for some time) and the new hundred formed was named Munslow. The new hundred included most of the manors of Culvestan (not Huntington, which went to Stottesdon) and Patton (not Madeley or Beckbury, both which went to Brimstree — nor Acton, which went to Stottesdon). In addition a number of manors from the hundred of Leintwardine (which was being dissolved) were transferred, with a boundary between the new hundreds of Munslow and Purslow taken to be the Roman road running from Wistanstow south to the Herefordshire border (and explains why Rowton and Shelderton were in different hundreds to the rest of their respective parishes). Also brought into Munslow was a part of the parish of Richard's Castle, causing a division between Shropshire and Herefordshire there that still exists.

=== Later transfers to Wenlock ===
The move to Munslow hundred was relatively short-lived for many places, with the growth of the franchise (or liberty) of Wenlock beginning in the 1189-1199 reign of Richard I — see the section in the Patton article. The resulting hundred of Munslow (following the removal of places to Wenlock) resembled quite closely the former hundred of Culvestan (with for example the upper division based on the former hundred's detached part in the vicinity of the Strettondale) as around half of the Patton element was removed.

== Parishes in 1824 ==
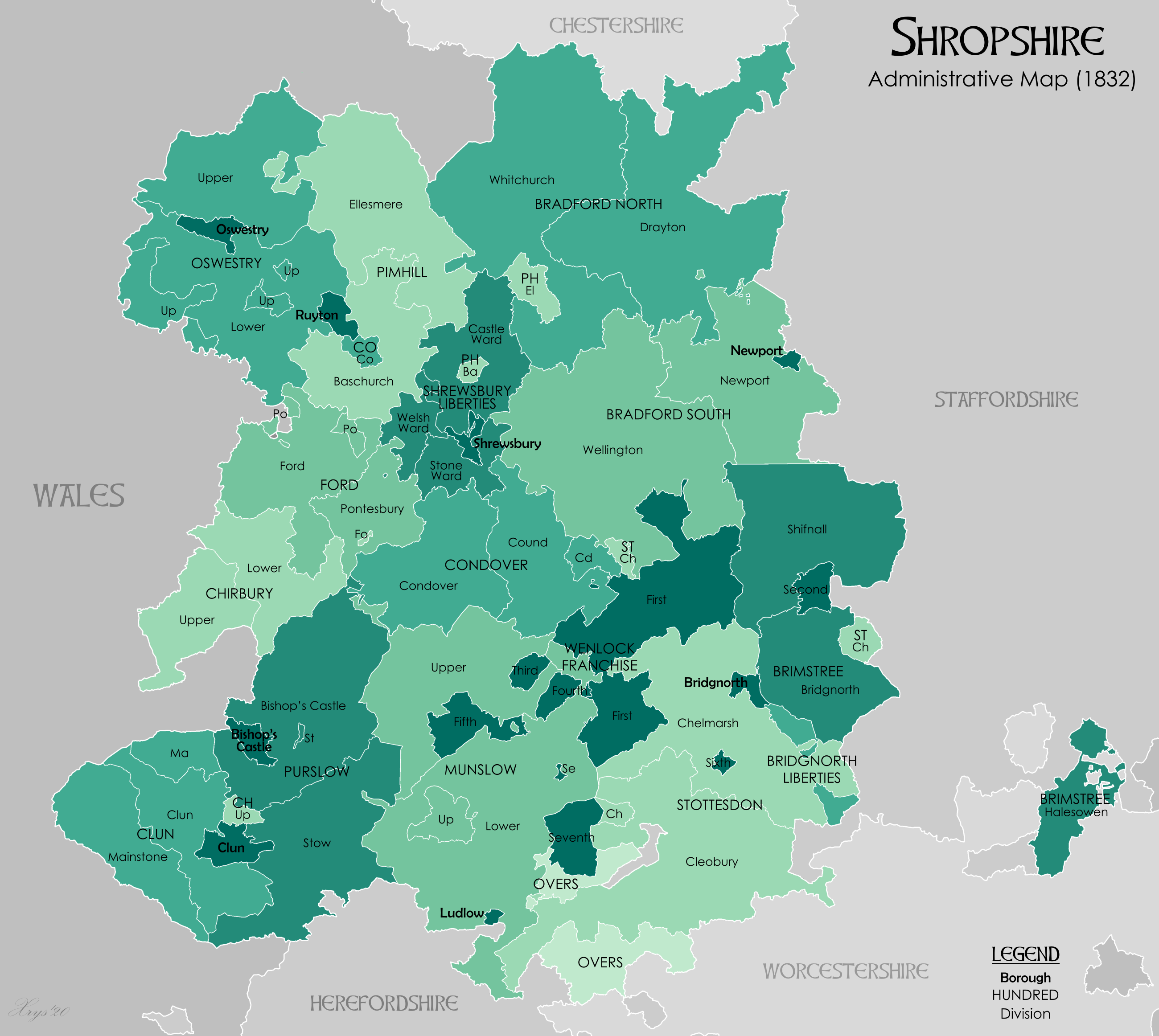
Hundreds of Shropshire in 1832

The following parishes, or parts, formed the hundred in 1824, as recorded by A Gazetteer of Shropshire. This represents the area covered by the hundred for much of its history, from circa 1200 to 1836. The Saxon hundreds which these places originated from prior to the formation of Munslow is given (♦ from Culvestan hundred; ‡ from Patton hundred; ¤ from Leintwardine hundred; ◌ from Cutestornes hundred).

=== Upper Division ===
- Acton Scott ¤
- Cardington (Broome, Holt Preen and Comley in Condover) ♦ (Cardington) ‡ (Gretton) ¤ (Plaish)
- Church Stretton ♦
- Hope Bowdler ♦
- Rushbury ‡
- Wistanstow (Felhampton, Strefford, Whittingslow and the eastern part of Wistanstow only; remainder in Purslow) ¤

=== Lower Division ===
- Abdon ‡
- Ashford Bowdler ♦
- Ashford Carbonel (Huntington and The Serpent in Stottesdon) ♦
- Bitterley (Lower Ledwyche and Middleton only; remainder in Overs and Stottesdon) ♦
- Bromfield ♦
- Clee St. Margaret ‡
- Clungunford (Shelderton only; remainder in Purslow) ¤
- Cold Weston ♦
- Culmington ♦
- Diddlebury ♦
- Ditton Priors (Ruthall only; remainder in Wenlock) ‡
- Easthope ‡
- Holdgate ‡
- Hopton Cangeford ♦
- Ludford (Holdgate Fee, Steventon and the Sheet only; remainder in Wolphy) ♦
- Ludlow [borough] ♦
- Ludlow Castle ♦
- Munslow (Millichope in Wenlock) ♦
- Onibury ♦
- Richard's Castle (Batchcott, Mitnell, Overton and Woofferton only; remainder in Wolphy) ◌
- Stanton Lacy ♦
- Stanton Long ‡
- Stoke St. Milborough (Heath only; remainder in Wenlock, including Norncott) ‡
- Stokesay (Rowton in Purslow) ♦
- Tugford ‡

==== Borough of Ludlow ====
Ludlow was a borough from 1461 to 1974 (a municipal borough from 1835; a rural borough from 1967) which encompassed the same area as Ludlow's parish until the mid-late 19th century; its borough status meant it was largely autonomous from the hundred.

==== Hundred in 1831 ====
The land area covered by the hundred of Munslow in 1831 was 84,500 acres (34,200 ha).

== Enlargement in 1836 ==
The Municipal Corporations Act 1835 reformed the borough of Wenlock and several of its parishes, and parts of, which were detached parts of its liberty, were transferred to other hundreds in 1836.

Munslow gained Eaton-under-Heywood (two detached parts) and Shipton (though not its tiny detached part of Skimblescott) to its Upper Division.

The remainders of Stoke St. Milborough (Cleestanton, Norncott, et al.) and Munslow (Millichope), as well as The Skirmage (a tiny extra-parochial place which bordered onto Stoke St. Milborough; also written as 'Scirmidge') transferred to its Lower Division.

These areas were returned to Munslow after having become part of the liberty of Wenlock in medieval times; they were in Munslow hundred upon its formation c. 1100 and derive from manors originally transferred to Munslow from Patton and Culvestan (only the manor of Cleestanton) hundreds.

=== Hundred in 1868 ===
The land area covered by the hundred of Munslow was recorded in 1868 at 103,750 acres (41,990 ha) with the Lower Division having 69,670 acres (28,190 ha) and the Upper Division 34,080 acres (13,790 ha).

== Enlargement in 1895 ==
In 1895, around the same time as the hundred became defunct, and as a result of the same 1894 Act of Parliament, the Herefordshire element of the parish of Ludford joined Shropshire, which also meant a transfer from Herefordshire's Wolphy hundred to that of Munslow.

== Present-day ==
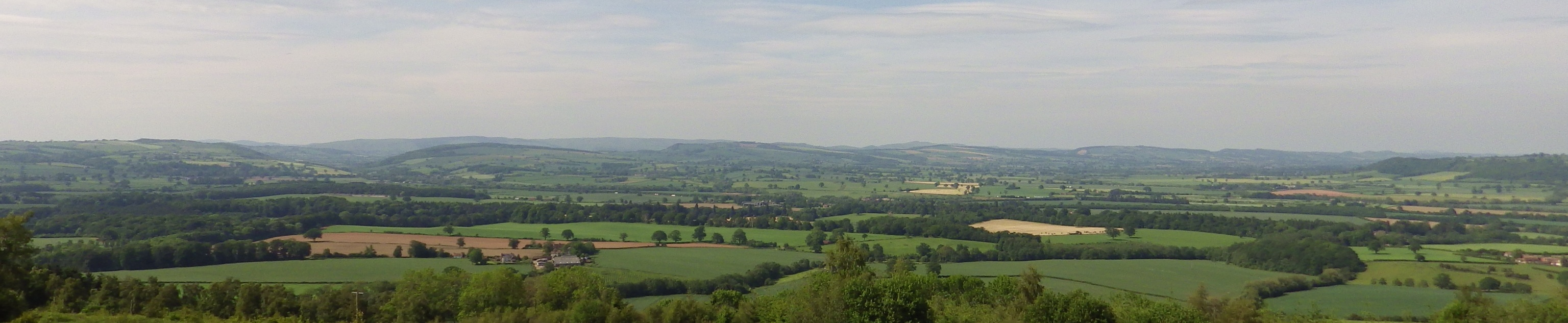
The hundred in 2014, with the wide Corvedale on the right and the much narrower Onny valley seen on the left; the Teme flows left to right across the panorama, with Bromfield in the centre.

Although never formally abolished, the hundreds of England have become obsolete. They lost their remaining administrative and judicial functions in the mid-to-late 19th century, with the last aspects removed from them in 1895 with the Local Government Act 1894.

The Act established a new system of local government within the counties, consisting of civil parishes and districts, both with elected councils. The districts steadily amalgamated and since 2009 Shropshire has only two, both unitary authorities, meaning the county currently has no level of local government between the county and the parish.

== See also ==
- History of Shropshire § Hundreds
- List of hundreds of England § Shropshire
