= Culvestan =

Hundred of Shropshire, England

Coordinates: 52.46°N 2.7°W

- Hundred of Shropshire
- History
  - Origin: Organisation of Mercia into shires
  - Created: early 10th century
  - Abolished: c. 1100-35
  - Succeeded by: Hundred of Munslow
- Status: Hundred
- Government: Caput (in 1066 & 1086)
  - HQ: Corfham Castle
- Contained within
  - County: Shropshire
- Subdivisions
  - Type: Tithings & (later) Manors
  - Units: 28 manors (in 1086)

Culvestan was a hundred of Shropshire, England. Formed during Anglo-Saxon England, it encompassed manors in central southern Shropshire, and was amalgamated during the reign of Henry I (1100 to 1135) with the neighbouring hundred of Patton to form the Munslow hundred.

The hundred of Culvestan centred on the lower Corvedale but also included the Strettondale, and stretched from Cardington in the north to Ashford in the south. At the time of the Domesday Book (1086) it betwixt Leintwardine hundred (which stretched northwards in the vicinity of the Roman road towards Wroxeter).

The manors of Aldon, Bromfield, Stanton and Stokesay were notably well-populated manors in Culvestan as recorded in the Book. Stanton had the greatest population in the county measured by number of households, as well as the fourth-greatest monetary value. The four, plus Onibury, occupied an expansive area at the confluences of the Corve and Onny with the River Teme.

== Etymology ==
The name consists of two elements; "Culve" and "stan", the second element being Old English for a stone (such as a boundary or standing stone). The meaning of the first element is much less certain, and may derive from a personal name, possibly Cuthwulf. The stone presumably referred to the original folkmoot place, for it was common for Anglo-Saxon communities to meet at a specific moot hill, tree or stone, and many Anglo-Saxon hundreds are then named after that specific place. However for Culvestan it is not known where this original meeting place was, other than within the bounds of the hundred (which may have shifted by the time of the Domesday survey).

The manor of Culmington in the hundred has a similar name but it is not clear whether the two share a common toponymy, with Culmington's name possibly deriving instead from "the estate of Cuthhelm". The Domesday Book recorded two slightly different spelling variants of the hundred's name — twice as Colmestan(e) and once as Comestane — which are more similar to Culmington (which was spelled as Comintone). However this is believed to be the possible result of assimilation to the name of Culmington by the scribe.

== Norman conquest ==
Following the Norman conquest of England, many of the manors in the hundreds of Culvestan and Patton were owned by Roger de Montgomerie, 1st Earl of Shrewsbury, including the Culvestan manors of Corfham and Aston. Corfham was already by 1066 (when it was held by King Edward) the caput (the centre of administration) for both Culvestan and Patton. It is believed that by the 12th century the caput for both hundreds was moved to Aston, 1 mile (1.6 km) northwest from Corfham Castle on the other side of the River Corve. Aston was near the tumulus known as Munslow and the place later became known as Aston Munslow.

=== Amalgamation into Munslow ===
The hundreds of Shropshire were greatly reformed throughout the 12th century, with the merger of Culvestan and Patton into Munslow being one of the earliest changes made. During the reign of Henry I (1100 to 1135) the hundreds of Culvestan and Patton were formally merged and the new hundred formed was named Munslow. The new hundred included most of the manors of Culvestan (not Huntington, which went to Stottesdon) and Patton, together with some from the hundred of Leintwardine which was being dissolved.

Cleestanton, due to its connections with Wenlock Priory, would later form part of the franchise of Wenlock — see the section in the Patton article. The resulting hundred of Munslow (following the removal of places to Wenlock) resembled quite closely the hundred of Culvestan, as around half of the Patton element was removed.

Culvestan continued to be a name used to describe the lower Corve valley for at least a century after the formal amalgamation of the hundred into Munslow.

== Domesday Book manors ==
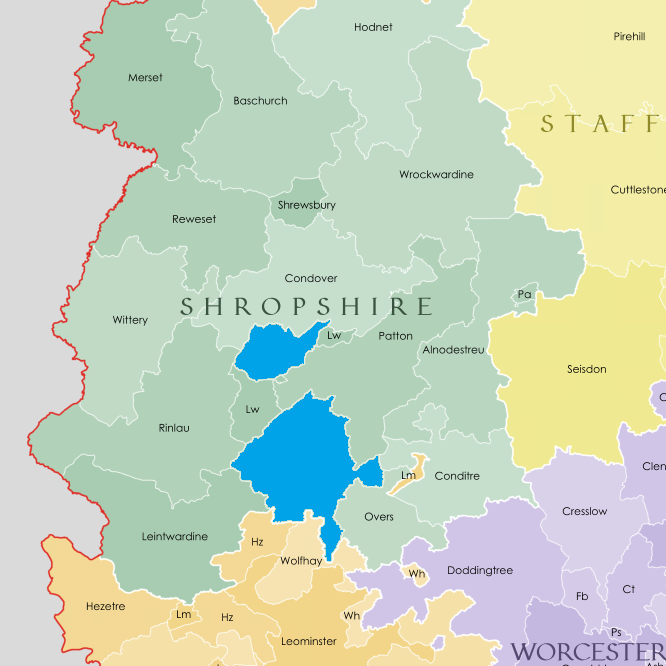
The hundred of Culvestan (blue) in 1086; the hundred bordered Herefordshire to the south.

The following 28 manors were listed in the Domesday Book (1086) as belonging to the hundred of Culvestan. The modern place-names are given by way of extending in brackets the name of the manor. The two manors that did not become part of Munslow hundred are marked.

- Aldon
- Ashford [Carbonell]
- Aston [Munslow]
- Bouldon
- Bromfield
- Cardington ♦
- Cleestanton ₩
- Corfham (caput)
- Corfton
- Culmington
- Hope [Bowdler] ♦
- Huntington ṣ
- [Upper] Ledwyche
- Marston
- Middlehope
- Middleton
- Onibury
- [Lesser] Poston
- [Greater] Poston
- Siefton
- Stanton [Lacy]
- Sutton [Little]
- Sutton [Great]
- Steventon
- Stokesay
- [Church/Little/All] Stretton ♦
- The Sheet
- Westhope

₩ Held by Wenlock Priory and became part of the Wenlock franchise.

ṣ Became part of Stottesdon hundred.

♦ These three manors together formed a detached part of the hundred (caused by Ticklerton belonging to Patton due to its connection with Wenlock Priory; Cleestanton appears to have been an exception in not belonging to Patton).

=== Boroughs and towns ===
At the time of the Domesday survey, there were no formal towns or boroughs in Culvestan, though Ludlow Castle had begun construction; Ludlow itself developed (in the southern corner of the manor of Stanton) as a planned town during the 12th century, possibly in existence in the final years of Culvestan as a hundred. Church Stretton (the principal settlement in the Strettondale) was granted a market charter about a century after the hundred's abolition, in 1214.

=== Religious establishments ===
Bromfield Priory, a college of secular canons founded before 1061, has a separate entry in the Domesday Book to the manor of Bromfield. Superior churches existed at Diddlebury (Church of St Peter) in the manor of Corfham, Bromfield (St Mary the Virgin's Church) and Stanton (Church of St Peter).

== Present-day ==
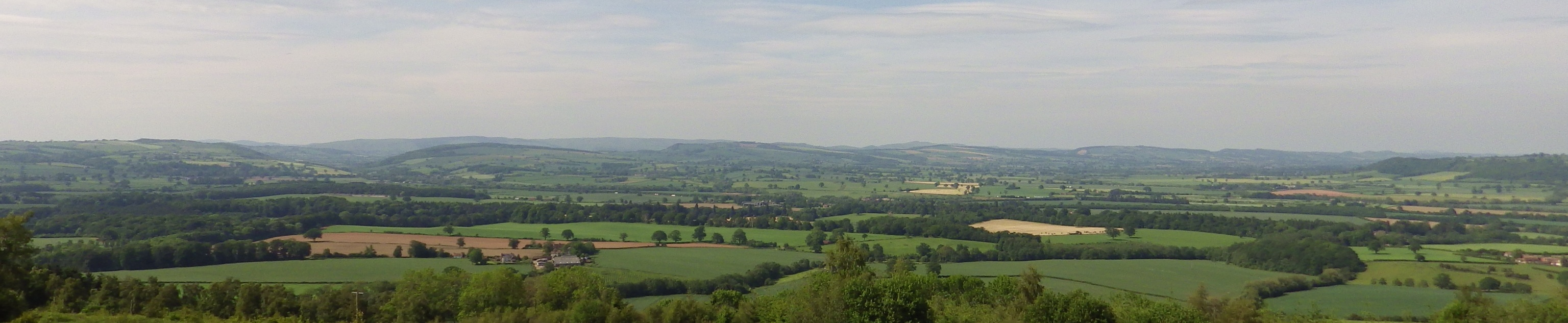
The hundred in 2014, with the wide Corvedale on the right and the much narrower Onny valley seen on the left; the Teme flows left to right across the panorama, with Bromfield in the centre.

Culvestan is not a name in use in modern times. It is sometimes written as Culvestone (the Old English stan translated to modern English) in contemporary works. The entire area covered by the hundred in 1086 continues to be within Shropshire and (with the exception of Huntington) in the hundred of Munslow, with Cleestanton returned to Munslow in an enlargement in 1836.

== See also ==
- History of Shropshire § Hundreds
- List of hundreds of England § Shropshire
- England in the High Middle Ages
