= History of Shrewsbury =

History of the English town

The town of Shrewsbury in Shropshire, England, has a history that extends back at least as far as the year 901, but it could have been first settled earlier. During the early Middle Ages, the town was a centre of the wool trade, and this was a peak in its importance. During the Industrial Revolution, comparatively little development took place in the town, although it did serve as a significant railway town after the development of rail transport in the area. The town today retains much of its historic architecture.

== Foundation ==
Evidence of Neolithic occupation dating back before 2,000 BC of a religious form, was discovered in 2017 in the grounds of a church, the Greek Orthodox medieval Church of the Holy Fathers in Sutton, making it Britain's oldest place of worship.

It is believed the area of Shrewsbury was settled in the 5th century by refugees from the nearby Roman City of Viroconium Cornoviorum, but the first physical evidence dates from the 7th century Saxons.

Shrewsbury was probably founded as a town in the 8th century by the Saxon rulers of Mercia, who needed a fortified burh to control the Severn river-crossing on the road between the burhs of Hereford and Chester. It replaced the large Roman fortified town of Viroconium Cornoviorum only 5 miles to the southeast at modern day Wroxeter. Unfortunately no records survive of the exact date of foundation. Shrewsbury comes from the Saxon name "Scrobbesbyrig". Within the river loop Roman coins and pottery have been found, potentially indicating either small scale settlement or a route across the meander. Natural fords existed across the River Severn near to the present day English and Welsh Bridges which would have permitted travel across the meander. The ford near the Welsh Bridge existed just downstream of where the bridge is today, where Water Lane in Frankwell meets the river (this lane being one of the town's most ancient street alignments). Where the English Bridge is, the confluence of the Rea Brook with the Severn creates a wide, shallow area of water which was readily fordable. It is here, where the present day street "Coleham Head" exists, that an island known as Coleham Island existed. It is believed to be a possible site of early Saxon settlement.

The earliest written mention of the town existing is from the year 901, when it was described as being a city. At that time it was part of the Kingdom of Mercia and was an important border post between the Anglo-Saxons and the Britons in Wales. By the reign of Athelstan (925–939) coinage was being issued, indicating that the town was fortified at this point as having a mint at this time required by law that the location be fortified. It grew in stature quickly and became the county town of Shropshire by the beginning of the 11th century. By 1066, the mid-11th Century, the town consisted of more than 250 houses, and had four churches: St Chad's, St Mary's, St Alkmond's, and St Julian's, of which at least the first three were minsters.

== Middle Ages ==
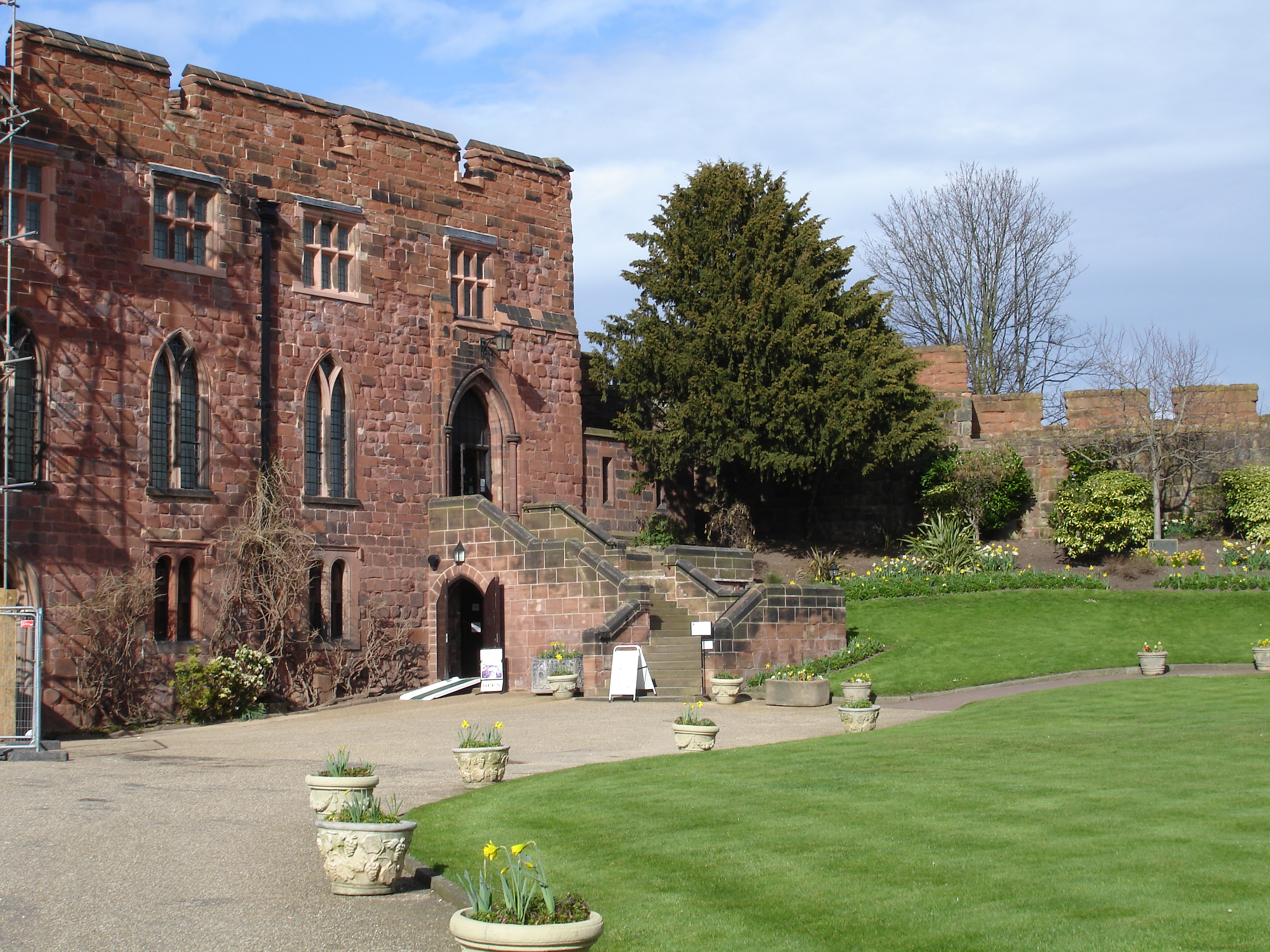
Shrewsbury Castle today

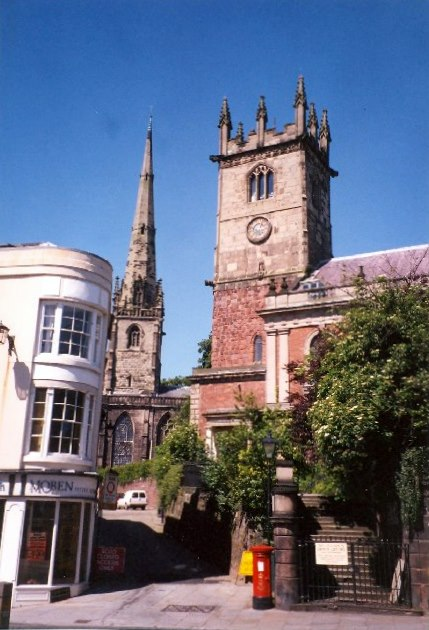
St Julian's and St Alkmund's Churches, Shrewsbury

The Normans built a wooden fort at Shrewsbury, but in 1069, an alliance of Welshmen and the men of Cheshire laid siege to it. A force led by Brian of Brittany and William fitz Osbern was sent to relieve the garrison, but before they arrived, the rebels had burned the town and dispersed. Roger de Montgomery, a relative of William the Conqueror, was created first Earl of Shrewsbury, and in 1074 began building a castle where the present Shrewsbury Castle is now, as well as founding the Abbey (1083). The castle was built on a defensive site occupying the only land entry into Shrewsbury, the rest of the town being enclosed by a loop in the River Severn. Later the settlement was walled for added protection, the remains of which can be found throughout the town, most notable remains of the wall are on the side of the town wall gardens along the river.

The centre of Shrewsbury is located in a meander of the River Severn and the town is located only 9 miles from the Welsh border. The town centre has a pronounced hill on the north side of the meander where the neck of the meander is, upon which sits the castle, though the present day castle dates from the 13th century. The original town probably only occupied the summit of the hill, but it was probably extended southwards in the 13th century, as the town received a grant in 1218 of murage, a toll to build town walls, the first in England. It also received one of the earliest grants of pavage in 1266, "for paving the paving of the new market place" removed from the churchyard of St Alkmund and St Juliana. There are many well-preserved half-timbered black-and-white houses here, among them the Abbot's House of c.1500 on Butcher Row, and Rowley's House (onetime home to the Shrewsbury Museum and Art Gallery) on Barker Street.

The town fell to Welsh forces led by Llywelyn the Great in 1215 and again in 1234; after both attacks the defences were greatly increased. In 1283 Edward I held a Parliament, the first to include a House of Commons, at Shrewsbury Abbey to decide the fate of Dafydd ap Gruffydd, the last free Welsh ruler of Wales. Dafydd was executed – hanged, drawn and quartered – for high treason in Shrewsbury.

Shrewsbury is often regarded as having reached its height in the late Middle Ages, in terms of its national and economic significance. This was largely down to its position as a centre of the woollen trade, being a centre for the finishing of Welsh cloth. Shrewsbury merchants bought cloth, which had been woven and fulled but not finished, such as friezes and plains, in Oswestry market. After finishing, much of it was sent by road to London for sale.

== 16th and 17th Centuries ==
Later, after the formation of the Church of England, it is believed that the town was offered the status of cathedral city by Henry VIII, as the part of a proposed "Diocese of Shropshire". Reputedly, the citizens of the town rejected this offer, preferring to remain a "first of towns", this being the source of the term "Proud Salopian", that refers to a resident proud of Shrewsbury the way it is.

As a result, a number of grand edifices, including the Ireland's Mansion (built 1575) and Draper's Hall (1658), were constructed. It was also in this period that Edward VI gave permission for the foundation of a free school, which was later to become Shrewsbury School, initially built in Castle Gates, a site it occupied until moving to its present site in the suburb of Kingsland in 1882.

The first history of Shrewsbury was written in 1616 by Oliver Mathews, a Welsh apothecary and burgess of Shrewsbury, though later historians such as Hugh Owen and John Brickdale Blakeway describe it as containing "strange and unauthorised assertions".

During the English Civil War, the town was a royalist stronghold and only fell to Parliament forces after they were let in by a traitor at the St Mary's Water Gate (now also known as Traitor's Gate), leading to capture of the Castle. During this period (1640s and 50s) Richard Baxter the English Puritan church leader, (born at nearby Rowton in 1615) was an energetic campaigner for the establishment of a University, which would only have been the third in England, in Shrewsbury, utilising the then Shrewsbury School buildings, but insufficient funding prevented success.

The town has, historically, produced some significant food products, including the most popular recipe for Simnel cake and Shrewsbury Biscuits (or Shrewsbury Cakes), an often lemon flavoured biscuit, which were originally produced in a bakery in the centre of the town.

== Industrial Revolution ==
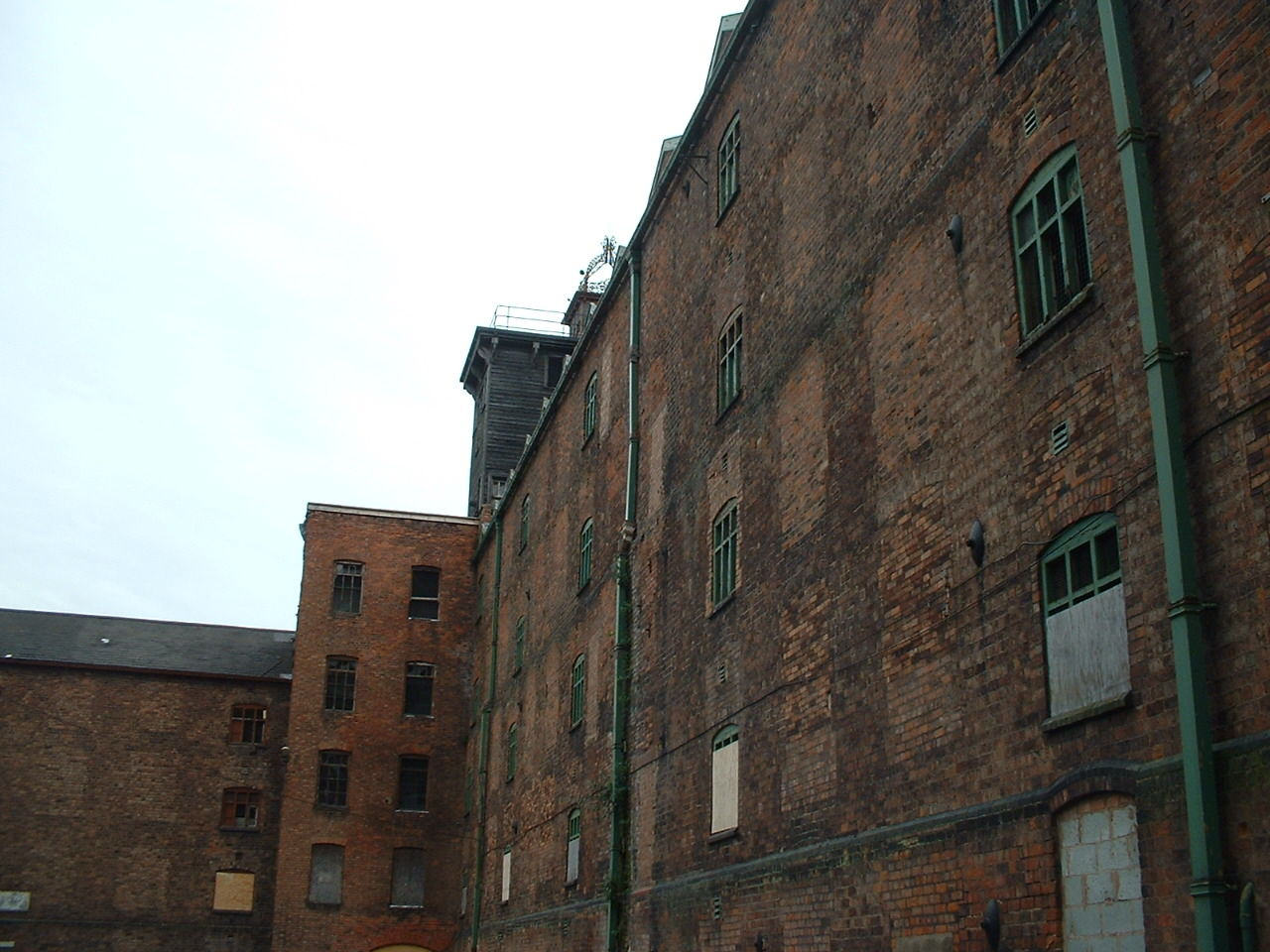
Reverse of Ditherington Flaxmill

The town did not experience the same massive growth that other English towns experienced during the Industrial Revolution and few large factories grew up in the town. Despite this, the world's first iron-framed building, the Ditherington Flax Mill was built in the town in 1797. During the 1830s and 1840s, the town decreased in population mainly due to the lack of good transport links and little industry. The railways, however, became a major employer by the end of the 19th century, as Shrewsbury became an important railway town. Today, the town is still not heavily industrial and the railways no longer play such a major part in employing its people.

== 20th Century ==
The town was scarcely bombed in World War II, the only deaths occurring in 1940 when a woman and two grandchildren were killed when a cottage was hit in Ellesmere Road, so many of its ancient buildings remain intact and there was little redevelopment apart from some significant cases of lack of building conservation and the losses of many important medieval buildings as well as the Victorian market hall that were replaced with mid-century buildings not befitting a medieval county town, in the 1960s and 1970s.

The town played a role in the Cold War, hosting a regional headquarters of the Royal Observer Corps (HQ 16 Group ROC) in the town until the Corps was dissolved in 1995. Located near the Abbey on Holywell Street, the protected and atomic-bomb hardened Nuclear reporting blockhouse was jointly built by the Home Office and MOD in 1962 and operated continuously until 1992, and is now a veterinary practice.

It is known as the "town of flowers" and an alternative name is Salop (Salopia is the alternative name for the county). Shrewsbury's Welsh name is Amwythig.

== 21st century ==
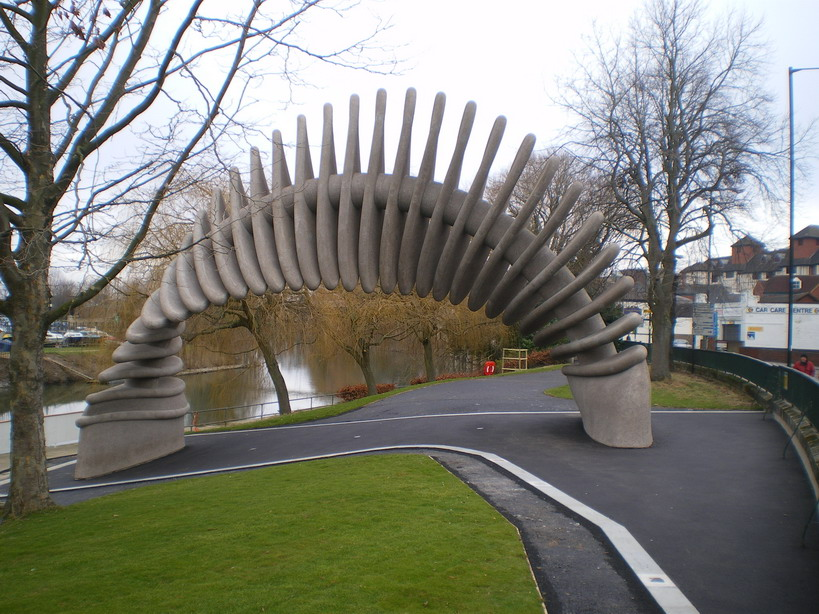
The Quantum Leap was unveiled in the town on 2009, for the bicentennial of the birth of Charles Darwin.

The town had borough status for many centuries and it was run by the Corporation of Shrewsbury. Between 1974 and 2009 the two local authorities were Shrewsbury and Atcham Borough Council (the district level authority) and Shropshire County Council (the county level). Since 1 April 2009 however the town no longer has borough status and the sole local council is the county-wide unitary authority Shropshire Council. With this reorganisation, the town was parished and now has a town council.

== See also ==
- Pengwern
- History of England
- History of Shropshire
