= Mountfields, Shrewsbury =

Area of Shrewsbury, England

Coordinates: 52.712250°N 2.756961°W

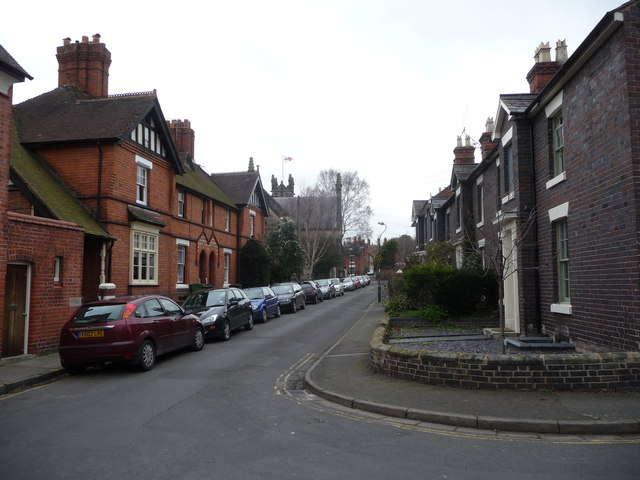
A street in Mountfields

Mountfields is an area in Shrewsbury, England, just north of the Welsh Bridge.

== History ==
Historically famous for pubs and brothels frequented by barge pullers after being paid on Frankwell Quay, Mountfields is now better known as the location of Shrewsbury's Theatre Severn.

Mountfields forms part of the Frankwell area and has a rich history, much of which relates to the original Welsh Bridge (a.k.a. St George's Bridge) which crossed the Severn opposite the medieval street 'Mardol' 70m upstream from the current bridge. The quayside, from which a shanty-type industrial area known as 'Frankwell Forge' was forcefully cleared in 2004, still houses 'The Stew', a derelict building named after a nearby brothel that is the area's only remaining link with the town's history as a river port. The Stew has notoriously been trapped in planning controversies regarding renovation since 2004.

== Darwin Trail ==
The Darwin Trail passes through Mountfields, following the River Severn along the track used by the barge pullers, from the theatre to Charles Darwin's childhood home at The Mount. It passes through fields that Darwin explored when escaping from Shrewsbury School, which he hated. His father Robert Darwin and mother Susannah Wedgwood built the house on land originally earmarked for Shrewsbury prison (which was instead built at The Dana). They constructed a 'thinking path' from the house down to the river and encouraged Charles and his siblings to utilise it. In 2014, the Shropshire Wildlife Trust purchased an area that a part of the Thinking Path ran through.

The trail extends through countryside to the proposed river crossing of Shrewsbury North West Relief Road, a project that may involve the felling of the 550 year old "Darwin Oak" that has attracted over a thousand objections at planning stage.
