= St George's Bridge =

Bridge in Shrewsbury, England

Coordinates: 52°42′37″N 2°45′24″W

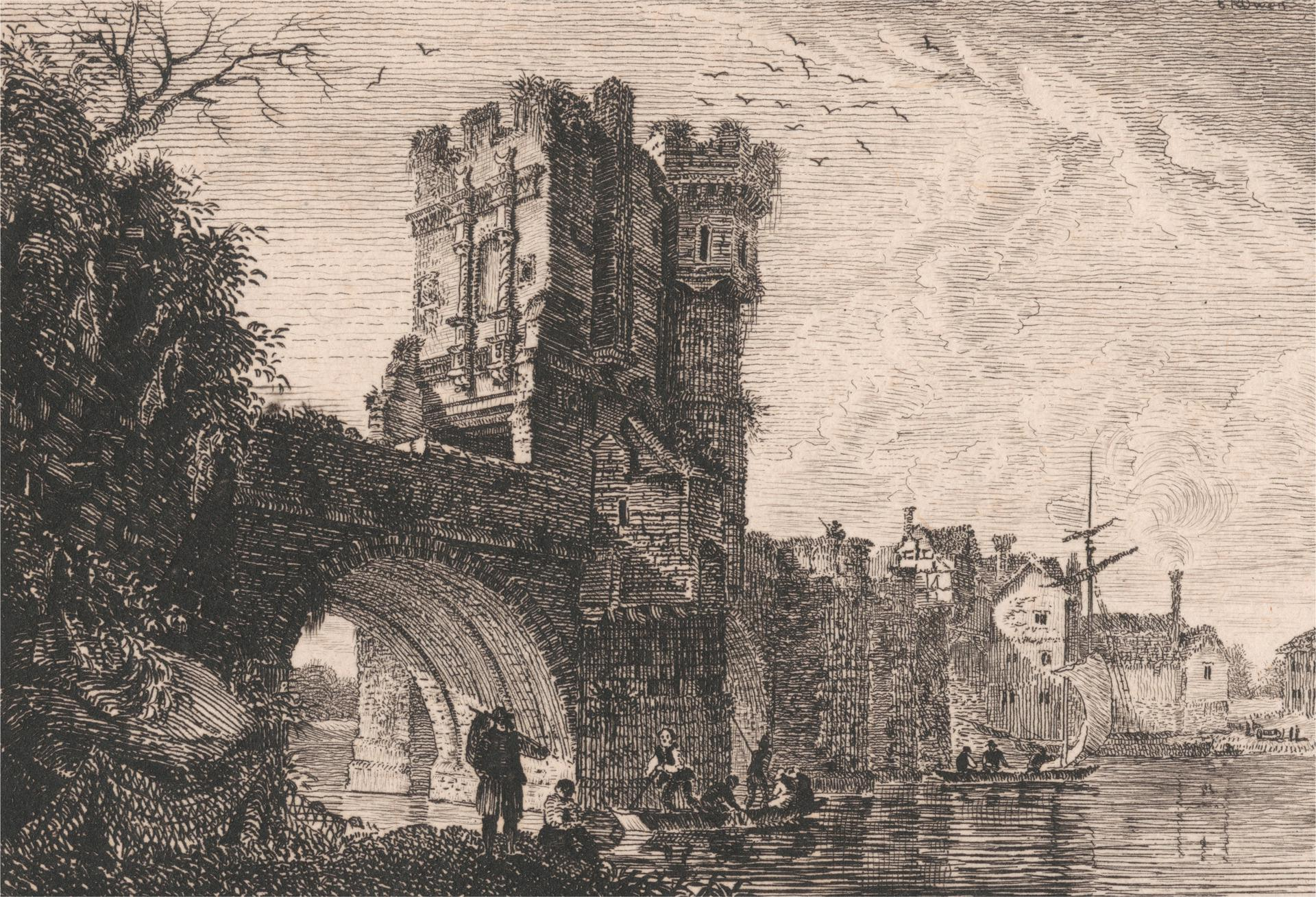
Gate House of the Old St George's Bridge in Shrewsbury: this was the tower which departure from the town was under

St George's Bridge was a bridge over the River Severn in Shrewsbury, England; so named as it was close to the medieval St George's Hospital. It connected Frankwell, an old suburb of the town, to the town centre via Mardol. The gate on the town side was called Mardol Gate and is located where the Mardol Quay Gardens are. The gate on the other side was called Welsh Gate or St George's Gate. The bridge, sometimes now known as the Old Welsh Bridge, was demolished in 1795 and was replaced with the Welsh Bridge.

== History ==
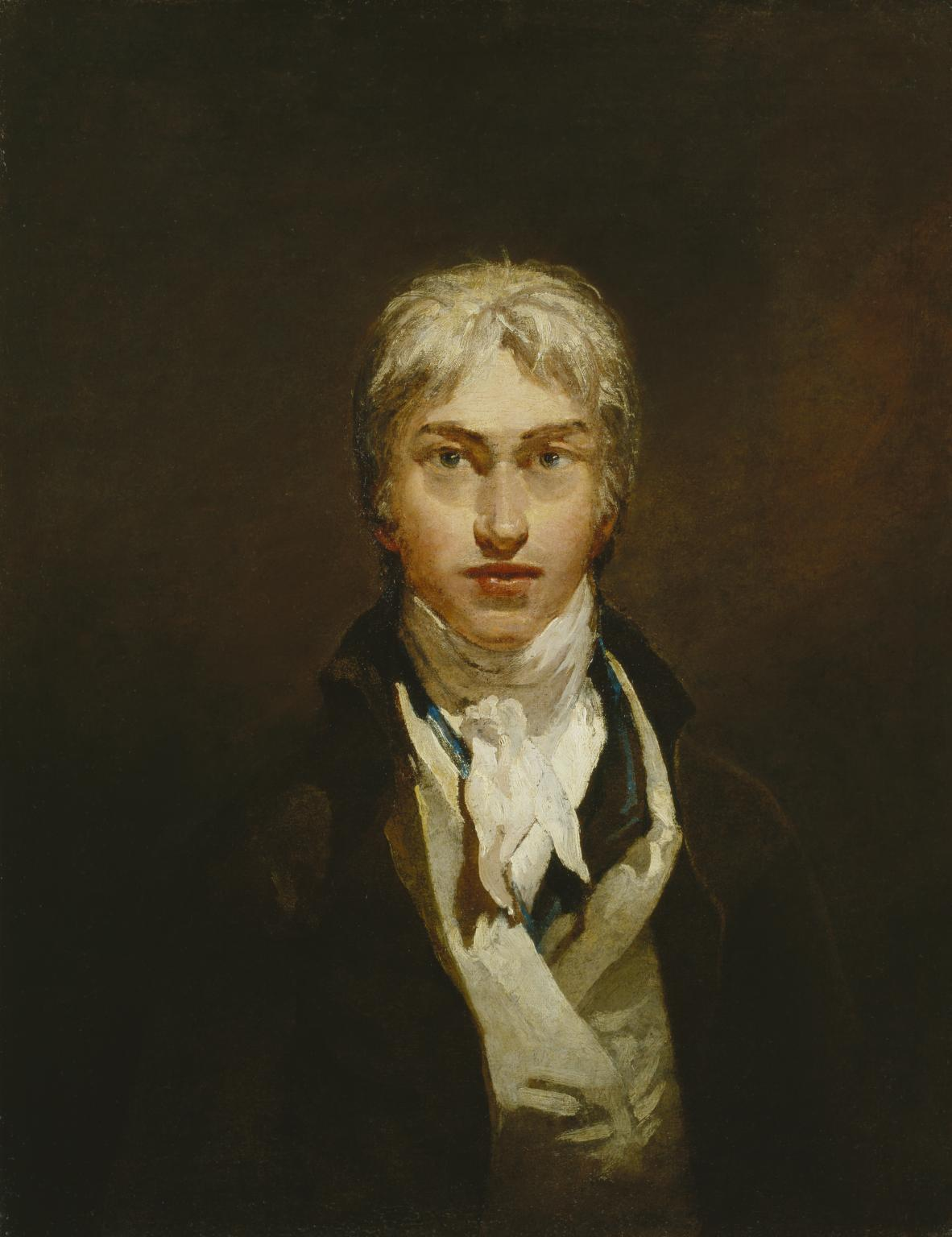
Turner painted the bridge

The bridge's date of construction is believed to have been about 1262.

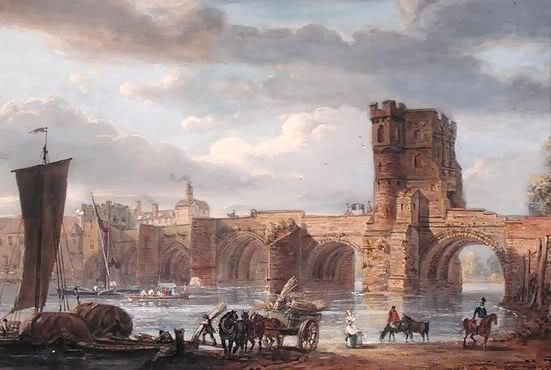
St George's Bridge or the Old Welsh Bridge

The bridge was variously described as Walshebrugge (in 1336), and Walshemanne's brigge (in 1351). A public convenience was built on it in about 1496. One span was a timber drawbridge, while several shops had been built near the middle of the bridge. It is recorded that one tower was still in existence until late in the bridge's life. Above the main tower was a statue of Richard Plantagenet, removed in 1791.

In 1539 John Leland described it as follows:

... the greatest, fayrest and highest upon the streame is the Welsh Bridge having 6 great Arches of Stone, soe called because it is the Way out of the Towne into Walles. This Bridge standeth on the West Syde of the Towne, and hath at the one End of it a great Gate to enter by into the Towne, and at the other End towardes Wales a might strong Towre to prohibit Enimies to enter into the Bridge.

The bridge was painted by J. M. W. Turner in 1794.

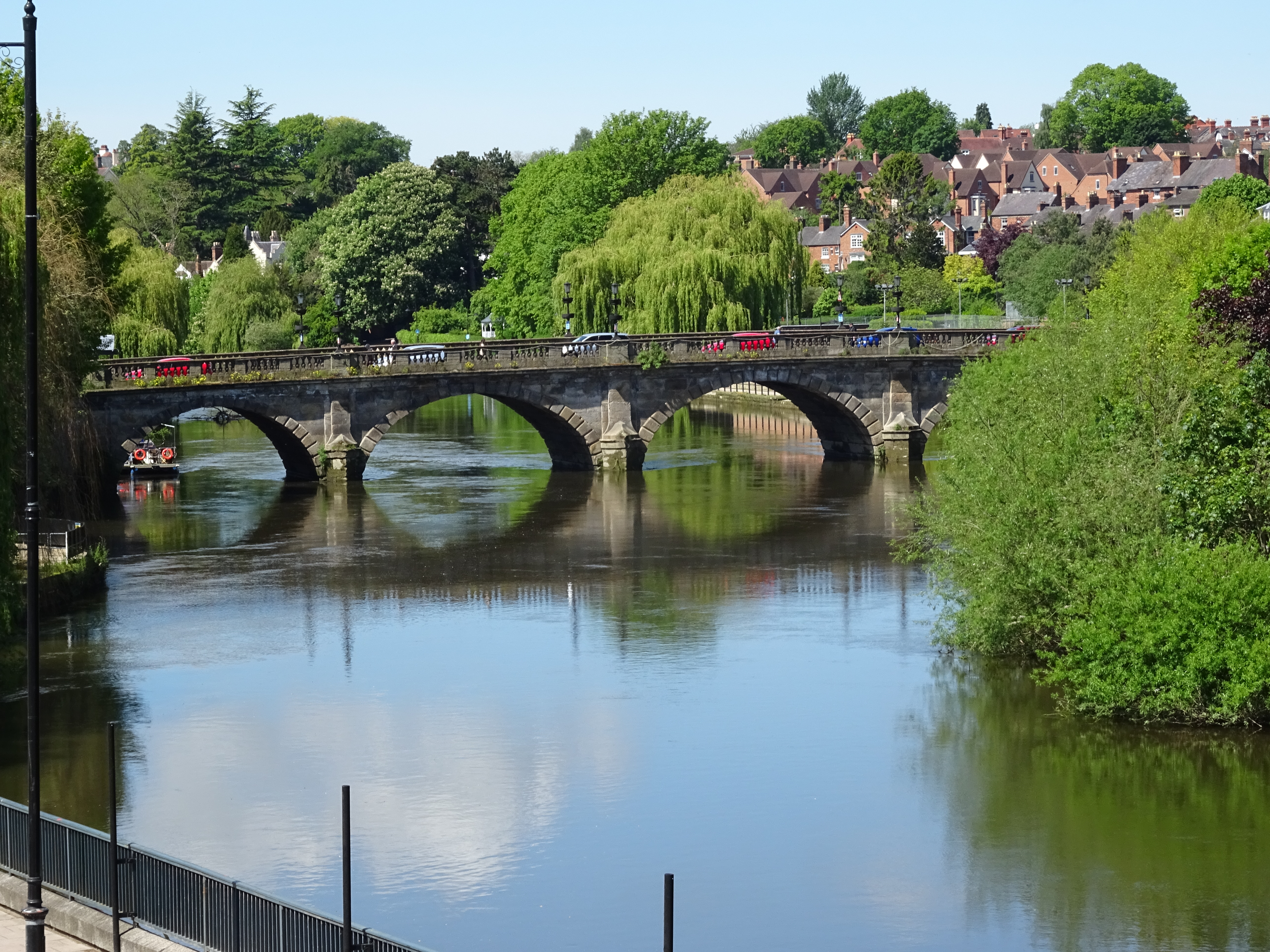
The Welsh Bridge: the replacement

The Welsh Bridge however was built about 80 yards (73m) further downstream, connecting Barker Street (at what was Cripple Lode Gate) with Frankwell. This bridge remains to this day and still carries traffic over the Severn. The section of Barker Street which is on the bridge end has been called Bridge Street since the building of the new bridge.

In 2004, the council installed an information board about the history of the bridge and Mardol, at the bottom of Mardol on the approach to the site of the bridge. Only one dry arch of the old St George's Bridge now remains, on the Frankwell side. The arch was excavated during the construction of Theatre Severn in the late 2000s and is preserved within its foundations.

Saint George is the patron saint of England. It is also given to the (CofE) church in Frankwell, which is within walking distance of the Welsh Bridge/site of St George's Bridge.

== See also ==
- English Bridge
- Crossings of the River Severn
- History of Shrewsbury
- History of Shropshire

== Bibliography ==
- New discoveries at Frankwell site
- Blackwall, Anthony, Historic Bridges of Shropshire, Shropshire Libraries, 1985, ISBN 0-903802-31-7
- Jervoise, E., Ancient Bridges of Wales & Western England, EP Publishing Ltd., 1976, ISBN 0-7158-1152-5, first published 1936
