= Mardol =

Mardol may refer to:

- Mardol (street), in Shrewsbury, Shropshire, England
- Mardol, Goa, India
