= Shrewsbury Prison =

Former prison in Shrewsbury, Shropshire, United Kingdom

Coordinates: 52°42′43.70″N 2°44′51.29″W

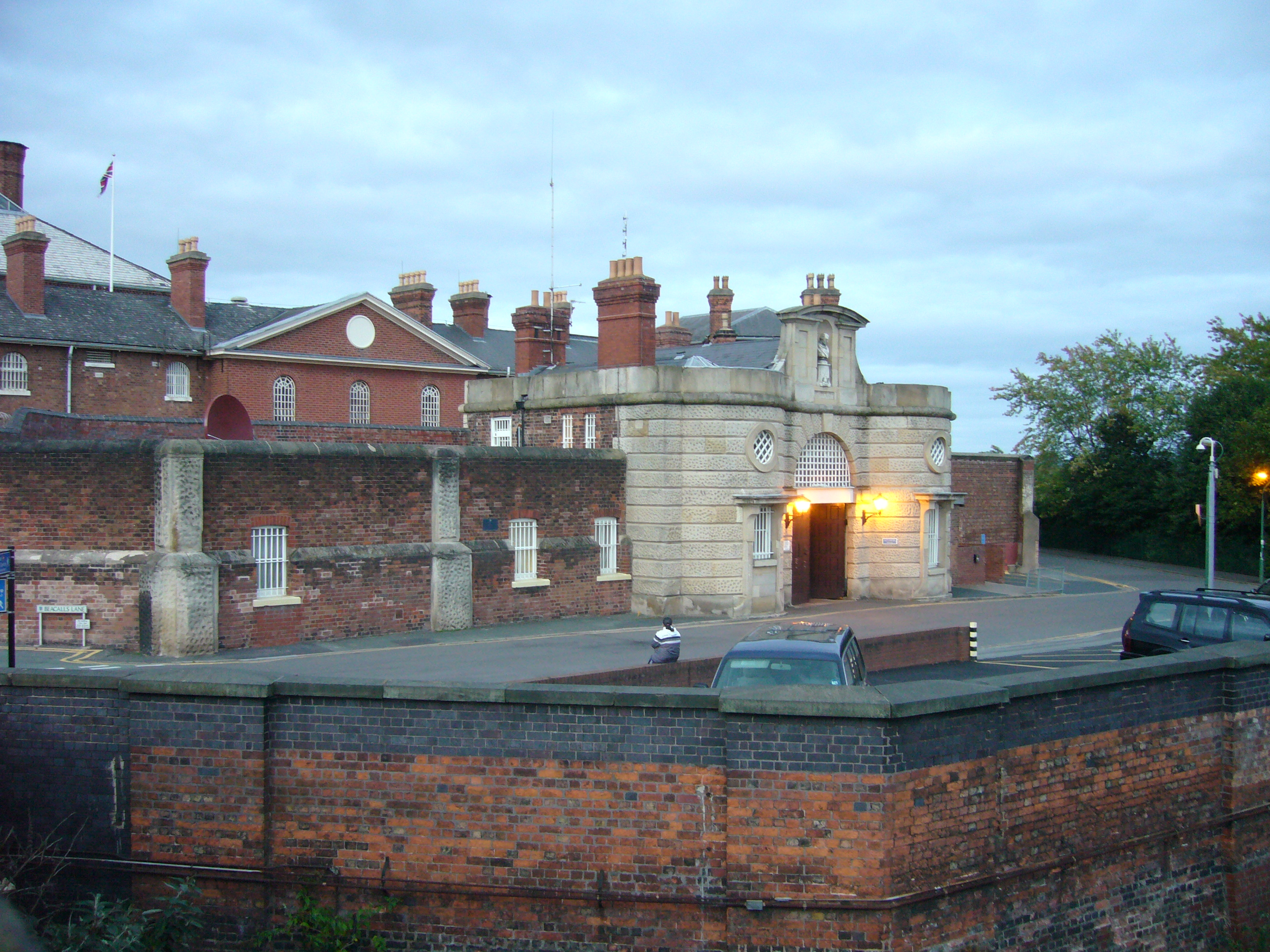
- Main entrance to Shrewsbury Prison
- Interactive map of Shrewsbury Prison
- Location: Shrewsbury, Shropshire
- Opened: 1877/1878
- Managed by: The Cove Group
- Website: https://www.shrewsburyprison.com

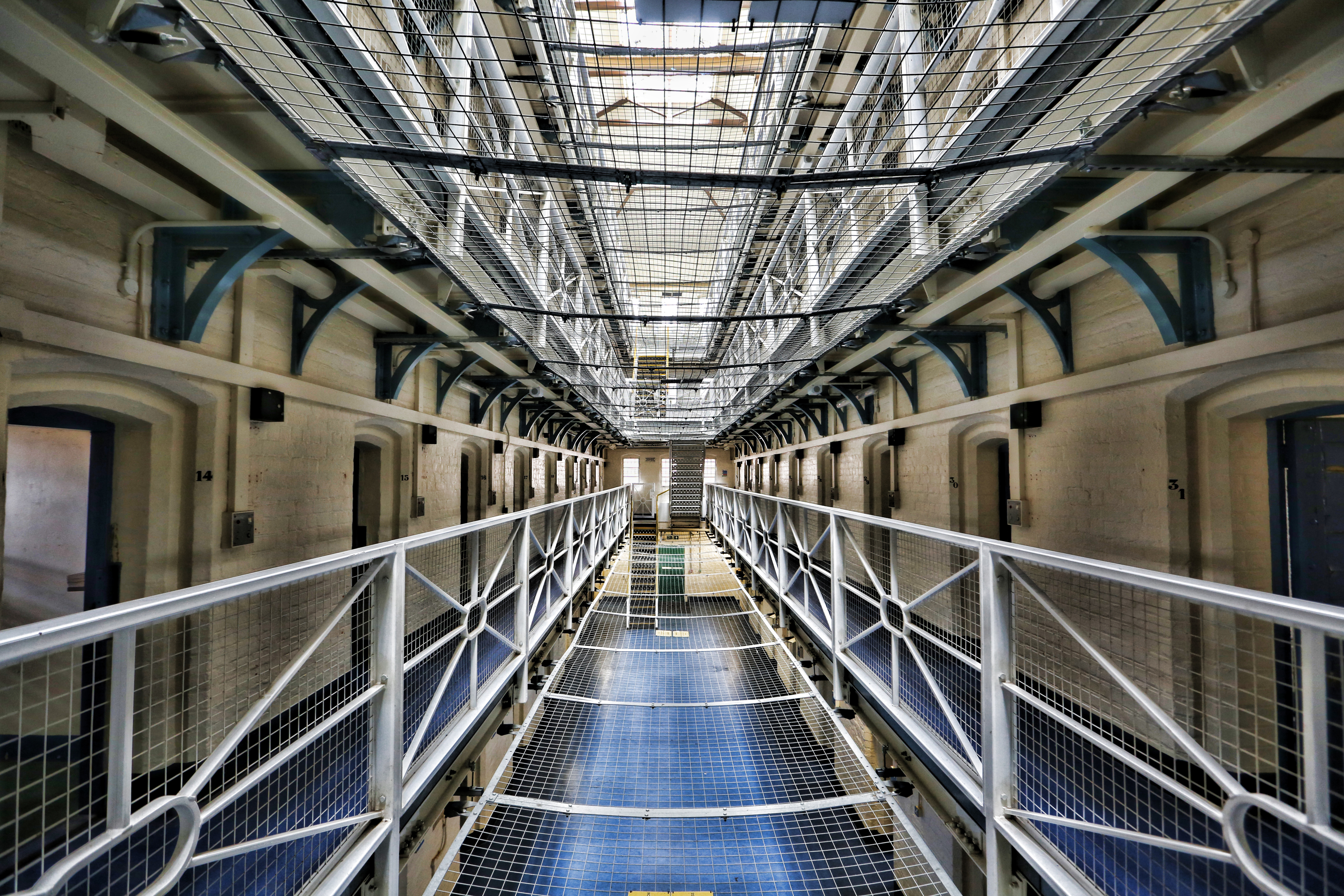
Inside A Wing at Shrewsbury Prison

HM Prison Shrewsbury was a category B/C men's prison in Shrewsbury, Shropshire, England. It was decommissioned in March 2013, and is now open to the public.

The Victorian prison as seen today sits on top of the original Georgian prison, the remains of which are still accessible underneath the current buildings. The former prison site, on Howard Street, adjacent to Shrewsbury railway station, is near the site of the Dana Gaol, a medieval prison. The name The Dana is still often used for the prison, as well as being the name of the road to one side of the prison and the pedestrian route that runs from near the front of the prison into the town centre via a footbridge over the station.

== History ==
There has been a prison on the site since 1793, the original building being constructed by Thomas Telford to plans by Shrewsbury architect John Hiram Haycock; the present prison building was constructed in 1877. The prison took female convicts until 1922.

For 20 years, Samuel Webster Allen was the Roman Catholic chaplain at the prison before being made the Bishop of Shrewsbury in 1897. Former Wales Rugby Union international player John Strand-Jones was the part-time Church of England chaplain from 1930 to 1934.

Between 1902 and 1961 the following seven people were executed by hanging within the walls of HMP Shrewsbury for the crime of murder:

- In a brick shed at the rear of the prison:
  - Richard Wigley, aged 34 years, on Tuesday, 18 March 1902, for the murder of his girlfriend Mary Ellen Bowen.
  - William Griffiths, aged 57 years, on Tuesday, 24 July 1923, for the murder of his mother Catherine Hughes.
- In an execution suite built into existing rooms at the front of the site:
  - Frank Griffin, aged 40 years, on Thursday, 4 January 1951, for the murder of Jane Edge.
  - Harry Huxley, aged 43 years, on Tuesday, 8 July 1952, for the murder of his girlfriend Ada Royce.
  - Donald Neil Simon, aged 32 years, on Thursday, 23 October 1952, for the murders of his estranged wife Eunice Simon and her lover Victor Brades.
  - Desmond Donald Hooper, aged 27 years, on Tuesday, 26 January 1954, for the murder of Betty Smith
  - George Riley aged 21 years on Thursday, 9 February 1961, for the murder of his neighbour Adeline Mary Smith.

The names of their victims and their relationships with them appear also. In almost every case the murder victim was female. Executions took place at 8.00 am. All executed prisoners were buried in unmarked graves inside the prison, as was customary. The four executions which took place during the 1950s were all conducted by Albert Pierrepoint and his assistant. The last execution in 1961 was conducted by Harry Allen and his assistant. In February 2014 the Ministry of Justice stated that the remains of ten executed prisoners were exhumed from the prison in 1972, with nine cremated at a local crematorium and the ashes scattered there. The remaining body was handed over to relatives.

In September 2004, Member of Parliament George Stevenson, MP for Stoke South (not the Shrewsbury constituency MP, who was then Paul Marsden) called for an enquiry into the number of suicides which had occurred at Shrewsbury Prison. This came after three inmates had hanged themselves at the jail in two weeks.

A report in 2005 named Shrewsbury prison as the most overcrowded in England and Wales. In August 2008 a further report stated that the prison had 178 places in use but held 326 inmates - an overcrowding rate of 183%. A report in June 2012 by the Prison Reform Trust awarded Shrewsbury second place in England and Wales for overcrowding, holding 326 prisoners in space designed for 170 men, a figure exceeded only by HM Prison Kennet in Liverpool at the time. In 1934, the prison had contained the larger number of 204 cells.

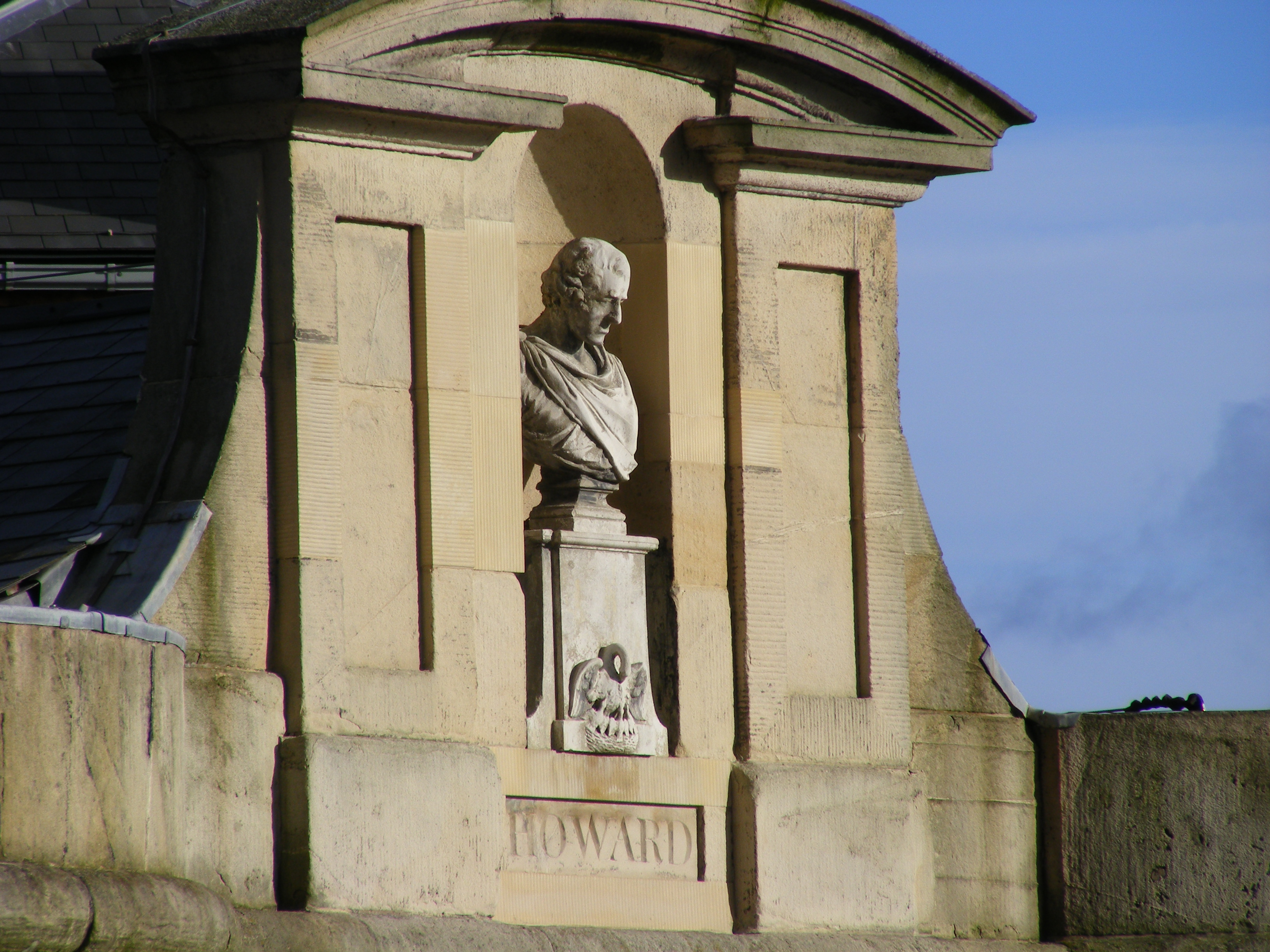
Bust of John Howard above the main entrance.

A bust of prison reformer John Howard is above the main entrance to the prison. The street leading up to the prison from the main road is named Howard Street after him.

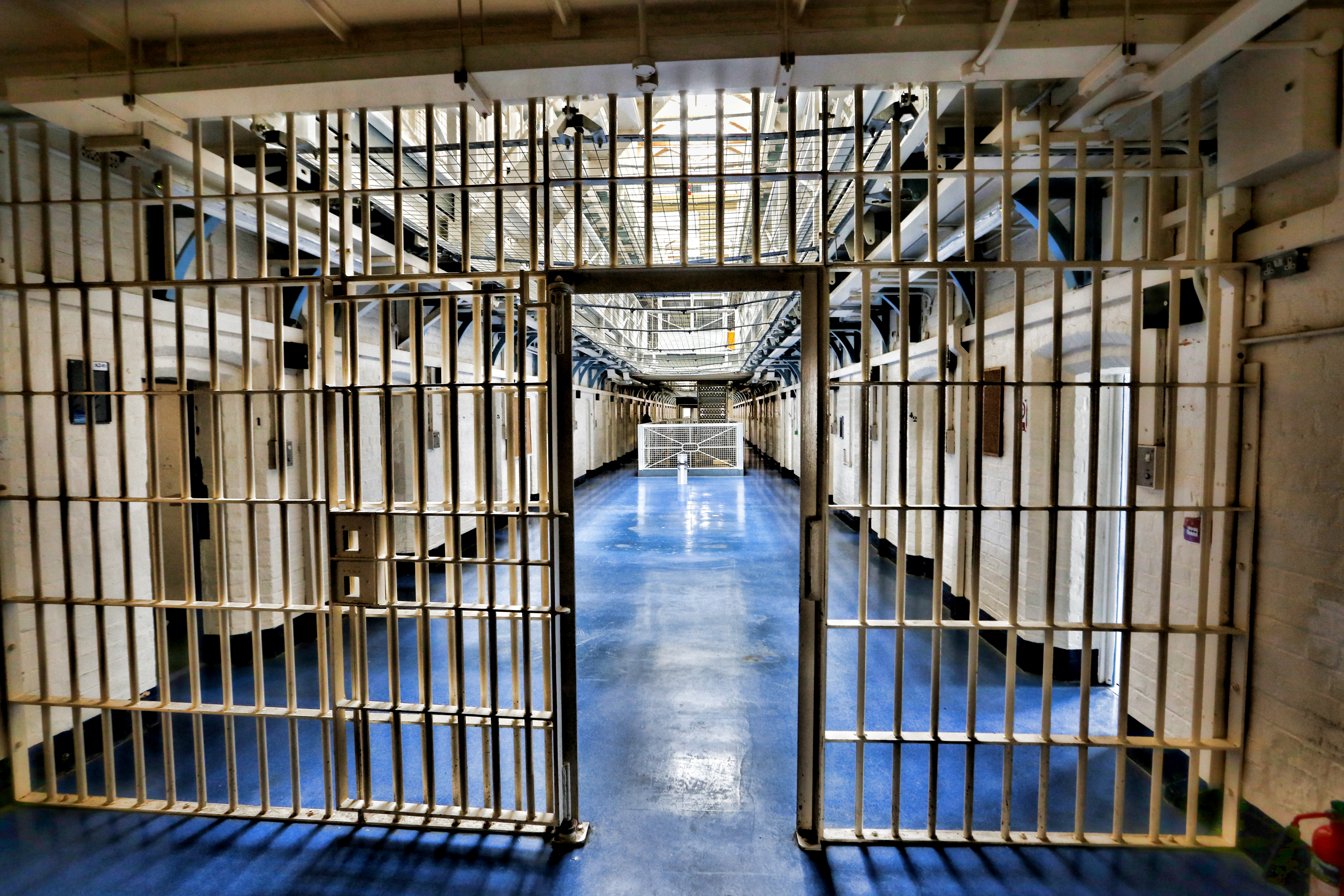
The View from Healthcare inside Shrewsbury Prison

Before closure, Shrewsbury was a Category B/C prison accepting adult males from the local courts in its catchment area. Accommodation at the prison consisted of double occupancy cells in mostly Victorian buildings. The prison offered education and workshops to inmates. A Listener Scheme was also available to prisoners at risk of suicide or self-harm.

In January 2013, it was announced that the prison was scheduled for closure. The last inmates were transferred from Shrewsbury to other prisons on 27 February 2013, ahead of its closure in March.

The Grade II listed former prison building was sold by the Ministry of Justice to developers, the Trevor Osborne Property Group, in 2014, and was expected to be converted into homes and offices. In April 2015, it was revealed proposals included accommodation for around 200 students of the recently created University Centre Shrewsbury. In January 2016 formal planning proposals to convert the former prison to flats and student accommodation were submitted but in December 2016 Shropshire Council refused the outline plans, also including restaurants, shops and a gym, on grounds of effects on traffic.

== Use as a tourist attraction under The Cove Group ==
In September 2020 Shrewsbury Prison was purchased by The Campbell Group (now the Cove Group), who operate the site as a tourist destination. The prison is now open to the public and the Cove Group who offer guided tours and ghost tours throughout the 4-acre site.

On 7 March 2022, the BBC reported that Joel Campbell CEO of the Campbell Group/Cove Group, tried to claim that an image of the prison’s gatehouse used on packaging by Shrewsbury shop – Planet Doughnut – was a trademark infringement. Although Planet Doughnut agreed to change their design, there was no legal basis for the infringement claim as the design had been in use several years before Joel Campbell registered it as a trademark.

On 28 November 2023 it was reported that the Cove Group planned to build a hotel within the grounds of the prison. According to the prison's website the new hotel would include 20 rooms, a conference centre, a restaurant for 120 covers and additional parking for 72 cars. Planned to open in 2026, the new hotel requires the demolition of an existing building within the prison grounds. The Cove Group describes the new boutique hotel as turning the site into a world-class tourist destination.

A previous planning application to convert the prison cells into student accommodation was turned down by Shropshire Council on the grounds of the detrimental effect that the additional traffic would have on the approach to the prison.

As of October 2026, the Shropshire Council Planning Portal has no listing for a new build hotel. Furthermore, whilst planning permission was previously granted to demolish an existing Education Block where the proposed new hotel will be built, no demolition work has started.

In June 2025, the Cove Group featured in a podcast by former BBC Radio Shropshire presenter Jim Hawkins relating to working practices at Shrewsbury Prison and Shepton Mallet Prison. Specifically the concerns related to working practices experienced by the Tour Guides at both sites and health and safety concerns.

Former Tour Guides spoke of a "toxic work culture" under the Cove Group which allegedly resulted in the resignations of five Tour Guides.

The interview included two former Tour Guides with written testimonies from nearly 20 former members of staff that corroborated their allegations. Cove Group's CEO Joel Campbell was also interviewed for his response to these allegations.

In February 2026, another prison run by Cove Attractions Ltd – HM Prison Peterhead, faced imminent closure according to a press release from Cove due to funding difficulties caused by delays in the due diligence process as part of Cove's attempt to buy Peterhead Prison. This led to speculation about the future of Shrewsbury Prison under The Cove Group.

Energy efficiency and proposed development

In March 2025, energy-efficiency organisation Severn Wye published a case study of work undertaken at Shrewsbury Prison through the Marches Energy Grant, an initiative funded through the UK Shared Prosperity Fund. The case study reported that the prison’s reliance on electric heaters was contributing to running costs of approximately £43,000 per year. Severn Wye stated that the site’s former warm-air gas heating system could be reconnected, but that its specialist considered the system oversized for the prison’s current requirements.

Severn Wye recommended measures including upgrading the roof insulation of the main building and installing air-source heat pumps. It estimated that the recommended measures could produce annual savings of approximately £31,000 and reduce carbon emissions by 65%. The case study also identified the proposed hotel development at the site as an opportunity to install solar photovoltaic panels. Severn Wye stated that the hotel could increase overall energy consumption but that its roof could accommodate an 80 kWp solar array, potentially generating approximately 73,000 kWh of electricity annually.

Cove Group subsequently described the Shrewsbury development as the next phase in the site’s development. Its property division states that the scheme involves the introduction of a new-build hotel and spa alongside the existing prison and attraction, with potential hospitality, wellness and food-and-beverage facilities. (Cove Group) Cove Hotels describes the proposed Shrewsbury hotel as offering premium accommodation, a dedicated spa and wellness facilities, and a rooftop restaurant and terrace overlooking the surrounding countryside, the River Severn and the historic prison.

== Cultural impact ==
=== Poetry ===
The prison is mentioned in the poem "On Moonlit Heath and Lonesome Bank", from A. E. Housman's A Shropshire Lad. The proximity of the prison to Shrewsbury railway station and junction is highlighted in the verse:

They hang us now in Shrewsbury jail:
The whistles blow forlorn,
And trains all night groan on the rail
To men that die at morn.

=== Film location ===
Since its closure in September 2015, it was reported the buildings would be used as a setting for the Sky 1 television drama, Lucky Man (producer, Carnival Films) being cast as the fictional "Whitecross Prison". Filming would take place there for a week.

Shrewsbury Prison was used as the filming location of the prison for series 2 of the ITV drama series Prey.

In 2019, the prison was used for episodes of Coronation Street featuring Jack P. Shepherd.

In 2020, the prison features in the final episode of ITV's Bancroft when DCI Elizabeth Bancroft is sent down at the end of the episode. The same year, the prison was also used for scenes in the TV drama Time, starring Sean Bean and Stephen Graham, and for scenes in the TV drama Without Sin starring Vicky McClure.

In 2023, the prison featured in the first episode of ITV's The Hunt for Raoul Moat a TV dramatisation of the 2010 Northumbria Police manhunt for Raoul Moat.

In 2023, the prison was used for the opening scenes in the 5th series of Celebrity Hunted and the Channel 4 reality show Banged Up.

== Notable prisoners ==
- John Mytton, the eccentric known as "Mad Jack Mytton", was a debtor prisoner in Shrewsbury before being transferred to the King's Bench Prison in London where he died in 1834.
- George Riley, executed by hanging at Shrewsbury prison in February 1961. He was the last person executed at the prison before this form of capital punishment was abolished in 1969.
- Robert Welch, one of the members of the Great Train Robbery gang, was incarcerated at the prison in 1964.
- Ricky Tomlinson, actor, spent two years in the prison for "conspiracy to intimidate" for his involvement with the national miners, steelworkers, car manufacturers and builder's strike in 1973.
- Lee Davies, corrections officer who worked at HMP Lancaster Farms. He smuggled mobile phones and drugs into that prison before being caught while on duty. He served a few months in prison at HMP Shrewsbury in 2012.
