= The Quantum Leap =

Public sculpture in Shrewsbury

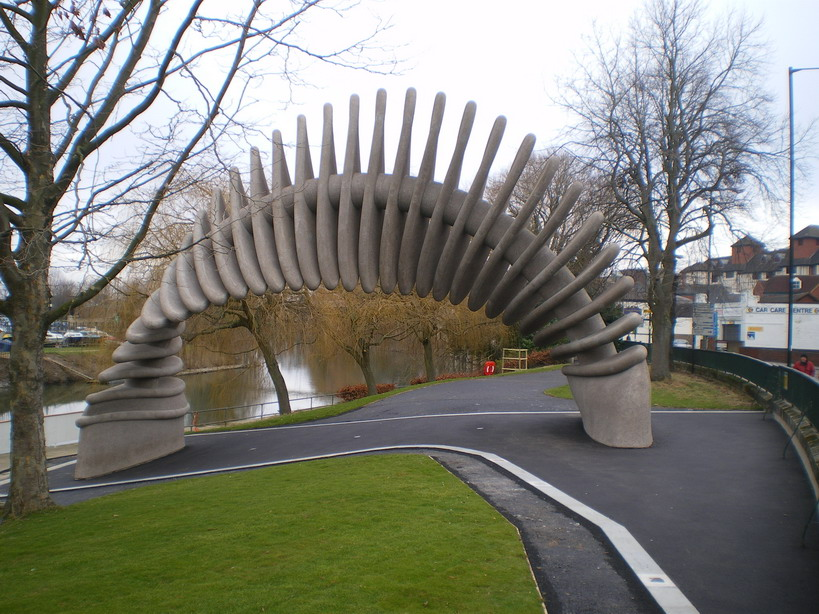
- The Quantum Leap
- Artists: Pearce & Lal
- Year: 2009
- Location: 52.709911°N 2.756868°W

The Quantum Leap is a sculpture situated on the bank of the River Severn in a park in Shrewsbury, Shropshire, England. It was created to celebrate the bicentenary of the birth of evolutionist Charles Darwin, who was born in the town in 1809. The sculpture was unveiled on 8 October 2009 by Randal Keynes, a great-great-grandson of Darwin.

== Details ==
The Quantum Leap is the main point of a 'Geo-Garden', converted from Mardol Quay Gardens on the town centre bank of the Severn. In addition to Darwin himself, it celebrates Shropshire's geological diversity due to the county containing 10 of the 12 geological periods. Darwin interested himself in geology during his Shropshire childhood.

The sculpture consists of 59 segments measuring 12 metres (40 feet) in height, 17.5 metres (57 feet) in length, and weighs more than 113 tonnes, excluding foundations and piles. The work is abstract, and due to its Darwinian theme is commonly interpreted as representing dinosaur bones, DNA, or a backbone. In local media, often in a negative sense, it has been nicknamed 'The Slinky' due to its perceived similarity to the coiled-wire toy.

It was designed by Sutton Coldfield-based architectural firm Pearce & Lal, who revealed their design in July 2008. Architect Ranbir Lal, of Pearce & Lal, stated "It is a privilege to work on a memorial to Charles Darwin. We hope that the sculpture we have designed in his memory expresses the vitality and range of his ideas, and brings them alive to the people of modern-day Shrewsbury."

Each of the blades of the sculpture were made by Histon Concrete Products, based in Ely, Cambridgeshire.

== Costs ==
Funding to the sculpture from taxes was initially taken from the inhabitants of the Shrewsbury & Atcham Borough Council, but structural changes in English local government put into effect on 1 April 2009 abolished the borough and created the larger Shropshire Council area.

The sculpture's final total cost was revealed as £450,000 at the time of the sculpture's unveiling. The original cost to the taxpayer was expected to be around £200,000 but in May 2009 a change in the supporting structure was required when the contractors found themselves unable to get the frame on site because of a tree root protection area. Additional work was required in August 2009, when it was found that one of the sculpture's pieces was reportedly out by around 18 inches. The public cost eventually rose to around £308,000 by September 2009.

In November 2012 it was revealed that the final cost of the sculpture exceeded £1 million, and that the council had rejected the opportunity to pay just £600,000 to contractors Alun Griffiths, on the advice of construction solicitors Hill International. Hill International had expected a final cost of around £200,000. Alun Griffiths were paid £860,000 for their contracting, with Hill International making £100,000.

Councillor Steve Charmley (Conservative), the council's cabinet member who inherited responsibility for the sculpture, stated "There won't be another Quantum Leap. In the financial climate we are in, there is no way we are going to be building a concrete structure on the river bank in the future". George Candler, the council's area director, revealed that all of the Shrewsbury & Atcham Borough Council staff who were responsible for the sculpture had left their posts on the borough's abolition or soon after.

Jon Tandy, a Labour councillor, stated his disapproval that the sculpture had cost more than the much larger and renowned £800,000 Angel of the North near Newcastle-upon-Tyne, stating "It is unbelievable. Even the Angel of the North cost less. It [The Quantum Leap] should never have been built. I realised, and 99% of the general population realised, that we were wasting money".

== See also ==
- Commemoration of Charles Darwin
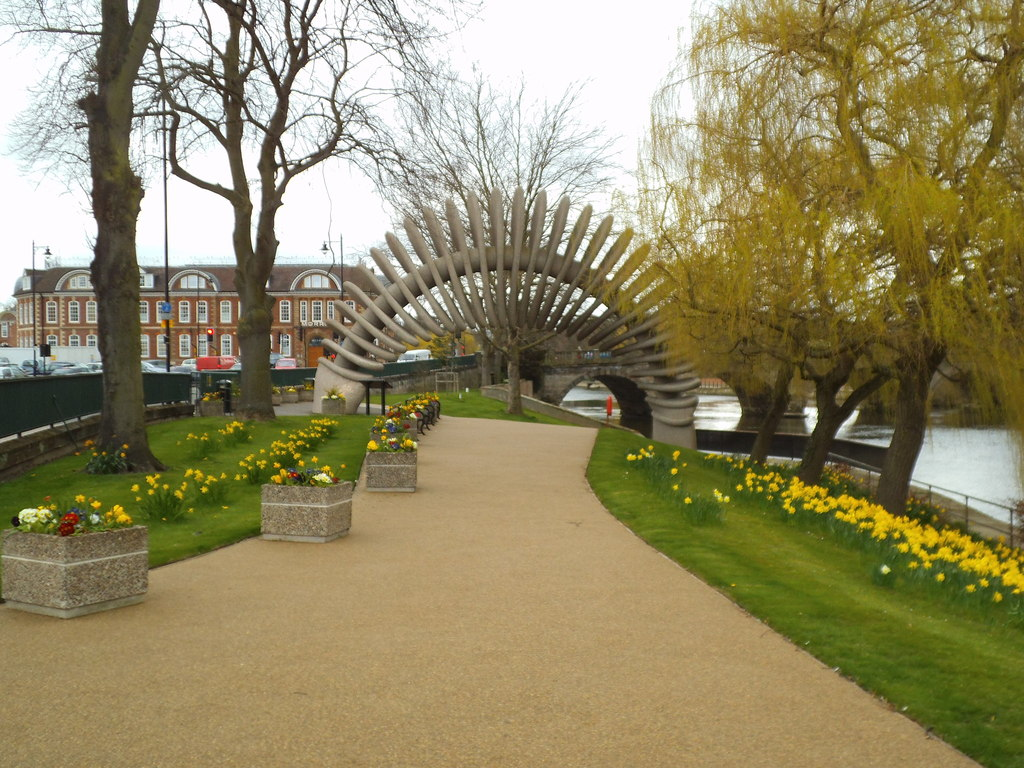

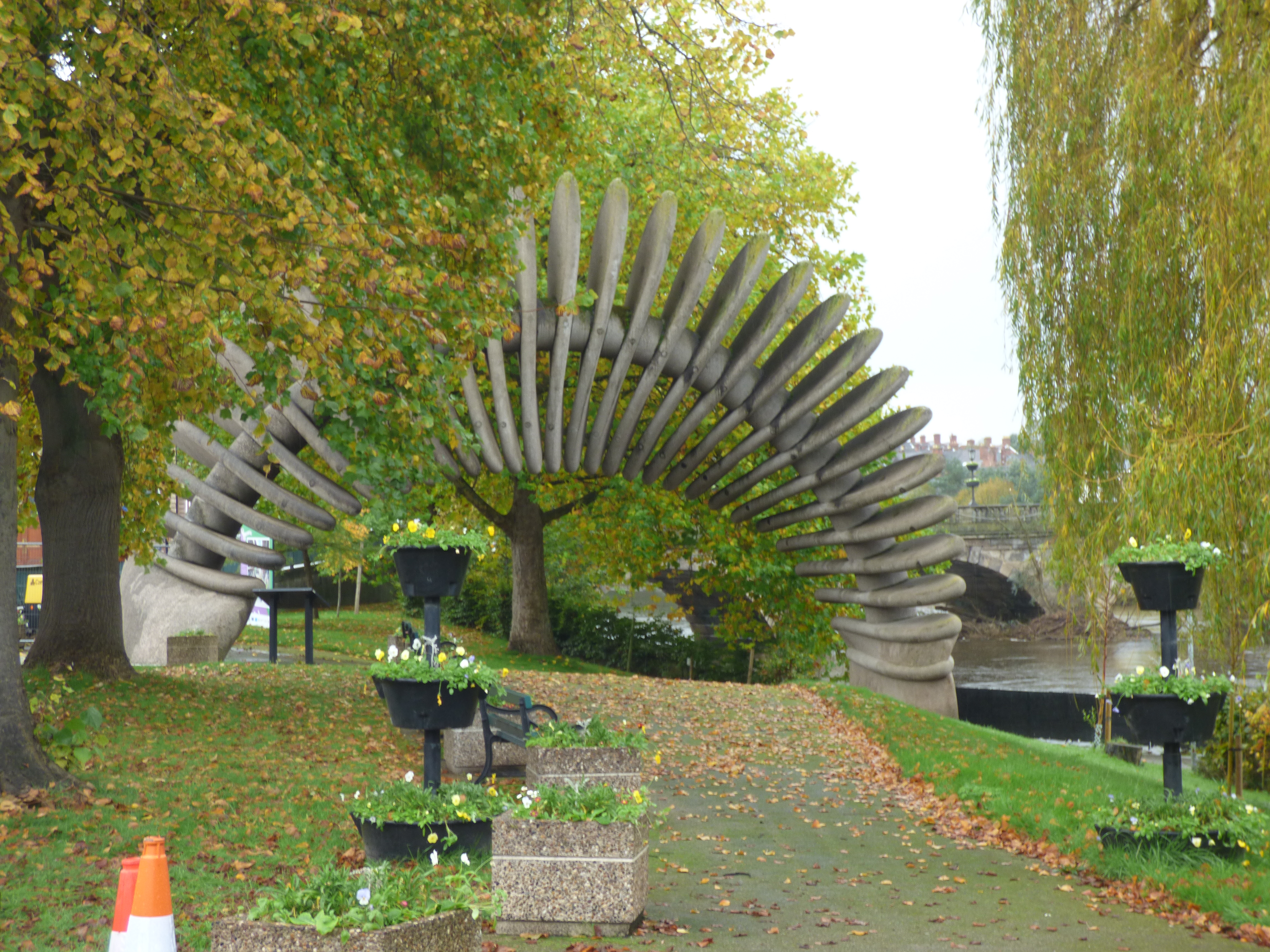

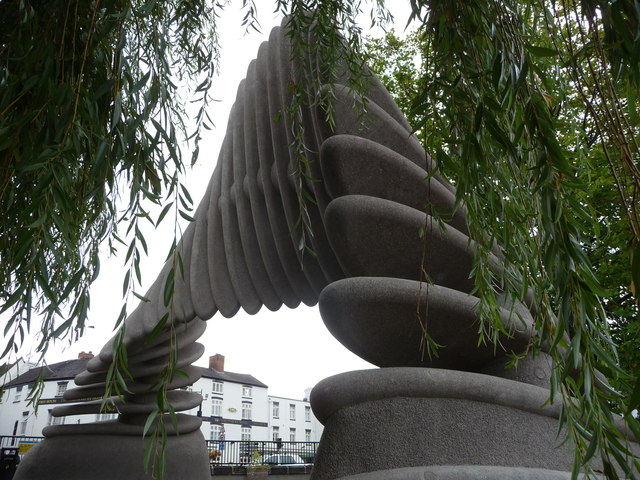

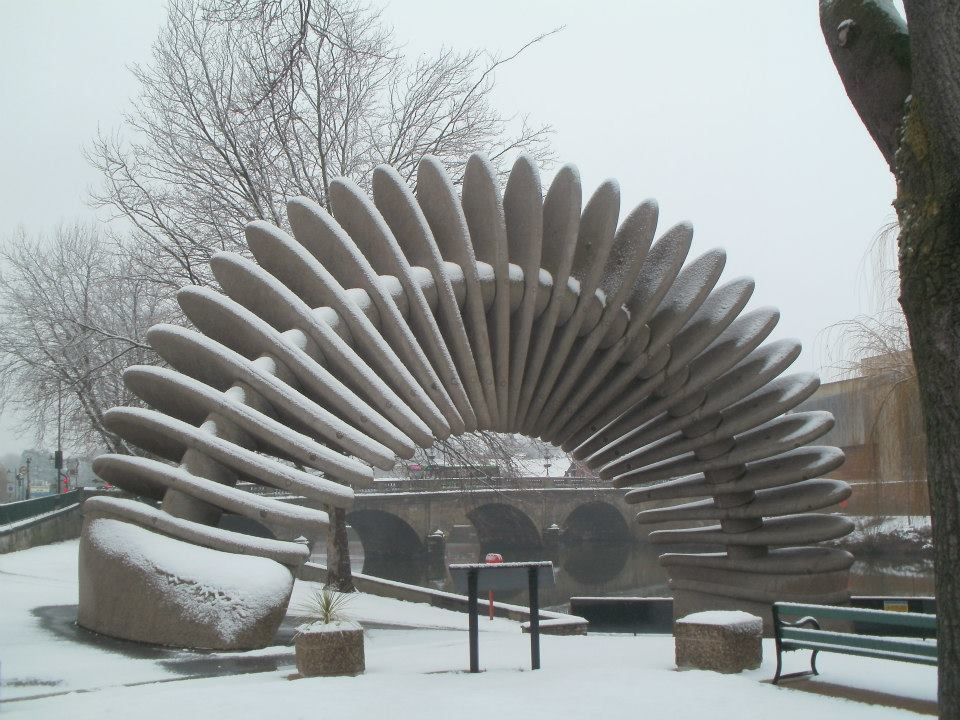
