= Frankwell =

District of Shrewsbury, Shropshire, England

Coordinates: 52.7112°N 2.7592°W

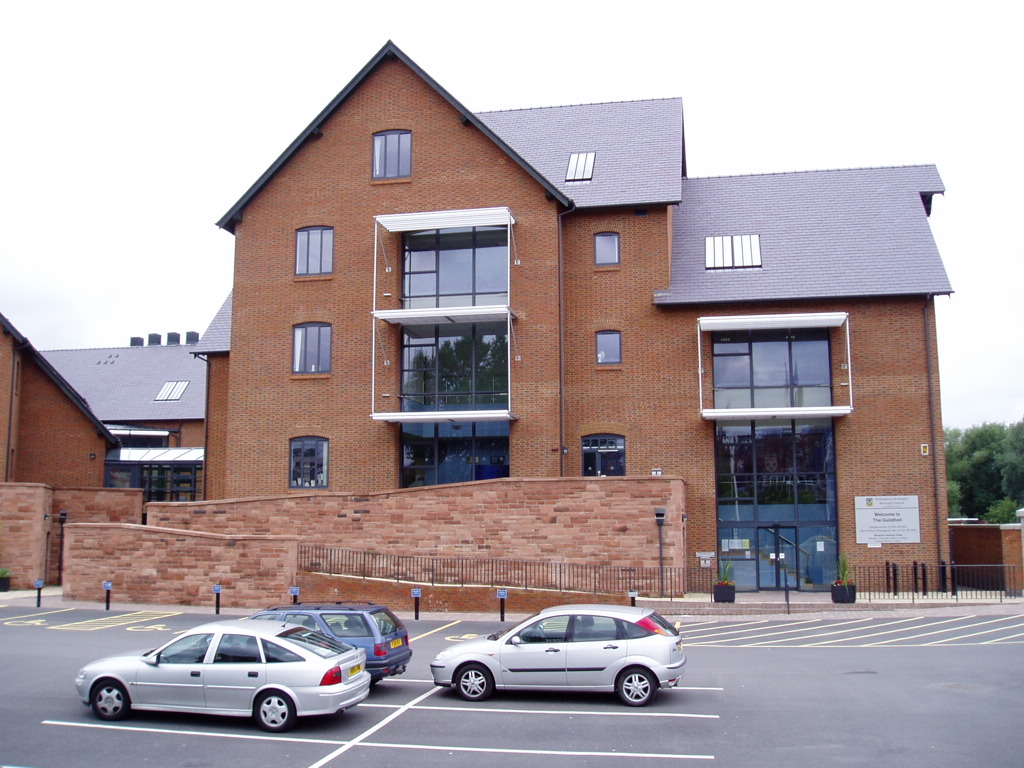
- The Guildhall, Frankwell

- Location within Shropshire
- OS grid reference: SJ488128
- Unitary authority: Shropshire
- Ceremonial county: Shropshire
- Region: West Midlands
- Country: England
- Sovereign state: United Kingdom
- Post town: Shrewsbury
- Postcode district: SY3
- Dialling code: 01743
- Police: West Mercia
- Fire: Shropshire
- Ambulance: West Midlands
- UK Parliament: Shrewsbury

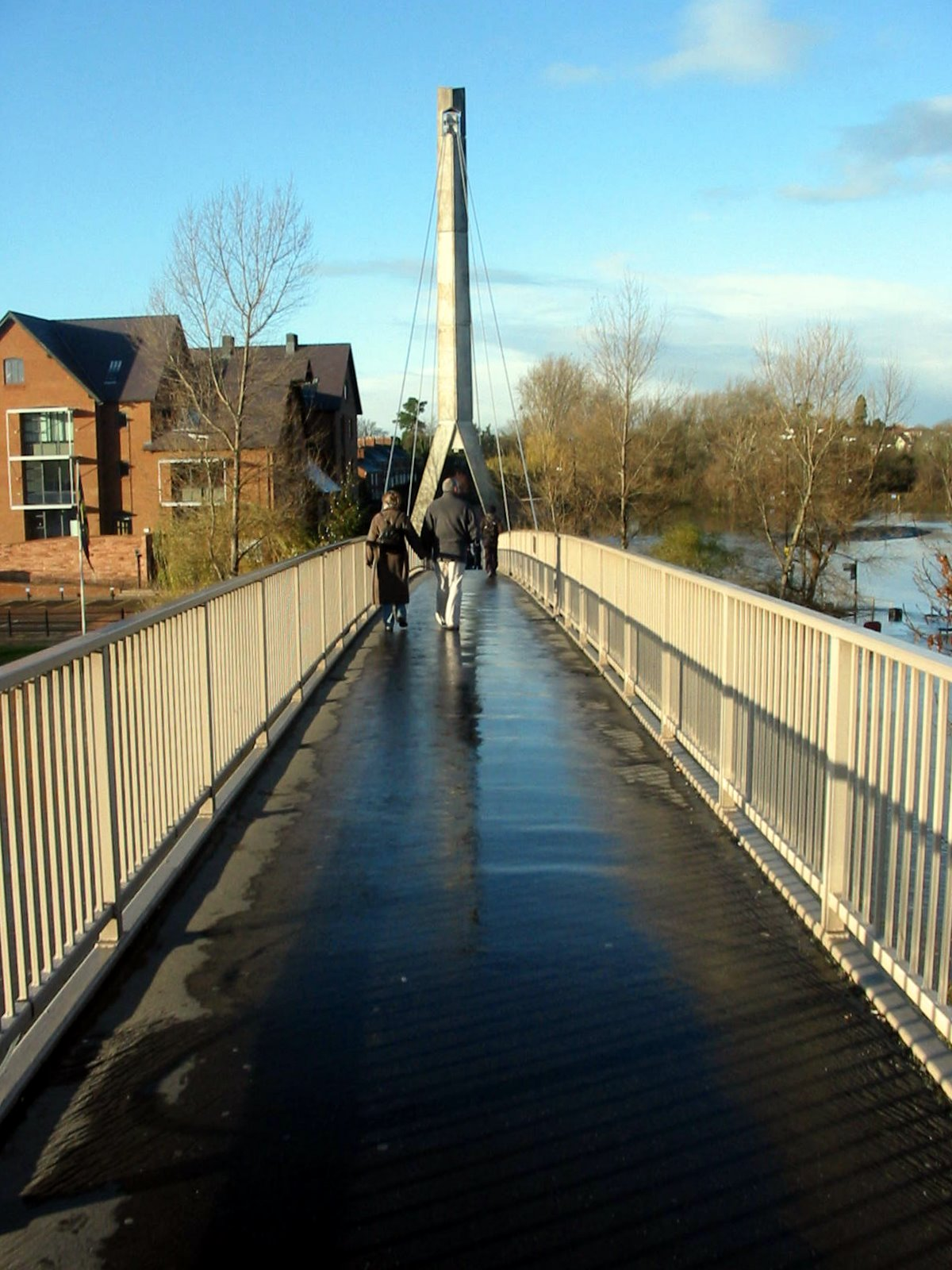
From Frankwell Footbridge, looking towards Frankwell with the Guildhall on the left.

Frankwell is a district of the town of Shrewsbury, in Shropshire, England. It lies adjacent to the River Severn, to the northwest of the town centre, and is one of Shrewsbury's oldest suburbs. The main road running through the area is also called Frankwell.

Frankwell grew up as a port and trading location by the river and on the road to Wales, but across the river from the walled borough of Shrewsbury and therefore beyond the town's jurisdiction. There have been a number of suggestions about where the name derives from, but one possible origin is "Frankville", which means a town of free trade. Being independent from the larger borough of Shrewsbury gave it a local nickname of the Little Borough, a name which is used to this day.

Today Frankwell continues to be a commercial area of the town, lying just outside the town centre, with its own character and identity. There has been much redevelopment recently near to the river, especially now flood defences have been constructed, and new buildings include The Guildhall (originally built for Shrewsbury and Atcham Borough Council) and Theatre Severn.

== Early origins ==
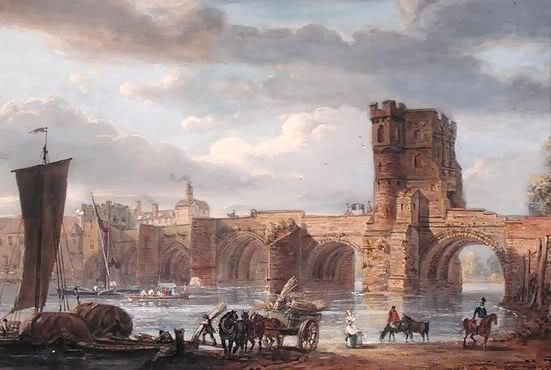
St George's Bridge, the old Welsh Bridge, linking Mardol with Frankwell, circa 1500

Frankwell's origins are connected with the crossing of the River Severn from the meander core which forms the centre of Shrewsbury. Water Lane, which still exists today, led to a ford over the river that was probably a crossing point in the early Middle Ages. St George's Bridge, a fortified and partly inhabited structure, was built in the mid twelfth century. This bridge, which also became known as Welsh(man's) Bridge in the thirteenth century, crossed the river from the end of Mardol on the town side to a position close to a former Methodist chapel on the Frankwell side. Although this bridge was demolished in the 1790s, remnants of the foundations and land arches remain.

A number of buildings in Frankwell show evidence of Frankwell's medieval development. 92 Frankwell is the surviving half of a two-bay cruck-framed hall house, and 111-12 Frankwell is a pair of early fifteenth century semi-detached houses. Boundaries in the oldest part of Frankwell have been strongly influenced by medieval burgage plots approached from the main street through passages.

== Early modern period ==
Frankwell was highly prosperous in the sixteenth to eighteenth centuries. 4-7 Frankwell is an imposing building with ground-floor shops and first- and second- floor workshops above, built in about 1590. 113-14 Frankwell, built around 1620, remains a splendid and imposing half-timbered building. Late seventeenth and early eighteenth century buildings, including the 'Anchor' public house, line the corner to the approach to the old Welsh Bridge.

The old Welsh Bridge (St George's Bridge) was replaced by the present day Welsh Bridge in the 1793-95. The new Welsh Bridge is located some 70 m (77 yd) further downstream from the old bridge.

== Frankwell today ==
Frankwell holds the County Ground of Shropshire County Cricket Club, which was played on as early as 1862.

Frankwell Forge was a small industrial area by the side of the Welsh Bridge, founded in 1878 and closed only recently, in 2004. It closed to make way for the new theatre complex planned for the area. The name of the company which operated the site when it closed was "H and E Davies".

Also in Frankwell is St George's Church and Frankwell Quay (with its small marina/boat yard and the town's only major permanent flood defences). Two bridges connect the district with the town centre: the historic Welsh Bridge and the modern Frankwell Footbridge. Flooding, which affected the district regularly and badly, no longer occurs due to flood defences built in 2002/03. Only the main car park and some houses on New Street are affected by flooding today.

A new headquarters for Shrewsbury and Atcham Borough Council was opened on Frankwell Quay in March 2004. After Shrewsbury and Atcham Borough Council was abolished in 2009, it became surplus to requirements and was converted for use as an academic facility for the University Centre Shrewsbury. In 2024 Shropshire Council announced its intention to vacate Shirehall, and the university closed its Shrewsbury campus, vacating the Guildhall. Shropshire Council relocated to the Guildhall in 2025.

Frankwell gained notoriety for the 2006 'Brothel Slayings' in which 2 women were brutally murdered with a blunt instrument. The brothel, now closed, was situated next to the Wheatsheaf pub and is now a tattoo studio.

== See also ==
- Mountfields, Shrewsbury - a distinct area of Frankwell
