= Mardol (street) =

Street in Shrewsbury, Shropshire, England, UK

Coordinates: 52°42′32″N 2°45′21″W

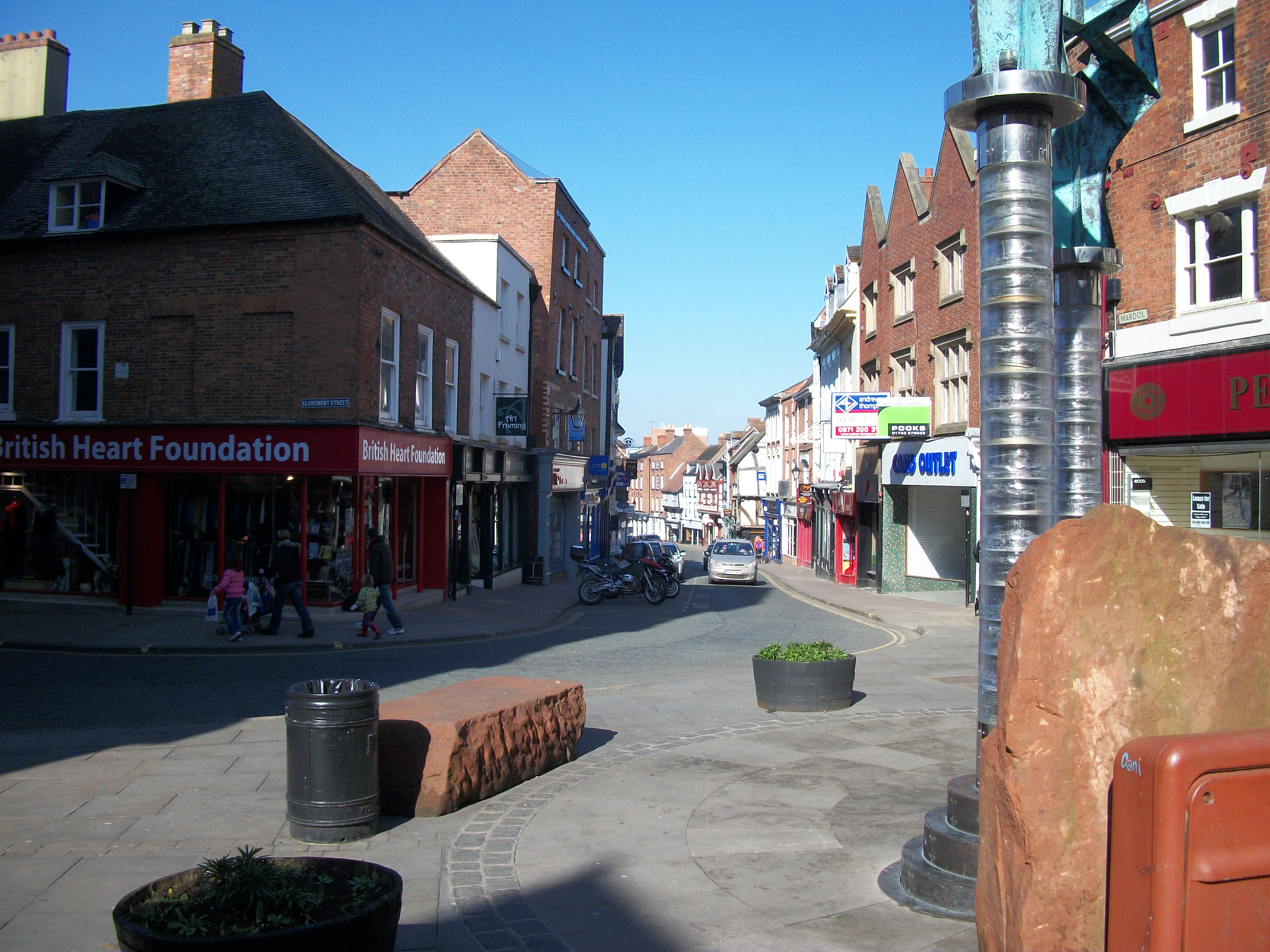
Looking down Mardol from the Darwin Gate artwork

Mardol is an historic street in Shrewsbury, Shropshire with a variety of architectural styles, ranging from Tudor timber-framed buildings to more modern constructs. It runs from the site of the St George's Bridge (a crossing of the Severn, replaced by the nearby Welsh Bridge, at a place called Mardol Quay) up to the town centre, a place called Mardol Head.

The origin of the name of the street is not clear. One possibility is "the mard wall" meaning boundary wall, another is "the Devil's End".

Shuts and passages leading from the street include the King's Head Passage, Phoenix Place, Mardol Gardens, Carnarvon Lane, Hill's Lane and Roushill Bank. At the top of Mardol stands a public artwork, Darwin Gate, created in 2004, whilst at the foot is The Quantum Leap, another large outdoor artwork created in 2009.

== See also ==
- History of Shrewsbury
