= Coleham Island =

Former river island in England

Coleham Island was an island on the River Severn just to the south of Shrewsbury, Shropshire.

In the Middle Ages Coleham Island linked two separate bridges, the Stone Bridge linking the Island with Wyle Cop in Shrewsbury, and Monks Bridge (also known as Abbey Bridge) that linked the island with the other bank of the river. The combined length of the two bridges with the island was close to 1000 feet. The Shropshire Historic Environment Record suggests that ‘the bridge(s) were almost certainly in place by, but perhaps not long before, 1121, when two charters of Henry I to the abbey refer to the two bridges at Shrewsbury’.

The island was excavated between 1769 and c.1772, at the same time as the twin bridges were demolished, and after this it ceased to exist. During the latter part of this work the material from the island was used to infill the arches of Abbey Bridge.

Shrewsbury's English Bridge now sits on the site of the old Stone Bridge.
