= Shrewsbury and Atcham =

Former non-metropolitan district in England

Coordinates: 52.628°N 2.759°W

Borough of Shrewsbury and Atcham
- Shown within Shropshire
- History
  - Origin: Borough of Shrewsbury; Atcham Rural District
  - Created: 1 April 1974
  - Abolished: 31 March 2009
  - Succeeded by: Shropshire
- Status: District, Borough
- ONS code: 39UE
- Government: Shrewsbury and Atcham Borough Council
  - HQ: Shrewsbury
  - Motto: Floreat Salopia

Shrewsbury and Atcham was a local government district with borough status in Shropshire, England, between 1974 and 2009.

Shrewsbury was the only town in the borough; Atcham, although itself only a village, was included in the name as a reflection of the incorporation into the borough of the former Atcham Rural District. Other notable villages included Alberbury, Bayston Hill, Bomere Heath, Condover, Cressage, Cross Houses, Dorrington, Ford, Hanwood, Minsterley, Montford Bridge, Nesscliffe, Pontesbury, Uffington and Westbury.

The Borough of Shrewsbury and Atcham covered 602 square kilometres (232 sq mi), which was 19% of the non-metropolitan county of Shropshire. To the north of the borough was the North Shropshire district and the Borough of Oswestry and to the south were the South Shropshire and Bridgnorth districts. The borough lay in the centre of Shropshire and on the border with Wales. A 2006 estimate put the population of the borough at 95,900 (this accounted for approx 40% of the total population for the non-metropolitan county).

The district and its council was abolished on 1 April 2009 when the new Shropshire unitary authority was established, as part of the 2009 structural changes to local government in England.

== History ==
The borough was formed on 1 April 1974, under the Local Government Act 1972 covering the area of the two former districts of the municipal borough of Shrewsbury and the Atcham Rural District, to form a new non-metropolitan district. The new district was initially called "Shrewsbury", but was renamed Shrewsbury and Atcham on 12 June 1974 by the new council. The district was awarded borough status from its creation, allowing the chairman of the council to take the title of mayor.

The borough unsuccessfully applied for city status in the 2000 and 2002 competitions.

The borough and its council were abolished as part of the 2009 structural changes to local government in England. The council's functions were taken over from 1 April 2009 by Shropshire County Council, which was renamed Shropshire Council at the same time.

== Parishes ==
The rural part of the borough (the pre-1974 Atcham Rural District) was always parished but the urban part of the borough (the pre-1974 municipal borough of Shrewsbury) was an unparished area. A town council for Shrewsbury was established on 1 April 2009, being the same day that the new Shropshire unitary authority took over from the old Shrewsbury and Atcham Borough Council.

Map of civil parishes in Shrewsbury and Atcham

The borough contained the following parishes:

- Acton Burnell, Alderbury with Cardeston, All Stretton, Astley, Atcham
- Bayston Hill, Berrington, Bicton, Buildwas
- Cardington, Church Preen, Church Pulverbatch, Condover, Cound, Cressage
- Ford, Frodesley
- Great Hanwood, Great Ness
- Harley, Hughley
- Kenley
- Leebotwood, Leighton and Easton Constantine, Little Ness, Longden, Longnor
- Minsterley, Montford
- Pimhill, Pitchford, Pontesbury
- Ruckley and Langley
- Sheinton, Smethcott
- Uffington, Upton Magna
- Westbury, Withington, Woolstaston, Wroxeter and Uppington

== Population ==
Year	1801	1811	1821	1831	1841	1851	1861	1871	1881	1891	1901	1911	1921	1931	1941	1951	1961	1971	1981	1991	2001	2011
Population	31,280	34,158	38,263	40,480	41,858	43,818	46,261	48,704	51,146	50,678	52,181	53,729	55,481	57,290	62,398	67,965	74,831	82,392	85,136	92,347	95,896	102,383
Population figures for Shrewsbury & Atcham borough. Source: A Vision of Britain through Time

== Headquarters ==
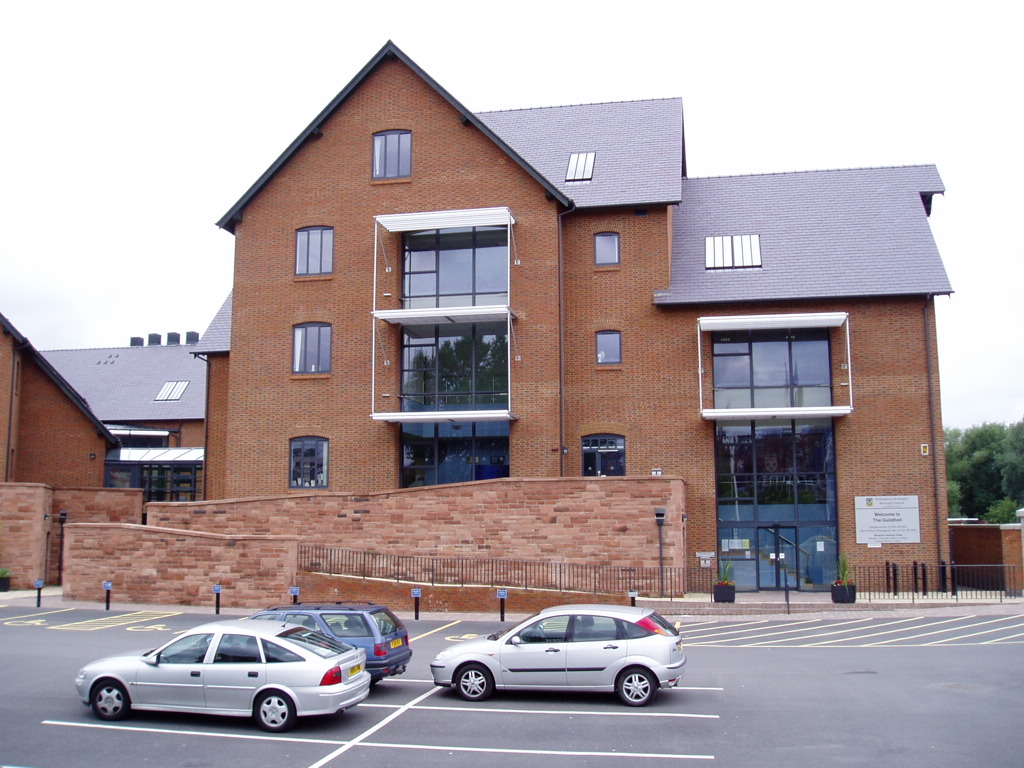
The former Guildhall of Shrewsbury and Atcham, Frankwell Quay

In the 19th century the headquarters of the borough council were at the Old Guildhall in the Market Square in Shrewsbury. The council moved to Newport House in Dogpole in 1917 and then to a modern building on Frankwell Quay in Frankwell in March 2004.

After Shrewsbury and Atcham Borough Council was abolished in 2009, it became surplus to requirements and in 2015 it was converted for use by the University Centre Shrewsbury. However, in 2024 Shropshire Council announced its intention to vacate Shirehall, and the university closed its Shrewsbury campus, vacating the Guildhall. Shropshire Council relocated to the Guildhall in 2024/25.

== Property ==
The borough council owned much land and property in the Shrewsbury and Atcham area. Shrewsbury Castle was owned by the borough council, as was the town museum and art gallery, which is located in the 'Rowley's House' building. The council also owned various car parks, offices, some public conveniences, large areas of parkland and a number of the town's bridges. Ownersrship of two main entertainment venues was also held by the council: The Music Hall, which holds the town theatre, its tourist information centre and a cafe, and The Old Market Hall, which was recently renovated to house a small cinema and cafe. The Bear Steps buildings were also owned by the council, although they are occupied by the town's civic society. The council once owned the Clive House Museum, but this was sold off and is now no longer a museum.

The borough council's housing stock was sold off in 2001 to a private social housing company, Severnside. The council earned some £60 million from this sale and this money has been used in part to buy and build their new Guildhall, build the new sports facilities at Sundorne and other large projects around the town, which were either under way or proposed when the borough council ceased to exist.

== Mayors ==
There has been a continuous succession of Mayors of Shrewsbury since 1638. In 1974, after the local government re-organisation, the style changed to "Mayor of Shrewsbury and Atcham Borough", and any Shrewsbury and Atcham borough councillor could be appointed to the post; they did not have to represent Shrewsbury itself. The last mayor of Shrewsbury and Atcham was Anne Chebsey. Since the abolition of the borough of Shrewsbury and Atcham in 2009, the mayor of Shrewsbury has been the chairman of the new Shrewsbury Town Council, a parish-level authority.

== Borough council ==
=== Political control ===
The first elections to the enlarged council were held in 1973, initially operating as a shadow authority until the new arrangements came into effect on 1 April 1974. Political control of the council from 1974 until its abolition in 2009 was as follows:

Party in control	Years
No overall control	1974–1976
Conservative	1976–1980
No overall control	1980–2002
Conservative	2002–2005
No overall control	2005–2006
Conservative	2006–2009

==== Leadership ====
The last leader of the council was Peter Nutting, a Conservative.

Councillor	Party	From	To
Peter Nutting	Conservative	2000	31 Mar 2009

=== Council elections ===
Elections were generally held three years out of every four, with a third of the council elected each time.

- 1973
- 1976 (New ward boundaries)
- 1978
- 1978
- 1980
- 1982
- 1983
- 1984
- 1986 (Borough boundary changes took place but the number of seats remained the same)
- 1987 (Borough boundary changes took place but the number of seats remained the same)
- 1988 (Borough boundary changes took place but the number of seats remained the same)
- 1990
- 1991
- 1992
- 1994
- 1995
- 1996
- 1998
- 1999
- 2000
- 2002 (New ward boundaries)
- 2003
- 2004
- 2006
- 2007

Results maps

2002 results map

2003 results map

2004 results map

2006 results map

2007 results map

==== By-election results ====
Copthorne By-Election 26 September 1996
Party	Candidate	Votes	%	±%
Conservative		947	46.3	
Liberal Democrats		614	30.0	
Labour		483	23.6	
Majority		333	16.3	
Turnout		2,044		
Conservative hold		Swing		

Haughmond By-Election 29 May 1997
Party	Candidate	Votes	%	±%
Conservative		330	47.3	+3.2
Liberal Democrats		192	27.5	+7.7
Labour		175	25.1	−11.1
Majority		138	19.8	
Turnout		697		
Conservative hold		Swing		

Pimhill By-Election 26 February 1998
Party	Candidate	Votes	%	±%
Liberal Democrats		427	61.8	+61.8
Conservative		215	31.1	−0.2
Labour		49	7.1	−21.8
Majority		212	30.7	
Turnout		691	49.0	
Liberal Democrats gain from Independent		Swing		

Attingham By-Election 25 March 1999
Party	Candidate	Votes	%	±%
Independent		255	78.9	+5.5
Labour		52	16.1	+16.1
Liberal Democrats		16	5.0	−6.4
Majority		203	62.8	
Turnout		323	28.3	
Independent hold		Swing		

Sundorne By-Election 30 March 2000
Party	Candidate	Votes	%	±%
Labour	Joyce Allaway	669	66.3	−11.0
Liberal Democrats	Philip Niblock	177	17.5	+17.5
Conservative	Stanley Felton	163	16.2	−6.6
Majority		492	48.8	
Turnout		1,009	26.4	
Labour hold		Swing		

Belle Vue By-Election 20 July 2000
Party	Candidate	Votes	%	±%
Labour	Alan Townsend	886	61.0	
Conservative	Gerald Lloyd	439	30.2	
Liberal Democrats	Neil White	128	8.8	
Majority		447	30.8	
Turnout		1,453	33.7	
Labour hold		Swing		

Meole Brace By-Election 26 October 2000
Party	Candidate	Votes	%	±%
Labour	William Morris	821	47.0	+8.3
Conservative	Eileen Membury	775	44.4	+0.5
Liberal Democrats	Janine Clarke	151	8.6	−8.8
Majority		46	2.6	
Turnout		1,747	30.3	
Labour hold		Swing		

Bagley By-Election 19 July 2001 (2)
Party	Candidate	Votes	%	±%
Liberal Democrats	Tamir Hazan	575		
Liberal Democrats	John Thurston	572		
Labour	Julie Humphreys	392		
Labour	Louis Gladden	384		
Conservative	Andrew Fox	198		
Conservative	Eileen Membury	198		
Turnout		2,319	27.6	
Liberal Democrats hold		Swing		

Column By-Election 8 July 2004
Party	Candidate	Votes	%	±%
Conservative	Jacqueline Brennand	902	69.2	+17.2
Labour	Louis Gladden	276	21.2	−7.2
Liberal Democrats	Janine Clarke	92	7.1	−8.2
Green	John Snell	32	2.5	−1.9
Majority		626	58.0	
Turnout		1,302	36.1	
Conservative hold		Swing		

Sutton & Reabrook By-Election 31 March 2005
Party	Candidate	Votes	%	±%
Labour	Elizabeth Parsons	671	46.0	−1.9
Conservative	Graham Watson	479	32.9	−3.8
Liberal Democrats	Caroline Cheyne	255	17.5	+9.8
BNP	Helen Foulkes	28	1.9	−2.8
Green	Tobias Green	25	1.7	−1.4
Majority		192	13.1	
Turnout		1,458	44.5	
Labour gain from Conservative		Swing		

Monkmoor By-Election 20 October 2005
Party	Candidate	Votes	%	±%
Liberal Democrats	John Durnell	603	49.3	+24.7
Labour	Louis Gladden	482	39.4	−12.7
Conservative	Paul Felton	139	11.3	−7.6
Majority		121	9.9	
Turnout		1,224	30.6	
Liberal Democrats gain from Labour		Swing		

Lawley By-Election 19 October 2006
Party	Candidate	Votes	%	±%
Independent	Timothy Barker	318	45.6	
Conservative	Reginald Barkley	298	42.7	
Liberal Democrats	Patricia Aidley	82	11.7	
Majority		20	2.9	
Turnout		698	43.4	
Independent gain from Conservative		Swing		

Pimhill By-Election 28 August 2008
Party	Candidate	Votes	%	±%
Conservative	John Everall	341	45.6	−34.9
Liberal Democrats	Helen Woodman	331	44.3	+44.3
BNP	Helen Foulkes	59	7.9	+7.9
Independent Anti-Incinerator Candidate	Ioan Jones	16	2.1	+2.1
Majority		10	1.3	
Turnout		747	46.5	
Conservative hold		Swing		
