= English Bridge =

Bridge across the River Severn in Shrewsbury, England

Coordinates: 52°42′23.6″N 2°44′51.4″W

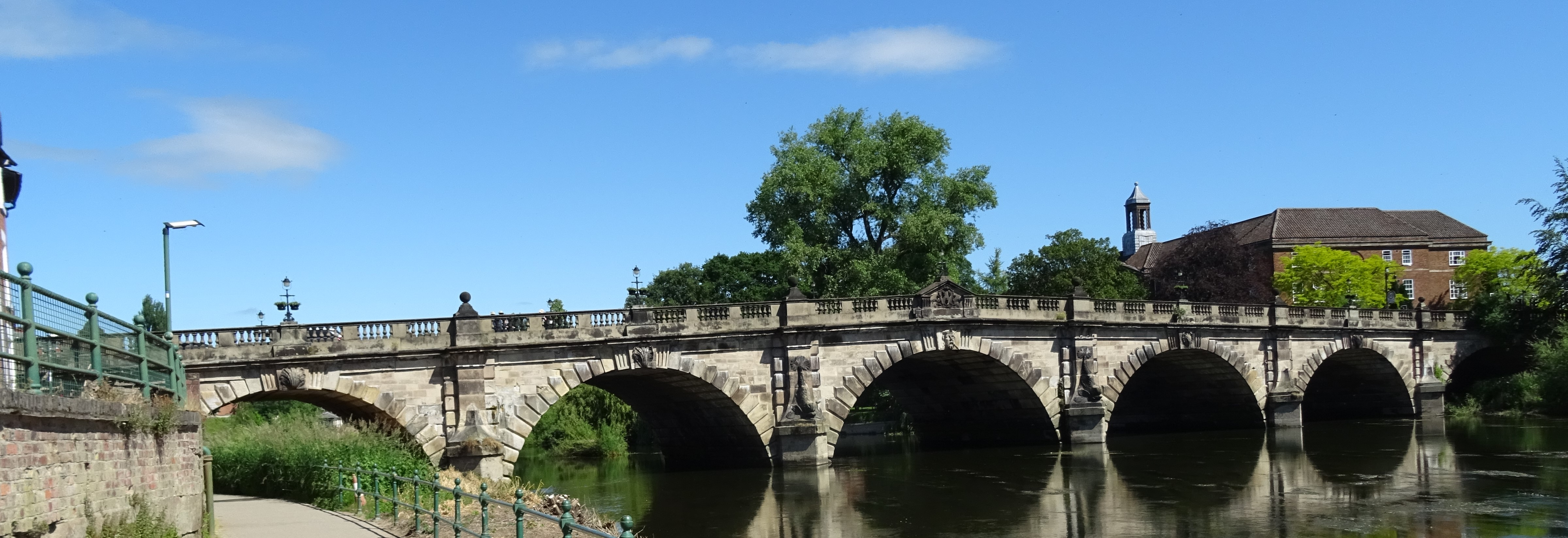
The English Bridge, with water levels at the Summer low.

The English Bridge is a masonry arch viaduct, crossing the River Severn in Shrewsbury, Shropshire. The present bridge is a 1926 rebuilding and widening (re-using the original masonry) of John Gwynn's design, completed in 1774. A bridge is known to have stood at this spot since at least Norman times. Historically, it was known as the "Stone Bridge". It is a Grade II* listed building.

== History ==
The original Norman bridge consisted of five arches and a timber causeway. It linked the town of Shrewsbury with Coleham Island, which now no longer exists, before another bridge linked the island with the other bank. A large tower stood on the East bank, housing a gate and a drawbridge. The bridge also supported several shops and houses. Building work on Gwynn's replacement bridge started on 29 June 1769, and comprised seven semicircular arches, 400 feet (120 m) long. This bridge cost £16,000. The 55-foot (17 m) span central arch was built high, to provide headroom to watercraft, but this resulted in steep approaches.

As a result, a new design was put forward in 1921 by Arthur W. Ward, the Borough Surveyor. This lowered all the arches, converting the central one into a segmental arch, reducing the height of the roadway by 5 feet (1.5 m). The new bridge was to be 50 feet (15 m) wide, more than twice as wide as Gwynn's structure (of 23 and a half feet width). It cost £86,000 and was formally opened on 26 October 1927 by Queen Mary, although it had been completed the previous year. Ward's bridge reused the old masonry, each stone carefully numbered, as well as a quantity of new stonework. Concrete was used to 'saddle' the arches and in the foundations.

The bridge is one of two bridges carrying the main east-west route over the Severn as it loops around Shrewsbury; the Welsh Bridge is its counterpart on the other side of the town. Despite the names, both bridges are in England, but the Welsh Bridge is on the side closer to Wales.

Thomas Telford's Holyhead Road, dating from 1815 and connecting London to the main sea-crossing to Ireland, used the English Bridge to cross the Severn here. The road's modern successor, the A5, now bypasses Shrewsbury and the bridge's main role today is to connect the centre of Shrewsbury with the Belle Vue and Abbey Foregate areas of the town.

== Gallery ==
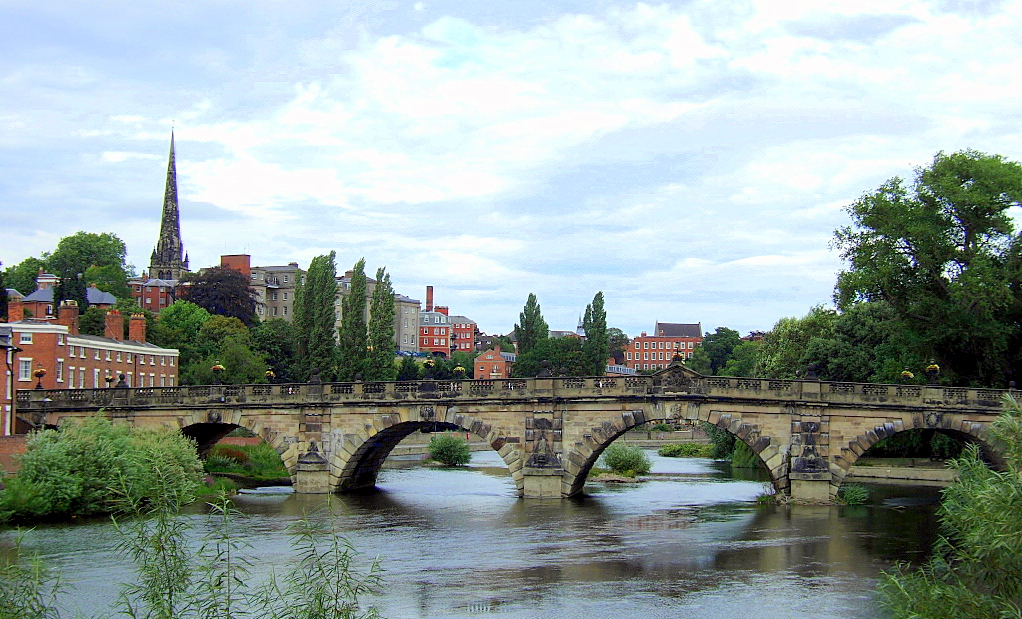
South side of the English Bridge from the east side of the river in July 2006 before the vegetation was cleared.

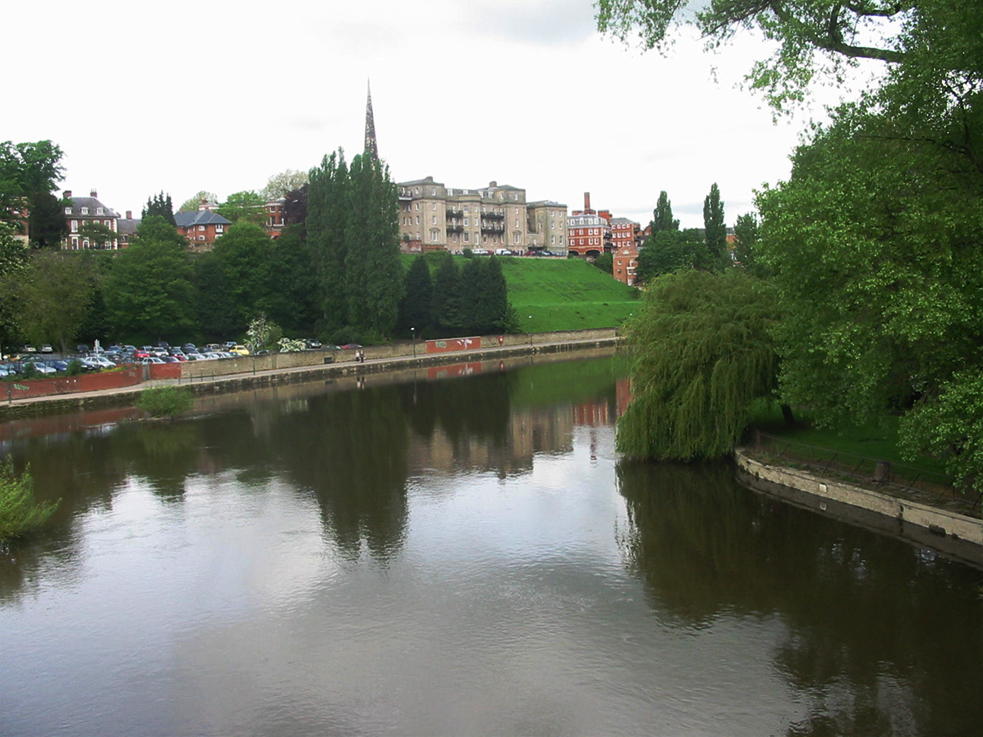
A view from the bridge looking downstream. The Abbey Gardens are on the right.

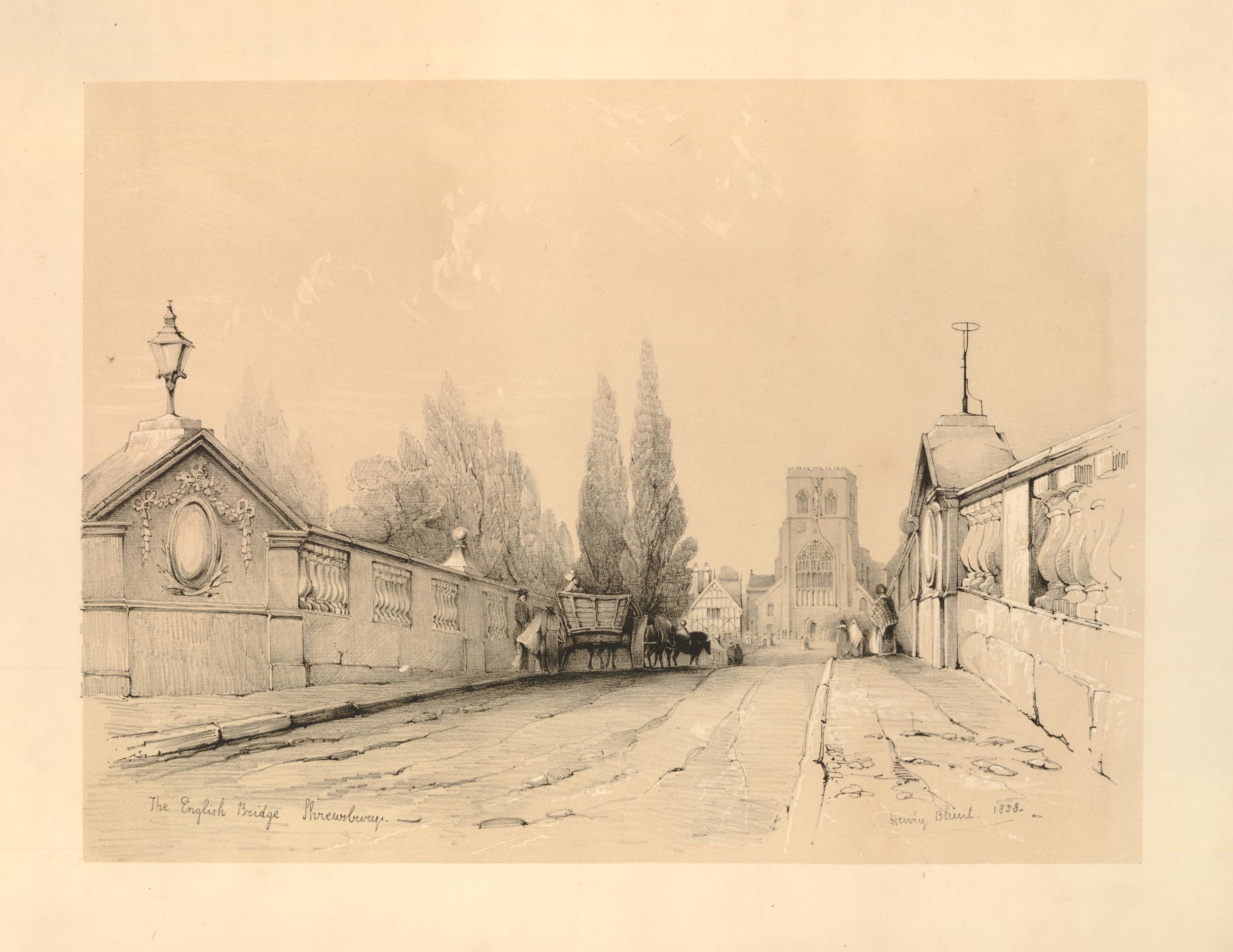
The earlier John Gwynn bridge, with the Abbey Church of Saint Peter and Saint Paul in the background, in an 1838 lithograph by Henry Blunt.

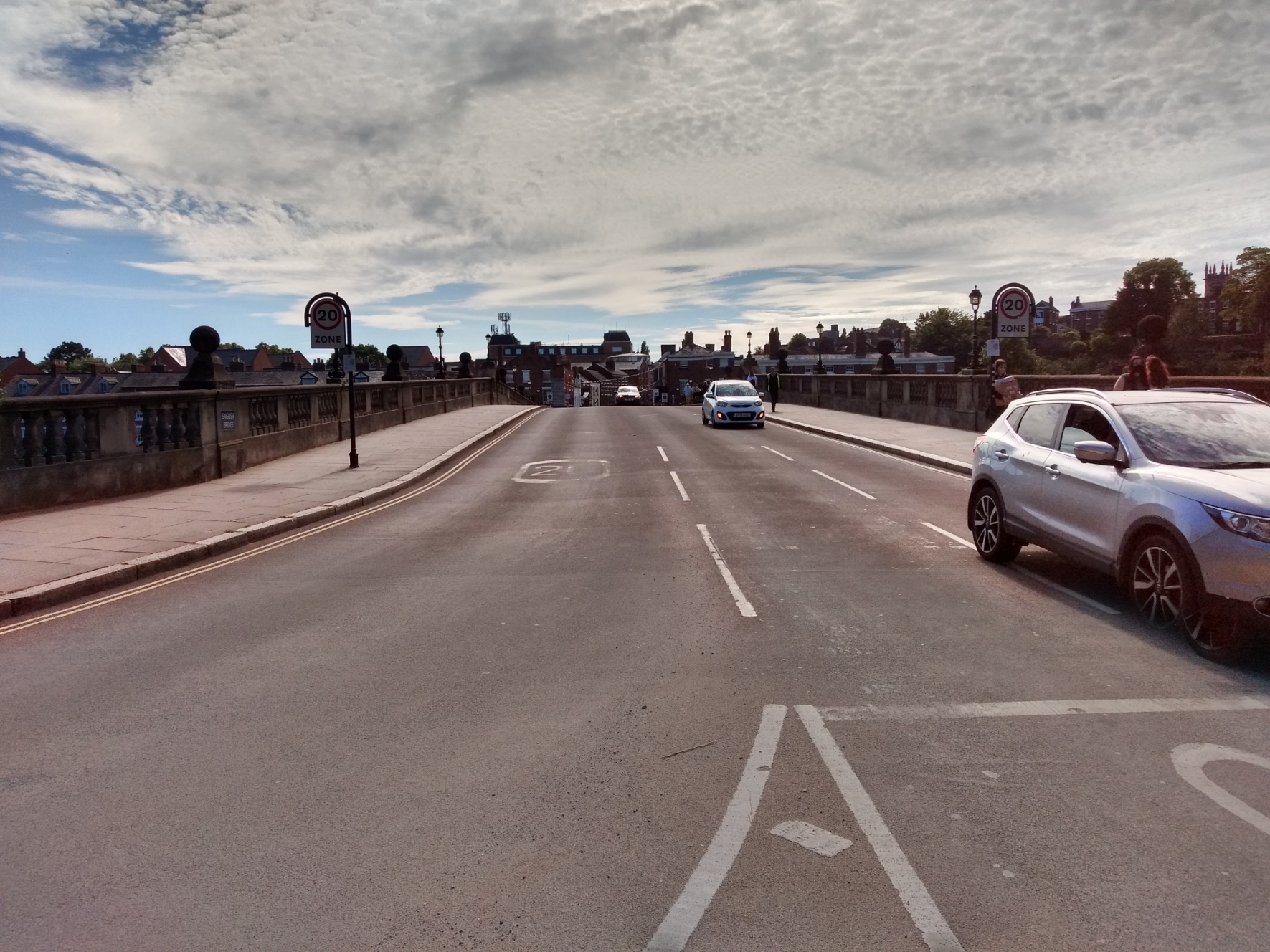
The approach to the bridge from the east at Abbey Foregate towards the Town Centre in June 2021.

== See also ==
- Welsh Bridge - the "sister" bridge on the other side of the town centre
- Crossings of the River Severn
