= University Centre Shrewsbury =

Educational institution in Shrewsbury, England

Coordinates: 52.7113°N 2.7563°W

- Motto: Small Classes, Thinking Big
- Established: 2014
- Head of Centre: Paul Johnson
- Students: 500
- Location: Shrewsbury, Shropshire
- Website: https://www.ucshrewsbury.ac.uk

University Centre Shrewsbury was a Higher Education Institution in Shrewsbury, Shropshire. As of September 2024 it is permanently closed.

Established by Shropshire Council and the University of Chester, University Centre Shrewsbury opened in autumn 2014. Postgraduate students started courses in autumn 2014 and undergraduate students began degree programmes from autumn 2015.

== Courses ==
Postgraduate courses included the Master of Business Administration and the History of Science Master's. Undergraduate courses include BA Musical Theatre, BSc Biochemistry, BA English and BSc Sport Management.

== Organisation and structure ==
University Centre Shrewsbury was overseen by a Head of Centre. It was organised into subject area groups. These consisted of:

- Arts and Humanities
- Business and Management
- Education
- Health and Social Care
- Science
- Social Sciences

== Sites ==
=== Guildhall ===
The Guildhall at Frankwell Quay was University Centre Shrewsbury's teaching and learning centre. Constructed in 2004, the building included open access computers, several lecture theatres and seminar rooms, library facilities and social spaces. Guildhall was also the headquarters for the University Centre's four research and learning centres.

=== Rowley’s House ===
Rowley's House, in the town centre, is a five-minute walk from the main teaching and learning space at Guildhall. Within the 16th Century building there were seminar spaces, postgraduate and general teaching spaces, and a University Centre helpdesk.

=== Mardol House ===
Newly redeveloped, student accommodation was offered at Mardol House, located in the town centre, close to Guildhall and Rowley's House. The accommodation provided en-suite rooms, split into self-catered flats and studio apartments. The property had four studios adapted for students with disabilities and lift access to all floors. The property also provided secure access, 24/7 security, a Residential Warden on site, a laundrette and a bike store.
