= Welsh Bridge =

Bridge across the River Severn in Shrewsbury, England

Coordinates: 52°42′36″N 2°45′28″W

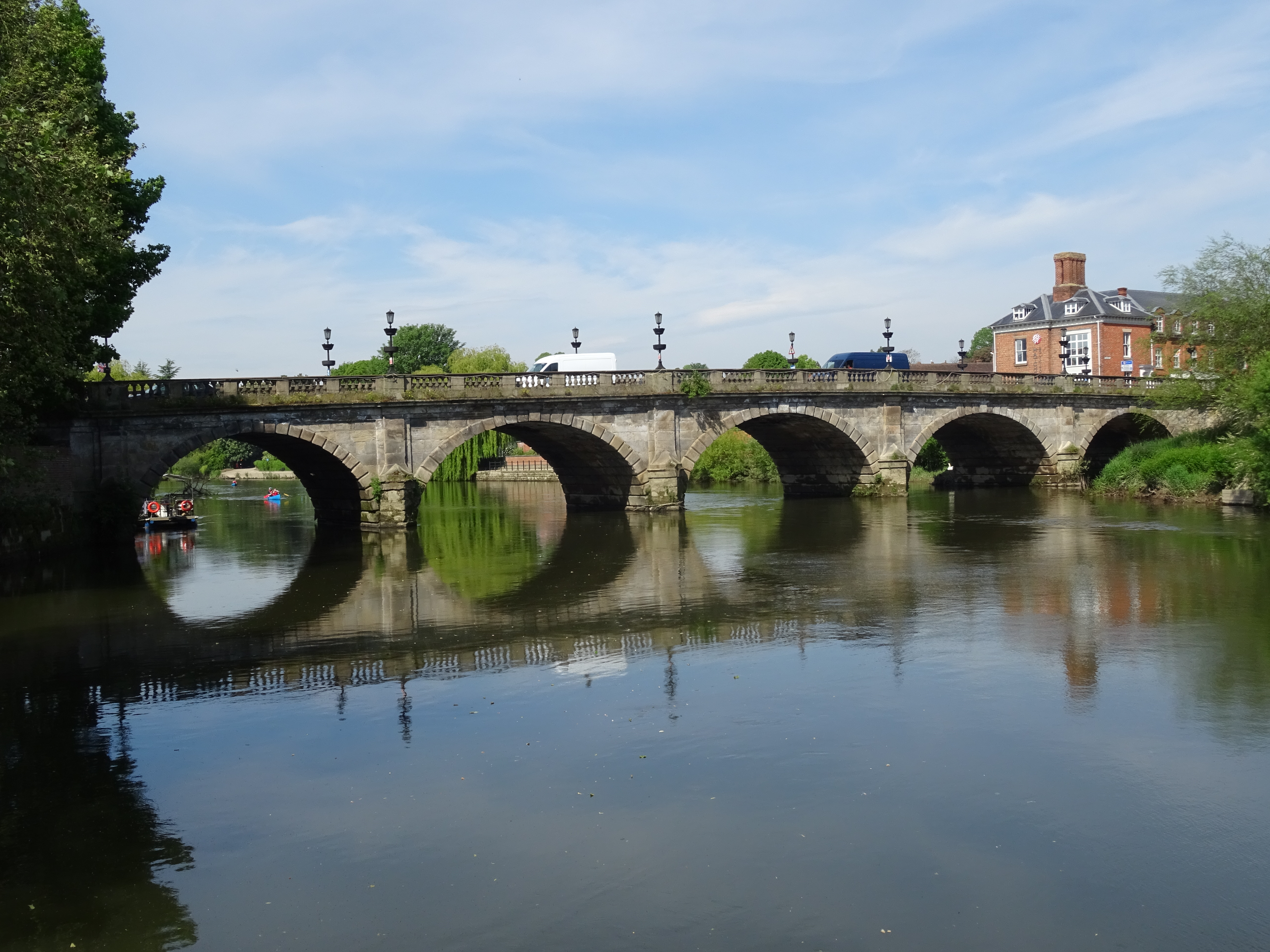
The east side of the Welsh Bridge

The Welsh Bridge is a masonry arch viaduct in the town of Shrewsbury, England, which crosses the River Severn. It connects Frankwell with the town centre. It is a Grade II* listed building. The bridge is located north-west of Shrewsbury whereas its "sister bridge", the English Bridge, is located to the east of the town.

The bridge was designed and built from 1793 to 1795 by John Tilley and John Carline (whose namesake father was a mason on the English Bridge), who had built Montford Bridge for Thomas Telford. It replaced the medieval St George's Bridge. Four of the arches span 43 feet 4 inches, while the fifth and central arch is 46 feet 2 inches, and there is a narrower towpath arch on north end. The bridge is 30 feet wide, and built from Grinshill sandstone. In total it is 266 feet long. It was completed in 1795 at a cost of £8,000.

On the south end of the bridge, on the junction with Victoria Avenue, one of the parapets of the bridge has the words "Commit No Nuisance" chiselled into the stone. This is an archaic injunction not to urinate in public.

== Gallery ==
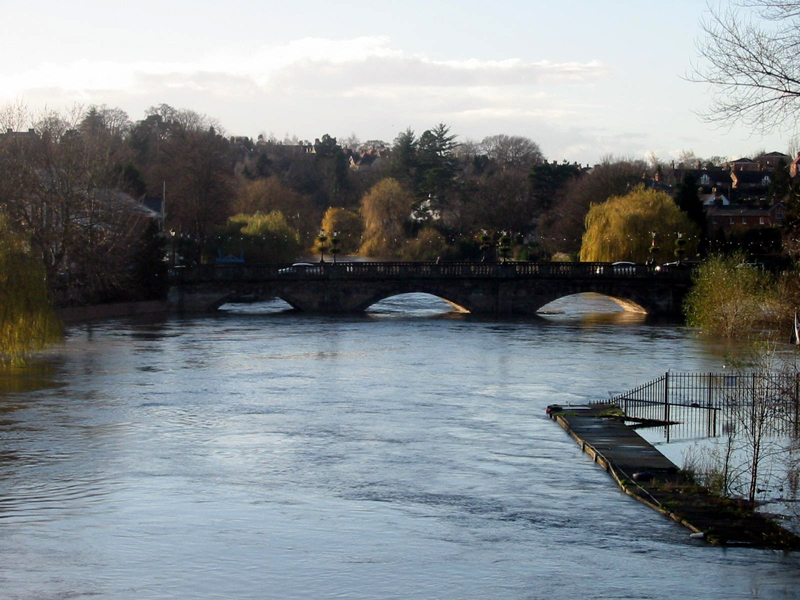
The Welsh Bridge, with the river at flood level.

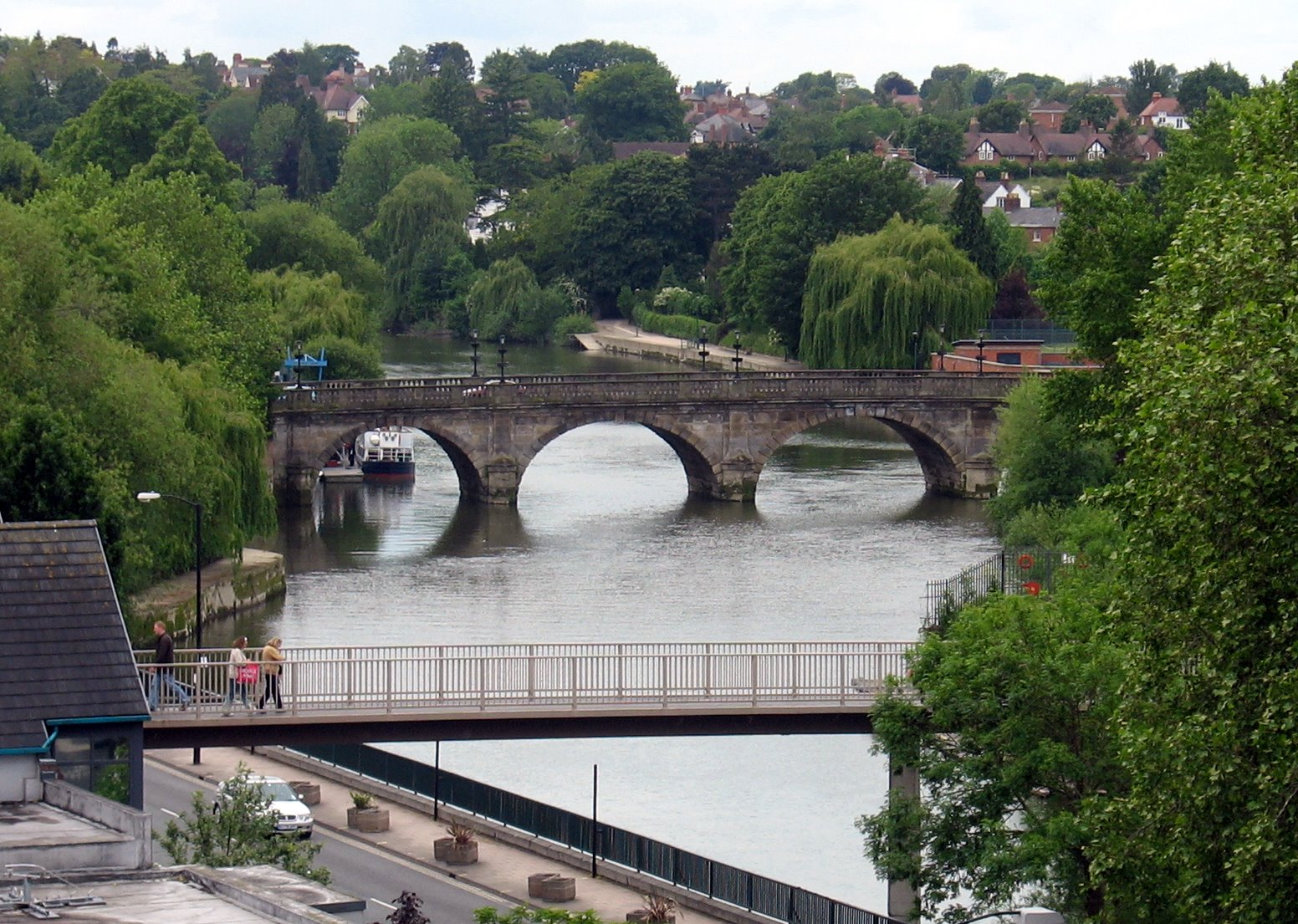
Another view, with the Frankwell Footbridge in the foreground, and normal river levels.

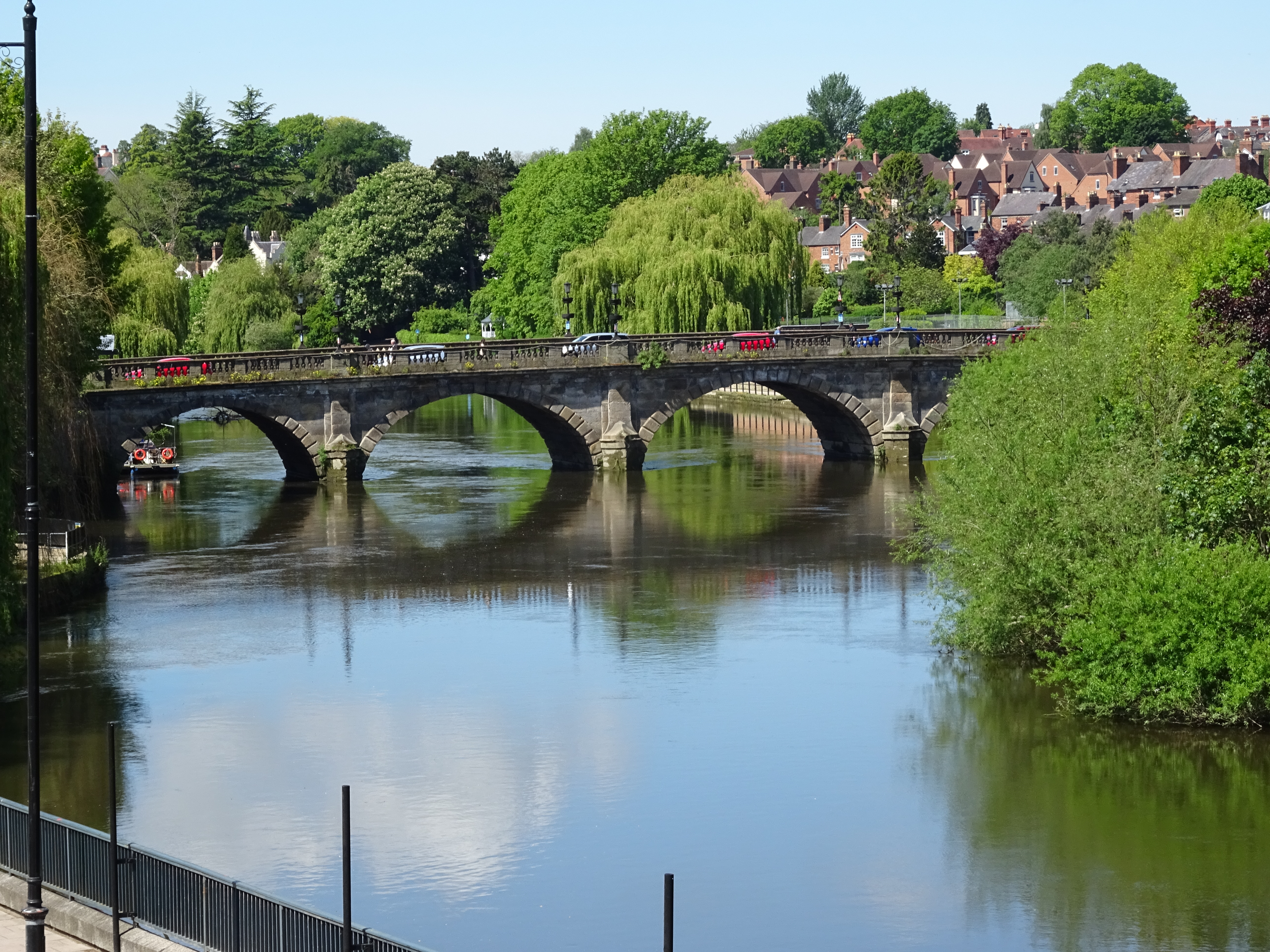
The Welsh Bridge from Frankwell Footbridge.

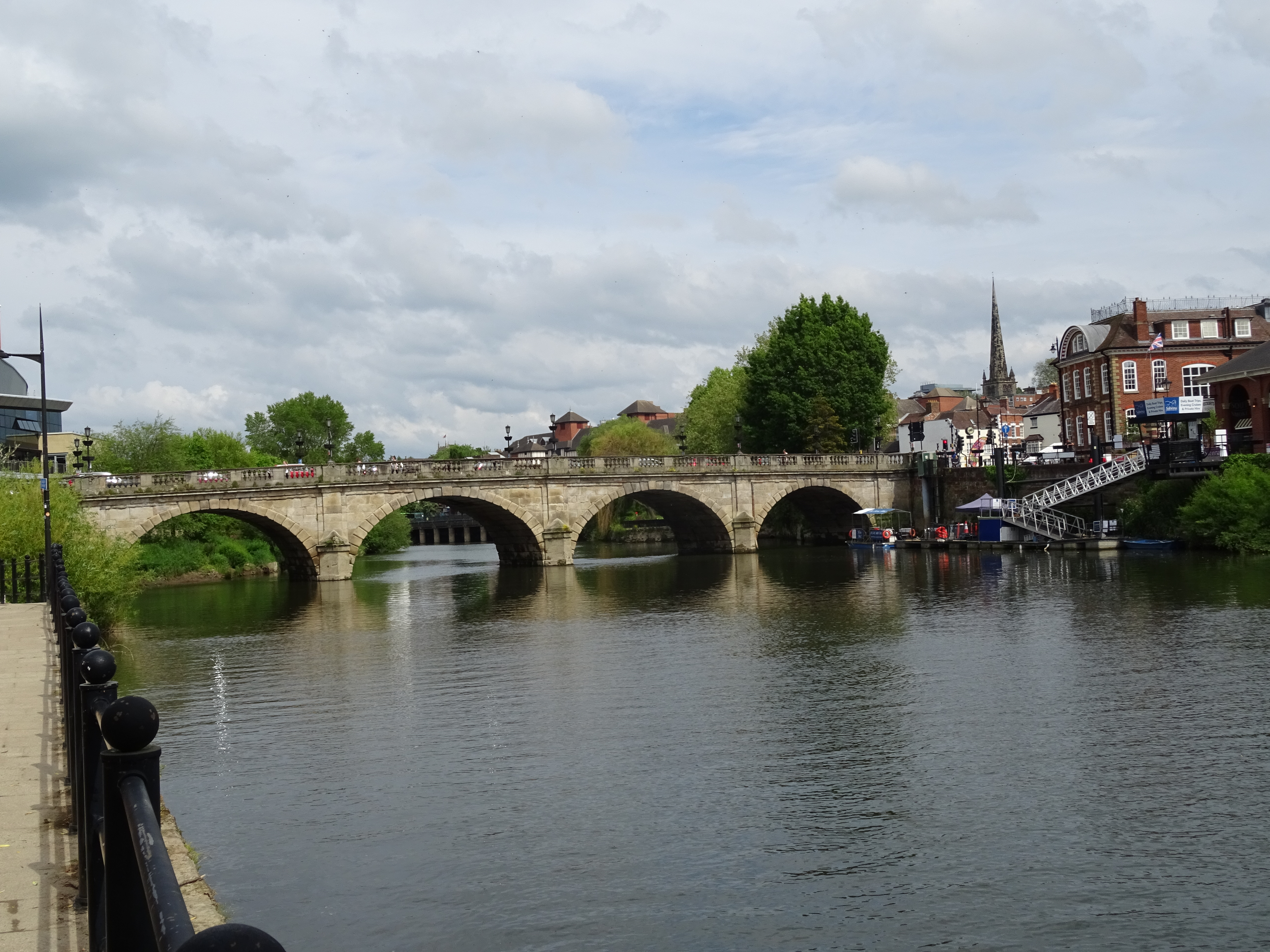
West side of the bridge showing Victoria Quay on the opposite side of the river.

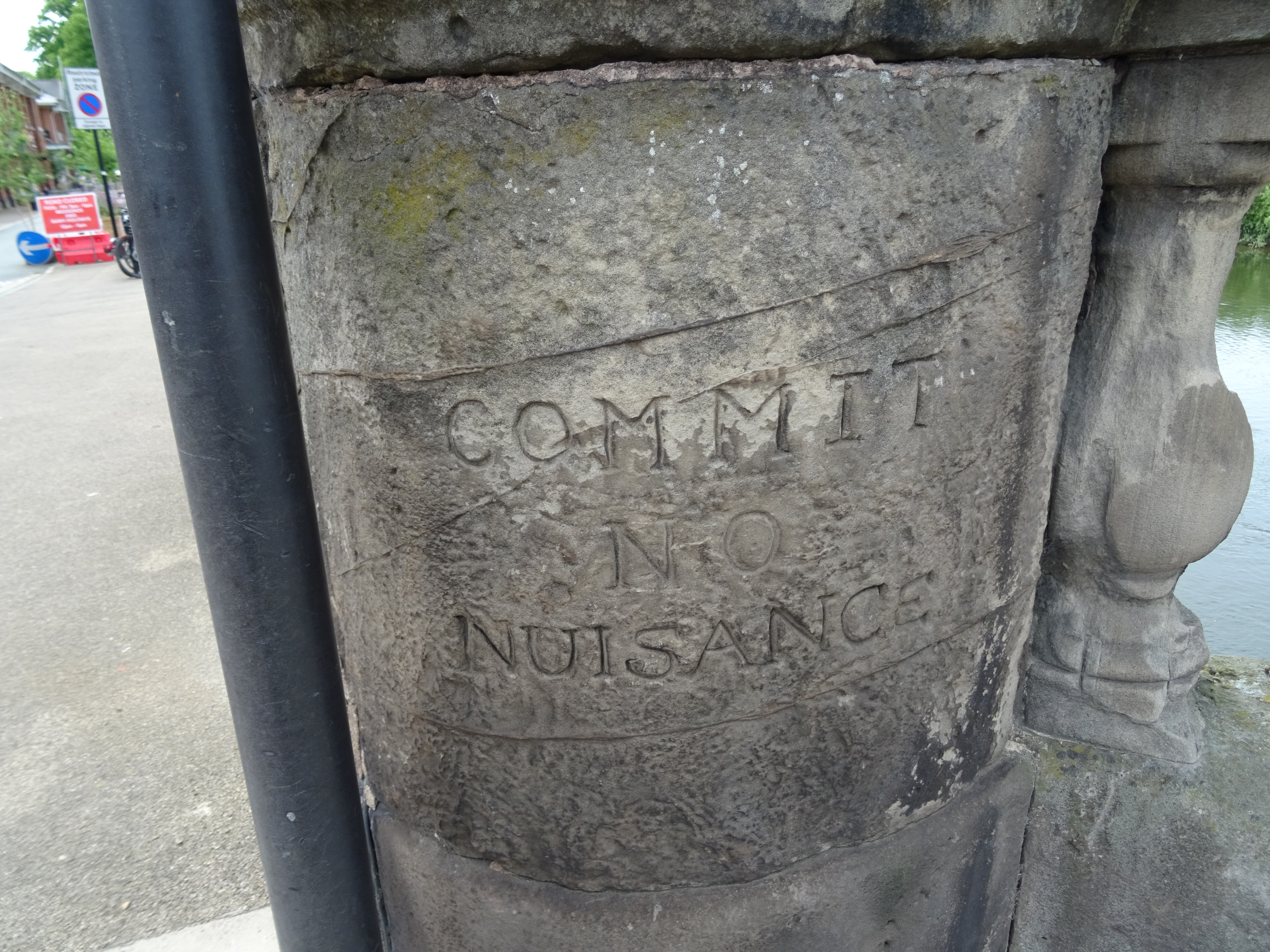
The Commit No Nuisance inscription.

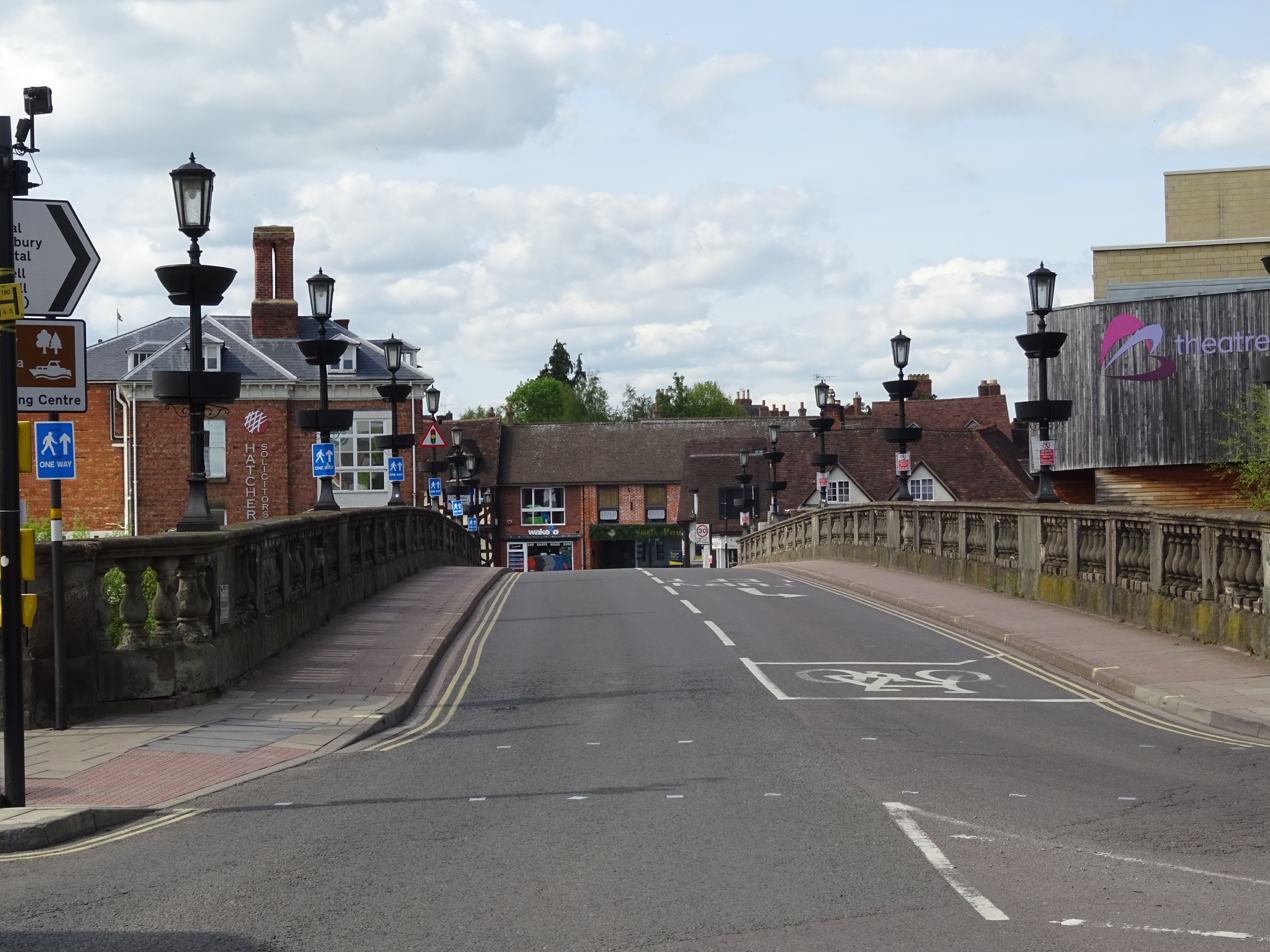
The approach to the bridge from the south at Mardol Quay in June 2021. Note the temporary signs instructing pedestrians to walk on the left pavement to aid social distancing during the COVID-19 pandemic.

== See also ==
- Crossings of the River Severn
