= Grade II* listed buildings in Shropshire (district) (H–Z) =

Shropshire shown in England

There are over 20,000 Grade II* listed buildings in England. This article comprises a list of these buildings in Shropshire (district) in the ceremonial county of Shropshire. The list has been sub-divided alphabetically, into entries beginning A-G and those beginning H-Z.

== List ==
Name	Location	Type	Completed (Note: The date given is the date used by Historic England as significant for the initial building or that of an important part in the structure's description.)	Date designated	Grid ref. (Note: The grid reference is based on the British national grid reference system, sometimes known as OSGB36, used by the Ordnance Survey.) Geo-coordinates	Entry number (Note: The "List Entry Number" is a unique number assigned to each listed building and scheduled monument by Historic England.)	Image
Nos. 46, 47, 48 and 50, Corve Street	Ludlow, Shropshire	Box Frame House	18th century	15 April 1954	SO5109075210; 52°22′22″N 2°43′11″W	1202765	Nos. 46, 47, 48 and 50, Corve Street
1 Broad Street	Ludlow	Box Frame House	1462	15 April 1954	SO5115274651; 52°22′04″N 2°43′08″W	1202835	1 Broad Street More images
27 Broad Street	Ludlow	House	Mid 18th century	15 April 1954	SO5120174464; 52°21′58″N 2°43′05″W	1291528	27 Broad Street More images
37 Broad Street	Ludlow	House	Early 18th century	15 April 1954	SO5118374412; 52°21′56″N 2°43′06″W	1219384	37 Broad Street More images
38 Broad Street	Ludlow	House	Mid 18th century	15 April 1954	SO5117974428; 52°21′57″N 2°43′06″W	1219397	38 Broad Street More images
39, Broad Street	Ludlow	House	Earlier core	15 April 1954	SO5117474444; 52°21′57″N 2°43′07″W	1202808	39, Broad Street More images
69, Old Street	Ludlow	House	1954	15 April 1954	SO5136674558; 52°22′01″N 2°42′56″W	1202878	Upload Photo
45 Bull Ring	Ludlow	Box Frame House	Early 17th century	15 April 1954	SO5122074664; 52°22′04″N 2°43′04″W	1282025	45 Bull Ring More images
1a, High Street	Ludlow	Box Frame House	17th century	15 April 1954	SO5111974644; 52°22′04″N 2°43′10″W	1290402	1a, High Street More images
14 and 15 King Street	Ludlow	Dwelling	Pre 18th century	28 October 1969	SO5118874658; 52°22′04″N 2°43′06″W	1202881	14 and 15 King Street
14 Castle Street	Ludlow	Flats	1954	15 April 1954	SO5101874652; 52°22′04″N 2°43′15″W	1281989	14 Castle Street More images
25, High Street	Shrewsbury	Department Store	Early C20	10 January 1953	SJ4914912541; 52°42′29″N 2°45′15″W	1254515	25, High Street More images
17, High Street	Shrewsbury	House	#Late C20	10 January 1953	SJ4919412498; 52°42′28″N 2°45′12″W	1254476	Upload Photo
7, The Square	Shrewsbury	House	c. 1730	10 January 1953	SJ4910312473; 52°42′27″N 2°45′17″W	1255040	7, The Square More images
8 and 9, The Square	Shrewsbury	House	1730	10 January 1953	SJ4910212463; 52°42′27″N 2°45′17″W	1270486	8 and 9, The Square More images
10, Belmont	Shrewsbury	House	Late 17th century	10 January 1953	SJ4915112261; 52°42′20″N 2°45′14″W	1246486	10, Belmont
29a and 30, Princess Street	Shrewsbury	House	c. 1720	10 January 1953	SJ4914112418; 52°42′25″N 2°45′15″W	1254736	29a and 30, Princess Street More images
15 and 16, Mardol	Shrewsbury	House	Late C20	10 January 1953	SJ4901812604; 52°42′31″N 2°45′22″W	1270705	15 and 16, Mardol More images
14 and 15 Belmont	Shrewsbury	House	Late 18th century	30 May 1969	SJ4909412234; 52°42′19″N 2°45′17″W	1271330	14 and 15 Belmont More images
14 St Mary's Street	Shrewsbury	House	Later	19 September 1972	SJ4930612501; 52°42′28″N 2°45′06″W	1270610	Upload Photo
1 and 2 Council House Courtyard	Shrewsbury	House	Earlier	10 January 1953	SJ4941912694; 52°42′34″N 2°45′00″W	1247196	1 and 2 Council House Courtyard More images
65–69 Wyle Cop	Shrewsbury	Flats	1953	10 January 1953	SJ4939012322; 52°42′22″N 2°45′02″W	1270460	65–69 Wyle Cop More images
8–15 St Alkmond's Place	Shrewsbury	Hall House	15th century	10 January 1953	SJ4923212511; 52°42′28″N 2°45′10″W	1270615	8–15 St Alkmond's Place More images
5 Dodington	Whitchurch Urban	Hall House	Mid-Late 16th century	1 March 1988	SJ5425641327; 52°58′02″N 2°40′57″W	1056010	Upload Photo
48 Mill Street	Low Town, Bridgnorth	House	c. 1675	18 July 1949	SO7201393087; 52°32′06″N 2°24′51″W	1177762	48 Mill Street More images
20 East Castle Street	Bridgnorth	House	17th century	18 July 1949	SO7170992940; 52°32′01″N 2°25′07″W	1053994	20 East Castle Street More images
17 High Street	Church Stretton	House	1952	4 November 1952	SO4531493713; 52°32′19″N 2°48′28″W	1383283	17 High Street More images
17 and 19 High Street	Clun	House	13th century or 14th century	5 June 1985	SO3015880856; 52°25′16″N 3°01′42″W	1308188	Upload Photo
25	Kempton, Clunbury	House	Late 17th century or early 18th century	1 December 1951	SO3572583008; 52°26′28″N 2°56′49″W	1054976	Upload Photo
15 Church Street	Ellesmere Urban	House	1793	19 March 1951	SJ4026534895; 52°54′29″N 2°53′23″W	1055544	Upload Photo
48 High Street	Much Wenlock	House	18th century	25 October 1950	SO6219099831; 52°35′42″N 2°33′35″W	1053824	Upload Photo
55 and 56 High Street	Much Wenlock	House	c. 1682	24 October 1950	SO6227799881; 52°35′43″N 2°33′30″W	1053825	55 and 56 High Street More images
29 Bailey Street	Oswestry	House	Early 17th century	10 September 1951	SJ2907229704; 52°51′36″N 3°03′18″W	1176028	Upload Photo
17 Green End	Whitchurch Urban	House	c. 1700	1 May 1951	SJ5429041544; 52°58′09″N 2°40′55″W	1055977	17 Green End
21 Dodington	Whitchurch Urban	House	c. 1725	1 May 1951	SJ5430041256; 52°58′00″N 2°40′55″W	1055970	Upload Photo
126 and 127 Frankwell	Shrewsbury	Inn	Late 16th century	10 January 1953	SJ4882912859; 52°42′39″N 2°45′32″W	1247648	126 and 127 Frankwell More images
19–23 St John's Hill	Shrewsbury	Terrace	c. 1750	10 January 1953	SJ4886912378; 52°42′24″N 2°45′30″W	1058972	19–23 St John's Hill More images
34–36 High Street	Bridgnorth	Timber Framed House	c. 1650	18 July 1949	SO7161093134; 52°32′07″N 2°25′12″W	1053964	34–36 High Street More images
113 and 114 Frankwell	Shrewsbury	Timber Framed House	Early 17th century	10 January 1953	SJ4878112870; 52°42′40″N 2°45′34″W	1247610	Upload Photo
15 and 16 High Street	Shrewsbury	Timber Framed House	1575	10 January 1953	SJ4919612488; 52°42′28″N 2°45′12″W	1254512	15 and 16 High Street More images
22 High Street	Shrewsbury	Timber Framed House	Late 16th century	10 January 1953	SJ4916912522; 52°42′29″N 2°45′14″W	1270760	22 High Street More images
4, 5 and 6 Frankwell	Shrewsbury	Timber Framed House	Late 16th century	10 January 1953	SJ4882012832; 52°42′39″N 2°45′32″W	1270839	4, 5 and 6 Frankwell More images
Abbey Farmhouse	Hodnet	Farmhouse	Mid 18th century	25 February 1987	SJ5759130814; 52°52′23″N 2°37′53″W	1307920	Abbey Farmhouse More images
Habberley Hall	Habberley	Jettied House	1593	29 January 1952	SJ3974003626; 52°37′37″N 2°53′30″W	1366655	Upload Photo
Hall Farm House	Aston Eyre	House	c. 1300	29 November 1951	SO6533094170; 52°32′39″N 2°30′46″W	1176744	Upload Photo
Hall Farm House	Deuxhill	Farmhouse	1601	9 March 1970	SO6979987080; 52°28′51″N 2°26′46″W	1053893	Hall Farm House
Hampton Hall	Worthen, Worthen with Shelve	House	1681–86	1 December 1951	SJ3102605618; 52°38′38″N 3°01′15″W	1055027	Upload Photo
Hardwick Hall	Hardwick, Norbury	Cruck House	14th century or 15th century	1 December 1951	SO3689790624; 52°30′35″N 2°55′52″W	1295339	Hardwick Hall
Hardwick Hall including Balustraded Terraces attached to Flanking Wings	Hardwick, Ellesmere Rural	Country House	c.1720-30	27 May 1953	SJ3756934241; 52°54′07″N 2°55′47″W	1176516	Upload Photo
Hardwick House	Shrewsbury	House	c. 1740	10 January 1953	SJ4891112383; 52°42′24″N 2°45′27″W	1058990	Hardwick House More images
Hargreaves Farmhouse at SJ 3192 1032	Westbury	Farmhouse	19th century	18 March 1986	SJ3192010320; 52°41′11″N 3°00′31″W	1055173	Upload Photo
Hatton Farmhouse	Hatton, Eaton-under-Heywood	Farmhouse	Mid 15th century	15 March 1974	SO4682590296; 52°30′29″N 2°47′06″W	1383316	Upload Photo
Hatton Grange and Garden Wall to South West with Gate and Gate Piers	Shifnal	House	1764-8	29 September 1951	SJ7646004292; 52°38′09″N 2°20′57″W	1053650	Upload Photo
Haughton Hall	Haughton, Shifnal	House	1718	26 May 1955	SJ7414608370; 52°40′21″N 2°23′02″W	1176282	Haughton Hall More images
Hazlitt House	Wem Urban	House	Early 18th century	28 August 1951	SJ5125528956; 52°51′21″N 2°43′31″W	1366784	Hazlitt House More images
Henley Hall and attached Walls, Balustrades and Steps to South	Henley, Bitterley	Country House	18th century	12 November 1954	SO5413376092; 52°22′51″N 2°40′31″W	1383667	Henley Hall and attached Walls, Balustrades and Steps to South More images
Hermon Chapel	Oswestry	Sunday School	1862	6 September 1999	SJ2898029820; 52°51′40″N 3°03′23″W	1356736	Hermon Chapel More images
High Hatton Hall	High Hatton, Stanton upon Hine Heath	Country House	1762	28 October 1960	SJ6066324870; 52°49′12″N 2°35′07″W	1055388	High Hatton Hall More images
Holt Farmhouse	Cardington	Farmhouse	c. 1580	29 January 1952	SO5349996524; 52°33′52″N 2°41′15″W	1366683	Holt Farmhouse More images
Home Farm, Apley Park	Stockton	Model Farm	Built in 1875	8 May 2012	SO7145099580; 52°35′36″N 2°25′22″W	1405557	Upload Photo
Home Farmhouse	Chatwall, Cardington	Farmhouse	c. 1700	29 January 1952	SO5130497464; 52°34′22″N 2°43′12″W	1177058	Upload Photo
Hosyers Almshouses	Ludlow	Almshouses	1758	15 April 1954	SO5111174677; 52°22′05″N 2°43′10″W	1202796	Hosyers Almshouses More images
House about 100 m to south-east of Brook House (Brook House Cottage)	Middleton, Bitterley	House	17th century	29 February 2000	SO5421577504; 52°23′37″N 2°40′27″W	1383679	Upload Photo
Ireland's Mansion	Shrewsbury	Timber Framed House	c. 1575	10 January 1953	SJ4912812520; 52°42′29″N 2°45′16″W	1254479	Ireland's Mansion More images
Jackfield Tile Museum Front Block	Jackfield, Broseley	Tile Works	1874	29 May 1990	SJ6863702976; 52°37′25″N 2°27′53″W	1367609	Jackfield Tile Museum Front Block More images
Keeper's Lodge	Acton Burnell Park, Acton Burnell	Prospect Tower	1779–1780	9 July 1985	SJ5443601591; 52°36′37″N 2°40′28″W	1307703	Keeper's Lodge More images
Lane's House and Oldgate House	Ludlow	House	Early 17th century	15 April 1954	SO5134774493; 52°21′59″N 2°42′57″W	1281952	Lane's House and Oldgate House More images
Lea Hall	Bomere Heath and District	Country House	1584	29 January 1952	SJ4927821050; 52°47′05″N 2°45′13″W	1295563	Upload Photo
Lee Old Hall	Lee, Ellesmere Rural	Farmhouse	c. 1550	27 May 1953	SJ4032532431; 52°53′10″N 2°53′18″W	1055893	Lee Old Hall More images
Lilleshall Hall	Sheriffhales	House	1829	29 August 1984	SJ7485914462; 52°43′38″N 2°22′25″W	1053678	Lilleshall Hall More images
Lord Hill's Column	Shrewsbury	Column	11814-16	10 January 1953	SJ5065012082; 52°42′15″N 2°43′54″W	1271374	Lord Hill's Column More images
Loton Park	Alberbury, Alberbury with Cardeston	Country House	c. 1670	18 March 1986	SJ3567814739; 52°43′35″N 2°57′14″W	1055246	Loton Park More images
Lower Hall	Worfield	House	18th century	9 March 1970	SO7586895763; 52°33′33″N 2°21′27″W	1053738	Lower Hall
Lower Harcourt	Stottesdon	Timber Framed House	Medieval	9 March 1970	SO6929882795; 52°26′32″N 2°27′11″W	1053749	Lower Harcourt More images
Lower House Farmhouse	Boraston	Farmhouse	Late 16th century	11 December 1954	SO6151569947; 52°19′35″N 2°33′58″W	1383412	Lower House Farmhouse More images
Lower Spoad Farmhouse and Small Farm adjoining	Newcastle on Clun	Farmhouse	14th century or 15th century	1 December 1951	SO2569682046; 52°25′53″N 3°05′39″W	1054493	Lower Spoad Farmhouse and Small Farm adjoining More images
Lower Woodcote Farmhouse	Woodcote, Bicton	Farmhouse	Mid-late 16th century	29 January 1952	SJ4515911666; 52°42′00″N 2°48′47″W	1055154	Upload Photo
Ludlow College	Ludlow	House	14th century	15 April 1954	SO5105974399; 52°21′56″N 2°43′13″W	1290137	Ludlow College More images
Ludlow College High Hall and attached Railings	Ludlow	School	Late 18th century	15 April 1954	SO5097474627; 52°22′03″N 2°43′17″W	1202786	Ludlow College High Hall and attached Railings More images
Malt House, Miller's House and Ledwyche House	Henley, Bitterley	House	c. 1987	29 October 1986	SO5407976436; 52°23′02″N 2°40′34″W	1383674	Upload Photo
Manor Farmhouse	Bedstone	Farmhouse	Late 14th century or early 15th century	1 December 1951	SO3688175570; 52°22′28″N 2°55′43″W	1366971	Manor Farmhouse More images
Manor Farmhouse	Berrington	Farmhouse	1658	14 May 1986	SJ5304106795; 52°39′25″N 2°41′44″W	1055585	Upload Photo
Manor Farmhouse	Stoney Stretton, Westbury	Farmhouse	mid to late 15th century	18 March 1986	SJ3820809488; 52°40′46″N 2°54′56″W	1366906	Upload Photo
Manor Farmhouse and Byre	Silvington, Wheathill	Farmhouse	13th century	12 November 1954	SO6204879856; 52°24′55″N 2°33′34″W	1383762	Upload Photo
Manor House	Aston Botterell	House	13th century	9 March 1970	SO6321284153; 52°27′15″N 2°32′34″W	1176724	Upload Photo
Manor House	Cleobury Mortimer	Manor House/Nursing Home	Late 17th century or early 18th century	12 November 1954	SO6722575689; 52°22′42″N 2°28′58″W	1383490	Manor House More images
Mansion House	Ford	Farmhouse	Early 17th century	29 January 1952	SJ4117113850; 52°43′09″N 2°52′21″W	1366875	Mansion House More images
Marche Manor	Westbury	Farmhouse	Late 16th century	29 January 1952	SJ3343910461; 52°41′16″N 2°59′10″W	1176448	Upload Photo
Meole Brace Church of Holy Trinity	Meole Brace, Shrewsbury	Parish Church	1867-8	30 May 1969	SJ4862010555; 52°41′25″N 2°45′42″W	1271121	Meole Brace Church of Holy Trinity More images
Micklewood Farmhouse	Longnor	Farmhouse	c. 1680	29 January 1952	SO5021098481; 52°34′55″N 2°44′10″W	1366692	Upload Photo
Middleton Chapel	Middleton, Bitterley	Church	12th century	12 November 1954	SO5400777333; 52°23′31″N 2°40′38″W	1383685	Middleton Chapel More images
Millichope Park including Terrace Balustrade	Millichope Park, Munslow	Country House	1835–1840	12 November 1954	SO5263488332; 52°29′27″N 2°41′56″W	1383365	Millichope Park including Terrace Balustrade More images
Minsterley Hall	Minsterley	House	1653	29 January 1952	SJ3734404984; 52°38′20″N 2°55′38″W	1055191	Upload Photo
Moat Farmhouse	Condover	Farmhouse	14th century or 15th century	10 March 1986	SJ4571203513; 52°37′36″N 2°48′12″W	1175206	Upload Photo
Myddle House Farmhouse including Oast House	Boraston	Farmhouse	Late 16th century	11 December 1954	SO6149969972; 52°19′35″N 2°33′59″W	1383414	Myddle House Farmhouse including Oast House More images
New Hall	Eaton-under-Heywood	House	Mid C20 restoration	12 November 1954	SO4895189146; 52°29′52″N 2°45′12″W	1383304	Upload Photo
North Lodge	Sutton upon Tern	Gate Lodge	c1822-8	7 November 1962	SJ6786433585; 52°53′55″N 2°28′45″W	1293767	Upload Photo
No 1 (Tudor House) and Part of No 2	Uppington, Wroxeter and Uppington	Jettied House	Mid 17th century	17 February 1985	SJ5979809421; 52°40′52″N 2°35′46″W	1273665	No 1 (Tudor House) and Part of No 2 More images
Oakly Park	Bromfield	House	19th century	12 November 1954	SO4864376397; 52°22′59″N 2°45′21″W	1291872	Oakly Park More images
Old Bull Ring Tavern	Ludlow	Jettied House	17th century	15 April 1954	SO5122974666; 52°22′04″N 2°43′04″W	1202785	Old Bull Ring Tavern More images
Old Church of St Chad (remains)	Shrewsbury	Church	12th century	10 January 1953	SJ4921212346; 52°42′23″N 2°45′11″W	1246491	Old Church of St Chad (remains) More images
Old Eagles Public House	Whitchurch Urban	Cruck House	14th century	1 March 1988	SJ5418841408; 52°58′05″N 2°41′01″W	1366526	Old Eagles Public House More images
Old Farmhouse	Clunton, Clunbury	Farmhouse	Late 16th century or early 17th century	1 December 1951	SO3336981313; 52°25′33″N 2°58′53″W	1054967	Old Farmhouse
Old Hall	Claverley	House	17th century	1 February 1974	SO7936193515; 52°32′21″N 2°18′21″W	1053883	Upload Photo
Old Hall	Hughley	House	Late 16th century	29 January 1952	SO5657097827; 52°34′35″N 2°38′32″W	1175458	Upload Photo
Old Hall and attached Garden Wall	Old Marton, Ellesmere Rural	Farmhouse	Mid to late 16th century	27 May 1953	SJ3465533893; 52°53′55″N 2°58′22″W	1307787	Upload Photo
Old Post Office Inn	Shrewsbury	House	Early-Mid 16th century	10 January 1953	SJ4925912379; 52°42′24″N 2°45′09″W	1270685	Old Post Office Inn More images
Old School House	Whitchurch Urban	Grammar School/Apartments	1708	1 May 1951	SJ5405241756; 52°58′16″N 2°41′08″W	1177253	Upload Photo
Oldfields Farmhouse	Moreton Say	Farmhouse	Mid 17th century	5 June 1987	SJ6285836354; 52°55′24″N 2°33′14″W	1307573	Upload Photo
Orangery and Wall and Outbuildings 90 Metres East of Hopton Court	Hopton Wafers	Hovel	c. 1820	19 October 1995	SO6419376552; 52°23′09″N 2°31′39″W	1383545	Upload Photo
Outbuildings to North of Rudge Hall	Rudge	Outbuilding	1639	9 March 1970	SO8135797780; 52°34′39″N 2°16′36″W	1367572	Upload Photo
Owen's Mansion, 23 & 24, High St	Shrewsbury	Timber Framed House	1569	10 January 1953	SJ4915912530; 52°42′29″N 2°45′14″W	1254478	Owen's Mansion, 23 & 24, High St More images
Parish Church	Aston Eyre	Parish Church	Late 12th century	9 March 1970	SO6531194083; 52°32′37″N 2°30′47″W	1053204	Parish Church More images
Parish Church of St Mary	Acton Round	Church	Mid 18th century	9 March 1970	SO6343995640; 52°33′26″N 2°32′27″W	1367846	Parish Church of St Mary More images
Park Hotel, Park Social Club	Shrewsbury	House	Late 17th century	10 January 1953	SJ4989012534; 52°42′29″N 2°44′35″W	1246399	Upload Photo
Park House (formerly listed as the Hall, New Street)	Wem Urban	Apartment	1970s	28 August 1951	SJ5146829056; 52°51′24″N 2°43′20″W	1308007	Park House (formerly listed as the Hall, New Street)
Pell Wall	Sutton upon Tern	Villa	1822-8	7 November 1962	SJ6798133191; 52°53′43″N 2°28′39″W	1190426	Upload Photo
Penkridge Hall	Leebotwood	Farmhouse	1590	8 May 1972	SO4898897629; 52°34′27″N 2°45′15″W	1366710	Penkridge Hall More images
Pentre Morgan	Ellesmere Rural	Farmhouse	1668	25 April 1988	SJ3394437050; 52°55′36″N 2°59′03″W	1055921	Pentre Morgan
Pentre-isaf	Pentre-isaf, Oswestry Rural	Farmhouse	Late 16th century	15 May 1986	SJ2380926011; 52°49′34″N 3°07′56″W	1054276	Upload Photo
Peplow Hall	Peplow, Hodnet	Country House	1725	10 February 1959	SJ6386524642; 52°49′05″N 2°32′15″W	1366127	Peplow Hall More images
Perches House	Shrewsbury	Timber Framed House	Late 16th century	10 January 1953	SJ4934012658; 52°42′33″N 2°45′05″W	1255096	Perches House More images
Saint Raphael and Saint Isidore Church	Petton	Church	Medieval	27 May 1953	SJ4403826270; 52°49′52″N 2°49′55″W	1055887	Saint Raphael and Saint Isidore Church More images
Plas Yolyn	Ellesmere Rural	Country House	Earlier	27 May 1953	SJ3477437813; 52°56′01″N 2°58′19″W	1055916	Upload Photo
Plowden Hall	Lydbury North	Cross Wing House	Mid 14th century	1 December 1951	SO3755786615; 52°28′26″N 2°55′15″W	1054564	Upload Photo
Pool Hall	Alveley, Shropshire	House	17th century	29 November 1951	SO7677683729; 52°27′04″N 2°20′35″W	1053225	Pool Hall More images
Pradoe including attached Service Ranges and Outbuildings	Ruyton-XI-Towns, Shropshire	House	1785	19 January 1952	SJ3584224848; 52°49′02″N 2°57′12″W	1054637	Pradoe including attached Service Ranges and Outbuildings
Preston Montford Hall	Preston Montford, Bicton, Shropshire	Country House	c. 1700	29 January 1952	SJ4330214331; 52°43′25″N 2°50′27″W	1295620	Preston Montford Hall More images
Prince Rupert Hotel	Shrewsbury, Shropshire	Jettied House	Early 17th century	10 January 1953	SJ4928712526; 52°42′29″N 2°45′07″W	1246913	Prince Rupert Hotel More images
Priory Gatehouse and attached Rubble Wall	Bromfield	Benedictine Monastery	12th century	12 November 1954	SO4811476834; 52°23′13″N 2°45′50″W	1218714	Priory Gatehouse and attached Rubble Wall More images
Railings and Gates to Abbey House	Shrewsbury	Gate	c. 1720	30 May 1969	SJ4996812506; 52°42′28″N 2°44′31″W	1246395	Railings and Gates to Abbey House
Range about 20 m south-east of Castle Farmhouse	Cheney Longville, Wistanstow	House	14th century	12 November 1954	SO4176284759; 52°27′28″N 2°51′31″W	1269775	Upload Photo
Reaside Manor Farmhouse	Cleobury Mortimer	Farmhouse	1954	12 November 1954	SO6747374136; 52°21′51″N 2°28′45″W	1383435	Upload Photo
Rectory	Stockton	Vicarage	c. 1702	1 February 1974	SO7291699572; 52°35′36″N 2°24′04″W	1367597	Upload Photo
Rockley Farmhouse	Chirbury with Brompton	Farmhouse	Early 17th century	21 March 1968	SO2515094585; 52°32′38″N 3°06′19″W	1054405	Upload Photo
Roman Catholic Cathedral of Our Lady Help of Christians and St Peter	Shrewsbury	Cathedral	1856	10 January 1953	SJ4915512228; 52°42′19″N 2°45′14″W	1270562	Roman Catholic Cathedral of Our Lady Help of Christians and St Peter More images
Roughton House	Roughton, Worfield	House	18th century	9 March 1970	SO7566094233; 52°32′43″N 2°21′37″W	1367590	Roughton House
Rowley's House and Rowley's Mansion	Shrewsbury	House	1618	10 January 1953	SJ4895112598; 52°42′31″N 2°45′25″W	1254524	Rowley's House and Rowley's Mansion More images
Rowton Castle and attached Stable Courtyard	Alberbury with Cardeston	Castle/Hotel	1482	29 January 1952	SJ3789412739; 52°42′31″N 2°55′14″W	1055217	Rowton Castle and attached Stable Courtyard More images
Russell House	Ludlow	House	Early 18th century	15 April 1954	SO5103674524; 52°22′00″N 2°43′14″W	1202899	Russell House More images
Sandford House	Shrewsbury	House	c. 1800	10 January 1953	SJ4943212247; 52°42′20″N 2°44′59″W	1344962	Sandford House
Sheraton House	Ellesmere Urban	House	Late 18th century	19 March 1951	SJ4023434690; 52°54′23″N 2°53′24″W	1366740	Upload Photo
Shropshire Union Canal; Allman's Bridge	Shropshire Union Canal (Edstaston Branch), Whixall	Bridge	1800-06	16 September 1987	SJ4911534900; 52°54′33″N 2°45′29″W	1237206	Shropshire Union Canal; Allman's Bridge More images
Shropshire Union Canal Starks Bridge	Shropshire Union Canal, Whixall	Canal Bridge	c1800-06	30 December 1993	SJ4917834599; 52°54′23″N 2°45′26″W	1244333	Shropshire Union Canal Starks Bridge More images
Sibdon Castle	Sibdon Carwood	Country House	Early 18th century	12 November 1954	SO4124783208; 52°26′37″N 2°51′57″W	1269822	Sibdon Castle More images
Sodylt Old Hall	Ellesmere Rural	Farmhouse	15th century	27 May 1953	SJ3448040627; 52°57′32″N 2°58′37″W	1176384	Sodylt Old Hall More images
Soulton Hall with attached Balustrade, Garden Walls and Gate Piers	Wem Rural	Farmhouse	1987	28 October 1960	SJ5438030271; 52°52′05″N 2°40′45″W	1236839	Soulton Hall with attached Balustrade, Garden Walls and Gate Piers More images
St John's House	Ludlow	House	1954	15 April 1954	SO5126574252; 52°21′51″N 2°43′02″W	1202930	St John's House More images
St Winifred's Well	Woolston, Oswestry Rural	Timber Framed House	Late C15/early 16th century	19 January 1952	SJ3222524432; 52°48′47″N 3°00′25″W	1054245	St Winifred's Well More images
Stable Block about 50 m north of Wood House with attached Wall to South	West Felton	House	Late 18th century	19 January 1952	SJ3641028925; 52°51′15″N 2°56′45″W	1367378	Upload Photo
Stable, Mixing-house, Granary and Cartshed about 50 m east of Shevlock Farmhouse	Ruyton-XI-Towns	Tack Room	1860	21 August 1986	SJ3712324055; 52°48′37″N 2°56′03″W	1054639	Upload Photo
Stables at Linley Hall	Linley, More	Courtyard	c. 1740	1 December 1951	SO3465892958; 52°31′50″N 2°57′53″W	1054589	Stables at Linley Hall
Stables, Outbuildings and attached Walls at Sibdon Castle	Sibdon Carwood	House	Early 18th century	15 March 1974	SO4118883172; 52°26′36″N 2°52′00″W	1269824	Upload Photo
Stanwardine Hall	Stanwardine in the Wood, Baschurch	Farmhouse	Earlier	27 May 1953	SJ4274627806; 52°50′41″N 2°51′05″W	1176127	Stanwardine Hall More images
Stoke Court	Greete	House	Early 17th century	12 November 1954	SO5653871275; 52°20′16″N 2°38′22″W	1383520	Stoke Court More images
Stoke Park Farmhouse	Stoke Park, Stoke upon Tern	Farmhouse	1774	25 February 1987	SJ6557227309; 52°50′32″N 2°30′45″W	1055314	Upload Photo
Stokesay Court	Onibury	Country House	c. 1889	28 January 1974	SO4444378644; 52°24′11″N 2°49′05″W	1269851	Stokesay Court More images
Stone Grange	Grinshill	House	1617	28 October 1960	SJ5252023385; 52°48′21″N 2°42′21″W	1055426	Upload Photo
Stone House	Ludlow	House	Late 18th century	15 April 1954	SO5113675096; 52°22′18″N 2°43′09″W	1281966	Stone House More images
Stove House and Dye House at Former Ditherington Flax Mill	Shrewsbury	Drying House	1800–1804	10 September 1987	SJ4984113840; 52°43′12″N 2°44′39″W	1270566	Upload Photo
Summerhouse Attached to West End of Garden Wall at Blodwel Hall	Llanyblodwel	Summerhouse	1718	19 January 1952	SJ2609122824; 52°47′52″N 3°05′51″W	1054646	Upload Photo
Summerhouse in Grounds of Number 12	Shrewsbury	Summerhouse	Early 18th century	10 January 1953	SJ4893212366; 52°42′24″N 2°45′26″W	1059012	Upload Photo
Sundial about 20 m south of Marrington Lodge	Chirbury with Brompton	Sundial	1595	21 March 1968	SO2669497633; 52°34′18″N 3°04′59″W	1055046	Upload Photo
Swan Hill Court House	Shrewsbury	Country House	1761-2	30 May 1969	SJ4903712289; 52°42′21″N 2°45′21″W	1270555	Upload Photo
Swan Inn	Bridgnorth	Inn	c. 1651	18 July 1949	SO7165193135; 52°32′07″N 2°25′10″W	1053969	Swan Inn More images
Temple 160 m east of Millichope Park House	Millichope Park, Munslow	Garden Temple	1770	15 March 1974	SO5281788315; 52°29′27″N 2°41′47″W	1383366	Temple 160 m east of Millichope Park House
Tern Bridge (that part in Atcham C.P)	Atcham	Road Bridge	1780	29 January 1952	SJ5525009312; 52°40′47″N 2°39′48″W	1055124	Tern Bridge (that part in Atcham C.P) More images
Tern Lodge and adjoining Wall	Wroxeter and Uppington	Gate Lodge	Late 18th century or Early 19th century	17 February 1985	SJ5559009387; 52°40′49″N 2°39′30″W	1267341	Tern Lodge and adjoining Wall More images
The Almshouses, and adjoining Forecourt and Garden Walls	Bomere Heath and District	Gate	1672	29 January 1952	SJ4748714778; 52°43′41″N 2°46′45″W	1055129	Upload Photo
The Bell Inn	Alveley	House	Mid 19th century	1 February 1974	SO7601884548; 52°27′30″N 2°21′16″W	1367871	The Bell Inn
The Citadel	Weston-under-Redcastle	Dower House	1824-5	28 October 1960	SJ5711328430; 52°51′06″N 2°38′18″W	1264270	The Citadel More images
The Court	Bridgnorth	House	Early 18th century	18 July 1949	SO7169493133; 52°32′07″N 2°25′07″W	1367488	Upload Photo
The Ditches Hall	Wem Rural	Farmhouse	Later	28 October 1960	SJ4961829351; 52°51′33″N 2°44′59″W	1264550	The Ditches Hall More images
The Garden House	Lydbury North	House	Mid-Late C20	2 January 1985	SO3472085102; 52°27′36″N 2°57′44″W	1054546	Upload Photo
The Golden Cross Public House	Shrewsbury	Public House	18th century	10 January 1953	SJ4921912398; 52°42′25″N 2°45′11″W	1270630	The Golden Cross Public House More images
The Guildhall	Shrewsbury	House	c. 1700	10 January 1953	SJ4936312492; 52°42′28″N 2°45′03″W	1270999	The Guildhall More images
The Hall of the former Vaughan's Mansion (part of the Music Hall)	Shrewsbury	Hall House	14th century	30 May 1969	SJ4907712402; 52°42′25″N 2°45′18″W	1254927	The Hall of the former Vaughan's Mansion (part of the Music Hall)
The Hayes	Oswestry	House	Late C20	10 September 1951	SJ2808330246; 52°51′54″N 3°04′11″W	1367338	Upload Photo
The House on Crutches and Number 41	Bishop's Castle	House	1985	28 July 1950	SO3231788955; 52°29′39″N 2°59′54″W	1367214	The House on Crutches and Number 41 More images
The Judge's Lodging	Shrewsbury	House	Early 18th century	10 January 1953	SJ4919212290; 52°42′21″N 2°45′12″W	1271318	The Judge's Lodging
The King's Head Public House	Shrewsbury	Inn	Late 15th century	10 January 1953	SJ4899412693; 52°42′34″N 2°45′23″W	1270680	The King's Head Public House More images
The Lack	Chirbury with Brompton	Farmhouse	Early 17th century	1 December 1951	SO2651693860; 52°32′15″N 3°05′05″W	1054410	The Lack More images
The Lawns	Broseley	House	Early 18th century	24 October 1950	SJ6779801438; 52°36′35″N 2°28′37″W	1053900	The Lawns More images
The Lodge	Overton, Richard's Castle (Shropshire)	Country House	Earlier core	12 November 1954	SO5001172178; 52°20′43″N 2°44′07″W	1383781	Upload Photo
The Lyth	Ellesmere Rural	Country House	Later	27 May 1953	SJ4116133639; 52°53′49″N 2°52′34″W	1055920	Upload Photo
The Malthouse at Easthope Cottage Farm	Easthope	Cross Wing House	15th century	1 February 1985	SO5660095320; 52°33′14″N 2°38′30″W	1053710	Upload Photo
The Manor House	Little Stretton, Church Stretton	Farmhouse	15th century	4 July 1952	SO4435091831; 52°31′17″N 2°49′18″W	1383251	The Manor House More images
The Mount	Shrewsbury	House	c. 1800	10 January 1953	SJ4852913069; 52°42′46″N 2°45′48″W	1247658	The Mount More images
The Old Bell	Ludford	Timber Framed House	c. 1614	12 November 1954	SO5133574166; 52°21′48″N 2°42′58″W	1202820	The Old Bell More images
The Old Church	Hopton Cangeford	House	2000	12 November 1954	SO5485080393; 52°25′11″N 2°39′55″W	1383734	The Old Church More images
The Old Council House	Shrewsbury	Bishops Palace	Later	10 January 1953	SJ4944612710; 52°42′35″N 2°44′59″W	1270996	The Old Council House
The Old Hall	Wollerton, Hodnet	Cross Wing House	Late 16th century	10 February 1959	SJ6243529595; 52°51′45″N 2°33′34″W	1055350	The Old Hall More images
The Old Hall	Withington	House	1985	29 January 1952	SJ5768813026; 52°42′48″N 2°37′40″W	1222792	Upload Photo
The Old House, 41, Shropshire St	Market Drayton	House	c1680-1700	7 May 1952	SJ6745134049; 52°54′10″N 2°29′07″W	1056084	Upload Photo
The Old House, 20, Dogpole	Shrewsbury	House	c. 1600	10 January 1953	SJ4936712423; 52°42′26″N 2°45′03″W	1247171	Upload Photo
The Old Mansion, St Mary's St	Shrewsbury	House	Early 17th century	10 January 1953	SJ4928412540; 52°42′29″N 2°45′07″W	1270572	Upload Photo
The Old Porch House	Shrewsbury, Shropshire	House	Earlier	10 January 1953	SJ4899112366; 52°42′24″N 2°45′23″W	1270554	The Old Porch House More images
The Old Rectory	Richard's Castle	House	2000	12 November 1954	SO4956770988; 52°20′05″N 2°44′30″W	1383777	Upload Photo
The Old Rectory	Whitchurch Urban	House	1749	1 May 1951	SJ5417642043; 52°58′26″N 2°41′02″W	1056008	Upload Photo
The Old Shop	Whitchurch Urban	Hall House	c. 1600	1 May 1951	SJ5416041581; 52°58′11″N 2°41′02″W	1178117	The Old Shop
The Old Tudor Steak House	Shrewsbury	House	Mid 16th century	10 January 1953	SJ4922212567; 52°42′30″N 2°45′11″W	1271305	The Old Tudor Steak House More images
The Porch House	Bishop's Castle	House	17th century	28 July 1950	SO3232788928; 52°29′39″N 2°59′53″W	1367213	The Porch House More images
The Rectory	Bridgnorth, Shropshire	House	18th century	18 July 1949	SO7168292877; 52°31′59″N 2°25′08″W	1367500	The Rectory More images
The Rectory	Ludlow	House	14th century	15 March 1974	SO5110274740; 52°22′07″N 2°43′11″W	1220817	The Rectory More images
The Stable Block	Attingham Park, Atcham	Courtyard	c. 1785	29 January 1952	SJ5481410037; 52°41′10″N 2°40′12″W	1176848	The Stable Block More images
The Tan House	Little Stretton, Church Stretton	House	c. 1910	4 July 1952	SO4432591706; 52°31′13″N 2°49′19″W	1383253	The Tan House More images
The Town Hall	Bishop's Castle	Town Hall	c. 1765	28 July 1950	SO3234488950; 52°29′39″N 2°59′53″W	1054552	The Town Hall More images
The Vicarage	Claverley	Timber Framed House	15th century	29 November 1951	SO7928093388; 52°32′17″N 2°18′25″W	1053884	The Vicarage More images
The Vicarage	Cleobury Mortimer	House	C20 alterations	12 November 1954	SO6737375729; 52°22′43″N 2°28′51″W	1383441	Upload Photo
The Vicarage	Clun	Vicarage	Late 17th century	1 December 1951	SO3008080588; 52°25′08″N 3°01′46″W	1176091	The Vicarage More images
The White House	Munslow	House	Early 19th century additions	28 October 1969	SO5102486751; 52°28′35″N 2°43′21″W	1383349	The White House More images
Tilley Hall and Attached Walls to Front and Rear	Tilley, Wem Rural, Shropshire	Farmhouse	1613	28 October 1960	SJ5072127893; 52°50′47″N 2°43′59″W	1237088	Tilley Hall and Attached Walls to Front and Rear More images
Tithe Barn at Home Farm	Hodnet Park, Hodnet	Tithe Barn	1619	10 February 1959	SJ6106428183; 52°50′59″N 2°34′47″W	1307896	Tithe Barn at Home Farm More images
Town Hall	Bridgnorth	Town Hall	c. 1650	18 July 1949	SO7162293171; 52°32′08″N 2°25′11″W	1053998	Town Hall More images
Town Walls	Shrewsbury	Town Wall	13th century	10 January 1995	SJ4897412283; 52°42′21″N 2°45′24″W	1254934	Town Walls More images
Trinity Hospital	Clun, Shropshire	Courtyard	1607	1 December 1951	SO3030381083; 52°25′24″N 3°01′35″W	1054455	Trinity Hospital More images
Tudor Cottage	Church Stretton, Shropshire	House	Late 18th century remodelling	4 July 1952	SO4520893468; 52°32′11″N 2°48′33″W	1383300	Tudor Cottage
Tudor House Restaurant	Market Drayton, Shropshire	House	Mid 17th century	7 May 1952	SJ6752834150; 52°54′14″N 2°29′03″W	1307835	Tudor House Restaurant More images
Tunstall Hall	Norton in Hales, Shropshire	Country House	c. 1732	10 February 1959	SJ6905835368; 52°54′53″N 2°27′42″W	1177499	Tunstall Hall
Underhill Hall	Smethcott, Shropshire	Farmhouse	c. 1700	7 April 1986	SJ4303600883; 52°36′10″N 2°50′33″W	1177560	Upload Photo
Upper Berwick	Upper Berwick, Bomere Heath and District, Shropshire	Country House	c. 1690	29 January 1952	SJ4721315914; 52°44′18″N 2°47′00″W	1175287	Upload Photo
Upper Earnstrey Park	Abdon, Shropshire	Farmhouse	16th century	15 March 1974	SO5828987404; 52°28′59″N 2°36′56″W	1383598	Upload Photo
Upper Ledwyche Farmhouse and Horse Engine House to Rear	Bitterley	Farmhouse	C15/C16	29 February 2000	SO5538479209; 52°24′33″N 2°39′26″W	1383663	Upper Ledwyche Farmhouse and Horse Engine House to Rear
Various Workshop Buildings attached to East Side of Front Block at Jackfield Tile Museum	Jackfield, Broseley	Workshop	c. 1874	26 May 1992	SJ6869202948; 52°37′24″N 2°27′50″W	1254402	Various Workshop Buildings attached to East Side of Front Block at Jackfield Tile Museum
Walcot Hall	Lydbury North	Country House	Pre 1763	1 December 1951	SO3486884980; 52°27′32″N 2°57′36″W	1054543	Walcot Hall More images
Walleybourne Farmhouse	Church Pulverbatch	Farmhouse	c. 1400	10 March 1986	SJ4259504470; 52°38′06″N 2°50′59″W	1366962	Upload Photo
Walton Hall Farmhouse	Worthen with Shelve	Farmhouse	15th century	21 March 1968	SJ2992505348; 52°38′29″N 3°02′13″W	1055032	Upload Photo
Warden's House and Chapel adjoining Trinity Hospital at South-east Corner	Clun	House	c. 1857	1 December 1951	SO3033781073; 52°25′23″N 3°01′33″W	1054456	Upload Photo
Watch Tower and adjoining Wall	Shrewsbury	Watch Tower	13th century	10 January 1953	SJ4900612232; 52°42′19″N 2°45′22″W	1270530	Watch Tower and adjoining Wall More images
Welsh Bridge at SJ 488 127	Shrewsbury	Bridge	1792-5	10 January 1953	SJ4888012771; 52°42′37″N 2°45′29″W	1246191	Welsh Bridge at SJ 488 127 More images
Weston Hall	Weston Rhyn	Farmhouse	19th century	2 September 1987	SJ2847435106; 52°54′31″N 3°03′54″W	1178108	Upload Photo
White Abbey and Section of Wall adjoining to East	Alberbury with Cardeston	Farmhouse	c. 1578	29 January 1952	SJ3754515222; 52°43′52″N 2°55′35″W	1366885	White Abbey and Section of Wall adjoining to East
Whitehall	Shrewsbury	Timber Framed House	1578–1582	30 May 1969	SJ5023412495; 52°42′28″N 2°44′17″W	1254660	Whitehall More images
Whitehall Gatehouse	Shrewsbury	Gatehouse	c. 1580	30 May 1969	SJ5020112506; 52°42′28″N 2°44′19″W	1254671	Whitehall Gatehouse More images
Whitton Hall	Westbury	Country House	c1720-30	29 January 1952	SJ3457709099; 52°40′32″N 2°58′09″W	1055207	Whitton Hall More images
Willey Hall	Willey, Barrow	Country House	1813	24 October 1950	SO6668399207; 52°35′23″N 2°29′36″W	1367858	Willey Hall More images
Windsor House	Shrewsbury	House	Late 18th century	10 January 1953	SJ4935012643; 52°42′33″N 2°45′04″W	1270535	Windsor House More images
Windsor Lodge	Shrewsbury	House	Late 18th century	23 June 1980	SJ4933212655; 52°42′33″N 2°45′05″W	1246909	Upload Photo
Wolverton Manor	Eaton-under-Heywood	Farmhouse	15th century	12 November 1954	SO4702187892; 52°29′11″N 2°46′54″W	1383305	Upload Photo
Woodhouse including attached Service Range to North	West Felton	House	1773-4	19 January 1952	SJ3641728835; 52°51′12″N 2°56′44″W	1054231	Upload Photo
Woolstaston Hall and Garden Wall adjoining to East	Woolstaston	Country House	c. 1675	29 January 1952	SO4513098375; 52°34′49″N 2°48′40″W	1177793	Woolstaston Hall and Garden Wall adjoining to East More images
Woundale Farm House	Claverley	Farmhouse	17th century	9 March 1970	SO7728593088; 52°32′07″N 2°20′11″W	1053912	Upload Photo
Wycherley Hall	Baschurch	Farmhouse	C20	27 May 1953	SJ4181027259; 52°50′23″N 2°51′55″W	1055965	Upload Photo
Yeaton Peverey	Bomere Heath and District	Country House	1890–1892	31 May 1973	SJ4424518796; 52°45′50″N 2°49′40″W	1295602	Yeaton Peverey
Shrewsbury War Memorial	Shrewsbury	War memorial	1922	17 November 1995	SJ4874812460; 52°42′27″N 2°45′36″W	1270484	Shrewsbury War Memorial More images

== See also ==
- Grade I listed buildings in Shropshire
