= Harriet L. Childe-Pemberton =

English writer (1852–1922)

- Born: 1 April 1852; St Leonards-on-Sea, Sussex
- Died: 13 December 1921; Malvern, Worcestershire
- Occupations: Writer, poet, playwright, novelist

Harriet Louisa Childe-Pemberton (1 April 1852 – 13 December 1921) was an English author of the late-nineteenth and early-twentieth centuries.

== Biography ==
Harriet Louisa Childe-Pemberton was born in 1852, in St Leonards-On-Sea, Sussex, and raised at Millichope Park, Munslow, Shropshire, the daughter of Charles Orlando Childe-Pemberton and Augusta Mary Shakespear Childe-Pemberton. In 1859, her father served as Sheriff of Shropshire. In 1870, she was presented to Queen Victoria. Her younger brother William Shakespear Childe-Pemberton (1859–1924) was also a writer, best known as a biographer.

Childe-Pemberton lived in London later in life, and wrote plays, poems, short stories, novels, and literary criticism. Her 1882 story "All My Doing; or, Red Riding-Hood Over Again" remains of interest to literary scholars, for its unique retelling of the classic Little Red Riding Hood tale. Several of her books were published by the Society for Promoting Christian Knowledge.

She died in 1921 at Wyche Cottage, in Malvern, Worcestershire.

== Selected works ==
=== Poetry ===
- Love Knows – and Waits, and Other Poems
- "A Gift" and "The Nightingale's Song", in A Crown of Flowers: poems and pictures collected from the Girl's Own Paper (1883)
- "Was It an Angel's Song?" in Peterson's Magazine (January 1883)
- "Bye and Bye" in Peterson's Magazine (March 1884)
- "The Last Word", in Frank Leslie's Popular Monthly (April 1885)
- Nenuphar: The Four-Fold Flower of Life (poems, 1911)
- In a Tuscan Villa And Other Poems

=== Plays and dramatic recitations ===
- Prince, A Story of the American War (1881)
- The Tiger Tamed (a libretto, 1885)
- Dead letters, and other narrative and dramatic pieces (1896)
- A Backward Child (1899)
- Nicknames: A Comedietta in One Act (c. 1900)
- Twenty Minutes: Drawing Room Duologues (c. 1900)
- Original Readings and Recitations

=== Fiction ===
- The Story of Stella Peel (1880)
- Under the Trees (1881)
- The Fairy Tales of Every Day (1882), includes "All My Doing; Or, Red Riding-Hood Over Again"
- No Beauty (1884)
- Birdie: A Tale of Child Life (1888)
