= Bridgnorth Town Hall =

Municipal building in Bridgnorth, Shropshire, England

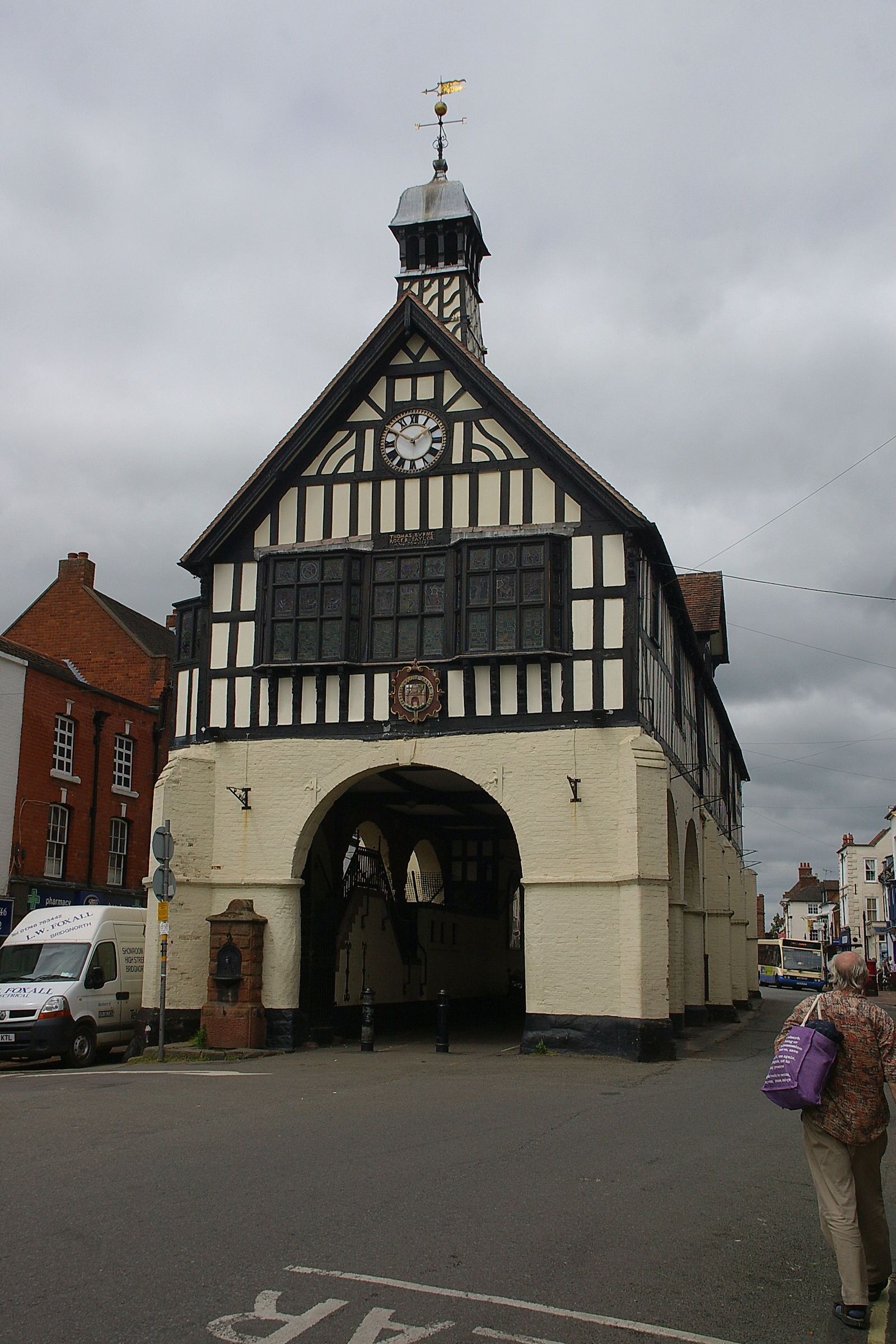
- Bridgnorth Town Hall

- Shown in Shropshire
- 52.5357°N 2.4198°W
- Location: High Street, Bridgnorth

History
- Built: 1652

Site notes
- Architectural style: Tudor style

Listed Building – Grade II*
- Official name: Town Hall
- Designated: 18 July 1949
- Reference no.: 1053998

Bridgnorth Town Hall is a municipal building in the High Street, Bridgnorth, Shropshire, England. The town hall, which is a meeting place of Bridgnorth Town Council, is a Grade II* listed building.

== History ==
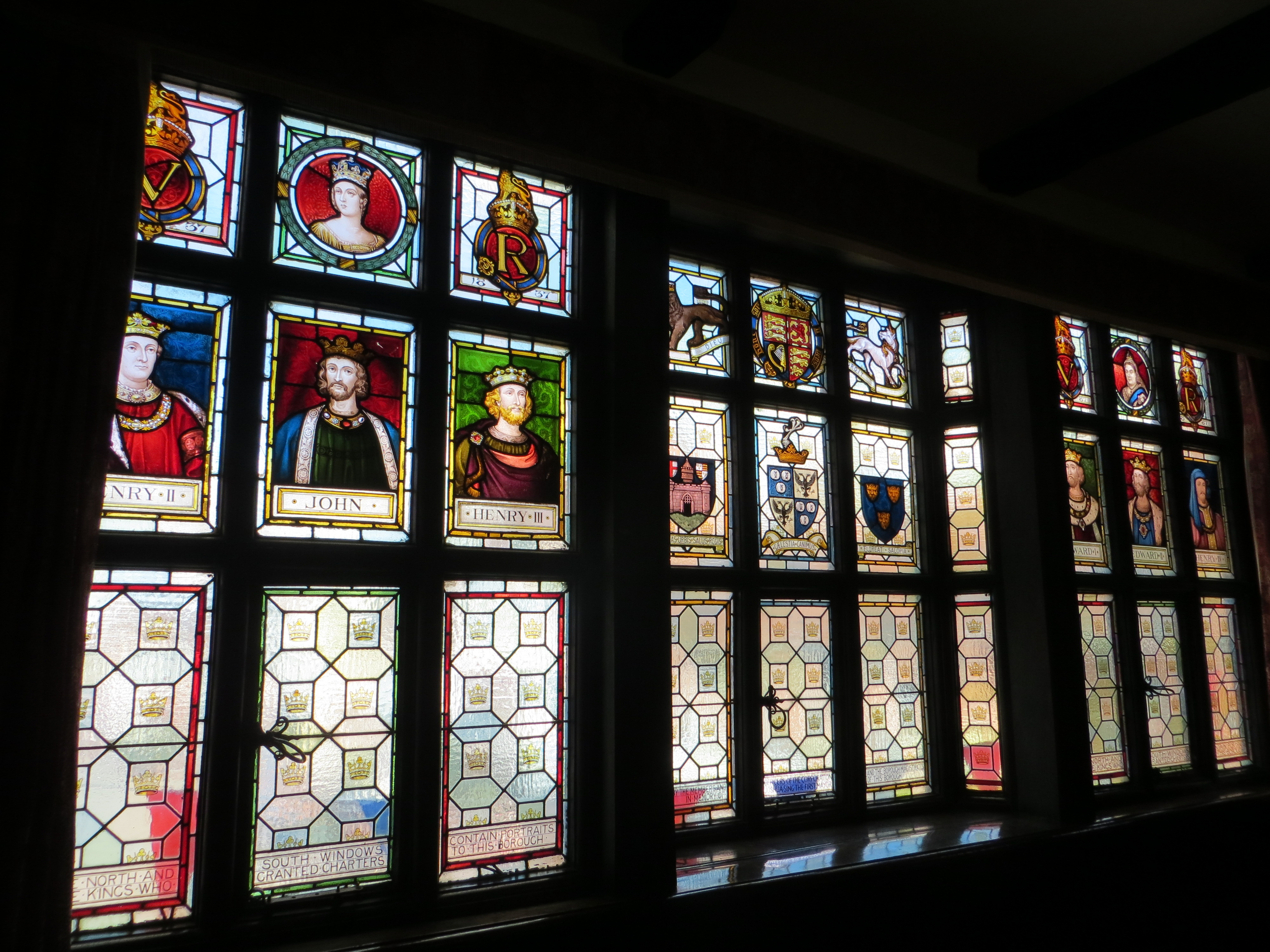
The stained glass windows in Bridgnorth Town Hall

The original civic meeting place in the town was the burgess hall on the first floor of the North Gate which was completed in 1270. The official troupe of actors known as King's Men performed in the town hall when they visited the town in 1603.

A new town hall was constructed in the High Street by taking an old oak framed tithe barn that had been donated by Lady Bertie, the wife of Sir Roger Bertie, the lord of the manor at Much Wenlock, and placing it on arches in 1652. The arches on the ground floor were left open to allow markets to be held; at both the north and south ends of the building there were single arches large enough to permit carriage access with the town's coat of arms installed above. There was a three-part window on the first floor at each end with a gable and a turret at roof level. A sign on the wall above the window at the south end suggests the building was constructed by a Thomas Burne and a Roger Taylor. Internally, the principal rooms on the first floor were a council chamber and a courtroom. The clock in the gable at the south end was installed in 1680 while the clock at the north end was installed at a later date.

The building was used for cultural events: an audience attended a "grand miscellaneous concert" there in 1789. It was refurbished and stained glass windows were installed to celebrate the Golden Jubilee of Queen Victoria in 1887. The stained glass windows depicted all the kings and queens who had granted charters to the town from 1157 to 1830. A carpet made at the Southwell Carpet Factory, which had been established by Thomas Martin Southwell on the site of the old Bridgnorth Greyfriars Monastery in 1824, was installed in the council chamber at that time.

The town hall continued to act as the local civic meeting place until the local board of health commissioned the new market hall in Postern Gate in 1859. The Postern Gate building was disliked by market traders and despite the local board of health taking legal action against traders to try and force the use of the building, the development was not a commercial success and it was sold off in the early 20th century. A drinking fountain which was decorated with two doves and cast by the Saracen Foundry was installed outside the town hall in the late 19th century.

Although Bridgnorth District Council established offices for council officers and their staff at Westgate, the town hall remained a focus of civic activity and it became a regular meeting place for Bridgnorth Town Council when it was formed in 2009. A programme of refurbishment works was completed in 2015.

== See also ==
- Grade II* listed buildings in Shropshire Council (H–Z)
