= The White House, Aston Munslow =

Grade II* listed building in Aston Munslow, Shropshire, England

The White House
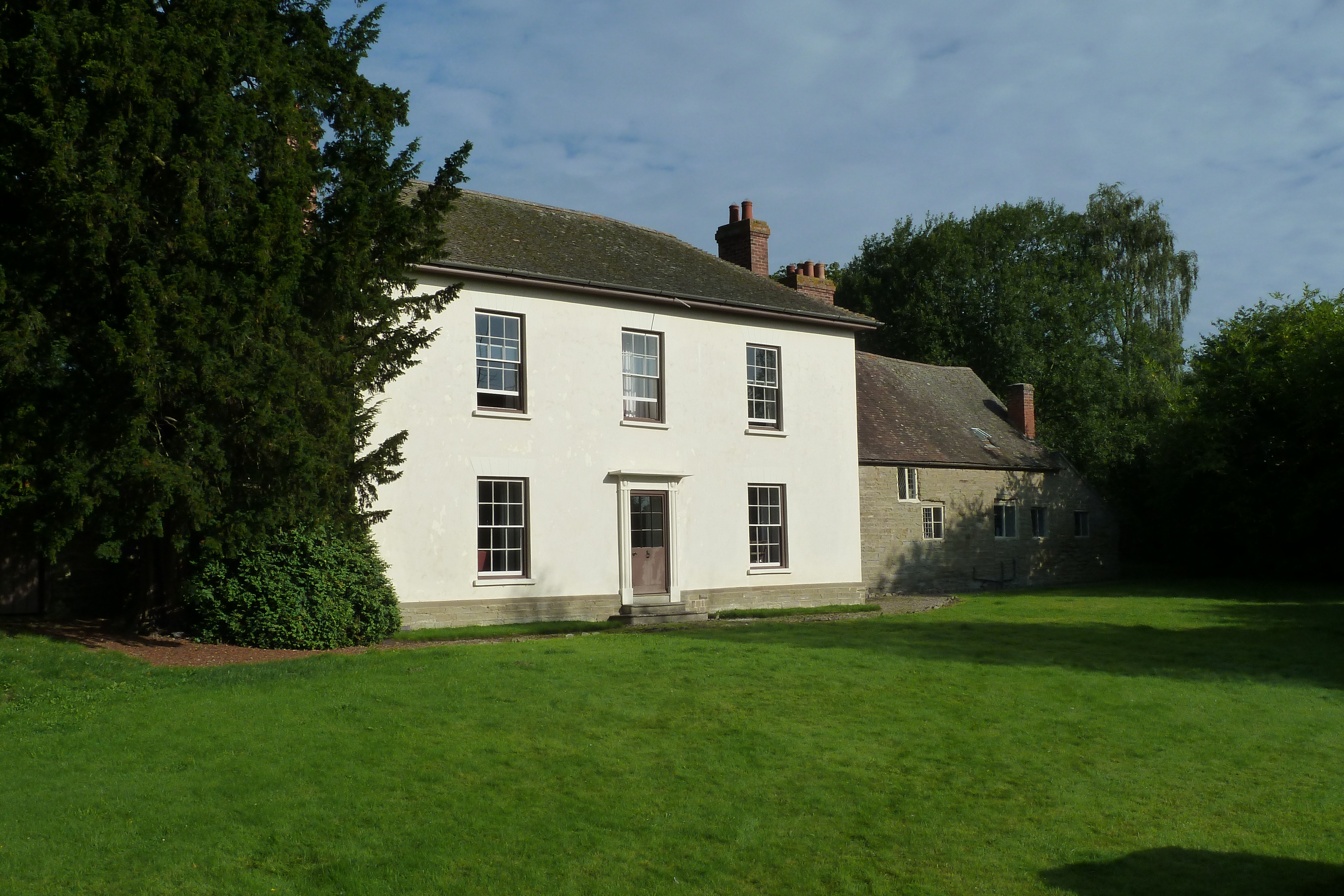
- South side; oldest part at the right
- Interactive map of the The White House area

General information
- Location: Aston Munslow, Shropshire, England
- Coordinates: 52.4765°N 2.7225°W

The White House in Aston Munslow, Shropshire, England is a medieval hall house that has undergone considerable alteration over the centuries. It is a grade II* listed building.

== Description ==
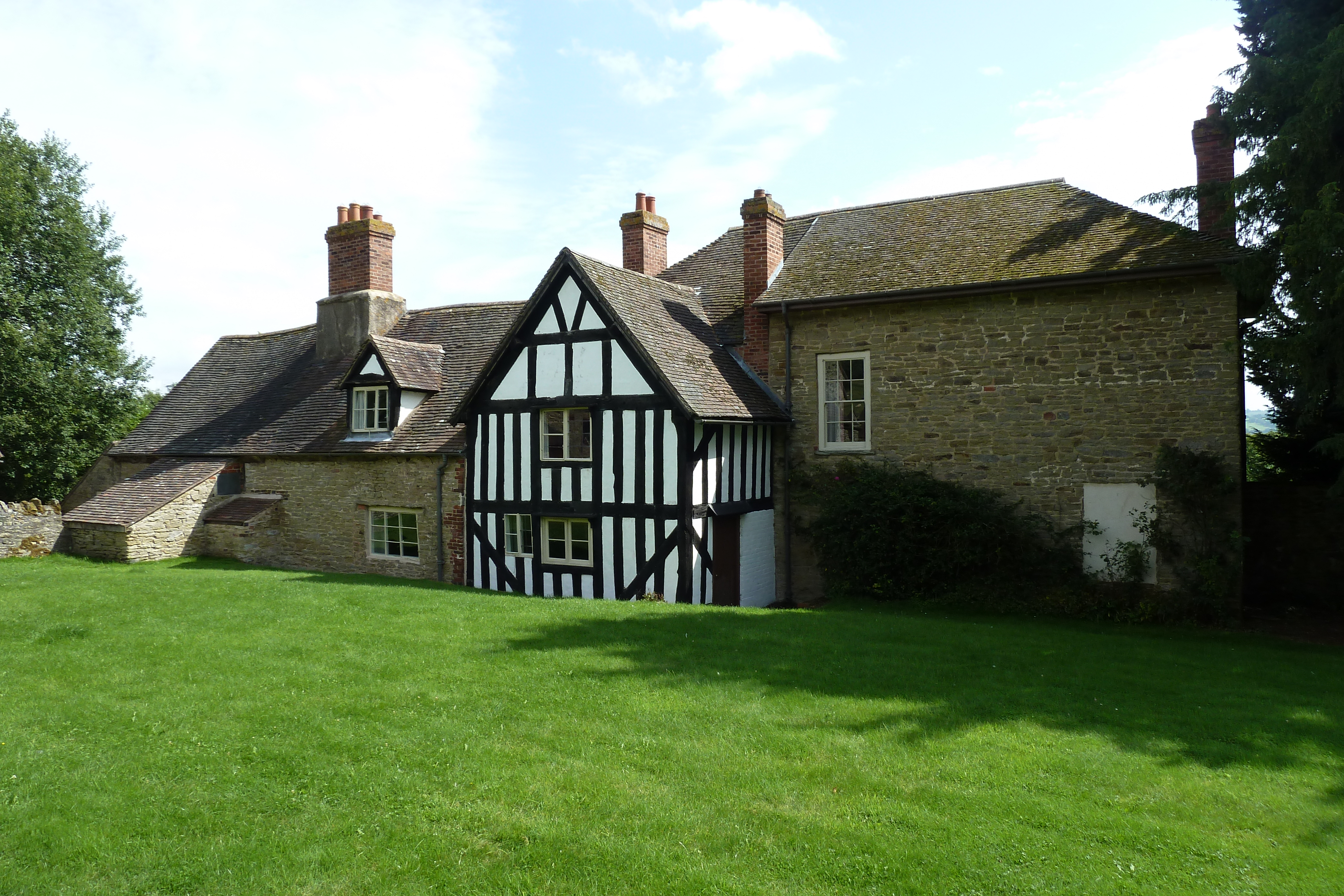
North side, showing all three periods

The exterior of the current structure reflects three periods of rebuilding.

The East end is the oldest part, dating from the 14th or 15th century. It is a hall house supported by cruck trusses. The interior was later divided by an inserted floor. The walls were originally half-timbered but later rebuilt in stone.

The central part of the current building dates from the late 16th or early 17th century. It is a box-framed structure typical of the period.

The West end was added in the late 18th century when a drawing room and bedroom were added in the Georgian style. The North facade of the building was remodelled, hiding the Elizabethan framing.

The trusses of the East end provide evidence that this was originally the cross-wing of a still older building, demolished during the Elizabethan-era alterations. It is possible that the cellars beneath the central portion date from this earlier building. This would have been the manor house of Aston Munslow.

The name, "The White House", is recorded in a conveyance dated 1694, and shows that the house was whitewashed at that period.

== Ownership ==
The house was the home of the Stedman family for some three hundred years, eventually passing by marriage to owners named Smith and then Farmer.

The house has been considered the ancestral home of campanologist Fabian Stedman, whose father, Francis, was born at Aston Munslow in 1598.

In 1947 it was sold to Walter Purser, whose daughter Miss J. C. Purser made an extensive study of the building and its history. She ran the building as a County Life Museum exhibiting agricultural and domestic implements.

In her eighties, Purser was unable to continue running the museum, and transferred the building to the Landmark Trust. The building is now maintained using income from its use as holiday accommodation.

== Dovecote ==
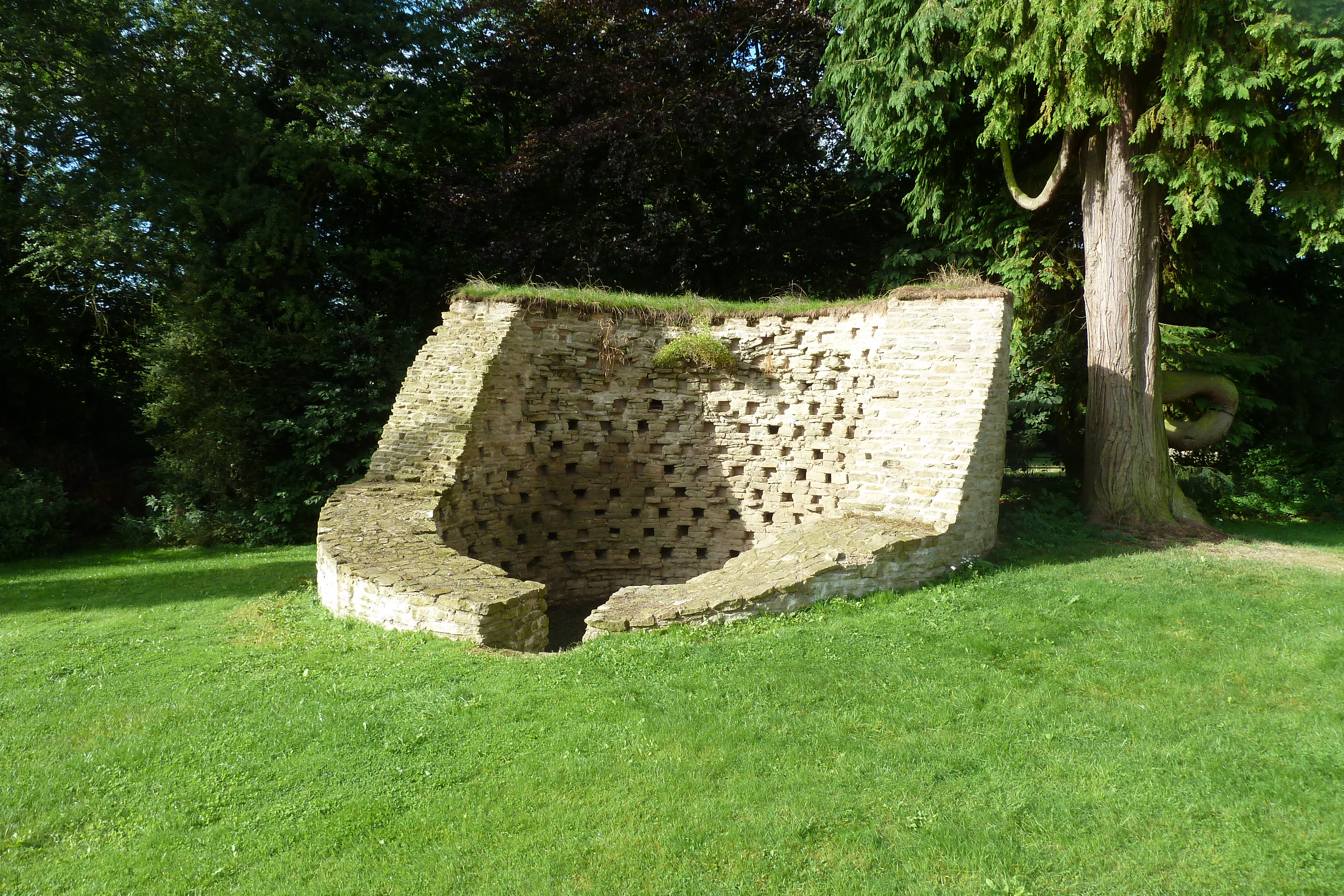
The dovecote after consolidation by the Landmark Trust

In the grounds is a scheduled ancient monument, a dovecote dating from the 14th or 15th century. Its thick circular walls enclose an area 4.8 metres (16 ft) in diameter. Within the walls, there were originally about 500 nest holes where pigeons were bred for meat. At some point before 1920 the roof fell in, "during the owner's temporary absence from the property" followed later by part of the walls.

== See also ==
- Grade II* listed buildings in Shropshire Council (H–Z)
- Listed buildings in Munslow
