= Listed buildings in Munslow =

Munslow is a civil parish in Shropshire, England. It contains 40 listed buildings that are recorded in the National Heritage List for England. Of these, one is listed at Grade I, the highest of the three grades, five are at Grade II*, the middle grade, and the others are at Grade II, the lowest grade. The parish contains villages and smaller settlements. including Aston Munslow, Beambridge, Broadstone, Hungerford, and Munslow, and the surrounding countryside. Most of the listed buildings are in the settlements, many of which are houses, cottages, farmhouses and farm buildings, the earliest of which are timber framed. The largest building is a country house, which is listed, together with associated structures and farm buildings, and there is also a mansion and a former manor house. The other listed buildings include a church with a 12th-century origin, an isolated chapel, a public house, a former mill house and mill buildings, a former smithy, and a war memorial.

== Key ==
Grade	Criteria
I	Buildings of exceptional interest, sometimes considered to be internationally important
II*	Particularly important buildings of more than special interest
II	Buildings of national importance and special interest

== Buildings ==
Name and location	Photograph	Date	Notes	Grade
St Michael's Church; 52.48526°N 2.70660°W		Early 12th century	The oldest part of the church is the nave, the tower was added later in the 12th century, the chancel in the 13th century, the aisle and the porch in the 14th century, a stage was added later to the tower, and the church was restored in 1869–70 by S. Pountney Smith. The church is built in stone, and consists of a nave with a south porch, a north aisle, a chancel with a south vestry (originally a chapel), and a west tower. The tower has four stages and a plain parapet, and the porch is timber framed with cruck construction.	I
Forester's House; 52.49959°N 2.70705°W	—	Mid to late 13th century	The house has been subsequently altered, and in about 1730 a farmhouse was built at right angles to the southeast. The original part has very think stone walls with quoins on a moulded plinth. The gable ends are timber framed with brick infill and the roof is tiled. There is a central doorway that has a round-arched head with ball flower decoration. The windows vary; some are mullioned, there are staircase slits, and later casement windows. The later house is in brick and has a hipped roof, with two storeys, three bays, a central gabled porch, and casement windows.	II*
Broadstone Chapel; 52.50405°N 2.67228°W		Medieval (probable)	The chapel, which stands in an isolated position in a field, was restored in 1843. It is built in stone with quoins, and has a tile roof. The church consists of a nave and a chancel in one cell, and there is a bellcote on the west gable. The windows are lancets, and all the openings date from the restoration.	II
The White House; 52.47650°N 2.72247°W		15th century	Originally a manor house, it was first a timber framed aisled great hall with base-cruck construction, to which a gabled two-storey cross-wing was added, probably in the late 16th century. The south half of the house was absorbed in the building of another range in the 18th century. This south range has two storeys, and elsewhere there is one storey and attics. It is rendered and has a symmetrical front of three bays, with a hipped roof, a central doorway and sash windows; elsewhere the windows are casements. To the right is the original hall, stone-clad, and at the rear is a gabled wing with exposed timber framing. Inside the original great hall is a full cruck truss.	II*
Aston Hall, wall and gate piers 52.47523°N 2.72439°W	—	16th century	Originating as a mansion, the earliest part is the rear wing, with the main part dating from about 1665. The rear wing is timber framed on a stone plinth, the main part is in stone, and the roofs are tiled. The main part has two storeys and an attic, and an E-shaped plan, with a main three-bay range, projecting cross-wings at the ends, and a central two-storey porch. Most of the windows are mullioned or mullioned and transomed, the porch has a round-arched opening, and there are gabled dormers on the left front. In front of the house is a brick garden wall and brick gate piers with stone bases and corniced caps. The gate piers are surmounted by urns, and the wall pier by an obelisk.	II*
8 and 9 Aston Munslow; 52.47561°N 2.71898°W		Late 16th century	A farmhouse that was extended in the 20th century and divided into two dwellings. The earlier part is timber framed with rendered infill, the later part is in stone, and the roof is slated. The house has one storey and attics, and a T-shaped plan, consisting of a main range and a cross-wing on the left, both parts with jettied gables, and there is a single-storey extension on the left containing a doorway. The windows are casements.	II
Lower Farm Farmhouse; 52.47486°N 2.72059°W	—	Late 16th century	The farmhouse, later a private house, has been altered and extended. The original part is timber framed with brick and rendered infill, the extensions are in brick and stone, and the roofs are tiled. It originated as a hall and cross-wing, and since have been added a parallel two-bay range with a single-bay cross-wing, and two smaller gabled wings. There are two storeys. The central gable contains a doorway with pilasters and a flat canopy on brackets, and sash windows; elsewhere the windows are casements.	II
Stable block, The White House; 52.47681°N 2.72246°W	—	Late 16th century	The stable block and barn, now used for other purposes, has a timber framed core. Its exterior is partly in stone and partly in brick on a stone plinth, with some weatherboarding and a tile roof. There are three bays, and it contains doorways, ventilation holes, and a loft opening.	II
Thonglands; 52.49735°N 2.66566°W	—	Late 16th century	A farmhouse on a moated site, the oldest part is the hall, with the cross-wing added in the 17th century, giving a T-shaped plan. The hall is timber framed and enclosed in stone, and the cross-wing has exposed timber framing with brick infill, and the roofs are tiled. There is a two-storey single-bay extension in red brick on the left, and a lean-to on the cross-wing. The farmhouse has two storeys and an attic, and the upper floor and gables are jettied with moulded bressumers. Some windows are sashes and others are casements.	II
Swan Inn Public House; 52.47539°N 2.71944°W		Late 16th or early 17th century	The public house, which has been altered and extended, is partly timber framed and partly in stone and brick, which is partly rendered, and has tile roofs. The gables have bargeboards and finials; one gable is jettied. The building is partly in two, and partly in one, storey, and has attics and cellars. The windows are casements, and inside the building are timber framed partitions.	II
Barn, Malthouse Farm; 52.50053°N 2.68056°W		Early 17th century	Originally a malthouse, later used as a farm building, it is in stone with a tile roof, hipped at the west end. There is one storey and a loft, with stone steps leading up to the loft door. On the front is a mullioned and transomed window, a doorway, and three gabled dormers. At the west end is a re-used cruck truss.	II
The Chains and outbuilding 52.48306°N 2.70385°W	—	Early 17th century	The house and attached outbuilding are in stone with a tile roof, and form a U-shaped plan. The main range of the house has one storey and an attic, and the gabled cross-wing projecting to the left has two storeys and an attic. The windows are casements, and there is a dormer with a timber framed gable. Attached to the right of the main range is an outbuilding with steps leading up to a loft door in a timber framed gable, a doorway, and an open bay on the right. At the end of this range is another gabled cross-wing with contains doors, loft doors, and thin ventilation slits.	II
Tudor Cottage; 52.47552°N 2.72059°W	—	Early 17th century	The house, which was later extended, is timber framed with brick infill on a brick plinth. The original part has a slate roof, and the roof of the extension is tiled. There are two storeys and originally two bays, with one bay added later. On the front is a slate-roofed gabled porch, the windows are casements, and in the extension is a dormer.	II
Arbour Cottages; 52.47576°N 2.72201°W		1632	Two houses, later combined into one, it is timber framed with brick and rendered infill on a stone plinth, with a stone left gable end, and a slate roof. There are two storeys, extensions with a single storey and an attic, and a central projecting dated gabled wing. The windows are casements, and there is a gabled dormer to the left of the gable, and a porch with a pentice roof.	II
The Old School House; 52.48296°N 2.70535°W	—	1658	Originally a timber framed house, it was encased or rebuilt in stone by the 18th century, converted into a school by the addition of a schoolroom in the late 19th century, and has since reverted to being a private house. The roof is tiled, there are two storeys and attics, and an L-shaped plan, consisting of a hall range, a cross-wing to the right, and a parallel wing added to this. At the rear is a stair turret and attached outbuildings. On the front are three bays, the gable of the cross-wing in the centre, the main range to the left, and the larger gable of the schoolroom to the right. The windows are mullioned or mullioned and transomed, and at the rear is a gabled porch.	II
Munslow Farmhouse; 52.48269°N 2.70477°W	—	Late 17th century	A farmhouse, later a private house, the earliest part is the right wing, with the rest of the house added in the 18th century. The right wing is in brick with a gabled tile roof, the addition is in stone with a hipped tile roof. There are two storeys and an attic, and a T-shaped plan. In the original wing are sash windows, and in the addition the windows are mullioned and transomed, those in the ground floor with segmental-arched lintels.	II
Washwell Cottage; 52.47527°N 2.72240°W Check	—	Early 18th century	The cottage, which was extended in the 19th century, is in pink sandstone with a corrugated iron roof. There are two storey, and a single-storey extension to the northwest. On the front is a gabled porch, and the windows are casements.	II
Crown Inn Public House; 52.48221°N 2.70640°W		Mid 18th century	The public house has an earlier, probably 17th-century, core, it is in brick with storey bands, painted timber frame at the ends and rear, and extensions in stone. The roofs are tiled and have coped parapeted gables. The main block has three storeys and six bays, and there are various extensions. On the front is a gabled porch, a flight of steps leading up to a doorway in the middle floor, sash windows and blocked windows with segmental heads, and to the right is a projecting gabled extension.	II
Barn, Hungerford Mill; 52.49892°N 2.68244°W		18th century	A tannery and barn, later a store, it is partly in stone and partly timber framed with weatherboarding, and has a tile roof. There are two storeys and three bays, the bays divided by stone piers. The bays are weatherboarded above, and open below. On the left is a loft door.	II
Workshop, Hungerford Mill; 52.49895°N 2.68219°W		18th century	A tannery and barn, later a workshop, it has two storeys and a tile roof. The upper storey is timber framed with weatherboarding, and the lower storey is in stone with brick piers. There are five bays, loft doors with steps leading up to them, and the lower storey is mainly open.	II
Farm buildings, Munslow Farm; 52.48298°N 2.70432°W	—	18th century	A range of farm buildings in red brick and stone with some weatherboarding, and tile roofs. They have a U-shaped plan, with a barn on the left, a curving cattle shed in the meddle and a stable range on the right. There are various openings, including doors, windows, ventilation holes, and a flight of steps leading up to a granary doorway.	II
Memorial south of the porch 52.48516°N 2.70663°W	—	Mid 18th century	The memorial in the churchyard of St Michael's Church consists of a headstone in ashlar stone. It has a carved top and a fleur-de-lys border. There is an inscription to John Child, and a later inscription on the reverse.	II
Privy and garden wall, Aston Hall; 52.47541°N 2.72419°W	—	18th century	The privy and garden wall are to the north of the hall. The wall is in stone with brick coping. The privy is in stone with a corrugated sheet roof, and a gable at the front with moulded oak bargeboards. It has a square plan, a doorway with a moulded oak frame, ogee-chamfered windows, and a rear gable with two round-arched openings. Inside is a range of three seats with hinged lids.	II
Temple, Millichope Park; 52.49071°N 2.69625°W		1770	The building is a memorial, and is built in stone with a lead domed roof. It has a cylindrical form on a circular platform, and consists of eight Ionic pilasters surrounded by eight Ionic columns carrying an entablature with a moulded dentil cornice. The doorway has pilasters, and above it is a dated plaque. Inside is a pedestal memorial.	II*
Hungerford Mill; 52.49898°N 2.68302°W		Late 18th century	Originally a millhouse, later a farmhouse, and then converted into flats, it is in stone with quoins, a band, and a hipped tile roof. There are three storeys and three bays, the central bay projecting and containing a canted porch with pilasters and an entablature, and a doorway with a radial fanlight. Above the porch is a Venetian window, the other windows on the front are sashes, and on the two-bay right return they are casements, those in the middle floor with segmental heads.	II
Outbuilding, Hungerford Mill; 52.49893°N 2.68273°W		Late 18th century	Probably originally a mill, later used as a store, it is in stone with a tile roof. There are two storeys, two bays, and a lean-to extension to the left. It has doorways in the ground floor, openings above and in the extension, all with segmental-arched lintels.	II
Memorial south of the nave 52.48520°N 2.70644°W	—	Late 18th century	The memorial in the churchyard of St Michael's Church consists of a raised slab tomb in ashlar stone on a brick plinth. It consists of an inscribed slab with moulded edges, and commemorates a former rector of the parish.	II
Munslow House; 52.48526°N 2.70728°W	—	Late 18th century	A rectory, later a private house, it was altered in the 19th century. The house is in stone with a brick rear wing and a hipped slate roof. There are three storeys, and three bays, the middle bay projecting slightly. On the front is a portico with two pairs of Ionic columns, an entablature and a pediment, and a doorway with pilasters, a radial fanlight, and an open pediment. On the front the windows are sashes that have lintels with keystones. Elsewhere are round-headed windows with Gothick tracery, and a two-storey canted bay window.	II
Smithy; 52.48994°N 2.69123°W	—	18th or early 19th century	The smithy, later used as a store, is in stone with tile roofs, hipped at the rear. It has one storey and an L-shaped plan, with two parallel ranges. On the front facing the road are two gables, each containing a wooden window with a pointed arch and containing Gothick tracery. Elsewhere there are doorways and windows with segmental-arched lintels.	II
Outbuildings, Swan Inn; 52.47549°N 2.71967°W	—	18th or early 19th century	Originally stables, the building is in stone and has a tile roof. There is one storey and a loft, and a T-shaped plan consisting of a two-bay range and a cross-wing. Most of the openings have segmental heads.	II
Miller House; 52.48370°N 2.70536°W	—	Early 19th century	The house is in stone with corbelled eaves and a hipped roof, partly tiled and partly slated. There are two storeys, attics and a basement, the south front has three bays, with a single-storey extension to the right, and a rear extension. The central doorway has pilasters, a semicircular fanlight, and an open pediment. The windows on the front are sashes, and at the rear are multi-paned windows and flat-roofed dormers.	II
Rushbury Lodge; 52.49757°N 2.69760°W		Early 19th century	The lodge is at the entry to the north drive of Millichope Park. It is in stone with pilasters and a band forming an entablature. The roof is tiled with gable verges and linking cornices forming pediments. There is one storey and an attic, and a T-shaped plan, consisting of a range and a cross-wing, and there is a lean-to extension. A portico is formed by pairs of pilasters on front of the doorway. The windows are mullioned and transomed.	II
Millichope Park and terrace balustrade 52.49064°N 2.69870°W		1835–40	A country house designed by Edward Haycock, it is built in Grinshill sandstone with corner pilasters, a corniced parapet, and a hipped slate roofs behind a balustrade. There are two storeys, and a basement. The east front has five bays, the middle three bays slightly projecting that has a pedimented portico with six fluted Ionic columns. The portico is raised on a terrace and is flanked by balustrading. The original entrance is below the portico, and has two short Tuscan columns. The windows are sashes, some with moulded hoods on brackets.	II*
1, 2 and 3 Estate Yard Cottages, Beambridge Clubroom and 61 Upper Millichope; 52.49165°N 2.69425°W	—	c. 1836	Part of an estate village, these are two ranges consisting of four houses, a store and a hall, forming an L-shaped plan. They are in stone with tile roofs, and two storeys. In the centre is a pedimented gable and a segmental-headed archway. The windows are casements.	II
Barn, Estate Yard Cottages; 52.49156°N 2.69379°W	—	c. 1836	The barn is part of an estate village, and is in stone with a tile roof. There are pilasters on the northeast side, and gable heads with weatherboarding.	II
Cartshed, Estate Yard Cottages; 52.49167°N 2.69403°W	—	Early 19th century	The cartshed is part of an estate village, and is in stone with a tile roof. It has a rectangular plan, one storey and four bays. It contains doorways, one bay is open, and there is a brick segmental-arched opening in the right gable end.	II
Dovecote, Estate Yard Cottages; 52.49126°N 2.69389°W	—	c. 1836	The dovecote is part of an estate village, and is in stone with a hipped tile roof. It has a square plan, and on three sides pilasters divide them into three recessed panels containing doorways and loft doors with segmental-arched lintels. On the fourth side is a lean-to with a gabled pediment containing a roundel in the tympanum. On the top is a cupola with pedimented faces each containing three slits.	II
Keepers Cottage; 52.49126°N 2.69420°W	—	c. 1836	A house and store, part of an estate village, in stone with pilasters, a band forming an entablature, a series of gabled pediments, and a tile roof. There are two storeys, a lean-to porch, casement windows, dormers and half-dormers.	II
The Bakery; 52.48322°N 2.70369°W	—	Mid 19th century	A brick house, rendered on the side, with a tile roof, and two gables facing the road. There are two storeys and an attic, the windows are casements with hood moulds, and the doorway has a plain surround. There is a two-storey extension to the left.	II
War memorial 52.48300°N 2.70495°W		c. 1919	The war memorial stands at a road junction and is in granite. It consists of a cross finial on a tapering shaft. This is on a square plinth with chamfered corners, on two steps, the upper square, the lower polygonal. The plinth carries inscriptions and the names of those lost in the two World Wars. The memorial is on a circular podium approached by steps at the sides, and in front of it is a wall that is bowed in the centre.	II
