= Bishop's Castle Town Hall =

Municipal building in Bishop's Castle, Shropshire, England

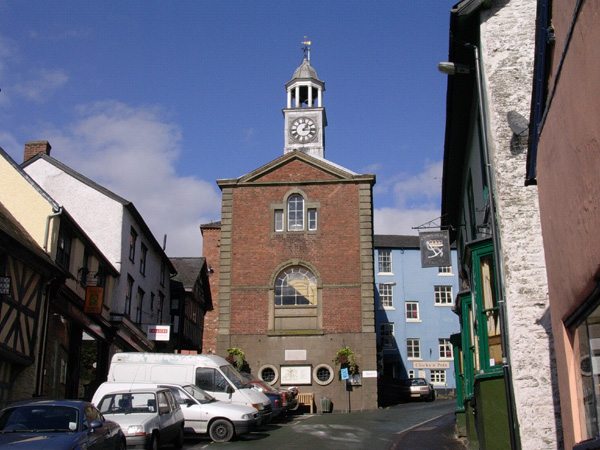
- Bishop's Castle Town Hall

- Shown in Shropshire
- 52.4943°N 2.9980°W
- Location: High Street, Bishop's Castle

History
- Built: 1750

Site notes
- Architect: William Baker
- Architectural style: Neoclassical style

Listed Building – Grade II*
- Official name: The Town Hall
- Designated: 28 July 1950
- Reference no.: 1054552

Bishop's Castle Town Hall is a municipal building in the High Street in Bishop's Castle, Shropshire, England. The building, which is the meeting place of Bishop's Castle Town Council, is a Grade II* listed building.

== History ==
The first municipal building in the town was a medieval town hall at the top of the High Street, in existence in the 16th century. It had two large windows and a clock tower with a bell and it was equipped with a lock-up for petty criminals. In August 1745, the burgesses decided to demolish the old building and to erect a new structure on the same site. The new building was designed by William Baker of Audlem (1705–1771) in the neoclassical style, built in red brick with stone dressings and was completed in around 1750.

The design involved a symmetrical main frontage with a single bay facing south down the High Street; the basement, which was rusticated, featured two oculi; on the ground floor there was a large round headed opening with an architrave and a keystone and, on the first floor, there was a Venetian window. The corners were decorated with quoins and the whole structure was surmounted by a pediment. The building stretched back five bays and the side elevations were characterised by round headed openings on the ground floor and sash windows on the first floor. At roof level, there was a two-stage wooden cupola with clock faces in the first stage and an octagonal belfry with Doric order columns in the second stage, all surmounted by an ogee-shaped dome and a weather vane. Internally, the principal rooms were the main hall on the ground floor and the courtroom, which was also used as a council chamber, and the town clerk's office on the first floor. There was a lock-up for petty criminals in the basement, which by the early 19th century was a "damp, cold place".

Bishop's Castle had a very small electorate and was represented in parliament by two of the burgesses, which meant it was recognised by the UK Parliament as a rotten borough. Its right to elect members of parliament was removed by the Reform Act 1832 and the borough council, which continued to meet in the town hall, was reformed under the Municipal Corporations Act 1883. In 1864 the clock tower was renewed and a new clock installed; the clock (by Simmonds of Warwick, dated 1860) remains in service and strikes the hours and quarters on two bells in the belfry. During the First World War, the flag on the town hall was flown at half-mast after Lieutenant Alfred Garnett-Botfield, who was born locally, died while serving with the South Wales Borderers at the Battle of Festubert in May 1915.

The town hall continued to serve as the headquarters of the borough throughout the first half of the 20th century but ceased be the local seat of government when the enlarged Clun and Bishop's Castle Rural District Council was formed in 1967. Following local government reform in 1974, the building became the offices and meeting place of Bishop's Castle Town Council. After the competition of a major programme of refurbishment works, carried out with support from the Heritage Lottery Fund, the building was re-opened in June 2014.

== See also ==
- Grade II* listed buildings in Shropshire Council (H–Z)
