= 55–56 High Street, Much Wenlock =

Building in Much Wenlock, Shropshire, England

55–56 High Street
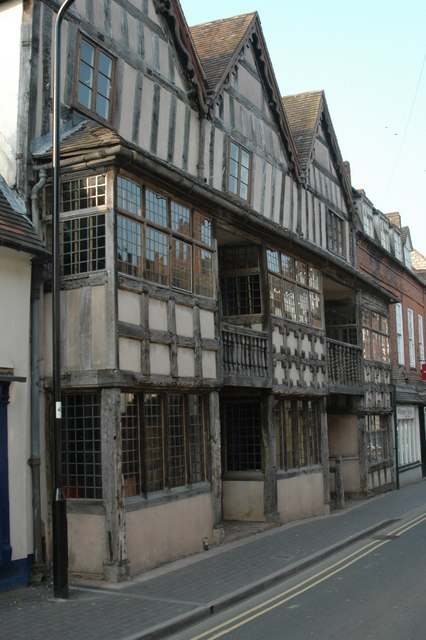
- The building in 2007

- Location within Shropshire 55–56 High Street, Much Wenlock (England)

General information
- Location: 55–56 High Street, Much Wenlock, Shropshire, England
- Coordinates: 52.5954°N 2.55831°W
- Completed: Early 15th century

Technical details
- Floor count: 3

55–56 High Street is a historic building in Much Wenlock, Shropshire, England. The property dates to the early 15th century, and is now a Grade II* listed building.

Previously known as Raynald's Mansion, and since divided into two dwellings, it originated as a hall house, with the front added in the 17th century. The building is timber framed with plaster infill and some brick, and it has a tile roof. There are three storeys and three bays. Each bay contains a square two-storey bay window. Between the bays, in the middle floor are balconies, and in the ground floor are small 19th-century shop fronts. All the windows are 19th-century casements. In the top floor are three gables with carved bargeboards.

== See also ==
- Listed buildings in Much Wenlock

== Sources ==
- Historic England, "Nos. 55 and 56 High Street, Much Wenlock (1053825)", National Heritage List for England
- Newman, John; Pevsner, Nikolaus (2006), Shropshire, The Buildings of England, New Haven and London: Yale University Press, ISBN 0-300-12083-4
