= King's Head, Shrewsbury =

The King's Head, Shrewsbury
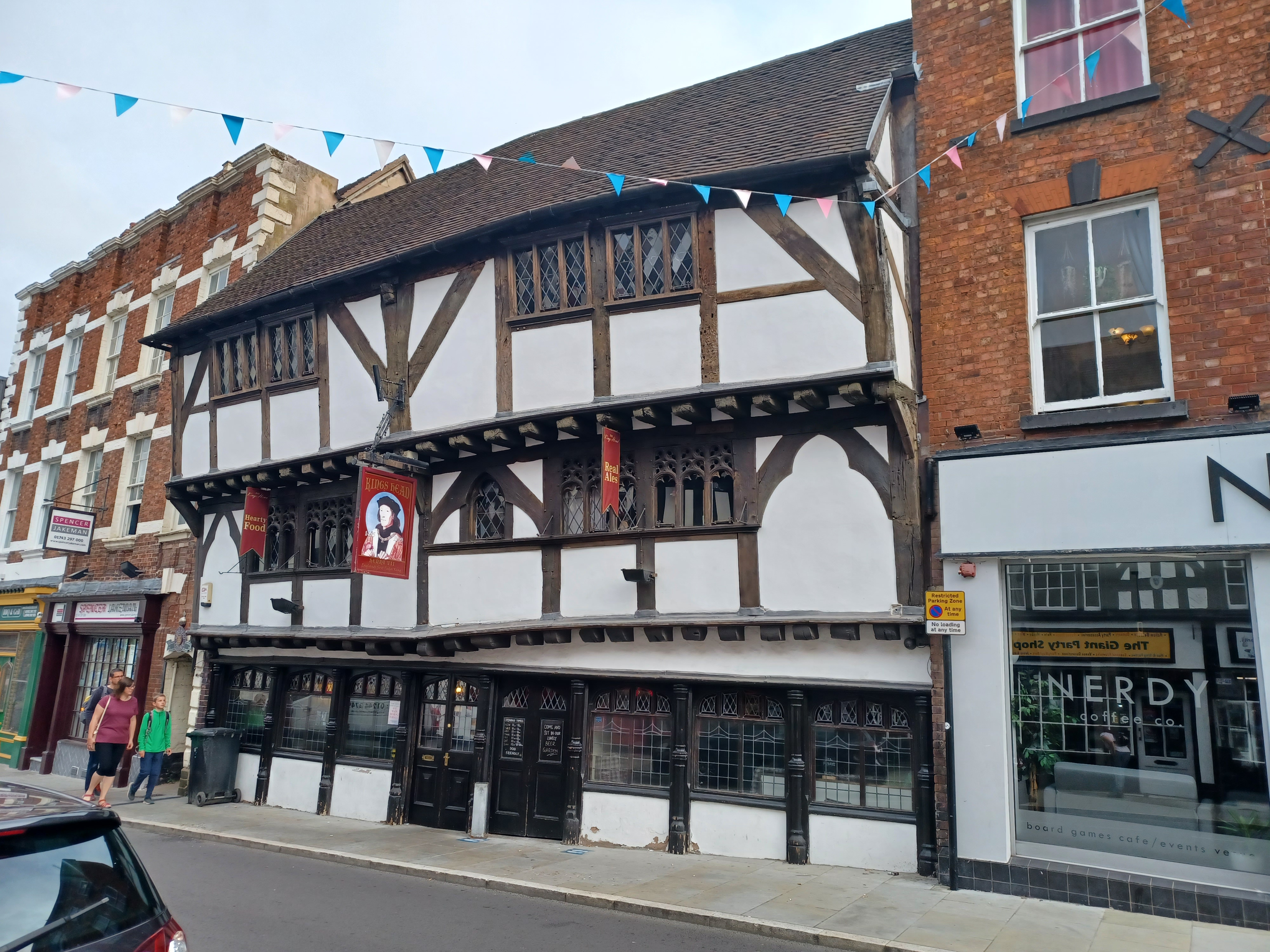
- The King's Head in 2021

- Location within Shropshire
- 52°42′34″N 2°45′23″W
- Location: Mardol, Shrewsbury, Shropshire

History
- Built: Late 15th century

Listed Building – Grade II*
- Official name: The King's Head Public House
- Designated: 10 Janueary 1953
- Reference no.: 1270680

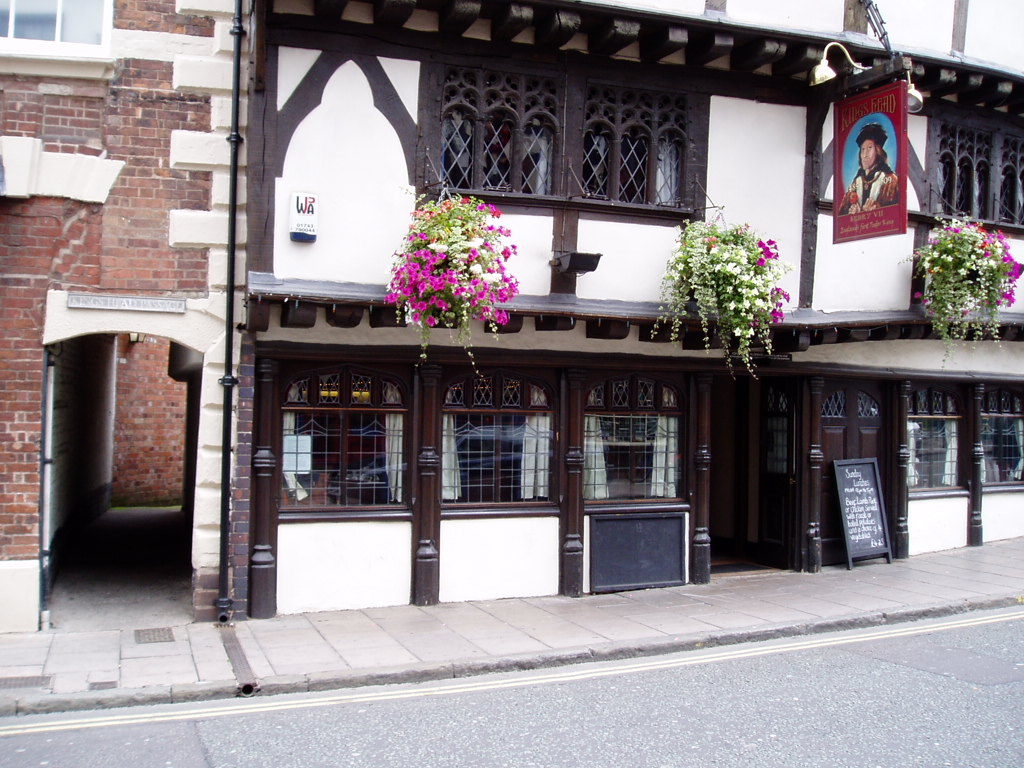
King's Head Passage (left) and the public house (right)

The King's Head is an old public house on the historic street Mardol in Shrewsbury, Shropshire, England. It was previously known as the "Last Inn" as it was the last inn in Shrewsbury on the route out of town towards Wales (Frankwell historically was a separate entity, outside the borough of Shrewsbury). It is a Grade II* listed building.

There is a passage that runs down the side of the pub, called the King's Head Passage, connecting Smithfield Road with Mardol. A defensive ditch can still be seen when walking down this passage, as the route of the passage has not altered and has not been improved for centuries. When the area floods (due to the nearby River Severn) the ditch fills in with water and can more clearly be seen, often rendering the path unusable.

It is a timber-framed building and was listed on 10 January 1953. Also nearby are other passages – Phoenix Place, Carnarvon Lane and Mardol Gardens – which all form part of the historical landscape of this part of Shrewsbury.

It has been dated by dendrochronology to 1404. It became known as the "King's Head" some time between 1780 and 1820 and was previously known as the "Last Inn". Wall paintings discovered by chance during renovation work show the Last Supper and date to 1500.

== See also ==
- St George's Bridge (the bridge which connected Mardol to Frankwell in medieval times).
- Listed buildings in Shrewsbury (northwest central area)
