= Hawkstone Abbey Farmhouse =

Building in England

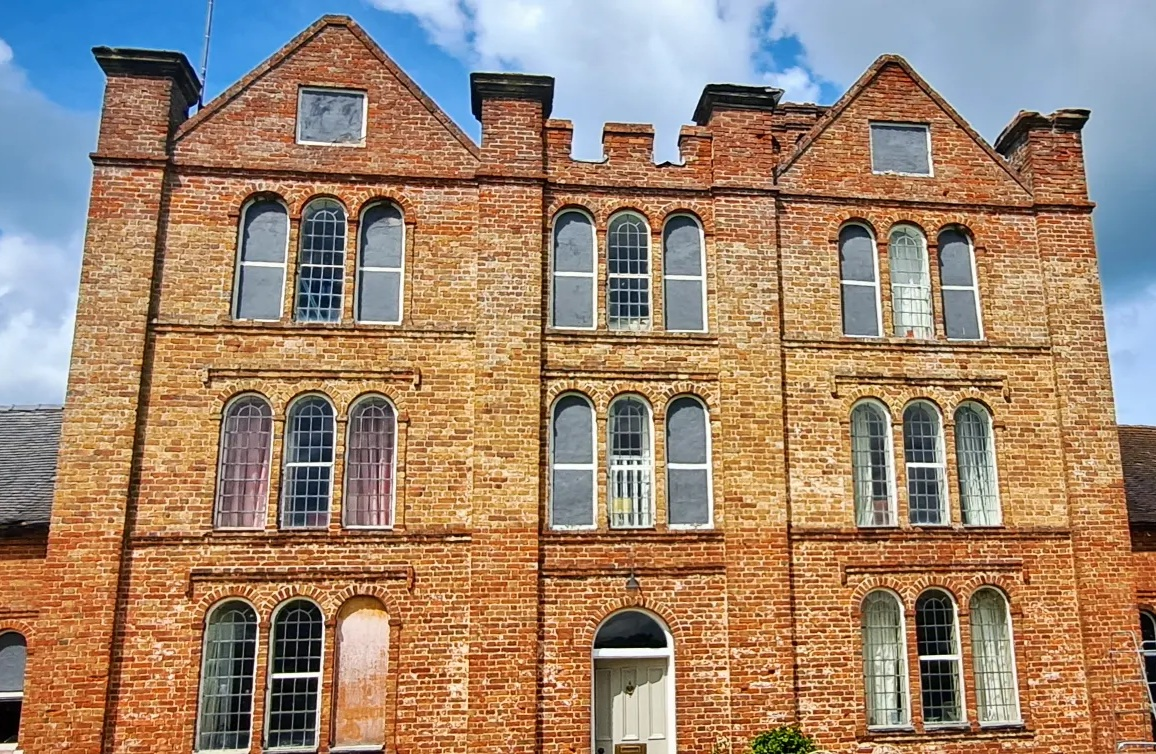
- Hawkstone Abbey Farmhouse

- Location within Shropshire
- Alternative names: Abbey Farm

General information
- Location: near Wem, Shrewsbury, Shropshire, England
- Coordinates: 52.8721°N 2.63151°W
- Elevation: 125 m (410 ft)

Hawkstone Abbey Farmhouse is a Grade II* listed building in Shropshire. It is a mid-eighteenth-century building with additions made in the first half of the nineteenth century.
