= Golden Cross, Shrewsbury =

Oldest licensed pub in Shrewsbury

Coordinates: 52.7067°N 2.7531°W

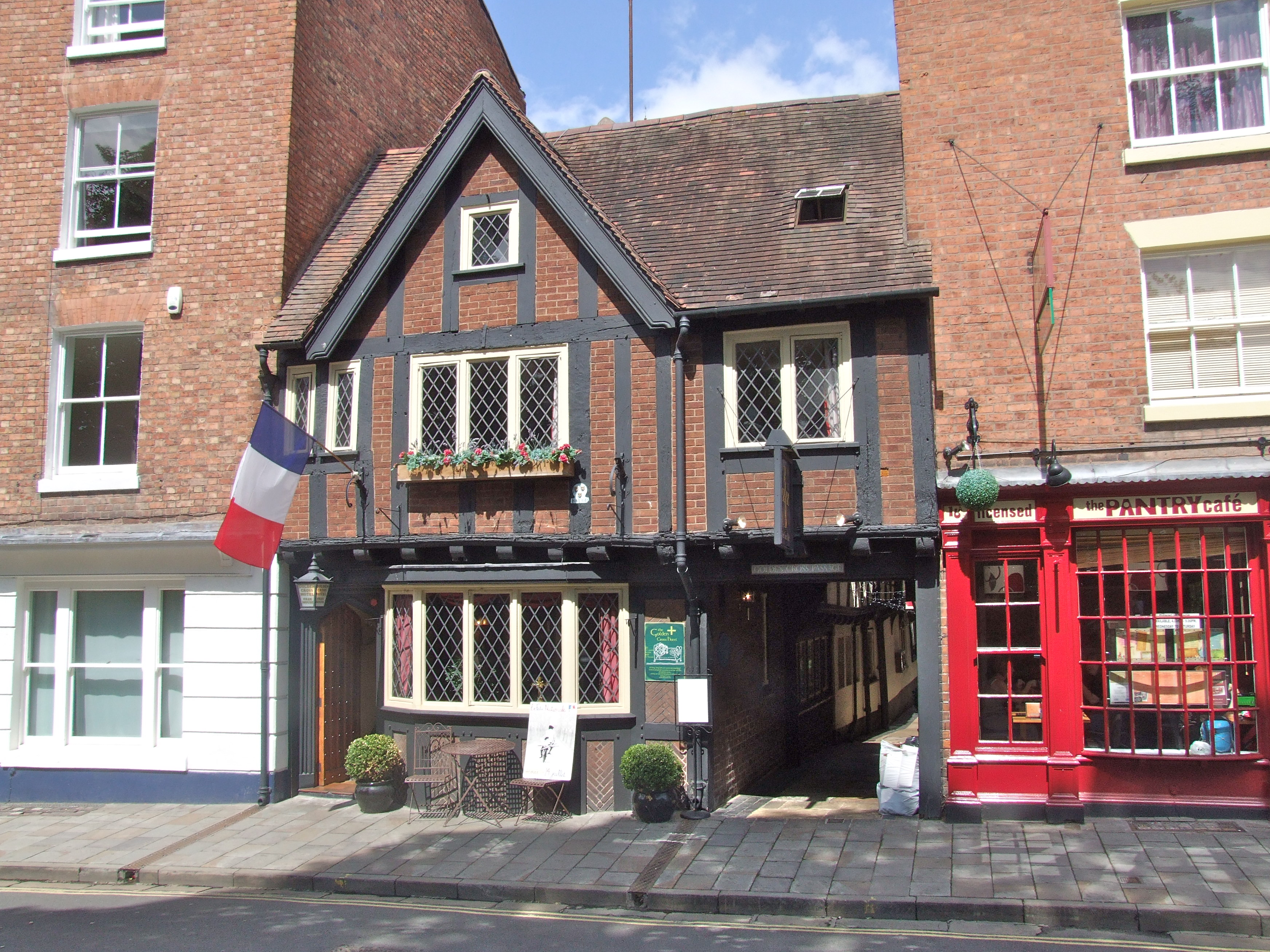
Golden Cross frontage on Princess Street; the passage named after it – which is a public footpath – starts in its right corner.

The Golden Cross is a public house in Shrewsbury, England; it is reputed to be the oldest licensed pub in Shrewsbury.

== Architecture ==
The building is grade II* listed. The first floor is jettied with moulded bressumer and close studding.

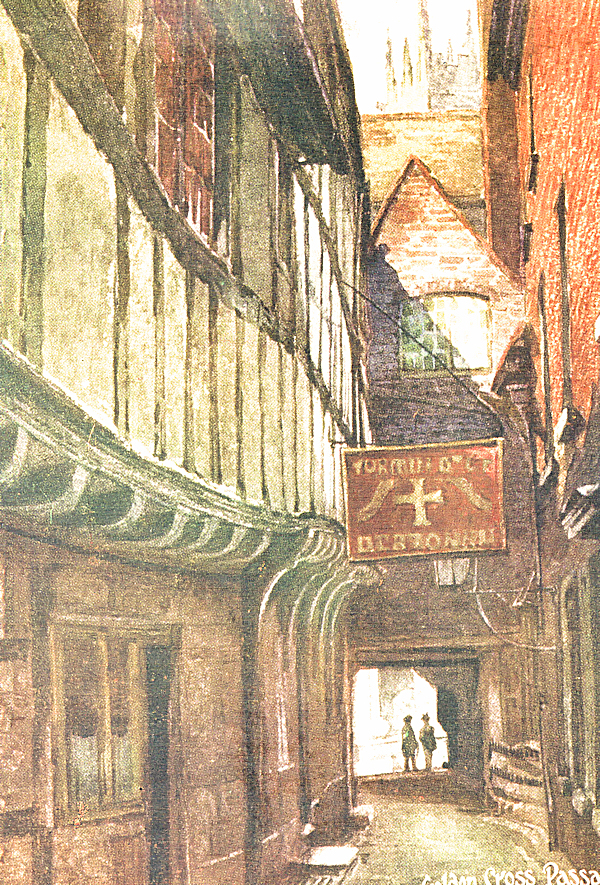
The Golden Cross is reputed to be the oldest licensed public house in Shrewsbury and records show that it was used as an inn as far back as 1428, some years before the introduction of formal licensing.

== History ==
=== 1400–1600 ===
Records show that the Golden Cross was used as an inn as far back as 1428, some years before the introduction of formal licensing. Its original name was the Sextry, and it is said to have been the sacristy of Old St. Chad's Church, the ruins of which can still be seen over the road in Princess Street.

The sacristy was where the church plate and vestments were kept, and it also provided lodgings for a church officer known as the sacristan. Similarly, the original name of Golden Cross Passage was Sextry Shut, site of the lodgings for the Vicars Choral of St. Chad's. In 1933, a couple of timber-framed archways were discovered which a local archaeologist dated back to the time of Henry III (1216–1272), but these had apparently been covered by a later building which some unknown authority has assigned to 1428.

The Sacristy was connected to the church by a covered passageway, probably to provide shelter for the Vicars Choral as they processed to their midnight offices in the church. The passageway was subsequently demolished, and the present Princess Street now cuts across its path. Although alterations have occurred over the years, much of the building dates back to the last quarter of the fifteenth century.

The earliest surviving record for the inn is a Bailiffs' Account for 1495, which shows that the sum of 13s.2d was spent on "The King's gentlemen in sextre at the comyng home of Mr Prynce from London". It is not certain who the important "Mr Prynce" was, but there may be a connection between him and the name "Princess Street", as earlier spellings of the name give it as "Princes Street".

=== 1600–1800 ===
The first known licensee of the inn appears in 1619, when the Bailiffs' Account mentions a lawsuit between John Cleve of the Sextry and his father-in-law John Price of the Pheasant in Mardol, another part of Shrewsbury town centre.

During the Civil War a group of Royalists from the town regularly met there and were described by one of their number as " a club of good fellowship," while a member of the opposite persuasion referred to them as "a knot of company seekers."

The inn was first recorded as "The Golden Cross" in 1780 and it has been a popular meeting place throughout its history. In 1796, as part of his inaugural election as M.P. for Shrewsbury, corrupt Tory candidate William Hill bought votes from the local freemen by plying them liberally with food and drink at the Golden Cross.

=== 1800–present ===
In the 19th century the landlord was Thomas Harris. He was particularly proud of his dinners provided daily "for those who wished to be served at his house or at their own houses." This may have been the town's first takeaway service. He also sold fresh poultry ready for dressing and prime sausages in season.

In 1900 the inn was owned by Worthington & Co. and had six private and four public rooms. The landlady at this time was Maria Seddon, who later changed her name to Banning. She was obliged to sell the brewery's beer and stout, but she could supply her own spirits.

In February 1962 Michael and Audrey O'Dwyer became tenants of the inn. Michael was a retired National Hunt jockey and the couple were popular hosts, remaining at the inn for many years. Within a few months of their tenancy a problem arose when a section of the public wanted an end to the "Men Only" bar, which had been a longstanding tradition. When local residents heard that their sanctuary was to lose its status, 70 male customers signed a petition of protest, which was sent to the brewery by the landlord. A compromise was reached with the "Men Only" bar functioning on weekdays, but with the ladies being allowed in at weekends, a situation that continued for a number of years.

At that time, to the rear of the building, was what was traditionally known as the "Monks' Hole." In this area were two medieval stone benches and a stone table together with a spiral stone staircase which descended into a tunnel. This was one of three tunnels which emerged in three arches within the purlieu of old St. Chad's. One came from what is now Rackham's store, further down High Street and the other from the other direction.

The Golden Cross tunnel emerged in the centre arch of the three and had reputedly allowed monks to cross from St. Chad's to drink in privacy, without being spotted by public. During the 1960s Mr O'Dwyer was persistently bothered by curious tourists wanting to explore the underground passage. However, once he decided to charge a shilling per visit, numbers dwindled until such time as he was able to seal the entrance to the tunnel and store his dustbins in the area. During the refurbishments of the late 1970s the entrance to the tunnel was demolished.
