= Hughley =

Hughley may refer to:

- Hughley, Shropshire, a village and civil parish in Shropshire, UK
- The Hughleys, an American sitcom

== Surname ==
- D. L. Hughley (b. 1963), an American actor
- George Hughley (1939–1999), an American football fullback
- Ella J. Bradley-Hughley (1889–1918), an American operatic soprano soloist and choir director.
