= The Lack, Brompton =

The Lack
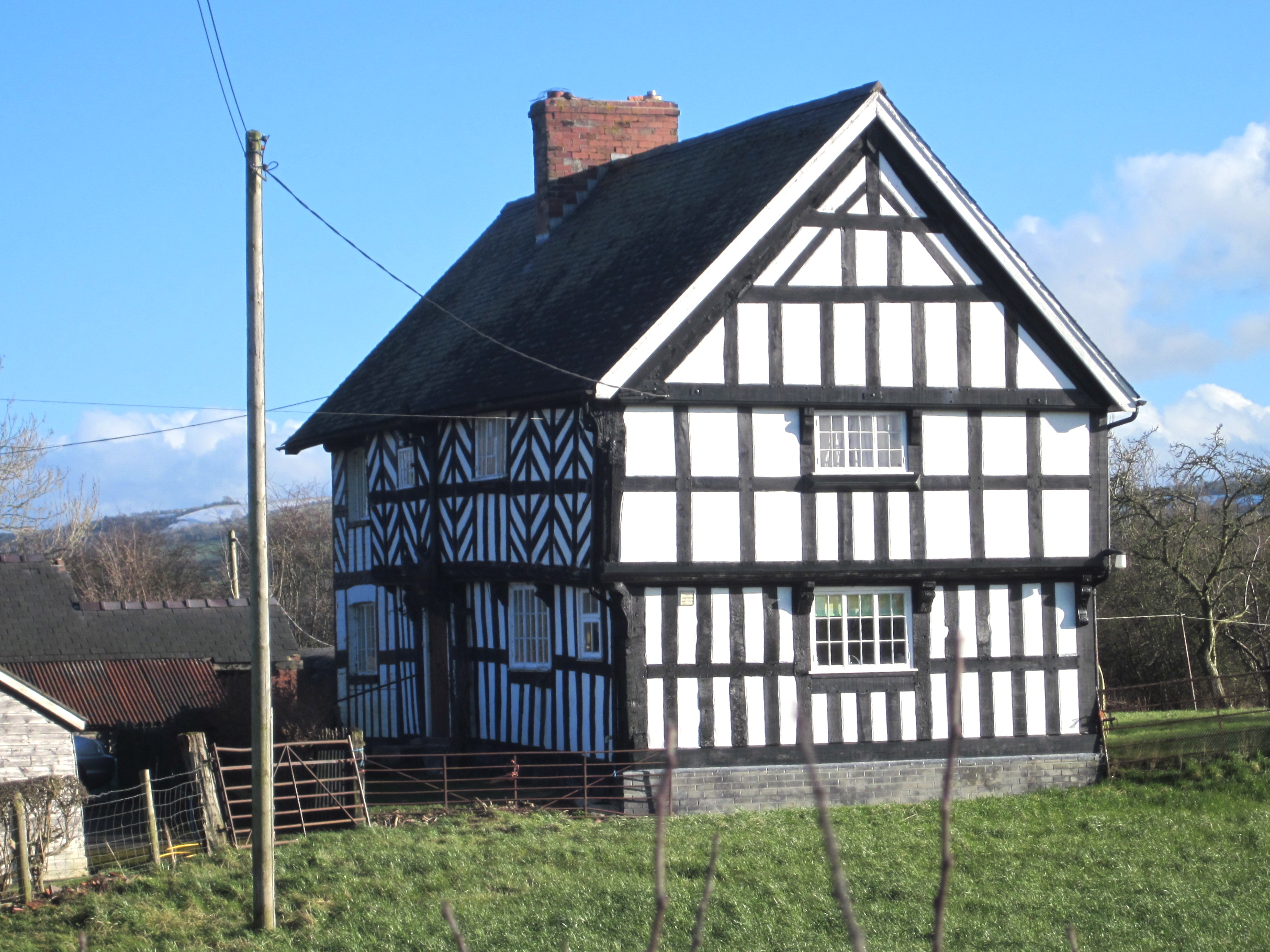
- The Lack, Brompton/Churchstoke

- Location in Shropshire
- 52.5376°N 3.0848°W
- OS grid reference: SO2651693860

History
- Built: Late 16th Century. Timber-framed Severn Valley

Site notes
- Architectural style: Timber framed house with 20th century additions

Listed Building – Grade II*
- Type: English Heritage
- Designated: 1 December 1951
- Reference no.: 1054410

The Lack is a Grade II* listed building, formerly in the historic parish of Churchstoke but now in the parish of Chirbury with Brompton in Shropshire. It is likely to have been built in the latter part of the 16th century.

== Architectural description ==
The Lack is a farmhouse dating from the later part of the 16th century with later additions and alterations. It is timber framed with plaster and painted brick infill and a slate roof. It has a lobby-entrance of "Severn Valley" type with the doorway leading into a lobby set against the centrally placed chimney stack. The house consists of four framed bays, with one to the left of the entrance. It is two storied house of transitional or "sub-medieval" form with a jettied first floor with a richly moulded bressumer supported on decorated carved brackets.

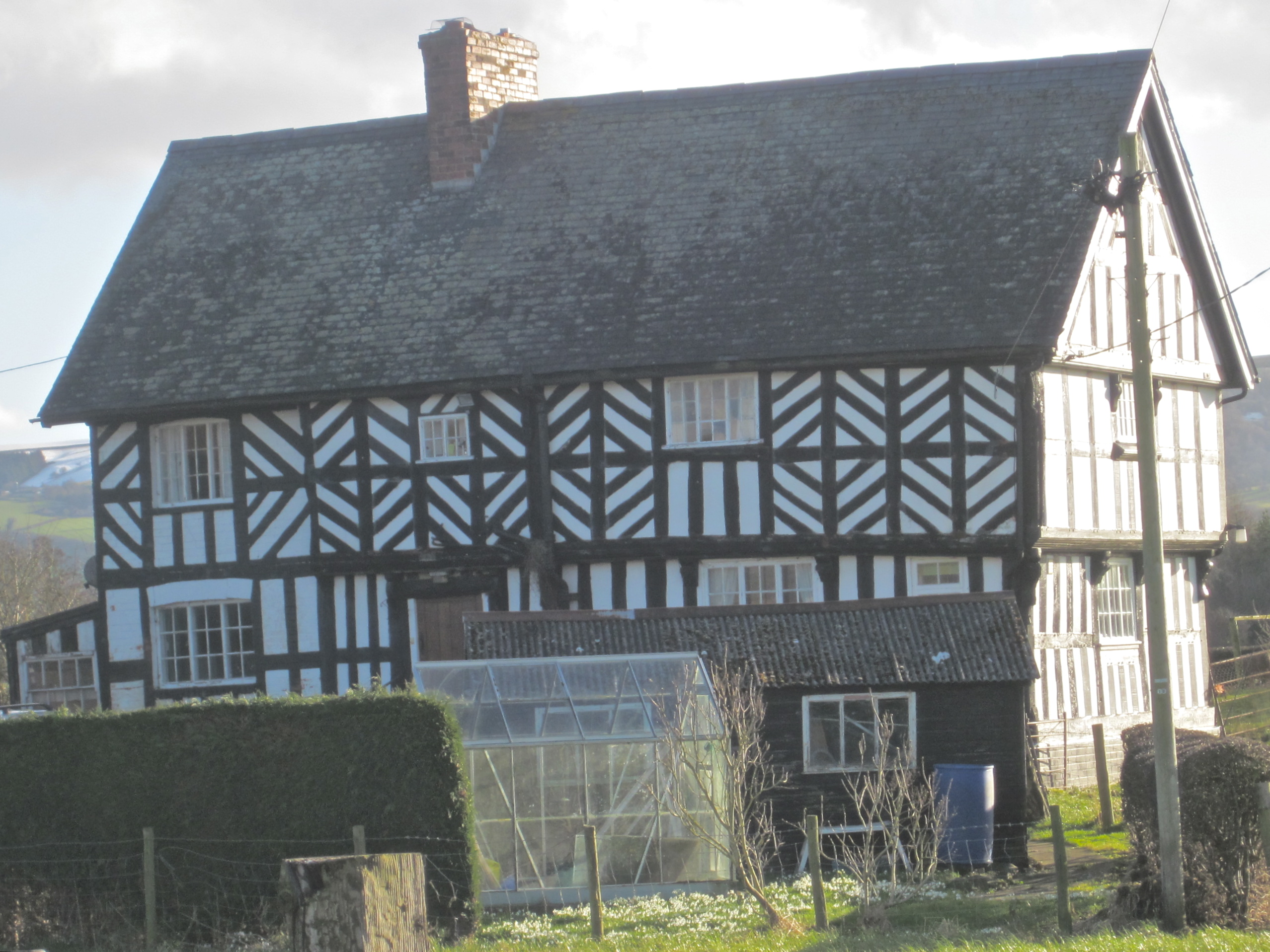
The Lack, Brompton/Churchstoke

The timber-framing of the house is close-studded with vertical posts to the ground. The upper floor has herringbone/lozenge decoration to front; there is a jetty also on the second floor to right gable end, and small square panels to the rear on the first floor; the ground floor is under-built in brick. The left bay is in 19th-century brick, now painted black and white in imitation of timber frame.

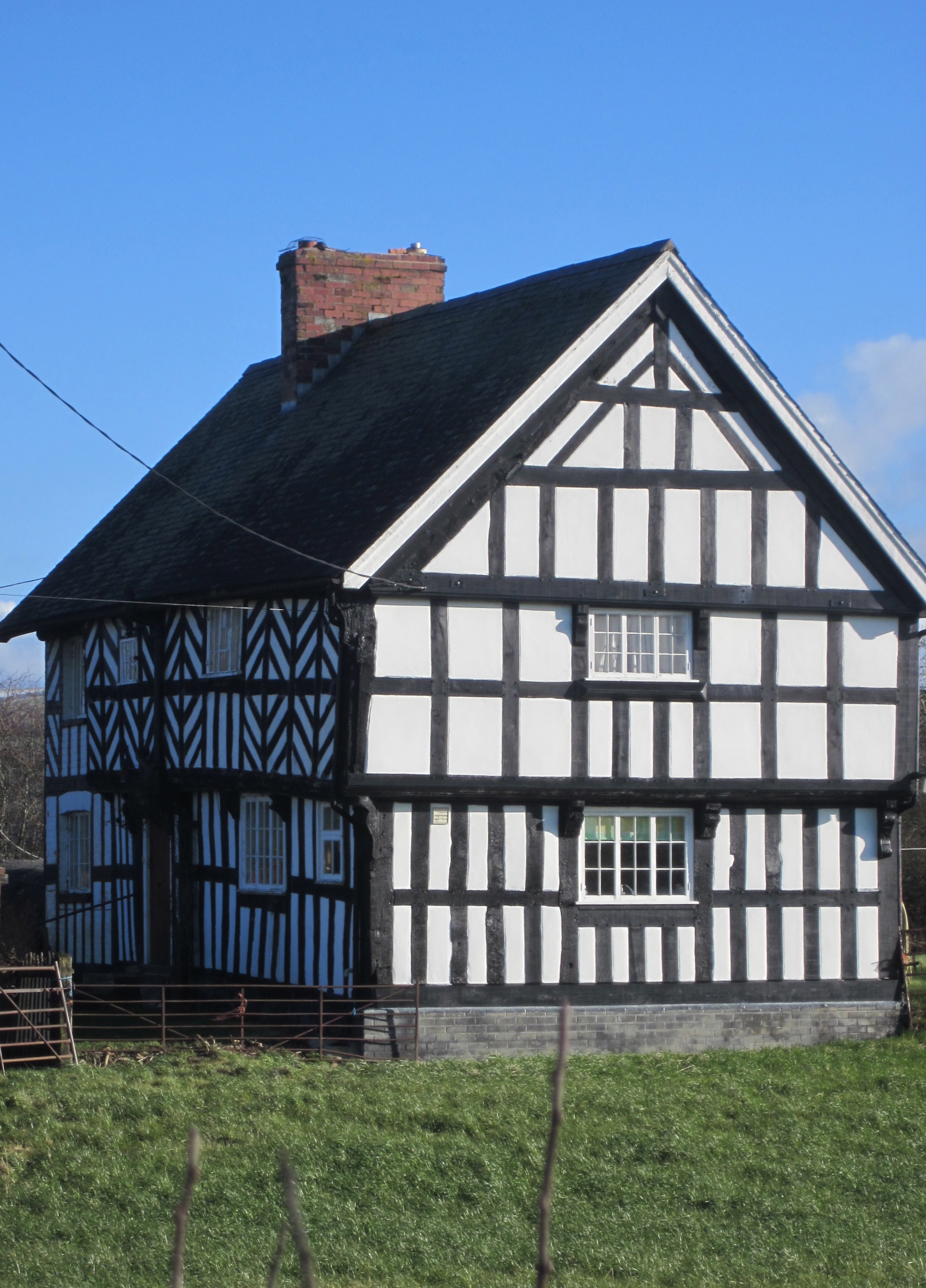
The Lack, Brompton/Churchstoke

The windows are late 19th-century casements; the first-floor window of the right gable end has a moulded wooden cill of an earlier window. The brick addition has a segmental-headed casement. The interior has been considerably altered in the early 20th century, with a new staircase and fireplaces but retains chamfered cross-beam ceiling with ogee stops to right ground-floor room.

== Comparisons ==
An immediate comparison to The Lack is Glas Hirfryn in Llansilin on the Denbighshire/Montgomeryshire border. This has identically patterned herringbone timbers on the upper storey and similar close studding to the ground floor. It is similarly jettied with decorative brackets supporting the bressumer. Glas Hirfryn has been dated by dendrochronology to 1559 or shortly afterwards. The use of similar decorative brackets to support a bressumer can also be seen on the much larger Trewern Hall in Montgomeryshire.

== Bibliography ==
- Newman, J.; Pevsner, N. (2006). Shropshire. Buildings of England. p. 174.
