= Millichope Park =

Country house in Munslow, Shropshire, England

Coordinates: 52°29′27″N 2°41′56″W

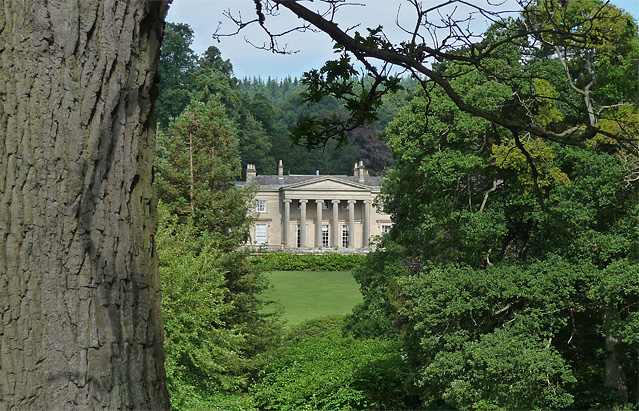
Millichope Park House

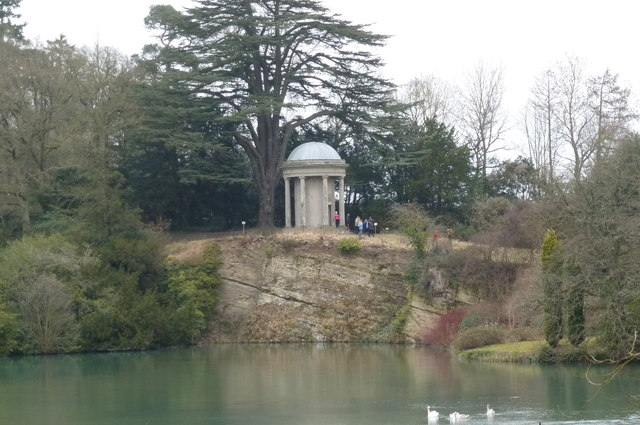
Garden temple

Millichope Park is a 19th-century country house in Munslow, Shropshire, England, some 5 miles (8 km) south-east of Church Stretton.

The house was built in the Greek Revival style between 1835 and 1840 by architect Edward Haycock of Shrewsbury for Revd. Norgrave Pemberton, Rector of Church Stretton. Constructed of ashlar to a rectangular plan, it is a two-storey building with a five window frontage. The entrance is a pedimented portico supported by six Ionic pillars. The house is Grade II* listed and stands in 90 hectares (220 acres) of landscaped parkland.

A memorial temple within the grounds is also Grade II* listed. Built by George Steuart, it has a leaden dome supported by eight Ionic pilasters. It is a memorial cenotaph to the More family.

== History ==
In 1544 the More family bought the manor of Lower Millichope. Thomas More, who inherited the estate in 1689, started the creation of the surrounding pleasure park. His daughter and heiress Catherine left the estate to her cousin Robert Pemberton, after which it descended to the Revd R. Norgrave Pemberton. He replaced the original house by the present one, leaving it in 1848 to his own cousin Charles Orlando Childe, who thereafter changed his surname to Childe Pemberton (and was High Sheriff of Shropshire in 1859). The latter, after making improvements to the pleasure grounds, passed it to his son, who sold the estate in 1896 to Captain H.J. Beckwith, in whose family it thereafter descended.

Lindsay Bury (senior) and his wife Diana (Moinet) brought up their children Frank and Nancy at Millichope. Frank went off to fight in the Second World War and was killed in the Normandy Landings. Lindsay senior then moved out of the house, believing that it was the end of it being a 'family home'. Between 1948 and 1962 the Hall was used by Shropshire County Council as a boys' secondary boarding (or 'camp') school, housing around 60 pupils. When the school lease expired Lindsay Bury (Jnr) decided to take the family home back in hand. In 1970 Lindsay and Sarah Bury extensively restored, remodeled and reduced the house in size: the parkland was also restored at the same time. In 1998 Lindsay Claude Neils Bury of Millichope Park served as High Sheriff of the county.

The current owners, Frank and Antonia Bury, have undertaken a project to restore the rare 1830s curvilinear glasshouses on the estate.

== See also ==
- Grade II* listed buildings in Shropshire Council (H–Z)
- Listed buildings in Munslow
