= Holy Trinity Church, Holdgate =

Coordinates: 52.5025°N 2.6472°W

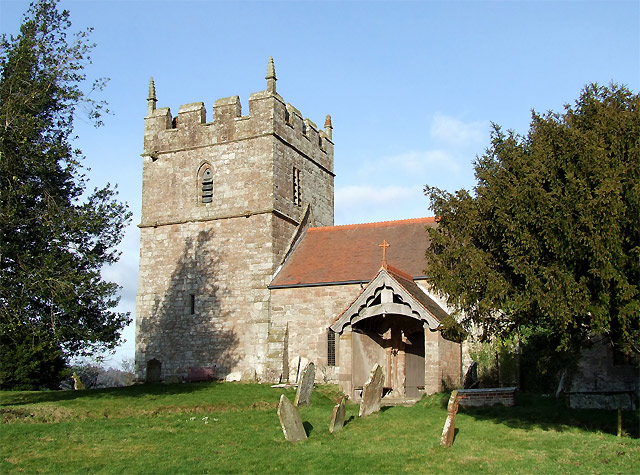
- Holy Trinity Church, Holdgate, from the south

- Location in Shropshire
- OS grid reference: SO 562 896
- Location: Holdgate, Shropshire
- Country: England
- Denomination: Anglican
- Website: Holy Trinity, Holdgate

History
- Status: Parish church

Architecture
- Functional status: Active
- Heritage designation: Grade I
- Designated: 12 November 1954
- Architect(s): J. P. St Aubyn and Henry Wadling (restoration)
- Architectural type: Church
- Style: Norman, Gothic

Specifications
- Materials: Sandstone, tiled roofs

Administration
- Province: Canterbury
- Diocese: Hereford
- Archdeaconry: Ludlow
- Deanery: Ludlow
- Parish: Holdgate

Clergy
- Rector: Revd John Stanley Beesley

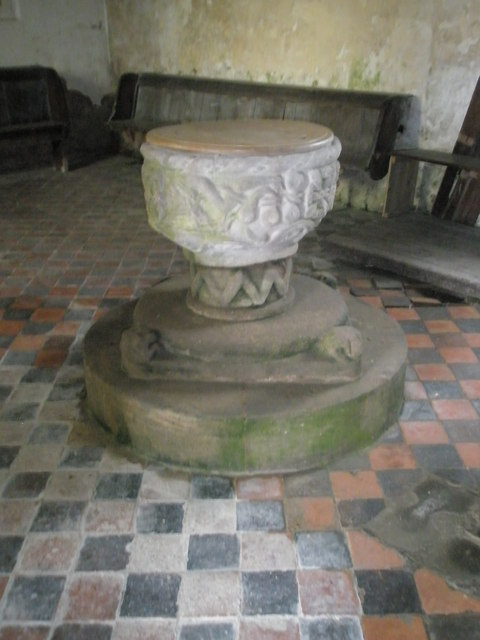
Font

Holy Trinity Church is in the village of Holdgate, Shropshire, England. It is an active Anglican parish church in the deanery of Ludlow, the archdeaconry of Ludlow, and the diocese of Hereford. Its benefice is united with those of St Peter, Diddlebury, Broadstone Church, St Michael, Munslow, and St Catherine, Tugford. The church is recorded in the National Heritage List for England as a designated Grade I listed building. It stands in the former southwest bailey of Holdgate Castle.

== History ==
A church with a priest is recorded in the Domesday Book, but none of the fabric from that church has survived. The nave and possibly part of the chancel date from the 12th century, with the rest of the chancel and the lower part of the tower from the following century. The south porch was probably added in the 14th century. The upper part of the tower was added either in the 15th, or in the 17th century. The west end of the nave was partitioned off as a schoolroom after 1793, and the church was restored and re-pewed in 1854–55. In 1894–95 there was a further restoration by J. P. St Aubyn and Henry Wadling, during which a chancel arch was inserted, windows were renewed, the ceilings were taken down, new roofs and a new porch were built, and the partition in the nave was removed.

== Architecture ==
=== Exterior ===
Holy Trinity is constructed in sandstone with tiled roofs. Its plan consists of a nave with a south porch, a chancel, and a west tower. The tower is in two stages. On three sides of the lower stage are lancet windows. The upper stage contains bell openings on each side, and two string courses, each of which incorporates gargoyles. On the summit is a battlemented parapet with corner pinnacles. The upper stage is Perpendicular in style. In the south wall of the nave is a Norman round-arched doorway with capitals decorated with volutes and foliage. The arch is of three orders, the inner order being carved with beakheads, the middle order with a frieze of arches, and the outer order with zigzags. Above this is a hood mould carved with zigzags and pellets. The windows are mostly Early English, although some of the lancets in the chancel appear to be later insertions. In the south wall of the chancel is a sheela na gig, dating probably from the 12th century.

=== Interior ===
In the north wall of the chancel is an aumbry, and in the south wall is a piscina. The pews are box pews, one of which has a desk dated 1707 attached to its back. Also in the church is a pair of Jacobean seats with carved canopies. The circular Norman font is elaborately carved with rope moulding, a dragon, interlace, foliage, and medallions. In the church are royal arms of 1757. The stained glass in the east window, dating from about 1904, is by Herbert Bryans. In the south wall of the nave is a tomb recess dating from the 14th century. The monuments include brasses from the 17th and 18th centuries. There is a ring of three bells, two dated 1657 and 1666 are by John Martin, and the other dated 1754 is by Abel Rudhall.

== External features ==
In the churchyard are three memorials, each listed at Grade II. To the south of the chancel is an ashlar headstone dated 1716, and to the southeast of the chancel is a similar headstone inscribed with the dates 1748 and 1771. To the south of the nave is a chest tomb dating from the early 19th century.

== See also ==
- Grade I listed churches in Shropshire
- Listed buildings in Abdon, Shropshire
