= Corfton =

Coordinates: 52.460°N 2.743°W

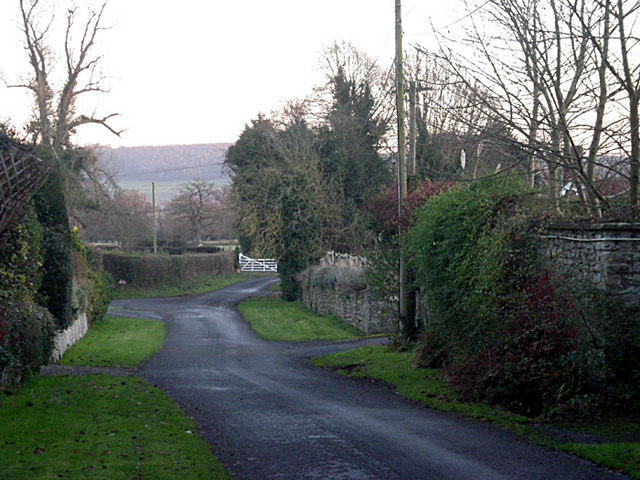
- Corfton

- Location within Shropshire
- OS grid reference: SO495849
- Civil parish: Diddlebury
- Unitary authority: Shropshire
- Ceremonial county: Shropshire
- Region: West Midlands
- Country: England
- Sovereign state: United Kingdom
- Post town: CRAVEN ARMS
- Postcode district: SY7
- Dialling code: 01584
- Police: West Mercia
- Fire: Shropshire
- Ambulance: West Midlands
- UK Parliament: Ludlow

Corfton is a small village in Shropshire, England, located 5 miles (8.0 km) east of Craven Arms and 8 miles (13 km) north of Ludlow, the two nearest towns.

There is a pub, with its own small brewery (the Corvedale Brewery), called The Sun Inn.

It is named after the nearby River Corve.

The Corvedale Three Castles Walk runs through the village.

== History ==
Corfton was recorded in the Domesday Book of 1086; at the time it formed part of the Saxon hundred of Culvestan (which was replaced in the reign of Henry I by Munslow).

== See also ==
- Listed buildings in Diddlebury
