= Beambridge =

Beambridge can refer to the following English places:

- Beambridge, Shropshire
- Beambridge, Cheshire, a village in Worleston

== Other meanings ==
- Beam bridge, a type of bridge
- Bembridge, a village of the Isle of Wight
- Bembridge (surname)
