= Three Castles (disambiguation) =

Three Castles was a medieval lordship in Monmouthshire, Wales, comprising the fortifications of Grosmont, Skenfrith and White Castle.

Three Castles or Threecastles may also refer to:

- Three Castles of Bellinzona, Ticino, Switzerland (namely Castelgrande, Montebello and Sasso Corbaro)
- Three castles of Husseren-les-Châteaux or Eguisheim, Haut-Rhin, Vosges, France (namely the Dagsburg, the Wahlenburg and Weckmund Castle)
- Three castles at Dahn, Rhineland-Palatinate, Germany (namely Altdahn, Grafendahn, Tanstein)
- Threecastles Castle, Blessington, County Wicklow, Ireland.
- Threecastles, County Kilkenny, village in Ireland
- Three Castles Walk (disambiguation), various long-distance footpaths in Britain

== See also ==
- Castle Three, British cycle car made 1919–1922
