= Abdon, Shropshire =

Village in Shropshire, England

Coordinates: 52.4736°N 2.6281°W

Abdon
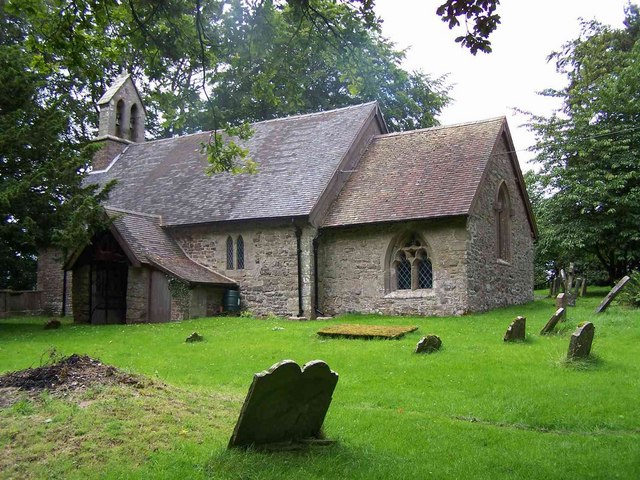
- Abdon, St. Margaret.

- Location within Shropshire
- Population: 199 (2011)
- OS grid reference: SO576863
- Civil parish: Abdon and Heath
- Unitary authority: Shropshire
- Ceremonial county: Shropshire
- Region: West Midlands
- Country: England
- Sovereign state: United Kingdom
- Post town: CRAVEN ARMS
- Postcode district: SY7
- Dialling code: 01746
- Police: West Mercia
- Fire: Shropshire
- Ambulance: West Midlands
- UK Parliament: Ludlow

Abdon is an upland village and former civil parish, now in the parish of Abdon and Heath, in Shropshire, England. In 2011 the parish had a population of 199. It is in the Clee Hills.

== History ==
The name Abdon derives from 'Ab(b)a's estate' (Old English personal name Ab(b)a + tūn). It was called Abetune in the Domesday Book of 1086, when it comprised nine households, and was recorded as Ab(b)eton from about 1200 to 1504, Abbedon in 1301 and Abdon from 1503.

The village had at least 11 households in 1642, 20 that paid hearth tax in 1662 and in 1793, there were 30 houses in the parish. The population of the parish grew from 137 to 170 between 1811 and 1831 but declined to 70 in 1971 and rose slightly to 85 in 1981.

=== 1969 air incident ===
BAC Jet Provost 'XM360' hit Abdon Burf, partly in Cleobury North, on Friday 21 January 1969, with two crew killed, 31 year old Flt Lt John Sims Watson, born in South Shields, an instructor and 21 year old Pilot Officer Ian Scott Primrose, from Stirling, Scotland.

== Clee Hills ==
Abdon is a remote rural hamlet on the slopes of the Brown Clee Hill. The population currently stands at approx. 28 dwellings. The hamlet includes a parish church (St Margaret's), a village hall and the remains of a deserted medieval village. The hamlet is very close to the remains of an Iron Age hill fort now known as Nordy Bank, situated on the southern end of the Brown Clee. Abdon has a lively community, with regular events at the village hall.

The Abdon parish registers begin in the 1560s but are only complete from 1614 on, with a gap from 1641 to 1649.

== Civil parish ==
The civil parish was large and included other settlements, including Tugford and Holdgate which were transferred into the parish in the late 20th century. The civil parish was abolished on 1 April 2017 and merged with Heath to form Abdon and Heath.

== See also ==
- Listed buildings in Abdon, Shropshire
