= Abdon and Heath =

Civil parish in Shropshire, England

Coordinates: 52.487°N 2.636°W

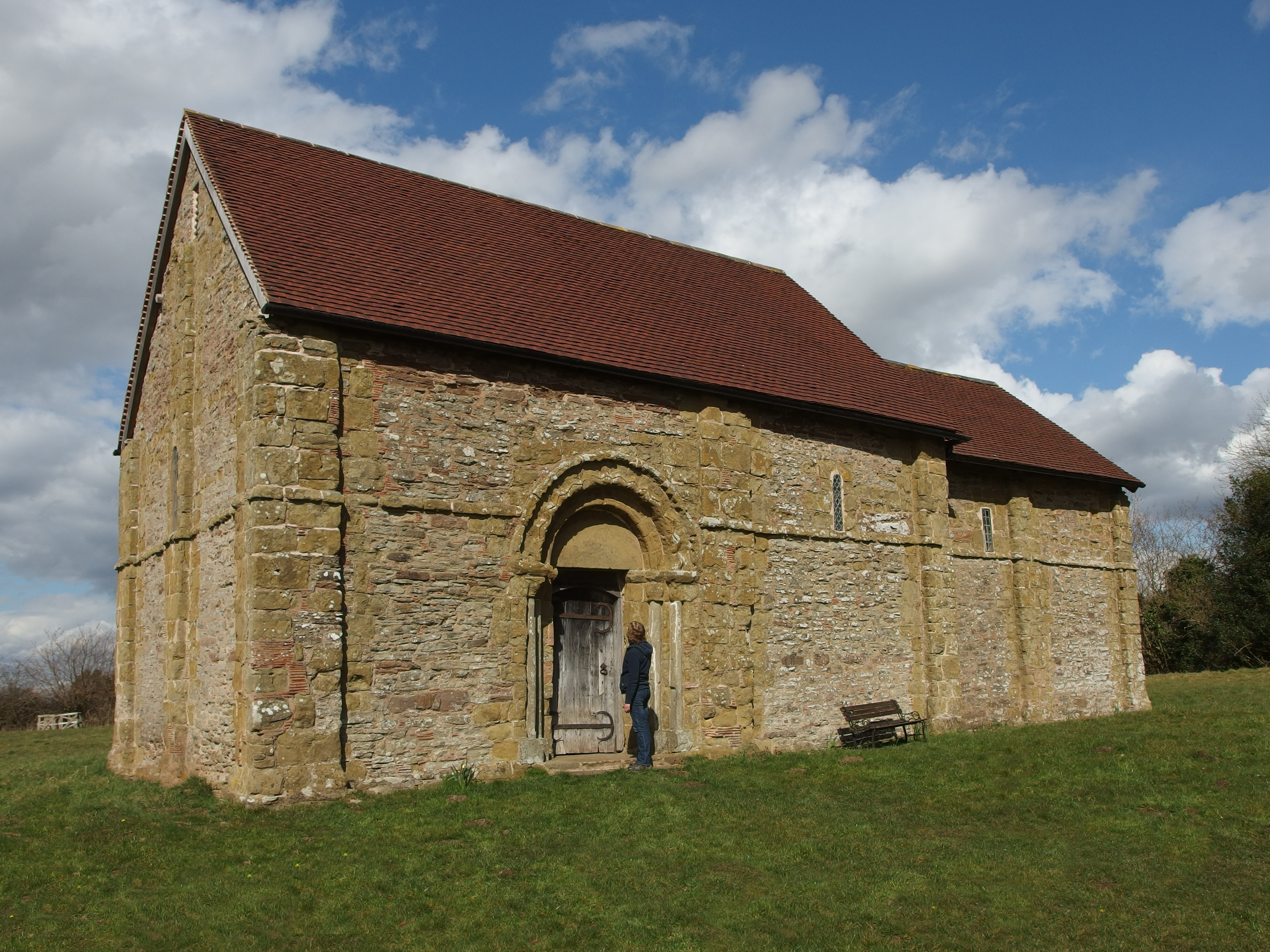
- The grade I listed 12th-century Heath Chapel

- Location within Shropshire
- Area: 22.84 km^{2} (8.82 sq mi)
- Population: 202 (2021 census)
  - Density: 9/km^{2} (23/sq mi)
- Civil parish: Abdon and Heath
- Unitary authority: Shropshire
- Ceremonial county: Shropshire
- Region: West Midlands
- Country: England
- Sovereign state: United Kingdom
- Police: West Mercia
- Fire: Shropshire
- Ambulance: West Midlands
- Website: https://www.hugofox.com/community/abdon-and-heath-parish-10606/home/

Abdon and Heath is a civil parish in the Shropshire unitary authority district of the ceremonial county of Shropshire, England. The parish includes the settlements of Abdon, Balaams Heath, Baucott, Brookhampton, Heath, Holdgate and Tugford. It lies north east of Craven Arms and south west of Bridgnorth, rising from the River Corve to the north west to include Abdon Burf, the summit of Brown Clee Hill at 540 m (1,770 ft) in the south east. Stage 7 of the Shropshire Way long-distance path crosses the parish. In 2021 the parish had a population of 202.

It was created on 1 April 2017 by combining the previously separate civil parishes of Abdon and Heath.

It has a parish council, the lowest tier of local government in England; this has five councillors.

The parish includes 31 listed buildings, ranging from the 12th-century Heath Chapel to a 1935 K6 phone box, and three scheduled ancient monuments including a deserted medieval village.

== See also ==
- Listed buildings in Abdon, Shropshire Former parish
- Listed buildings in Heath, Shropshire Former parish
