= Bouldon =

Hamlet in Shropshire, England

Coordinates: 52.462°N 2.670°W

Bouldon: Boulden
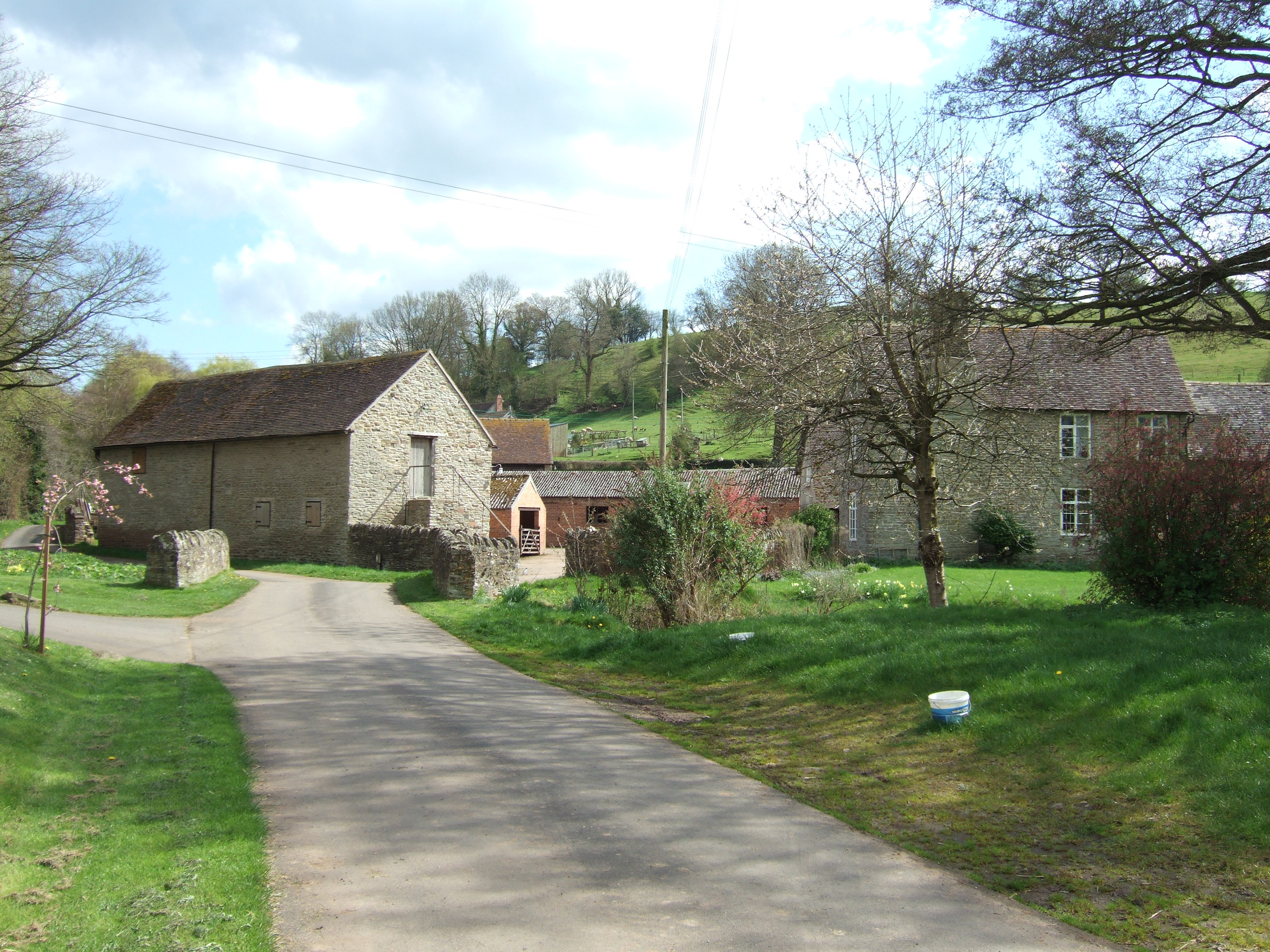
- Stone farm buildings, at Bouldon Farm, in the centre of Bouldon. The lane crosses the Pye Brook, which flows through the hamlet.

- Location within Shropshire
- OS grid reference: SO545851
  - London: 151 miles (243 km)
- Civil parish: Diddlebury
- Unitary authority: Shropshire
- Ceremonial county: Shropshire
- Region: West Midlands
- Country: England
- Sovereign state: United Kingdom
- Post town: CRAVEN ARMS
- Postcode district: SY7
- Dialling code: 01584
- Police: West Mercia
- Fire: Shropshire
- Ambulance: West Midlands
- UK Parliament: Ludlow

Bouldon is a hamlet in Shropshire, England. It lies in the civil parish of Diddlebury.

The hamlet comprises approximately 14 houses, a number of agricultural buildings and a public house named the "Tally Ho". It is 8.5 miles (13.7 km) by road northeast of the market town of Ludlow.

== Etymology ==
In the Domesday Book of 1086 it was written as "Bolledone". In 1166 it was written as "Bullardone". The second part of the name likely comes from the Old English word for hill ("dun") whilst the meaning of the first part is unknown. It could be either from the Old English word for bullocks ("bula"); a personal name: "Ballu" or "Bulla"; or the name of a tribe: "Bulwana". It has been conjectured by some that the various earlier spellings and uncertain origin of the name is because a settlement relocated to where Bouldon today is.

The place name is also written as Boulden and this spelling is used for the habitational surname that originates from the hamlet. This indicates also an alternative origin for the second part of the name, the Old English word for a valley "denu".

== History ==
The Domesday Book of 1086 records 4 households existing at the time. Bouldon was at that time part of Culvestan hundred, a Saxon hundred that was in the early 12th century replaced by Munslow.

From the late 11th century to 1884, Bouldon was a detached part of Holdgate parish. Its transfer to Diddlebury parish was effectively a return to the situation prior to the change in the 11th century. (Bouldon was transferred to the Church of England's ecclesiastical parish of Diddlebury, from Holdgate, only in 1921.)

Bouldon used to be a more populous place, as was this rural area of Shropshire generally, and was a place to stop en route between Ludlow and Bridgnorth. The route from Bouldon to Ludlow was a turnpike road between 1794 and 1873. The main road between the towns of Ludlow and Bridgnorth no longer passes through the hamlet; it today takes a route to the east of Brown Clee Hill instead.

Bouldon Mill is Grade II Listed former mill building in the hamlet, now a residence/therapy centre, which still has the Coalbrookdale iron-cast water wheel (using the flow of the Pye Brook) and inside workings. The stone building was built in 1790 but there was a timber mill beforehand built in 1611. It may have operated as a mill as late as the 1930s.

There is also a house on the site where a small church, built from corrugated iron, used to be. This small church, or chapel, was called All Saints and was erected by the rector of the Church of England's Holdgate parish (which Bouldon was part of until 1921) in 1873. It was demolished in the 1980s, having become dilapidated.

Bouldon had a charcoal-fuelled ironworks of its own in the 17th and 18th centuries, producing pig iron. It was important during the English Civil War. On 28 September 1643, Charles I authorised payment of £965 10s. to the iron master, Francis Walker, for manufacture of artillery and ammunition delivered to the Royalist forces at Shrewsbury, Bridgnorth and Worcester. It closed around 1795 and only a tree covered slag heap remains.

The Tally Ho Inn was first licensed in 1844. It closed in 2006, but reopened in 2012 as a locally owned freehouse, and retains its country character and serves several local real ales.

In Bouldon, and also in nearby Peaton and Peatonstrand, weather-board houses were constructed in the 1950s by the Church Commissioners, who bought the Holder Estate in 1942. Of the four in Bouldon, two are currently derelict. The ones in Bouldon are named Cedarwood Houses.

=== Listed buildings ===
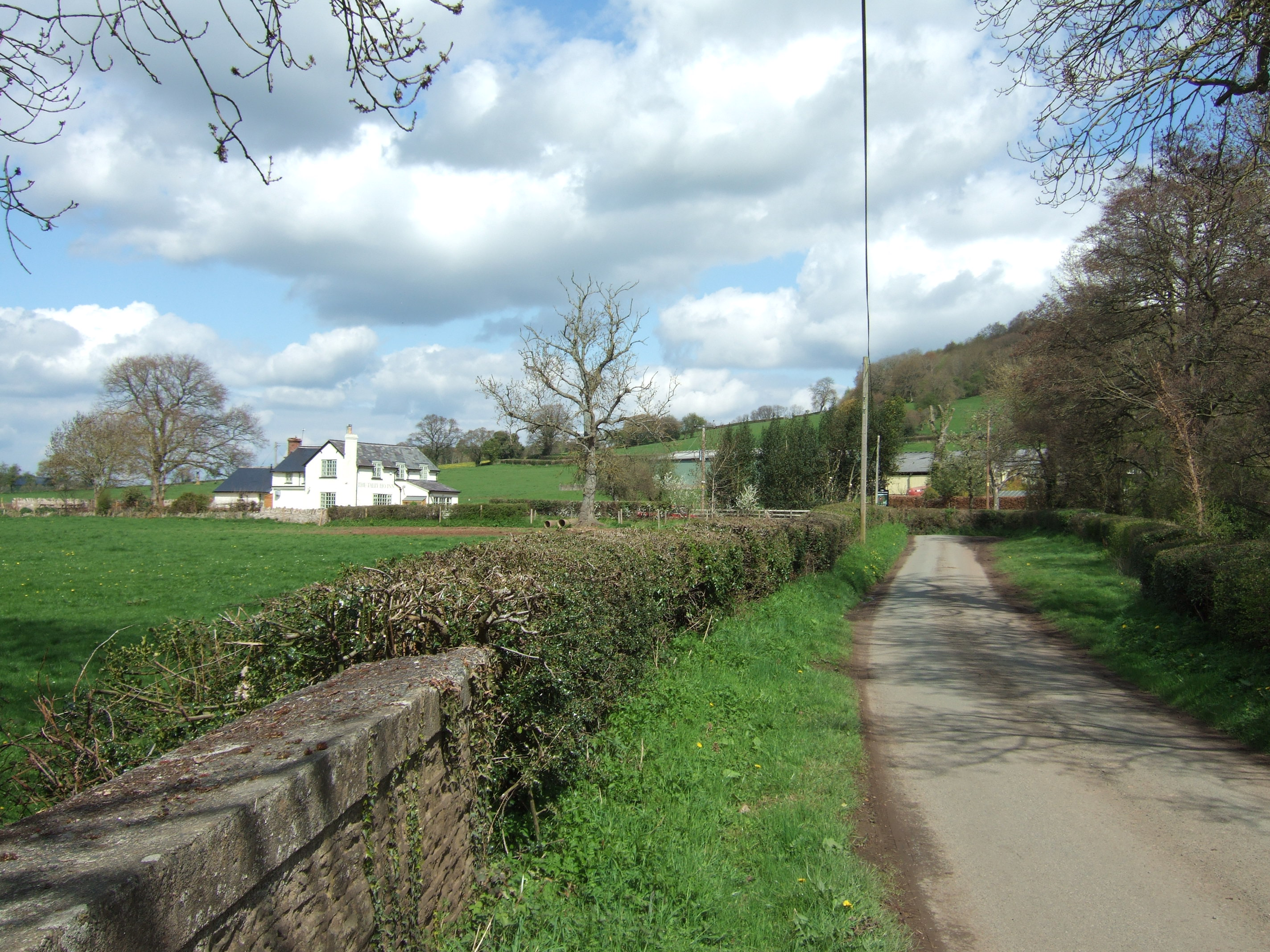
Crossing the Pye Brook from Peaton, the first (white) building is the Tally Ho public house.

There are 5 Listed buildings in Bouldon, all Grade II: the early 19th century Wynetts Bank Cottage, the 17th / 19th century Bouldon Farmhouse, two separate barns near Bouldon Farmhouse, and Bouldon Mill (as described in the history section).

== Geography ==
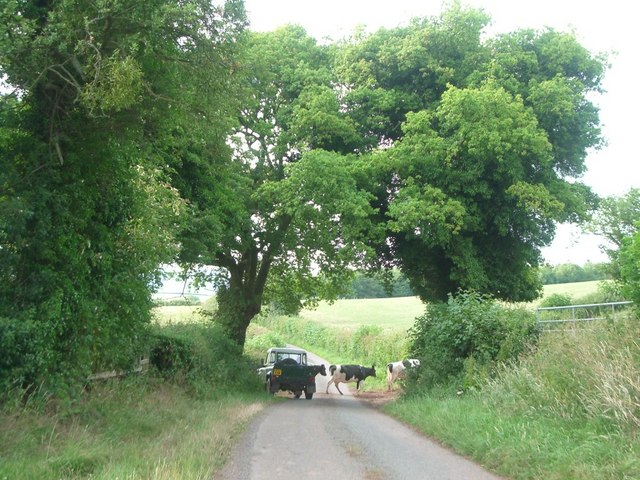
Cattle crossing the Bouldon to Tugford lane.

Bouldon lies on the Pye Brook (which is known as the Clee Brook immediately upstream of Bouldon), at approximately 145 metres (476 ft) above sea level, and is located on the eastern boundary of the relatively flat Corvedale, where the valley meets the upland Clee Hills.

=== Nearby localities ===
A mile (1.6 km) to the northeast, in the neighbouring parish of Heath, is a notable historic chapel. A mile to the north is Broncroft Castle, a medieval fortified manor house, extensively renovated in the 19th century. A mile to the west, on the lane to Diddlebury, is the hamlet of Peaton, with Peatonstrand roughly half-way.

Diddlebury is a larger village, with a parish church and a primary school, 2.75 miles (4.43 km) to the west and on the other side of the River Corve. Craven Arms is 8.0 miles (12.9 km) by road to the west, and Church Stretton is 11 miles (18 km) by road to the northwest.

=== Area of Outstanding Natural Beauty ===
Bouldon lies partially within the Shropshire Hills Area of Outstanding Natural Beauty (AONB). The boundary runs along the lane to Peaton/Diddlebury and along the lane to Broncroft/Tugford, with the southern and eastern buildings of the hamlet falling within the AONB.

=== Transport ===
The only public transport provided currently in Bouldon are school buses to Ludlow in the morning, returning in the late afternoon (The school buses do not allow the public to board them). These services (176 and 715) are provided solely for travel to and from schools and colleges, and only run on schooldays.

The nearest railway stations are Ludlow and Craven Arms, both approximately 8 miles (13 km) away by road.

== See also ==
- Listed buildings in Diddlebury
