= Tugford =

Village in Shropshire, England

Coordinates: 52.479°N 2.654°W

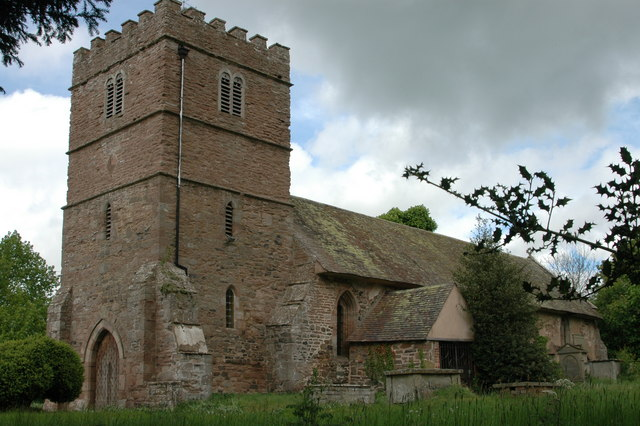
- St Catherine's church, Tugford

- Location within Shropshire
- OS grid reference: SO555870
  - London: 151 miles (243 km)
- Civil parish: Abdon and Heath
- Unitary authority: Shropshire
- Ceremonial county: Shropshire
- Region: West Midlands
- Country: England
- Sovereign state: United Kingdom
- Post town: CRAVEN ARMS
- Postcode district: SY7
- Dialling code: 01584
- Police: West Mercia
- Fire: Shropshire
- Ambulance: West Midlands
- UK Parliament: Ludlow

Tugford is a village and former civil parish, now in the parish of Abdon and Heath, in the Shropshire district, in the ceremonial county of Shropshire, England. It lies between Bouldon and Holdgate, on the boundary of the relatively flat Corvedale and the upland Clee Hills.

The church of St Catherine dates from the 12th century and is a Grade II* listed building. It features two sheela na gig statues.

== History ==
In 1676 the parish had 103 adult inhabitants. In 1801 the population rose to 165 and then rose again to 197 ten years later. Since then the population has been in decline and by 1961 it was just 86.

On 1 April 1987 the parish was abolished and merged with Abdon and Heath, in 2017 it became part of "Abdon and Heath".

== See also ==
- Listed buildings in Abdon, Shropshire
