= Listed buildings in Abdon, Shropshire =

Abdon is a former civil parish, now in the parish of Abdon and Heath, in Shropshire, England, and includes the settlements of Abdon, Tugford, Beambridge, and Holdgate. It contains 22 listed buildings that are recorded in the National Heritage List for England. Of these, one is listed at Grade I, the highest of the three grades, three are at Grade II*, the middle grade, and the others are at Grade II, the lowest grade. The parish is entirely rural. Most of the listed buildings are churches and associated structures in the churchyards. The other listed buildings consist of houses, a former mill and stables, a bridge, and a telephone kiosk.

== Key ==
Grade	Criteria
I	Buildings of exceptional interest, sometimes considered to be internationally important
II*	Particularly important buildings of more than special interest
II	Buildings of national importance and special interest

== Buildings ==
Name and location	Photograph	Date	Notes	Grade
St Catherine's Church, Tugford; 52.47966°N 2.65353°W		Before 1138 (probable)	The oldest part of the church is the nave, the chancel and tower dating from the 14th century, and the tower being heightened in 1720. The church is in sandstone, partly rendered, and has a tiled roof with coped gables. It consists of a nave and chancel in one cell, a south porch, and a west tower. The tower has three stages, clasping buttresses, lancet windows, an embattled parapet, and a pyramidal roof with a weathervane. There is a Norman window in the north wall of the nave, and flanking the doorway are two sheela na gigs.	II*
Holy Trinity Church, Holdgate; 52.50245°N 2.64722°W		12th century	The oldest parts of the church are the nave and part of the chancel. The tower dates from the 13th century, and was heightened in the 15th century. The church was restored and partly rebuilt in 1894–95 by St Aubyn and Wadling. It is in sandstone and has tiled roofs with coped gables. The church consists of a nave with a south porch, a chancel, and a west tower. The tower has two stages, lancet windows, two string courses with gargoyles, and an embattled parapet with corner pinnacles. In the south wall of the nave is a Norman round-arched doorway, and in the south wall of the chancel is a sheela na gig.	I
St Margaret's Church, Abdon; 52.47572°N 2.62656°W		16th century	Most of the church results from a rebuilding in 1731, and it was restored in 1860. The church is in stone, it has a tile roof with bargeboards, and consists of a nave, a chancel, and a south porch, and has a bellcote on the west gable. In the north wall are lancet windows, and the east window and a window in the south wall contain decorated tracery.	II*
Holdgate Hall; 52.50327°N 2.64643°W	—	16th century	A farmhouse incorporating the remaining part of Holdgate Castle, which dates from the late 13th or early 14th century. The farmhouse is in stone with a tiled roof. It has two storeys, a cellar and an attic, and consists of a main range with six bays, a rear wing consisting of the lower two storeys of a circular castle tower, and a single-storey extension wing to the left. On the front some windows are mullioned or mullioned and transomed, elsewhere there are casement windows, and in the castle remains are arrow slits. On the castle remains is a conical roof. The castle remains are a Scheduled Monument.	II
Upper Earnstrey Park; 52.48292°N 2.61555°W	—	c. 1600	A farmhouse, later a private house, that had some rebuilding in the 17th century, and alterations and extensions in the 18th century. The main part is in brick and the extension in stone. The house has dentilled eaves and a tiled roof. It consists of a main range of two bays and two cross-wings, with two storeys and an attic. The windows vary: some are mullioned, one is mullioned and transomed, most are later casement windows, and there are two 20th-century dormers. It is one of the earliest brick houses in the area.	II*
Castlemoor; 52.49327°N 2.65287°W	—	Early 17th century	A farmhouse that was extended to the rear in the early 19th century. The original part is timber framed with brick nogging and wattle and daub infill, which has been partly replaced in limestone with brick quoins. It has three storeys and three bays, and the extension is in brick with two storeys. The roof is tiled, and the windows are casements.	II
Holdgate Farmhouse; 52.49915°N 2.64939°W	—	17th century	The farmhouse was later extended to the rear. It is timber framed with brick infill on a stone plinth, and has a roof partly in slate and partly in tile. There are two storeys, a main range of two bays, with a single storey extension to the side, and a two-storey three-bay rear wing. The windows are casements.	II
Marlyns; 52.48044°N 2.65180°W	—	17th century	A house, extended in the 20th century, is timber framed with rendered infill, and the extension is in stone. It has a tiled roof, and a T-shaped plan. The main part has two storeys, and the extension has one storey and an attic. The windows are casements, and there is a bay window and a gabled porch.	II
Old Rectory; 52.47963°N 2.65423°W	—	17th century	A rectory, later a private house, that was extended in the 19th century by the addition of a parallel range to the north. It is in stone, and has a tiled roof with a decorated wood eaves fascia and bargeboards. The house has two storeys and a cellar, and three bays. On the south front are canted bay windows, and a door with a gabled canopy on carved brackets. In the roof on the south front are gabled half-dormers containing sash windows; the other windows are casements.	II
Headstone south of porch of St Margaret's Church; 52.47566°N 2.62652°W	—	1705	The headstone is in sandstone and consists of a rectangular slab that is set vertically. It has an inscribed tablet with a plain raised border and set-back carving on the head. The dedication is unknown.	II
Memorial south of chancel of Holy Trinity Church; 52.50244°N 2.64705°W	—	1716	The memorial is a stone headstone, a thick rectangular slab set vertically with a segmental top and a recessed inscribed panel with a thick raised border.	II
Memorial southeast of chancel of Holy Trinity Church; 52.50246°N 2.64687°W	—	Mid 18th century	The memorial commemorates Francis Hudson and his wife. It is in stone, and consists of a slab with a carved border, and a head with a twin panelled inscription.	II
Barn south of Holy Trinity Church; 52.50216°N 2.64658°W	—	18th century	The barn is timber framed on a stone plinth with weatherboarding on the gable ends. It has a tiled roof, a single storeys with a loft, five bays, and a rear extension. On the north front are a doorway and loft doors.	II
Two headstones south-southeast of St Margaret's Church; 52.47569°N 2.62640°W	—	Mid 18th century	The headstones are in ashlar stone. The headstone to the west is to the memory of John Ward, and is set horizontally. It has an inscribed bordered panel with volute ornament on the upper face and an ornamented curved head. The other headstone is set vertically and has an inscribed bordered panel and a curved head.	II
Headstone east of chancel of St Margaret's Church; 52.47576°N 2.62639°W	—	Mid 18th century	The headstone is in sandstone and is to the memory of Sarah Deuce. It consists of a rectangular slab that is set vertically, and has a curved raised top and an inscribed beaded panel.	II
Upper House; 52.47323°N 2.62771°W	—	18th century	The house was extended in 1816. The original part is in stone and has an L-shaped plan, with a main range and a left projecting wing. The additions consist of a brick extension to the right of the main range, and a stone rear wing. The roof is in slate and is hipped, and there are two storeys with an attic. The windows vary: some are mullioned and transomed, and they contain sashes or casements. All the openings have segmental heads. Along the front of the main range is a verandah.	II
Tugford Mill; 52.47920°N 2.65241°W	—	Late 18th century	A watermill in stone with a tiled roof, it has a rectangular plan, and two storeys with an attic. The doorways, windows and wheel opening all have segmental heads.	II
Stables, Tugford Mill; 52.47928°N 2.65232°W	—	Late 18th century	The stables, later used for other purposes, are to the east of the mill. The building is in stone with a tiled roof, and has a rectangular plan, one storey and a loft. The doorways have segmental arches, there are triangular ventilation openings on the east side, and loft doors on the east and north sides.	II
Beam Bridge; 52.48955°N 2.69039°W		c. 1811	The bridge carries a road over the River Corve. It is in stone, and consists of a single arch with voussoirs. The bridge has a parapet with rounded copings, and the approach walls are splayed.	II
Memorial south of nave of Holy Trinity Church; 52.50229°N 2.64731°W	—	Early 19th century	The memorial commemorates Jeremiah Bebb and his wife. It is in stone, and consists of a chest tomb with a flat lid and a moulded cornice. It has inscribed panels, horizontally fluted corner piers, and a plain plinth.	II
Three chest tombs south of St Margaret's Church; 52.47564°N 2.62663°W	—	Early to mid 19th century	The chest tombs are in sandstone. The one to the north has a plain chamfered plinth, corner piers. and panels on the ends and sides, those on the sides with inscriptions. On the top is a plain lid with a beaded edge. The tomb to the south is similar but with no inscription in the panels. The central tomb is similar to the tomb to the south, and also has vertical bands of horizontal fluting on the piers.	II
Telephone kiosk 52.50206°N 2.64713°W		1935	A K6 type telephone kiosk, designed by Giles Gilbert Scott. Constructed in cast iron with a square plan and a dome, it has three unperforated crowns in the top panels.	II
