= Three Castles Walk =

Three Castles Walk may refer to:

- Three Castles Walk, Monmouthshire, the footpath in Wales
- Corvedale Three Castles Walk, the footpath in Shropshire
- Three Castles Path, the footpath in Southern England
