= Bembridge (surname) =

Bembridge is a surname. Notable people with the surname include:

- Brian Sidney Bembridge (born 1973), American scenic, lighting, and costume designer
- Garett Bembridge (born 1981), Canadian ice hockey player
- Henry Bembridge (1852–?), English cricketer
- Maurice Bembridge (1945–2024), English golfer
- Sarah Bembridge (1793–1880), English Primitive Methodist preacher
