= Beambridge, Shropshire =

Coordinates: 52.489°N 2.691°W

Beambridge
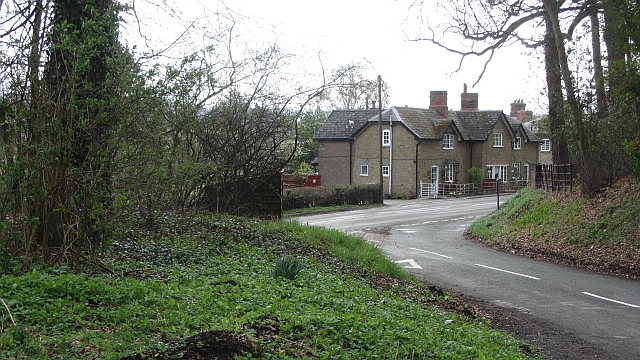
- Beambridge

- Location within Shropshire
- OS grid reference: SO530881
- Civil parish: Abdon and Heath; Munslow
- Unitary authority: Shropshire
- Ceremonial county: Shropshire
- Region: West Midlands
- Country: England
- Sovereign state: United Kingdom
- Post town: CRAVEN ARMS
- Postcode district: SY7
- Dialling code: 01584
- Police: West Mercia
- Fire: Shropshire
- Ambulance: West Midlands
- UK Parliament: Ludlow

Beambridge is a village in Shropshire, England.

== See also ==
- Listed buildings in Abdon, Shropshire
- Listed buildings in Munslow
