= Peaton =

Hamlet in Shropshire, England

Coordinates: 52.459°N 2.691°W

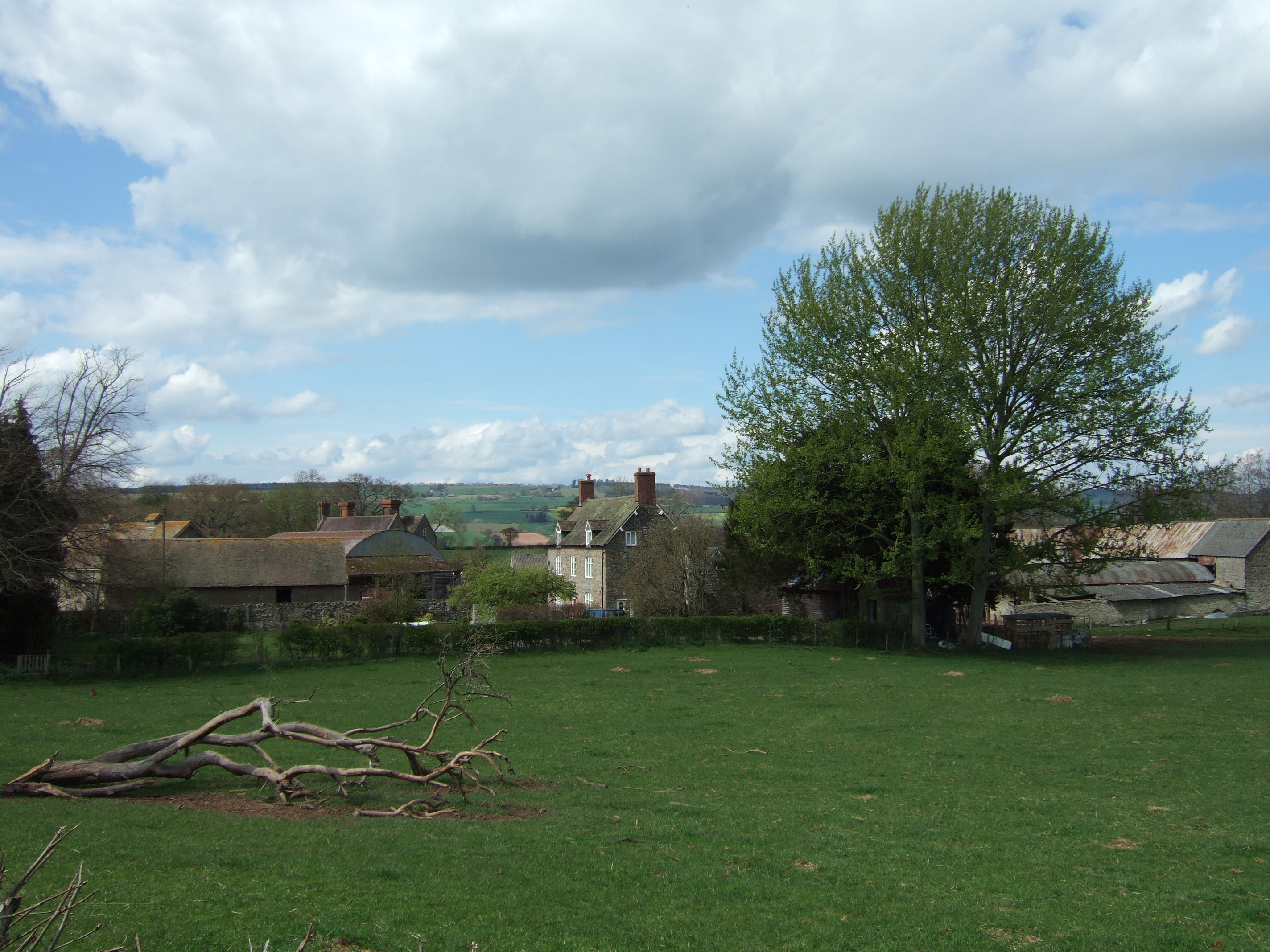
- Peaton, viewed from the lane to Bouldon

- Location within Shropshire
- OS grid reference: SO530848
  - London: 151 miles (243 km)
- Civil parish: Diddlebury
- Unitary authority: Shropshire
- Ceremonial county: Shropshire
- Region: West Midlands
- Country: England
- Sovereign state: United Kingdom
- Post town: CRAVEN ARMS
- Postcode district: SY7
- Dialling code: 01584
- Police: West Mercia
- Fire: Shropshire
- Ambulance: West Midlands
- UK Parliament: Ludlow

Peaton is a hamlet in the civil parish of Diddlebury in Shropshire, England.

It is situated in the Corvedale, between Diddlebury and Bouldon. The Pye Brook flows past the hamlet, with Peaton Bridge taking the Bouldon-Diddlebury lane across it. The hamlet lies at 124 metres (407 ft) above sea level.

A smaller hamlet called Peatonstrand lies further towards Bouldon at grid reference SO539845; it is partly situated in the valley of the Strand Brook and partly along the lane to Bouldon where the Strand has its confluence with the larger Pye Brook.

The towns of Ludlow and Craven Arms are both about 7 miles (11 km) distant, by road.

== History ==
=== Etymology ===
The name "Peaton" derives from "Peatta's farm".

=== Buildings ===
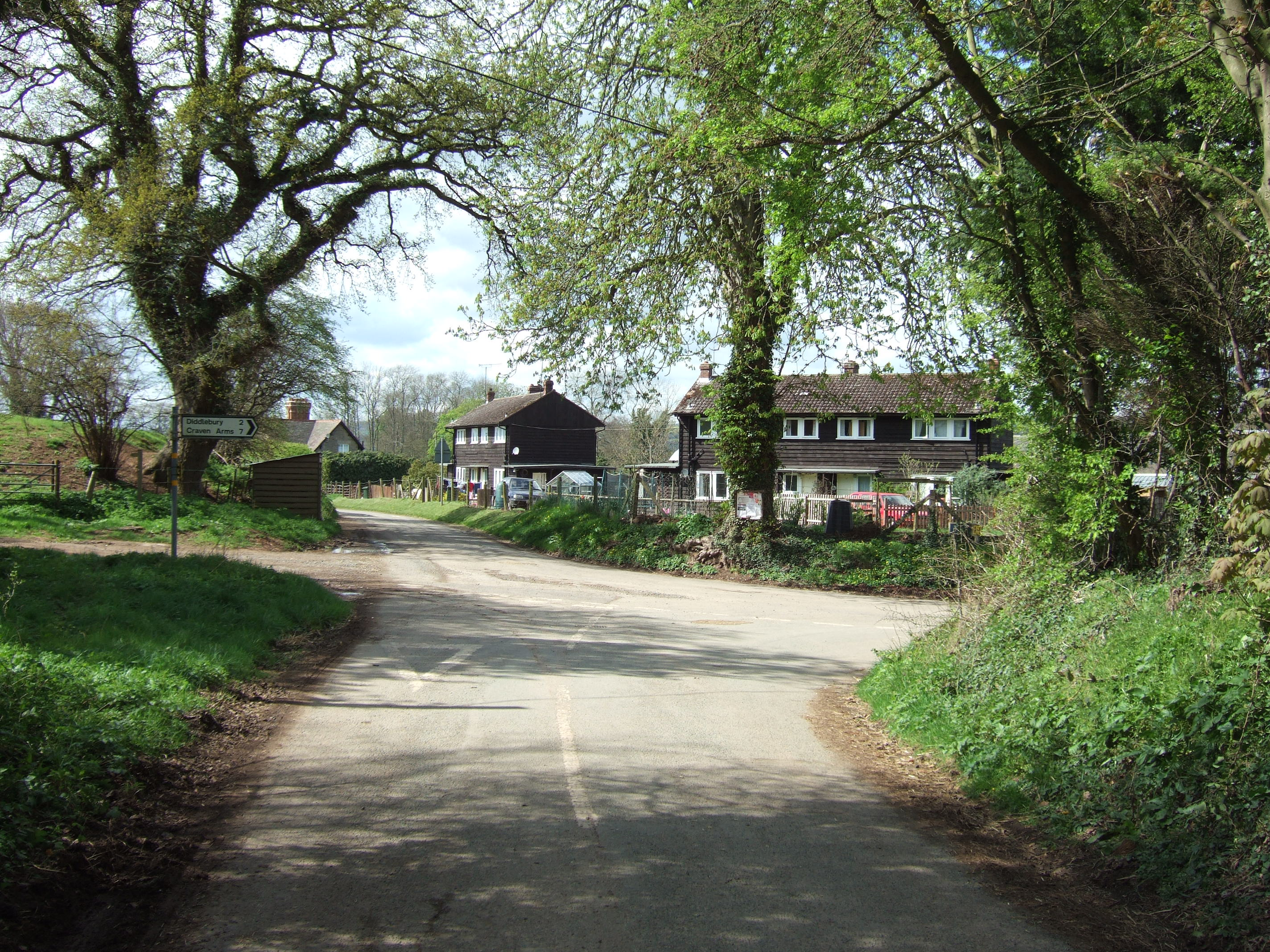
Weatherboard houses ("Timber Cottages") at the main road junction in Peaton - the old turnpike to Ludlow is straight on

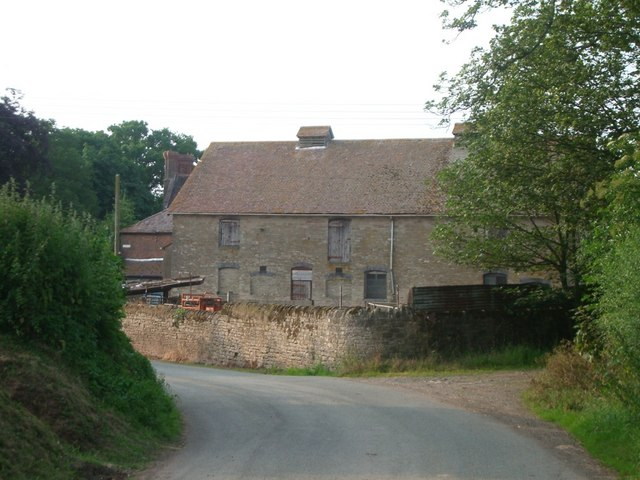
Farm building in Peaton

Immediately West of Peaton, 460m on the other side of the Pye Brook, is the site of the large extinct village of Corfham and the remaining foundations of Corfham Castle, a mid-12th century motte and bailey fortress. Corfham and the land that would become Peaton were within the hundred of Culvestan in 1086 according to the Domesday Book.

Peaton Hall is a Grade II Listed building dating from the 16th or 17th century. Also Listed are 18th-century garden walls adjacent to the hall and 2 barns approximately 100 metres away. Brook Cottage is a 17th-century house, also Grade II Listed, in the hamlet. At Peatonstrand is New House Farmhouse, a Grade II 17th-century farmhouse.

There was a Primitive Methodist chapel at Peatonstrand from 1873 to 1984.

During World War II some farm buildings in Peaton were transformed into a factory, producing fuel tanks for Stirling bombers. A sentry building was erected at the entrance to the site, still there but derelict.

There are 6 weather-boarded houses at Peaton (called "Timber Cottages") and 4 at Peatonstrand, built in the 1950s by the Church Commissioners (who bought the Holder Estate in 1942). There are also 4 in Bouldon.

== Transport ==
=== Bus ===
The only public transport provided currently in Peaton are school buses to Ludlow in the morning, returning in the late afternoon, (The school buses do not allow the public to board them). These services (176 and 715) are provided solely for travel to and from schools and colleges, and only run on schooldays.

=== Train ===
The nearest railway stations are Craven Arms and Ludlow, both roughly 7 miles by road.

== See also ==
- Listed buildings in Diddlebury
