= Listed buildings in Heath, Shropshire =

Heath is a former civil parish, now in the parish of Abdon and Heath, in Shropshire, England. It contains nine listed buildings that are recorded in the National Heritage List for England. Of these, one is listed at Grade I, the highest of the three grades, and the others are at Grade II, the lowest grade. The parish contains the hamlet of Heath and is otherwise entirely rural. The most important listed building in the parish is the Norman Heath Chapel, which is listed at Grade I, and the other listed buildings are all farmhouses and farm buildings.

== Key ==
Grade	Criteria
I	Buildings of exceptional interest, sometimes considered to be internationally important
II	Buildings of national importance and special interest

== Buildings ==
Name and location	Photograph	Date	Notes	Grade
Heath Chapel; 52.46672°N 2.65310°W		12th century	This is a small chapel built in sandstone with a tile roof. It was altered in the late 17th century, repaired in about 1870, and again in 1912. The chapel is in Norman style, and consists of a nave and a lower chancel, with buttresses and a string course. The windows are small, most are slit windows, and in the north wall of the nave is a chamfered mullioned window. The south doorway has a round arch with two orders.	I
Upper Norncott Farmhouse; 52.46980°N 2.63681°W	—	16th century	The farmhouse is timber framed with brick infill on a stone plinth, with a later stone wing and a corrugated iron roof. It has one storey, an attic and a cellar, three bays, and a single-story cross-wing. Most of the windows are casements, and there is one mullioned and transomed window.	II
Barn, Upper Norncott Farmhouse; 52.46992°N 2.63649°W	—	17th century	A barn and cowhouse in a continuous range, it is timber framed on a stone plinth with weatherboarding and some cladding in corrugated iron and a corrugated iron roof. There are six bays, a doorway in each bay, and pitching holes in the gable ends.	II
Barn, Granary and Cart Shed, Heath House; 52.46618°N 2.65412°W	—	1684	The farm buildings are in stone with tile roofs, and form an L-shaped plan. The barn has a single storey and a loft, three bays, doorways, windows, ventilation slits and a pitching hole. The granary has two storeys, one bay and a two-bay cross-wing. The cart shed is an open gabled bay.	II
Cowhouse, barn and sheds, Lower Norncott Farm; 52.47608°N 2.64137°W	—	18th century	The farm buildings form a continuous range, and are in brick on a stone plinth, the gable ends are timber framed with weatherboarding, and the roofs are partly tiled and partly in corrugated iron. The cowhouse has a loft and three bays, and contains ventilation holes. Elsewhere are various doors and windows.	II
Barn and sheds south of Heath Chapel; 52.46614°N 2.65267°W	—	18th century	The barn is partly timber framed with weatherboarding, partly in stone, and partly in brick on a stone plinth. The roof is tiled, and in corrugated iron sheets. The barn has five bays, some of which are open, and it contains ventilation holes and a pitching hole. To the south are single-storey shelter sheds with two ranges of six and three bays, forming an L-shaped plan, and with tiled roofs.	II
Heath House; 52.46618°N 2.65483°W	—	Mid 18th century	The farmhouse was remodelled in the early 19th century. It is in stone, the west front is rendered, and it has a hipped slate roof. The house has a double-pile plan, three storeys, and a west front of three bays. There are canted bay windows on the west and east fronts, and the other windows are a mix of sashes, casements, mullioned and mullioned and transomed windows.	II
Lower Norncott Farmhouse; 52.47587°N 2.64060°W	—	18th century	The farmhouse is in stone with a tile roof. There are three storeys, three bays, and a two-storey rear wing. The windows are casements with segmental heads, and above the central doorway is a gabled slate canopy.	II
Stable block, Heath House; 52.46643°N 2.65468°W	—	Late 18th or early 19th century	The stable block to the north of the house is in stone with a tile roof, and has an L-shaped plan. It has two storeys and a loft, and contains stable doors and windows with segmental heads, and in the loft are round windows with voussoirs.	II
