= Listed buildings in Diddlebury =

Diddlebury is a civil parish in Shropshire, England. It contains 40 listed buildings that are recorded in the National Heritage List for England. Of these, three are at Grade II*, the middle of the three grades, and the others are at Grade II, the lowest grade. The parish contains the village of Diddlebury and smaller settlements including Bouldon, Corfton, and Peaton, and is almost entirely rural. Most of the listed buildings are houses, cottages, farmhouses and farm buildings, many of which are basically timber framed. The other listed buildings include a church with Saxon origins, a country house developed from a medieval castle, a former manor house, a Georgian country house and associated structures, a corn mill converted into a house, and a war memorial.

== Key ==
Grade	Criteria
II*	Particularly important buildings of more than special interest
II	Buildings of national importance and special interest

== Buildings ==
Name and location	Photograph	Date	Notes	Grade
St Peter's Church; 52.46406°N 2.72499°W		Late Saxon	The earliest part of the church is the nave, which is Saxon. The chancel is Norman, and the tower dates from the 12th century. In the 13th century the south aisle was added, and the chancel was remodelled in the 14th century. The church was restored in 1883 by Thomas Nicholson. It is built in sandstone with tile roofs, and consists of a nave with a south aisle and a south porch, a north transept, a chancel, and a west tower. The tower has buttresses, a blocked Saxon doorway, an embattled parapet and a weathervane.	II*
Broncroft Castle and attached wall 52.47698°N 2.67171°W		14th century	The remains of a medieval castle were extended to create a country house in about 1868. It is in sandstone with tile roofs, and has two storeys. The southwest tower is medieval up to the battlements, to the left is a machicolated entrance tower, and to the left of that is a double-gabled wing with a bay window. At the rear is another embattled tower over the service quarters, and extending from the house for about 30 metres (98 ft) is a stone wall about 2 metres (6 ft 7 in) high.	II
Elsich Manor; 52.45181°N 2.74944°W	—	16th century	The east wing of the former manor house is the older part, the west wing being added in about 1600. It is in sandstone with a tile roof, and has two massive chimney stacks. There are two storeys and attics, an E-shaped plan, and gabled wings at the rear. Most of the windows are mullioned with chamfered surrounds.	II*
Sutton Court Farmhouse; 52.43788°N 2.71888°W		16th century	The farmhouse, which was extended in the 17th century, is timber framed on a stone plinth, and has a tile roof and a stone wing on the left. On the front are two chimney stacks, one massive. There are two storeys and three gabled bays, the central bay smaller and recessed. In the centre is a gabled porch, and above is a gabled dormer. In the right bay is a bay window, and the storey above is jettied; the other windows are casements.	II
The Hall; 52.49293°N 2.74118°W	—	16th century	A farmhouse that was altered in the 17th century, it is partly timber framed with plaster infill, and partly in brick, and has a Welsh slate roof. There is one storey with an attic, two bays, the right bay gabled, and outshuts on the right side and at the rear. The porch is gabled with ornamental bargeboards, and the windows are casements.	II
Barn east of Bouldon Farmhouse; 52.46154°N 2.66894°W	—	16th or 17th century	The barn is partly timber framed with weatherboarding, partly in sandstone, and it has a tile roof. There are six bays, and various openings and entrances.	II
Peaton Hall; 52.46128°N 2.69159°W		16th or 17th century	The house was refronted in about 1920. It is in stone with a modillion eaves band, a tile roof, two storeys and a cellar, and three bays. There is a central gabled porch flanked by bay windows, the windows are mullioned and transomed, and there is a datestone. On the right side are gables and casement windows.	II
The Glebe Farmhouse; 52.46402°N 2.72630°W	—	16th or 17th century	The farmhouse was altered later. It has two storeys, a cellar and an attic, and an H-shaped plan, with a central range and cross-wings. The right cross-wing is timber framed with lath and plaster infill on a stone plinth, the central range and the left cross-wing are in stone, and the roof is tiled. The windows are 19th-century casements.	II
Westhope Hall; 52.47240°N 2.78395°W	—	1619	The house, which has been much altered, is in brick with stone quoins and a tile roof. There are two storeys and an attic, wings on both sides, and two gables on the front. In the centre is an entrance, and the windows are casements.	II
Bache Mill House; 52.46569°N 2.73217°W	—	Early 17th century	A timber framed house with brick infill and a tile roof. There are two storeys, two bays, and a stone outshut on the left. On the front is a gabled porch, and the windows are casements.	II
1 and 2 Lower Corfton; 52.45947°N 2.74121°W	—	17th century	A house, later divided into two dwellings, it is basically timber framed and was refronted in sandstone in the 19th century. It has a tile roof, one storey and attics, and a lean-to on the left. On the front are two gables, two gabled porches, and three casement windows. All the gables have ornamental bargeboards.	II
9 Lower Corfton; 52.46010°N 2.74063°W	—	17th century	A timber framed house with brick infill and a tile roof. It has one storey and attics, three bays, and a lean-to. In the centre is a gabled porch, the windows are casements, and in the attic are three gabled dormers.	II
Bouldon Farmhouse; 52.46162°N 2.66989°W	—	17th century	The farmhouse was altered in the 19th century. The original part is timber framed with brick infill, and consisted of a one-bay hall and an east cross-wing. The later parts are in sandstone and include a west cross-wing. The roof is tiled, there are two storeys and an attic, and an E-shaped plan. Some of the windows are casements, and others are cross-windows.	II
Brook Cottage; 52.46089°N 2.69311°W	—	17th century	The house is timber framed with plaster infill and has a tile roof. There is a single storey and attic, a T-shaped plan, and a front of two bays. The windows are casements.	II
Green Farm; 52.49196°N 2.74251°W	—	17th century	The farmhouse is timber framed with brick infill and has a tile roof. There is one storey and an attic, a stone lean-to on the left, a brick outshut on the right, and a roughcast rear wing. The doorway has a fanlight and a simple hood on brackets, the windows are casements, and there are two gabled dormers.	II
Manor Farm Barn; 52.49292°N 2.74079°W	—	17th century	The barn is timber framed with weatherboarding on a stone plinth and has a corrugated iron roof. There are three bays and various openings.	II
New House Farmhouse; 52.45646°N 2.67891°W	—	17th century	The farmhouse is partly timber framed with plaster infill on a stone plinth, and partly in stone, with a tile roof. It has a single storey and an attic, a front of five bays, and a rear wing. The doorway has a simple architrave, and the windows are casements. There is some weatherboarding on the rear wing.	II
North Sutton House; 52.44420°N 2.71331°W	—	17th century	The house has a timber framed core, and it was encased and extended in the late 18th or early 19th century. It has an H-shaped plan with a central range and cross-wings. There are two storeys, and an attic in the right cross-wing. The windows are casements, and there are two half-dormers in the central range. At the rear is a connecting range to a 17th-century outbuilding now integrated into the house as a kitchen range.	II
Upper Farmhouse; 52.49176°N 2.74292°W		17th century	The farmhouse is partly timber framed with brick infill on a stone plinth, partly in brick, partly roughcast, and partly stuccoed, and it has a tile roof. There are two storeys, an attic and cellars, and an L-shaped plan. The upper storey of the main wing is jettied with a chamfered bressumer, and the windows are casements.	II
Barn south of Upper Farmhouse; 52.49153°N 2.74293°W	—	17th century	The barn is timber framed with weatherboarding, and has a roof of tiles, corrugated iron and asbestos. There are five bays and various openings, including a wagon entrance.	II
Barn, Westhope Hall; 52.47168°N 2.78481°W	—	17th century (or earlier)	The barn is partly timber framed with weatherboarding, and partly in stone, and has a corrugated iron roof. There are eleven bays and various openings.	II
16 Upper Corfton; 52.46494°N 2.74984°W	—	Late 17th century	The house was restored in the 20th century. It is partly timber framed and partly in brick, and has a tile roof. There are two storeys and three bays. In the centre is a gabled porch, the windows are casements, and there are three gabled half-dormers.	II
Lydehole Farmhouse; 52.43406°N 2.70651°W	—	Late 17th century	The farmhouse is partly timber framed with plaster infill and partly in brick, and it has a Welsh slate roof. There is a single storey and an attic, and three bays, the right bay in brick. On the front is a gabled porch and French windows. Most of the windows are casements, on the right return is a sash window, and at the rear is a box-dormer.	II
Hill House Farm; 52.45742°N 2.74228°W	—	Late 17th or early 18th century	The farmhouse, which is in stone with a tile roof. was extended by the addition of a wing to the northwest in the 19th century. The original part has two storeys and a cellar and one bay, and the larger wing has three storeys and a cellar, three bays, and a modillion eaves band. The windows are casements, some with hood moulds.	II
Broncroft Lodge; 52.47236°N 2.69052°W	—	Mid 18th century	The farmhouse is in brick with modillion eaves and a tile roof. There are two storeys, three bays, and a rear wing. The central doorway has a fanlight, and a moulded open pediment hood on square piers. The windows in the main block are sashes with fluted keyblocks, and in the upper floor they are in gabled dormers. The rear wing contains casement windows.	II
Corfton House; 52.45864°N 2.74009°W	—	18th century	The house was extended in the 19th century. It is in brick with a storey band, a modillion eaves band, and a tile roof. There are two storeys, the main block has six bays, and there is a rear wing and later infilling. The central bay projects slightly and contains a doorway with a semicircular fanlight and a modillioned hood on attached Ionic columns. The windows are a mix of cross-windows containing casements, and sashes. At the rear is an arched carriageway.	II*
Coach house and stables, Delbury Hall; 52.46252°N 2.72367°W	—	18th century	The coach house and stables are in brick with a hipped tile roof. There are two storeys and a front of seven bays, the central bay projecting, and having a modillioned stone-coped pediment containing a clock face. Most windows are cross-windows, and there is a sash window. On the roof is an arcaded wooden bellcote with a moulded cornice, a lead pavilion roof, a ball finial, and an elaborate wrought iron weathervane.	II
Dovecote, Delbury Hall; 52.46220°N 2.72295°W	—	Mid 18th century	The dovecote is in sandstone with a brick modillion eaves band, and a tile roof with brick gable-parapets. It has a square plan, one storey, a doorway, and cross-windows. On the roof is a louvred lantern, and inside are nesting holes.	II
Garden walls, Peaton Hall; 52.46126°N 2.69114°W	—	18th century	The walls surround three sides of the garden to the east of the house. They are in brick on a chamfered stone plinth, with stone panels, and moulded brick coping. The walls are about 2.2 metres (7 ft 3 in) high.	II
Delbury Hall; 52.46274°N 2.72397°W		1753–56	A country house in Georgian style, it is in brick with a modillion eaves cornice, a parapet with stone coping, and a hipped double-pitch slate roof. There are three storeys and a cellar, and seven bays, the middle three bays projecting slightly, flanked by two-storey two-bay wings, also slightly projecting. The central doorway has a Gothick-glazed fanlight, and a moulded open-pediment hood on fluted pilasters. The windows are sashes.	II
Bridge south of Broncroft Lodge; 52.47164°N 2.69092°W	—	Mid to late 18th century	The bridge carries a track over a stream. It is in brick, and consists of a single arch with stone bands, coping, and springers. There are wing walls with pilasters, and brick retaining walls.	II
Bouldon Mill; 52.46118°N 2.66793°W	—	Late 18th or early 19th century	Originally a corn mill, later a private house, it is in sandstone and has a hipped tile roof. There are three storeys, an L-shaped plan, and a front of three bays. On the front is a central doorway, flanked by bow windows, and most of the other windows are casements. On the right return is an overshot waterwheel.	II
Church Cottage; 52.46375°N 2.72526°W	—	Late 18th or early 19th century	Originally the schoolmaster's house, it is in stone with a tile roof. There are two storeys, two bays, and to the left is a lean-to with weatherboarding over stone and a corrugated iron roof. In the centre of the front is a door with a simple porch, and the windows are casements.	II
Stable block, Sutton Court; 52.43736°N 2.71840°W	—	Late 18th or early 19th century	The stable block is in brick with a tile roof. There are two storeys, and it has an H-shaped plan. On the front are three gables with brick parapets, and in the centre is a carriage entrance flanked by doors. Many of the windows are under segmental arches. The left return is in sandstone and contains a casement window.	II
Barn northeast of Bouldon Farmhouse; 52.46180°N 2.66953°W	—	Early 19th century (probable)	The barn is in sandstone with alterations in brick and with a tile roof. It has six bays and an L-shaped plan. The barn contains various openings, and there are external steps to the granary.	II
Outbuildings, Delbury Hall; 52.46278°N 2.72549°W	—	Early 19th century	The outbuildings are in brick and sandstone, with brick modillion eaves and a tile roof. They have an L-shaped plan, and contain casement windows and various other openings.	II
Sutton Court; 52.43767°N 2.71825°W	—	Early 19th century	The house is in sandstone with a Welsh slate roof. It has an E-shaped plan with a main range and lateral and rear wings. There are three storeys, and the main range has three bays and a central doorway with a four-centred arched head. Most of the windows are sashes. In the right wing is a three-storey bay window, and in the left and rear wings are casement windows under brick segmental arches. The rear wing has a hipped tile roof, and contains a colonnade with Ionic columns, and French windows with a fanlight.	II
Wynetts Bank Cottage and outbuilding 52.46235°N 2.67042°W	—	Early 19th century	The house, which has an earlier core, is in sandstone with a Welsh slate roof. It has two storeys, two bays, and a rear lean-to. There is a central entrance, and the windows are casements, those in the upper floor in raking dormers. To the right is an attached outbuilding with a tile roof, a weatherboarded gable end, and a door.	II
Outbuildings, Broncroft Castle; 52.47681°N 2.67124°W	—	1832	The outbuildings are in sandstone with tile roofs, and are in an L-shaped plan. They have one and two storeys, windows and doorways under segmental arches, and ventilation slits.	II
The Parish Room; 52.46394°N 2.72549°W	—	19th century	Probably originally a school, and later used for other purposes, it is in stone with a tile roof. There is a single storey, a central doorway with a chamfered surround, and casement windows.	II
War Memorial; 52.46407°N 2.72534°W		c. 1920	The war memorial is in the churchyard of St Peter's Church. It is in limestone and consists of a wheel-head cross on a tapered shaft with chamfered edges on a square plinth on a two-stepped base. On the plinth are inscribed panels including the names of those lost in the First World War.	II
