= Heath Chapel =

Coordinates: 52.4667°N 2.6531°W

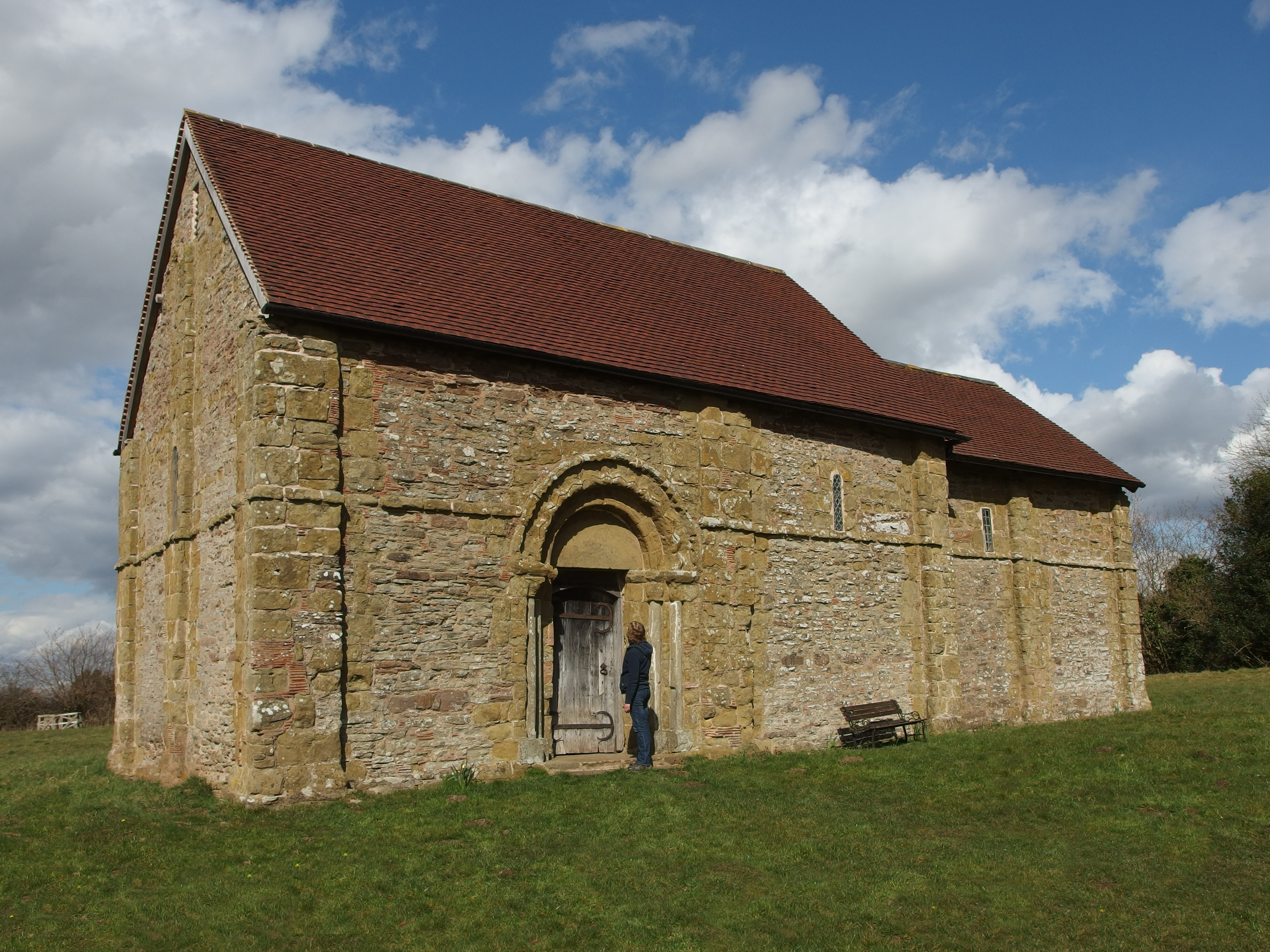
- Heath Chapel from the south

- Location in Shropshire
- OS grid reference: SO 557 856
- Location: Heath, Shropshire
- Country: England
- Denomination: Anglican
- Website: Heath Chapel

History
- Dedication: None

Architecture
- Heritage designation: Grade I
- Designated: 12 November 1954
- Architectural type: Chapel
- Style: Norman

Specifications
- Materials: Siltstone and sandstone

Administration
- Province: Canterbury
- Diocese: Hereford
- Archdeaconry: Ludlow
- Deanery: Ludlow
- Parish: Stoke St. Milborough with the Heath

Clergy
- Vicar: Ven C. H. Williams

Heath Chapel is located in an isolated position in a field in the former civil parish of Heath, Shropshire, England. It is an Anglican chapel in the deanery of Ludlow, the archdeaconry of Ludlow, and the diocese of Hereford. The chapel is served by the Ludlow Team Ministry. It is recorded in the National Heritage List for England as a designated Grade I listed building. The authors of the Buildings of England series describe it as "the perfect example of a rich little Norman chapel". The citation in the National Heritage List for England states that it "is nationally very remarkable as it has remained substantially unaltered in use, status, size and style".

== History ==
Heath Chapel was built in the middle of the 12th century. The roof of the nave was renewed in the 16th or 17th century. At about this time a flat plaster ceiling was added to the chancel, the walls were whitewashed, covering the medieval wall paintings, and texts were painted on the walls which were later also covered in whitewash. During the 17th century a communion rail was built on three sides of the altar, and pews were introduced in chancel and the nave. In 1870 the chapel was floored with flagstones. In 1912 the chancel ceiling was removed and a new roof built. At the same time some of the medieval wall paintings were exposed.

== Architecture ==
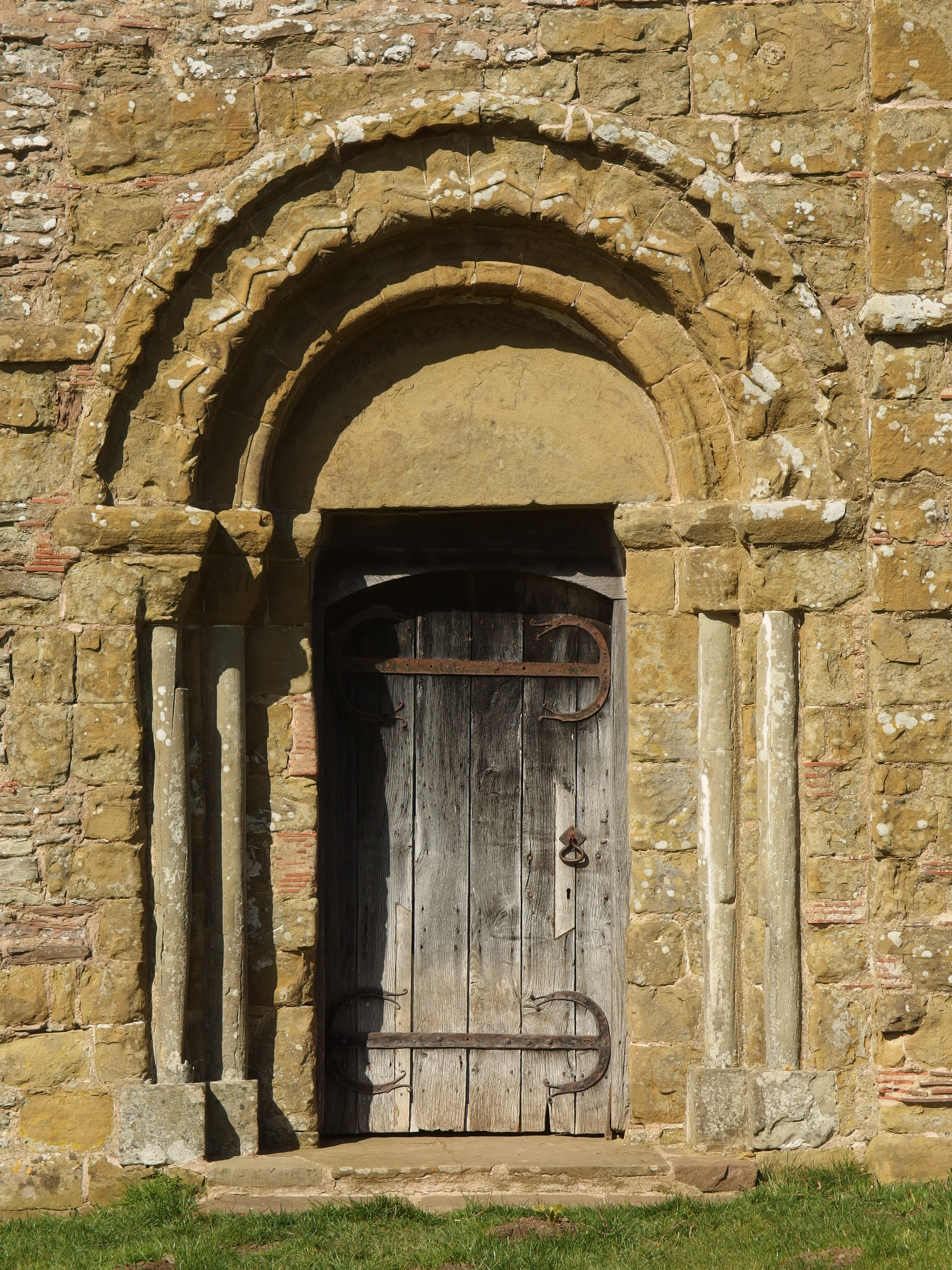
Heath Chapel doorway, Shropshire

The chapel is Norman in style. It is constructed in grey siltstone rubble with yellowish sandstone ashlar dressings. It has a rectangular plan, and consists of a two-bay nave with a south doorway and a two-bay chancel. There is no bellcote. The chapel is supported by full-height buttresses, and there is a string course around it at mid-height. The windows are small. The doorway has two orders of shafts with decayed capitals. It is decorated with chevrons, but has a plain tympanum.

Inside the chapel, the chancel arch has two orders of shafts and scalloped capitals. The tub-shaped font is Norman. There are five box pews and a two-decker pulpit, all dating from the 17th century. There is another pew in the chancel that has been constructed from reused medieval material. The communion rail is on three sides of the altar, and contains turned balusters. The identified subjects of the wall paintings include Saint George on the south wall, and the Last Judgement above the chancel arch. The 17th-century texts are present but faded.

== See also ==
- Grade I listed churches in Shropshire
- Listed buildings in Heath, Shropshire
