= Holdgate =

Village in Shropshire, England

Coordinates: 52.502°N 2.647°W

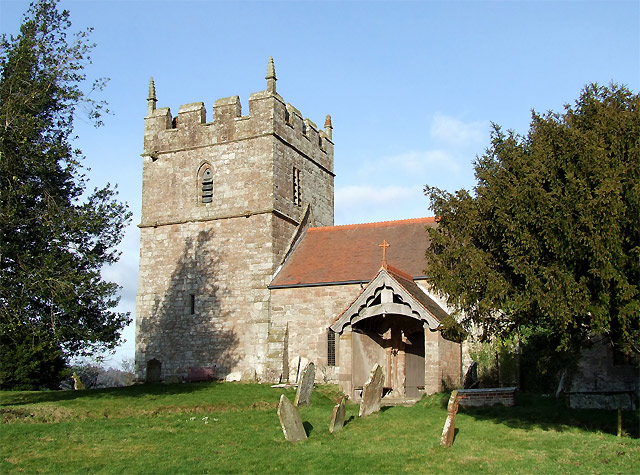
- Holy Trinity Church, Holdgate

- Location within Shropshire
- OS grid reference: SO560895
- Civil parish: Abdon and Heath
- Unitary authority: Shropshire
- Ceremonial county: Shropshire
- Region: West Midlands
- Country: England
- Sovereign state: United Kingdom
- Post town: MUCH WENLOCK
- Postcode district: TF13
- Dialling code: 01746
- Police: West Mercia
- Fire: Shropshire
- Ambulance: West Midlands
- UK Parliament: Ludlow

Holdgate (or Stanton Holdgate or Castle Holdgate) is a small village and former civil parish, now in the parish of Abdon and Heath, in the Shropshire district, in the ceremonial county of Shropshire, England. Its name is taken from its Norman lord Helgot who owned the village in 1086 along with 17 other parishes in Shropshire. In 1931 the parish had a population of 47.

The village is laid on top of a small hill which rises to 169 metres (554 ft) above sea level. Its parish church is Holy Trinity. There are remnants of the medieval Holdgate Castle. Holdgate was once (in medieval times) a more populous place than today.

On 1 April 1967 the parish was abolished and merged with Tugford and Munslow. Bouldon was, until 1884, a detached part of Holdgate parish.

A mile (1.6 km) to the northeast is the village of Stanton Long. Between the two villages, but within the former Holdgate parish (now in the Abdon and Heath parish) is the hamlet of Brookhampton.

To the south is Tugford.

== See also ==
- Holdgate Fee
- Deserted medieval village
- Listed buildings in Abdon, Shropshire
