= Holdgate Castle =

Castle in Shropshire, England

Holdgate Castle (sometimes spelt Holgate Castle) is situated in the village of Holdgate (or Stanton Holdgate or Castle Holdgate) between Craven Arms and Bridgnorth, Shropshire.

This castle was mentioned in the Domesday Book. It was a motte and bailey and contained a college of secular clergy which was founded before 1210 and dissolved after 1373. Earthworks with stone foundations are still present and the remains of a 13th-century semicircular flanking tower are incorporated into a farmhouse.
