= Diddlebury =

Village in Shropshire, England

Coordinates: 52.465°N 2.730°W

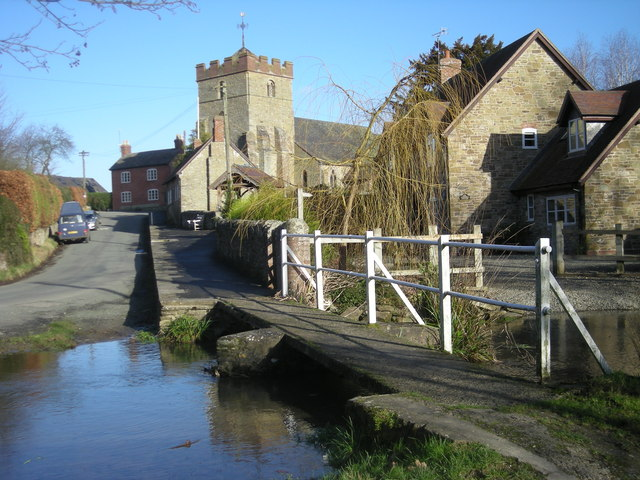
- Diddlebury church and footbridge over tributary of the River Corve

- Location within Shropshire
- Population: 670 (2011)
- OS grid reference: SO504855
- Civil parish: Diddlebury
- Unitary authority: Shropshire
- Ceremonial county: Shropshire
- Region: West Midlands
- Country: England
- Sovereign state: United Kingdom
- Post town: CRAVEN ARMS
- Postcode district: SY7
- Dialling code: 01584
- Police: West Mercia
- Fire: Shropshire
- Ambulance: West Midlands
- UK Parliament: Ludlow

Diddlebury is a small village and large civil parish in Shropshire, England. It is situated in the Corvedale on the B4368 road about 5 miles (8 km) north east of Craven Arms. As of 2011, the population of the Civil Ward was 670.

== Public buildings ==
St Peter's parish church has an unusual but distinctive herringbone internal stonework facing to the north wall of the nave. This feature dates back to the Anglo-Saxon times.

There is a primary school in the village. The school takes in pupils from surrounding villages too, called Corvedale CofE. It currently has around 85 pupils.

The village also has a village hall, built in 1951, near the church and the school. It is mainly used for clubs and local events. The village hall has since been renovated, with the working being completed around 2019.

== Civil parish ==
The civil parish of Diddlebury is large, encompassing land on both sides of the River Corve. Between the River Corve and the Pye Brook, to the east of Diddlebury, lie the ringwork and other remaining earthworks of Corfham Castle. The hamlets of Bouldon and Peaton lie in the east of the parish, along the course of the Pye Brook. The Corvedale Three Castles Walk runs through the parish.

=== Electoral division ===
The parish forms part of the electoral division (for electing members to Shropshire Council) of Corvedale.

== See also ==
- Listed buildings in Diddlebury
