= Castle Three =

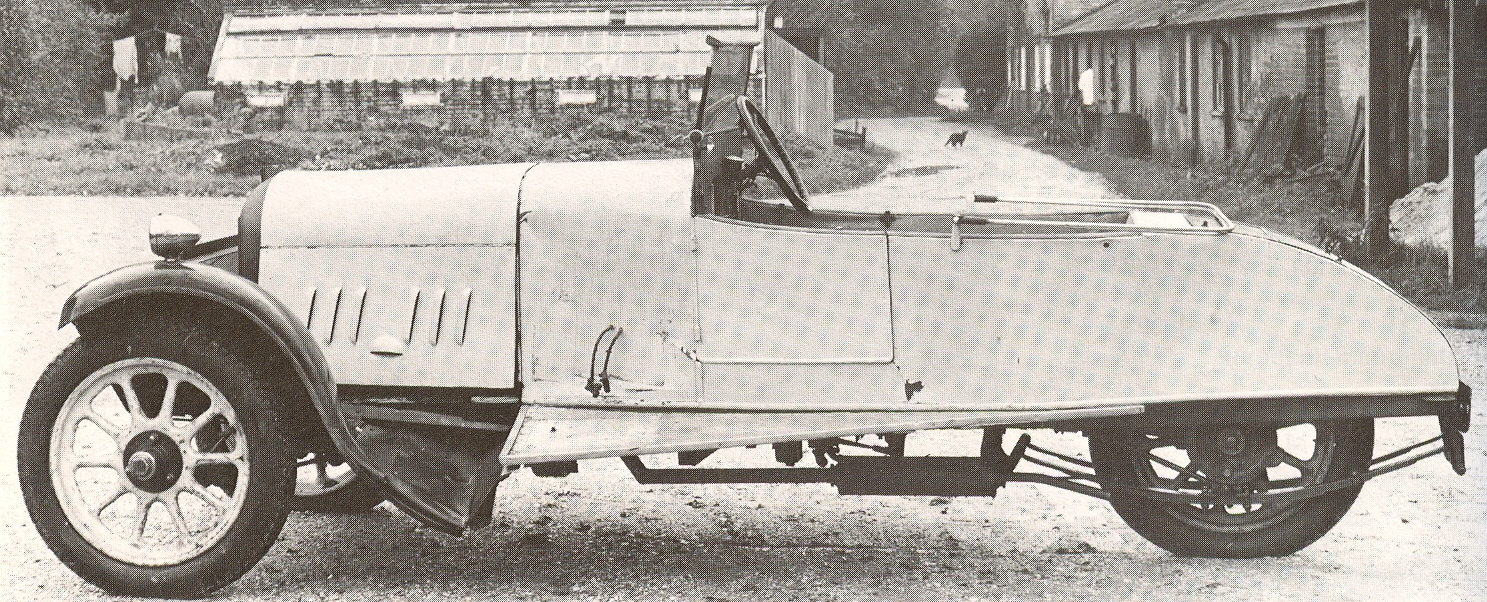

Overview
- Manufacturer: Castle Motor Company
- Production: 1919-1922

Body and chassis
- Class: cyclecar

Powertrain
- Engine: 1094 cc Dorman or 1207 cc Peters in-line 4-cylinder
- Transmission: two- or three-speed

Chronology
- Successor: In development

The Castle Three was a British three-wheeled cyclecar made from 1919 to 1922 by the Castle Motor Company of Castle Mill Works, New Road, Kidderminster, Worcestershire.

== History ==
The company was originally a car repair business founded in 1906 by brothers Stanley and Laughton Goodwin but grew to make munitions during World War I and entered the car building business with the coming of peace and the post-war boom.

== The cars ==
The car was aimed at the top end of the Cyclecar market and so was fitted with a four-cylinder, water-cooled engine. The first batch of cars had side-valve, straight four, Dorman engines of 1094 cc with the remainder using Belgian Peters 1207 cc engines. These were in-unit with a gearbox, either of two-speed epicyclic or three-speed conventional type and drove the single rear wheel by a shaft and bevel gears.

The open two-seater body with dickey seat had a smart nickel-plated radiator and electric lighting and was attached on a chassis with the suspension using quarter elliptic leaf springs at the front and semi elliptic at the rear. Unusually for a cyclecar, artillery wheels were used rather than wire-spoked ones.

The car was exhibited at the 1919 London Motor Show and a reputed 2,300 orders were taken. Not all these were confirmed and it is estimated that around 350 were made. Two are known to survive.

A prototype of a four-wheel version was made but never went into production. The company closed in 1922, selling the works to a carpet maker.

== Successor ==
Castle Three Motor

Overview
- Manufacturer: Castle Three Motor Company

Body and chassis
- Class: Three-wheeler
- Body style: roadster
- Layout: FR

Chronology
- Predecessor: Castle Three

In August 2013 the Castle Three Motor Company Limited was incorporated in Alnwick, Northumberland with plans to develop, manufacture and sell new generation three-wheeled sports cars for the recreational and motor sport markets.

While the original had 2+1 seating and a four-cylinder engine, the new three-wheeler will have two seats and use an externally sourced twin-pot — either in V or boxer form — to power the rear wheel via a largely proprietary drivetrain.

== See also ==
- List of car manufacturers of the United Kingdom
