= Heath, Shropshire =

Hamlet in Shropshire, England

Coordinates: 52.466°N 2.650°W

Heath
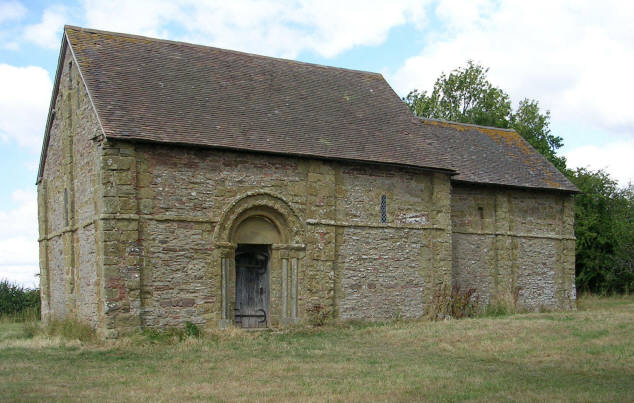
- Heath Chapel

- Location within Shropshire
- OS grid reference: SO558855
- Civil parish: Abdon and Heath
- Unitary authority: Shropshire
- Ceremonial county: Shropshire
- Region: West Midlands
- Country: England
- Sovereign state: United Kingdom
- Post town: CRAVEN ARMS
- Postcode district: SY7
- Dialling code: 01584
- Police: West Mercia
- Fire: Shropshire
- Ambulance: West Midlands
- UK Parliament: Ludlow

Heath is a hamlet and former civil parish, now in the parish of Abdon and Heath, in the Clee Hills area of Shropshire, England.

The settlement and wider rural area historically had a larger population than now, especially in medieval times. Heath Chapel is a Norman Grade I Listed building. Heath was formerly a township in the parish of Stoke-St. Milborough, in 1866 Heath became a separate civil parish, on 1 April 2017 the parish was abolished and merged with Abdon to form "Abdon and Heath". In 1971 the parish had a population of 26. From 1974 to 2009 it was in South Shropshire district.

Nearby are the larger settlements of Bouldon and Clee St. Margaret. Heath lies at approximately 240 metres (790 ft) above sea level.

== See also ==
- Listed buildings in Heath, Shropshire
- Deserted medieval village
