= Henry Bembridge =

English cricketer

Henry Bembridge (1849–1920) was an English miner from Nottinghamshire and cricket professional.

== Life ==
Born in Bulwell, Bembridge belonged to the Bulwell cricket club, and was regarded as "proficient with both bat and ball". A report for a club match between Bulwell and Nuthall in August 1877 said "The bowling of Bembridge and Tye for Bulwell was splendid, the former taking four wickets in five balls."

While Bembridge's birth date is given as 1852 in the Who's Who of Cricketers, the Trent Bridge website gives it as 1849, and this date can be identified with a Henry Bainbridge, birth registered in Basford, Nottinghamshire. He died in 1920 in Bolton. The death record registered at Bolton in 1920 for Henry Bembridge gives his age as 71, consistent with the earlier date.

Bembridge was a right-handed batsman and a right-arm fast bowler who played for Nottinghamshire. He had a Colts trial in 1876. He had another trial in 1878. He made a single first-class appearance, in a County Match against Yorkshire in 1878. Batting at number eleven, Bembridge scored 15 runs in the first innings, and two runs in the second.

By the early 1880s, Bembridge had moved to Wigan as a cricket professional. He was later professional to Bolton Cricket Club. He had in 1878 appeared for the Bolton XVIII in a match with the United South of England XI, for whom W. G. Grace played.
