= Corvedale Three Castles Walk =

Recreational walk in Shropshire, England

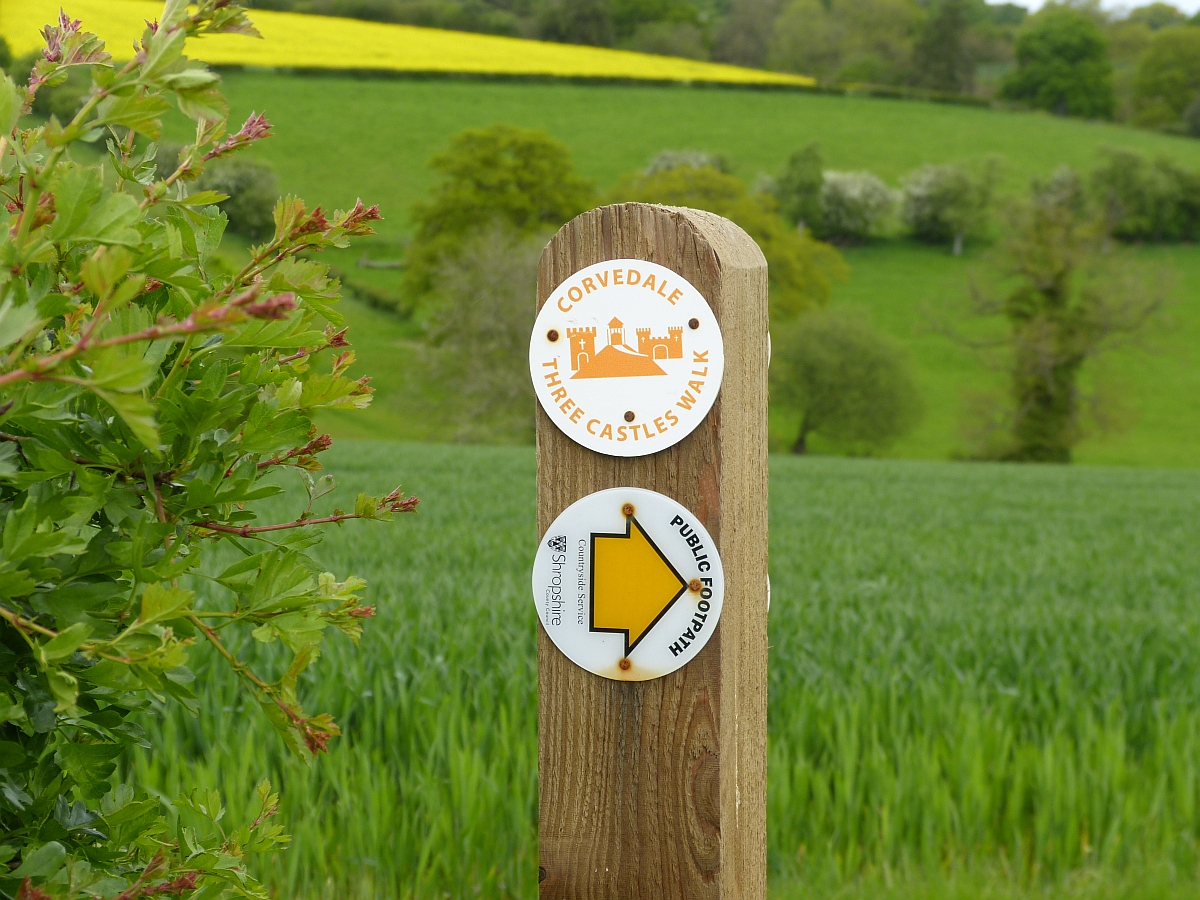
A Way Marker on the Corvedale Three Castles Walk

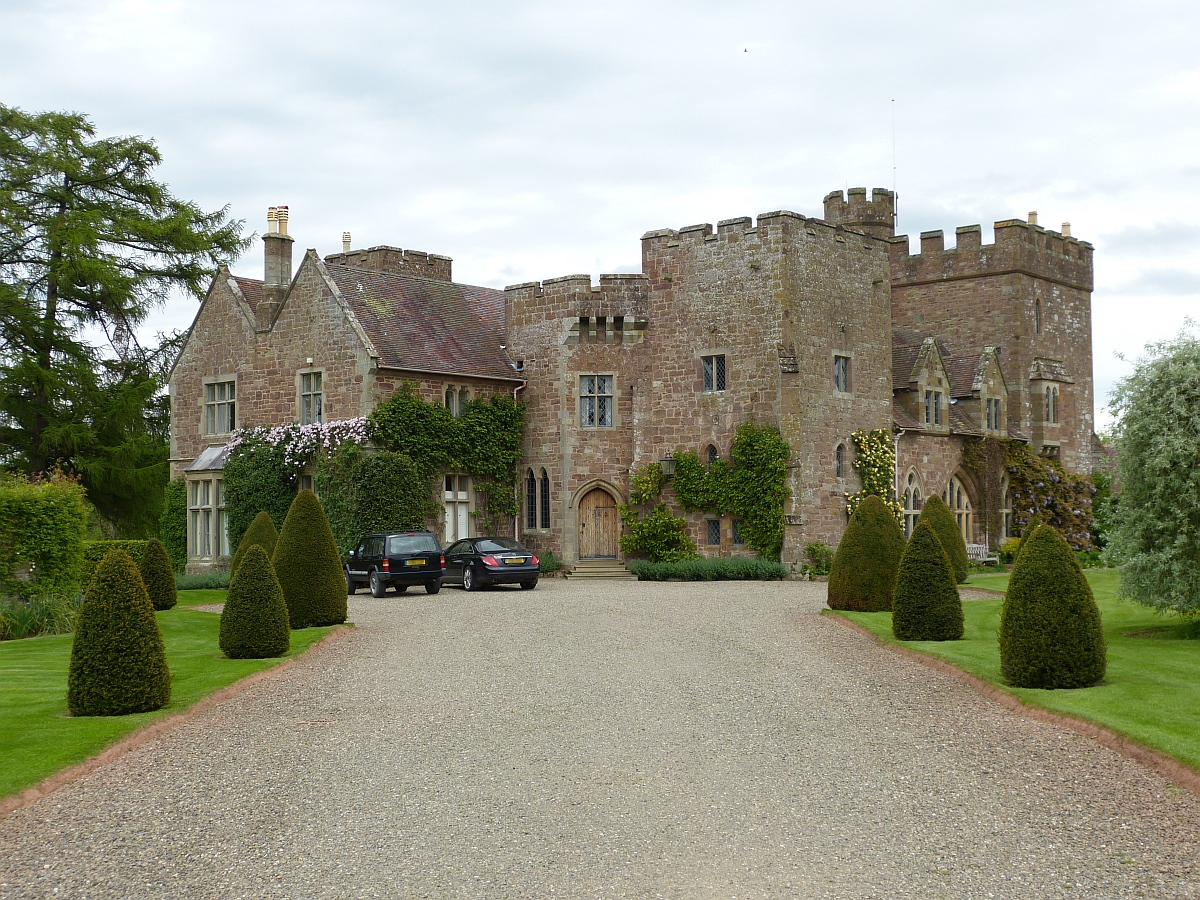
View of Broncroft Castle from the road on the Corvedale Three Castles Walk

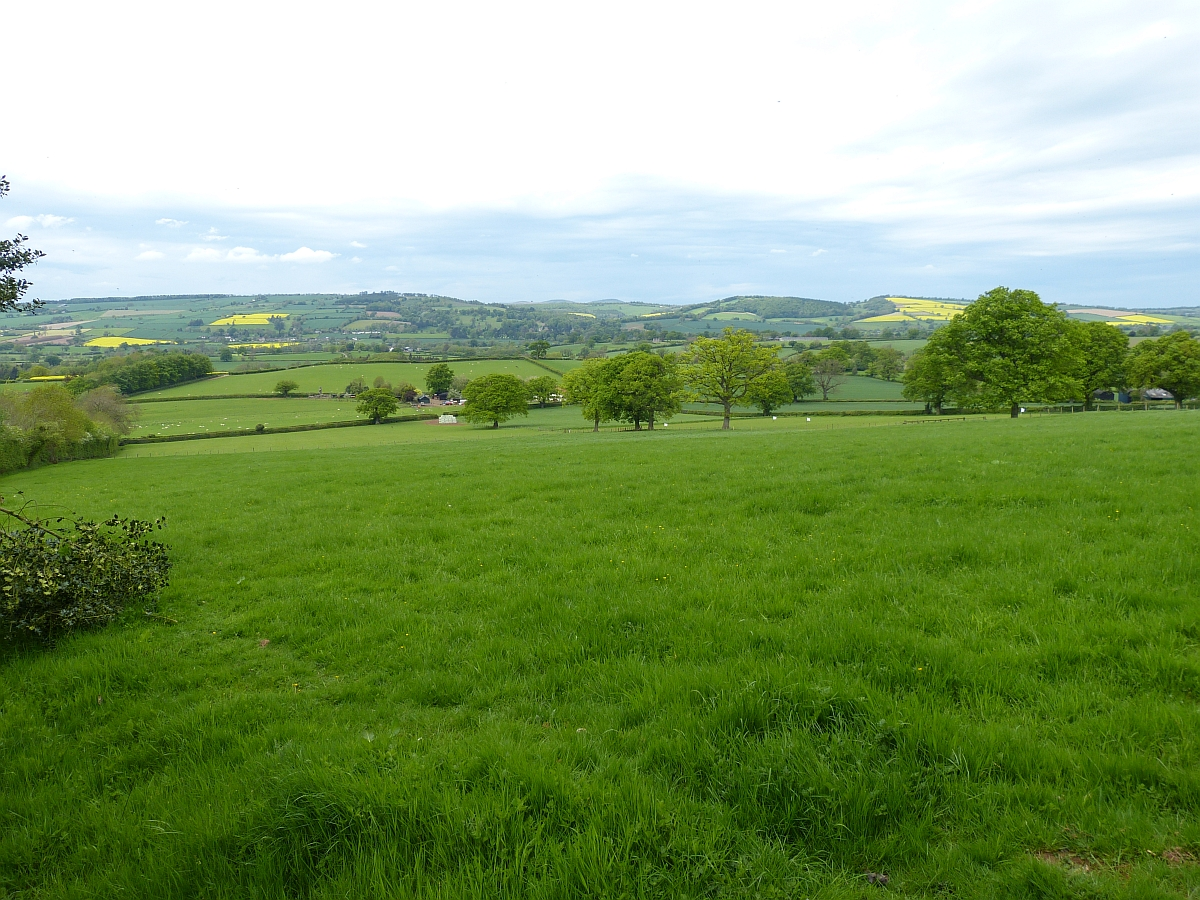
View of the Corvedale from Wynett Coppice

The Corvedale Three Castles Walk is a waymarked recreational circular walk of about 11.5 miles (18.5 km) located in the Corvedale, Shropshire, England. The walk is classed as Easy and Heritage by the Long Distance Walkers Association. The walk nominally starts (and ends) at the public car park opposite the Swan Inn in Aston Munslow, but other starting points are possible although parking is limited. The walk goes past Broncroft Castle (52.476422°N 2.672107°W), Corfham Castle (earthworks) (52.460758°N 2.700383°W), and Corfton Castle (earthworks) (52.458237°N 2.740205°W). A leaflet is available detailing the walk and can be obtained from some local pubs and retailers. Some bed and breakfasts also have it available. In addition there is a book Castle and Corvedale available from the same sources.

== Hostelries on the route ==
There are two pubs, both of which serve food, on the route:

- The Swan Inn at the start of the walk (and, of course, the end if the complete circuit is done)
- The Tally Ho Inn about 40% round the route (in a clockwise direction)

== Wildlife ==
The Corvedale has many hedgerows as well as wooded areas and coppices, so walkers can see much wildlife if they are observant. The signature species for the Corvedale is the Common Buzzard (the local bus is called The Buzzard). However Red Kites are also becoming quite common.

== See also ==
Munslow
River Corve
