= River Corve =

River in Shropshire, England

Coordinates: 52.426°N 2.744°W

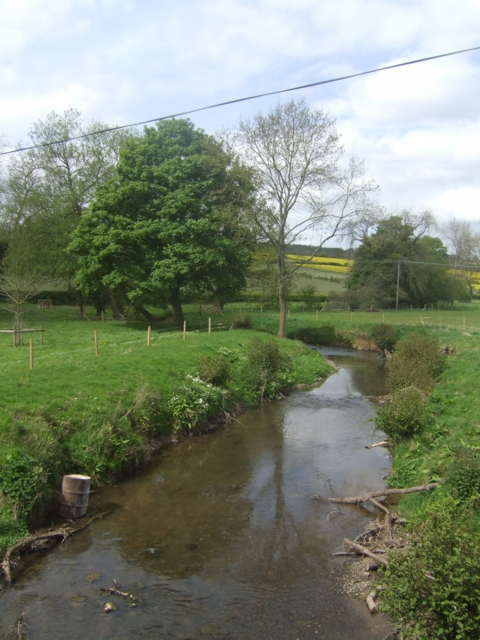
- River Corve - upstream at Beambridge

Location
- Country: England
- Counties: Shropshire
- City: Ludlow

Physical characteristics
- Mouth: Confluence with River Teme
  - location: Ludlow, Shropshire, England
  - elevation: 75 m (246 ft)

Basin features
- Tributaries
  - left: Trow Brook, Pye Brook, Hope Gutter, Fishmore Brook
  - right: Seifton Brook, Langley Gutter

The River Corve is a minor river in Shropshire, England. It is a tributary of the River Teme which it joins in the town of Ludlow, and which joins the River Severn at Powick near Worcester. The valley it flows through is known as the Corvedale (or Corve Dale), a term used as a general name for the area, and a name used for example by the primary school in Diddlebury. It is sometimes (archaically) spelled "Corf", which is its pronunciation.

== Course ==
It flows near Corfton (which it gives its name to), then by Culmington, then through Stanton Lacy and then through the northwest outskirts of Ludlow before joining the Teme in an area of meadows just outside the town. It also gave its name to Corfham Castle, near Peaton. Corfham was the caput (the centre of medieval administration) for two Saxon hundreds that encompassed the Corve Dale — Patton and Culvestan. They were merged into a single hundred (Munslow) in the reign of Henry I, however Culvestan continued to be a name used to describe the lower Corve valley for at least a century afterwards.

== Pollution and floods ==
In 2006 as a result of pollution by slurry from a livestock farm in Brockton near Stanton Long, fish were found dead in the river.

During heavy flooding in 2007 when the river rose 1.6 metres (5 ft 3 in) in three hours, a house collapsed into the river and the Burway Bridge collapsed severing the connection of the B4361 Coronation Avenue, a major access route, with the town centre of Ludlow. A new, modern bridge designed by the Shrewsbury office of the consultants Mouchel on behalf of Shropshire County Council, and built by McPhillips (Wellington) Ltd, was completed in 2008. A temporary Bailey bridge had been erected to reduce disruption in traffic flow during the construction.

== Electoral wards ==
'Corvedale' is an electoral division for electing one member to Shropshire Council. The population of this ward at the 2011 Census was 3,783. It covers a large rural area, consisting of 13 civil parishes, and encompassing more than that of the familiar Corvedale area.

'Corve' is a parish ward for electing two members to Ludlow Town Council, covering the northwest part of the town.

== See also ==
- Corvedale Three Castles Walk
